= First Nations in Ontario =

First Nations in Ontario constitute many nations. Common First Nations ethnicities in the province include the Anishinaabe, Haudenosaunee, and the Cree. In southern portions of this province, there are reserves of the Mohawk, Cayuga, Onondaga, Oneida, Seneca and Tuscarora.

- Aamjiwnaang First Nation
- Alderville First Nation
- Algonquins of Pikwàkanagàn First Nation
- Attawapiskat First Nation
- Aundeck Omni Kaning First Nation
- Batchewana First Nation
- Bearfoot Onondaga First Nation
- Beausoleil First Nation
- Beaverhouse First Nation (non-Status)
- Brunswick House First Nation
- Caldwell First Nation
- Chapleau Cree First Nation
- Chippewas of the Thames First Nation
- Chippewas of Georgina Island First Nation
- Chippewas of Kettle & Stony Point
- Chippewas of Mnjikaning First Nation (Rama)
- Chippewas of Nawash
- Constance Lake First Nation
- Curve Lake First Nation
- Delaware Nation at Moraviantown
- Dokis First Nation
- Flying Post First Nation
- Fort Severn First Nation
- Fort Albany First Nation
- Ojibways of Garden River
- Hiawatha First Nation
- Iskutewizaagegan
- Kingfisher First Nation
- Koocheching First Nation
- Magnetawan First Nation
- Matachewan First Nation
- Mattagami First Nation
- M'Chigeeng First Nation
- Michipicoten First Nation
- Missanabie Cree First Nation
- Mississauga First Nation
- Mississaugas of the Credit
- Mississaugas of Scugog Island
- Mocreebec Indian Government
- Mohawks of Akwesasne
- Mohawks of the Bay of Quinte
- Moose Cree First Nation
- Moose Deer Point First Nation
- Munsee-Delaware Nation
- Namaygoosisagagun First Nation (non-Status)
- Naotkamegwanning Anishinabe First Nation
- Netmizaaggamig Nishnaabeg (Pic Mobert)
- Nipissing First Nation
- Oneida Nation of the Thames
- Poplar Point First Nation
- Sagamok Anishnawbek First Nation
- Saugeen First Nation
- Saugeen Ojibway Nation Territory
- Serpent River First Nation
- Shawanaga First Nation
- Sheguiandah First Nation
- Sheshegwaning First Nation
- Six Nations of the Grand River
- Taykwa Tagamou
- Temagami First Nation
- Thessalon First Nation
- Wahgoshig First Nation
- Wahnapitae First Nation
- Wahta Mohawks
- Wasauksing First Nation
- Washagamis Bay First Nation
- Whitewater Lake First Nation
- Walpole Island First Nation
- Wikwemikong Unceded First Nation
- Zhiibaahaasing First Nation

== First Nations in Northwestern Ontario ==
- Animbiigoo Zaagi'igan Anishinaabek First Nation
- Anishinaabeg of Naongashiing
- Aroland First Nation
- Atikameksheng Anishnawbek First Nation
- Attawapiskat First Nation
- Bearskin Lake First Nation
- Big Grassy First Nation
- Biigtigong Nishnaabeg
- Biinjitiwaabik Zaaging Anishinaabek First Nation
- Bingwi Neyaashi Anishinaabek
- Cat Lake First Nation
- Couchiching First Nation
- Deer Lake First Nation
- Eabametoong First Nation
- Eagle Lake First Nation
- Fort Severn First Nation
- Fort William First Nation
- Ginoogaming First Nation
- Grassy Narrows First Nation
- Gull Bay First Nation
- Hornepayne First Nation
- Kasabonika Lake First Nation
- Kashechewan First Nation
- Keewaywin First Nation
- Kitchenuhmaykoosib Inninuwug First Nation
- Lac des Mille Lacs First Nation
- Lac La Croix First Nation
- Lac Seul First Nation
- Long Lake First Nation
- Marten Falls First Nation
- McDowell Lake First Nation
- Mishkeegogamang First Nation
- Mitaanjigamiing First Nation
- Muskrat Dam Lake First Nation
- Naicatchewenin First Nation
- Neskantaga First Nation
- Nibinamik First Nation
- Nigigoonsiminikaaning First Nation
- Niisaachewan Anishinaabe Nation
- North Caribou Lake First Nation
- North Spirit Lake First Nation
- Northwest Angle No. 33 First Nation
- Northwest Angle No. 37 First Nation
- Ojibways of Onigaming
- Pays Plat First Nation
- Pikangikum First Nation
- Poplar Hill First Nation
- Rainy River First Nation
- Red Rock Band
- Sachigo Lake First Nation
- Sandy Lake First Nation
- Seine River First Nation
- Shoal Lake First Nation
- Slate Falls First Nation
- Wabaseemoong Independent Nation
- Wasauksing First Nation
- Wabigoon First Nation
- Wapekeka First Nation
- Wauzhushk Onigum First Nation
- Wawakapewin First Nation
- Webequie First Nation
- Weenusk First Nation
- Whitesand First Nation
- Wunnumin Lake First Nation

== Demographics ==
=== Knowledge of language ===
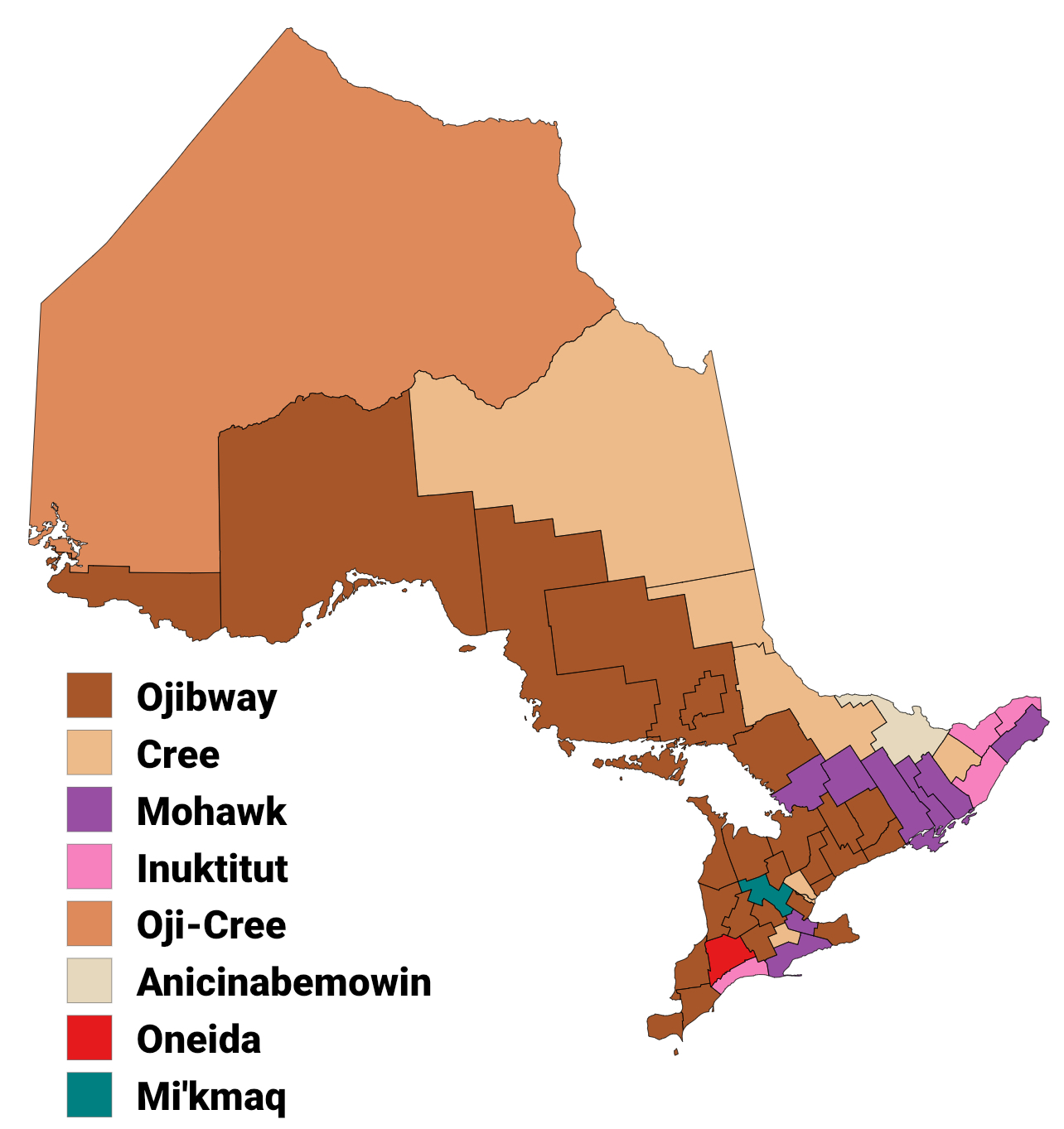
Largest Indigenous knowledge of language in Ontario, 2021 census
