= Ring of Fire (Northern Ontario) =

Mineral-rich region in Canada

Coordinates: 52°46′0″N 86°3′0″W

The Ring of Fire is a mineral-rich crescent-shaped geographical region in the James Bay Lowlands of Northern Ontario, Canada. It is approximately 5,000 square kilometres in size with most discoveries of chromite, nickel, copper, platinum group elements, gold, zinc, and palladium found in a 20 kilometre strip of land.

Potential development of mining sites, particularly "Eagle's Nest" (copper-nickel) and "Black Thor" (chromite), have been controversial in both Federal and Provincial politics since the Ring of Fire was discovered in 2007. Australian-based company Wyloo Metals is the current owner of "Eagle's Nest" and plans to construct a mine on the site in 2027, with production planned to begin in 2030. It is believed to contain more than 15.7 million tonnes of high-grade nickel with "significant" amounts of copper and platinum group metals. Ontario-based exploration company Juno Corp. is the largest private claimholder of the Ring of Fire. As of January 2025, Juno Corp. has laid claim to 4,600 square kilometres of land, including an area known as the Vespa Complex. Juno formed in 2019 with the goal of "systematically making discoveries" in the Ring of Fire and is responsible for expanding mining developments past the original "Ring" into outlying areas.

The crescent-shaped Ring of Fire is named after a song popularized by Johnny Cash.

Location of the Ring of Fire and Nearby First Nations Communities

== Geography ==
The James Bay Lowlands is a region of the greater Hudson Bay Lowlands, which together form the second-largest undisturbed peatland in the world. Because of the natural high saturation of these wetlands, it is particularly sensitive to environmental pollutants such as toxic tailings and waste rock. The portion of peatland that covers the Ring of Fire is estimated to contain 1.6 billion tonnes of carbon.

The Ring of Fire itself is located in Ontario's Far North region which contains the world's largest area of boreal forest free from large-scale human disturbance. A portion of the site crosses the Attawapiskat River, which has a drainage area of 50, 200 kilometers, and flows into James Bay through Attawapiskat First Nation.

The closest permanent settlements in the region are the nine communities that compose the Matawa First Nations and are represented by the Matawa First Nations Management (MFNM) Tribal Council. The Council was established in 1988 and serves a combined population of over 10,000 people. The Ring of Fire is located on territory covered by Treaty 9, also known as The James Bay Treaty. For many First Nations living in the area, the traditional name for the Ring of Fire is Kawana 'bi 'kag.

In June 2025, citizens of Neskantaga and Attawapiskat First Nations began a permanent settlement on the shore of the Attawapiskat River approximately 70 kilometers north of Neskantaga. The intention of the new village is threefold: to act as a base for those proving First Nations residence of the area since at least the 1870s, to provide an opportunity to return "back to the old ways," and to be ready to block the bridge and road into the Ring of Fire on the Northern Road Link when construction is projected to reach the site in 2040. According to local journalist Jon Thompson, "the most powerful" archaeological evidence is implied by the imposing eight-foot cross that looms over the river, two kilometres from the proposed bridge. As of September 2025, it is not confirmed whether the person whose remains are buried beneath the cross belonged to Neskantaga First Nations or to Marten Falls First Nations.

== First Nations and the Ring of Fire ==
There are numerous Treaty 9 First Nations communities surrounding the proposed mines including First Nations in both Matawa and Mushkegowuk Council territories. The Mushkegowuk Council (based in Moose Factory, Ontario) represents eight Cree First Nations and the Matawa Council (based in Thunder Bay, Ontario) represents nine First Nations communities whose populations are composed of Ojibwe, Cree, and Oji-Cree peoples. Among the eight Matawa First Nations, four have long term drinking water advisories - Eabametoong First Nation (issued August 8, 2001), Marten Falls First Nation (issued July 18, 2005), Neskantaga First Nation (issued February 1, 1995), and Nibinamak First Nation (issued February 5, 2013). Neskantaga First Nation's boil water advisory is the longest in Canadian history.

In June 2025, the Government of Ontario and the Government of Canada passed legislation that allowed both provincial and federal leadership to override environmental protections and Indigenous rights in favour of economic development. As a result, previous commitments to First Nations regarding the Ring of Fire may not be honoured. While Premier Doug Ford had previously stated that the Ring of Fire would be the first "special economic zone" declared under Bill 5, as of September 2025 this has not been announced.

On July 14, 2025, the Mushkegowuk Council of Chiefs passed a resolution designating the Ring of Fire as "protected homeland on which development, and any projects or activities in support of development, cannot be undertaken without first acquiring the free, prior and informed consent."

=== Past Agreements ===
In 2012, Ontario's Minister of Northern Development and Mines struck a deal with Cliffs Natural Resources, an American steel company (now known as Cleveland-Cliffs) that had acquired significant chromite deposits in the Ring of Fire, including Black Thor, Black Label, and a portion of Big Daddy and had ambitious plans for rapid development of these deposits. A 2012 CBC article said that the proposed Cliffs mine would be located at the headwaters of the Attawapiskat River, across from Neskantaga First Nation. As of 2012, the three First Nations most profoundly impacted by Noront Resources' Eagle's Nest Project and Cliffs Natural Resources were Marten Falls First Nation, Webequie First Nation and Neskantaga First Nation. Others on the edge of the Ring of Fire include Constance Lake First Nation (Chief Roger Wesley), Nibinamik First Nation, Aroland First Nation, Long Lake 58 First Nation, Ginoogaming First Nation, Eabametoong First Nation, Mishkeegogamang First Nation, and Constance Lake First Nation. They are represented by the Nishnawbe Aski Nation (NAN). NAN is a political territorial organization that represents the 50 First Nations that are part of the Treaty No. 9 area in Northern Ontario. At the provincial level, the community, tribal council and political territorial organization participate in a province-wide coordinating body, the Chiefs of Ontario. The Assembly of First Nations represents the community along with other First Nations organizations and councils as well as over 600 First Nations across Canada. Attawapiskat First Nation, Kashechewan First Nation and Fort Albany First Nation are on the outer ring. Discovery of diamonds by Victor Mine on Attawapiskat First Nation traditional land, was one of the catalysts to further exploration resulting in the discovery of chromite.

In May 2011, Matawa Chiefs and their communities called for a Joint Environmental Assessment (EA) Review Panel. (Note: First Nations have a constitutional right to be consulted and accommodated by provincial and the federal governments. The federal government has a focus on streamlining review processes through 2012 changes to the Canadian Environmental Assessment Act to avoid a repeat of the lengthy Northern Gateway Pipeline Project Joint Review Panel which had a broad mandate under both the National Energy Board Act and the Canadian Environmental Assessment Act to "consider whether the Northern Gateway Pipeline Project is likely to cause significant adverse environmental effects and if it is in the public interest". The review process included multiple opportunities for the public and Aboriginal groups to provide input NEB.) On October 13, 2011, the Canadian Environmental Assessment Agency (CEAA) proceeded with a Comprehensive Study Environmental Assessment that favoured the mining industry without First Nations participation. On October 20, 2011, Matawa First Nations removed its support for the Ring of Fire development unless the federal government agreed to a joint review panel Environmental Assessment process that would allow First Nations communities in the area to have a voice in the assessment.

On June 12, 2012, Webequie First Nation Chief Cornelius Wabasse and Minister of Northern Development and Mines Rick Bartolucci signed an agreement that "commits Ontario to providing social, community and economic development supports for Webequie to help facilitate the community's involvement in the Ring of Fire". They would "work together on regional environmental monitoring and regional infrastructure planning".

On January 20, 2025, fifteen First Nation partners—Aroland First Nation, Attawapiskat First Nation, Constance Lake First Nation, Eabametoong First Nation, Fort Albany First Nation, Ginoogaming First Nation, Kashechewan First Nation, Long Lake 58 First Nation, Marten Falls First Nation, Missanabie Cree First Nation, Moose Cree First Nation, Neskantaga First Nation, Nibinamik First Nation, Webequie First Nation, and Weenusk First Nation—and the Impact Assessment Agency of Canada (IAAC) reached a 'Milestone' deal regarding mining in the Ring of Fire area. While the deal did not finalize mining projects, it did establish terms for conducting assessments on First Nations territory.

== History of Development ==
=== 2003 - 2006 ===
In 2003, Noront Resources began using two frozen lakes—Koper Lake, located about 128 kilometres (80 miles) north of Marten Falls, and McFaulds Lake—as landing strips without consulting Martens Falls and Webequie First Nations. The Mining Act (Note: In 2009 the Government of Ontario introduced an Act to Amend the Mining Act to update the 1873 Ontario Mining Act, under the jurisdiction of the Ministry of Northern Development, Mines and Forestry (MNDM&F). Mining interests are allowed access to most of the land in Ontario, including private property and "mining projects are exempt from full environmental assessments and are under no obligation to clean up a mining site after the mine has closed". The 2009 amendments "failed to address the exemption permitted for mining from the environmental assessment process or protect Ontarians from being on the hook to pay for cleanup costs".Ontario Nature) only allows exploration activities, not the construction of permanent structures. In a 2010 interview with Wawatay News, Marten Falls First Nations Chief Eli Moonias explained that Noront Resources had not gained permits to construct landing strips on the string bog or roads to the nearby airstrip and refused to build and maintain the infrastructure needed to prevent further damages to the wetlands environment. Moonias described that between 2003 to 2010, Noront Resources had "done outrageous acts" including sinking machines in the wetlands and using a helicopter to break ice with a log. He expressed environmental concerns over "sewage, grey-water, oil spills and road clearing" that had occurred during this seven-year period.

In September 2003, Freewest Resources Canada, began exploring "Black Thor" using airborne geophysics and ground geophysics.

=== 2007 - 2009 ===
On 28 August 2007, Noront Resources announced the discovery of a "large find" of "high grade deposit" of platinum, palladium, nickel, and copper 500 kilometres (310 miles) northeast of Thunder Bay, Ontario. Its underground mine project is named the Eagle's Nest Project. (Note: According to Gregory Reynolds' 28 July 2008 post on the Republic of Mining, Noront Resources Ltd had drilled two holes in the ground, with one having copper sulfide mineralization and the other hole with similar results. A few months later, Noront announced that it had found nickel, copper, platinum, and palladium a few meters below the surface.) To reduce heavy truck traffic, Noront shared plans to build a buried 90 kilometres (56 miles)-long slurry pipeline, using new technology safety features, from the site to Webequie Junction.

In February 2008, Freewest Resources Canada presented findings of a chromite prospect at "Black Thor" with an estimated 2 kilometres (1.2 miles) strike length, a depth of 200 metres (660 ft), and a 40 metres (130 ft) width containing an estimated 72 megatonnes of chromite ore (42% Cr_{2}O_{3}). In September 2009, American steel manufacturer Cliffs Natural Resources (now Cleveland-Cliffs) announced an "ambitious timetable for developing the Black Thor chromite deposit", hoping to complete permits and environmental assessment approvals by the end of 2013 (MRI)in September 2009. In October 2009, Noront Resources (NOT-V) made a hostile takeover bid for Freewest Resources (FWR-V). In November 2009, Cliffs Natural Resources (CLF-N), the world's largest iron ore pellet supplier, purchased Freewest Resources' share of the chromite-rich deposits of Black Thor, Black Label, and Big Daddy for $240 million. In November 2009, Joseph Carrabba, Cliffs' president and CEO, claimed the "world-class deposits" had the "potential to support an open pit mine producing 1 to 2 million tonnes per year for more than thirty years". Carrabba announced that the ore would be "further processed into 400,000–800,000 tonnes of ferrochrome". The purchase was finalized in 2010. (Note: According to the Northern Miner article Cliff's 2009 acquisition included "Freewest's 100%-owned Black Thor and Black Label deposits, and 50% of its Big Daddy deposit, which Freewest has joint-ventured with Spider Resources (SPQ-V) and KWG Resources (KWG-V). Cliffs already owns 19.9% of KWG Resources, which holds a 25% stake in the Big Daddy deposit.")

According to Carrabba the area of the Ring of Fire that Cliffs acquired in 2009 represented one of the "premier chromite deposits in the world." In January 2010, Cliffs acquired Freewest Resources Canada for C$240 million, giving it 100% ownership of the Black Thor and Black Label, and 47% ownership of the Big Daddy chromite deposits in the Ring of Fire district. In July 2010, Cliffs increased its ownership stake in Big Daddy by acquiring Spider Resources for C$125 million. In 2015, these assets would be sold to Noront Resources, owner of a minority stake in Big Daddy, for US$20 million.

=== 2010 - 2015 ===
In January 2010, Chief Eli Moonias, Webequie Chief Cornelius Wabasse, and community members set up a blockade on the landing strips at Koper and McFaulds Lakes in order to prevent Noront Resources to build their own landing strip or building roads to the nearby community airstrip. Moonias explained that his community had been working on building their own access road since approximately 2000 and that if Noront Resources completed a road, then government intervention would prevent the Matawa Tribal Council from continuing their project. Moonias stated "If the corridor is built where we don’t want it, our road is not going to happen because the government and environmental people will only allow one corridor. We want the corridor to come through our area so we can get that access road and also get the benefits that will (come) when this corridor is built.” Martens Falls and Webequie First Nations ended their blockade on March 19, 2010, warning that they would resume the action if their concerns were not addressed by Noront within six months. Although the protest ended, Noront continued to use the frozen lakes as landing strips.

In 2011, environmental assessments by the Canadian federal and Ontario provincial governments began for Cliffs Natural Resources' proposed Black Thor Project and Noront Resources's Eagles Nest Project, with both companies volunteering "to make their projects subject to an environmental assessment under the Ontario Environmental Assessment Act (EAA) and are completing environmental assessments under the Canadian Environmental Assessment Act (CEAA)". In 2011, Ontario's Ministry of Northern Development and Mines created the Ring of Fire Secretariat, with Christine Kaszyckias as its coordinator, to develop "the chromite and other deposits in the Ring of Fire as quickly as possible and with due regard to environmental impacts and the needs of the Aboriginal communities within the region". It outlined strategies regarding First Nations partnerships, including resource revenue sharing, (Note: Mining royalties flow to the Province of Ontario not to the First Nations on whose land the mines are located. Victor Mine/Attawapiskat) regional infrastructure planning, long-term environmental monitoring, community-based capacity funding, relationship agreements, land use planning, employment and income assistance, skills development, training and job creation, transportation and community infrastructure, and socio-economic and community development in response to concerns by industry and First Nations communities.

On April 1, 2011, Attawapiskat, Fort Albany, and Neskantaga First Nations declared a moratorium on all development in the Ring of Fire, doubting that a planned Regional Impact Assessment (RIA) would not be thorough enough. Kate Kempton, lawyer and spokesperson for Attawapisakat First Nation, stated concerns that the RIA's focus would be too narrow and not take into consideration specific details such as caribou pathways, wetland destruction and replacement, or percentages of the lowlands that must be left untouched to avoid climate collapse.

On May 9 2012, Cliffs Natural Resources announced its intention of investing $3.3 billion in Northern Ontario's Ring of Fire region, which would include a chromite mine, a transportation corridor and a smelter in Sudbury, Ontario. Cliffs initially invested $550 million to acquire and begin development. In a letter dated May 8, 2012, Ontario Premier Dalton McGuinty wrote to Canadian Prime Minister Stephen Harper, informing him of Cliffs Natural Resources' announcement the next day and invited the Federal government to "take a more active role in supporting the tremendous economic development opportunity associated with the Ring of Fire." McGuinty wrote that Canada needed to deal with the inadequate infrastructure supporting First Nations peoples and that there must be immediate investment in the First Nations communities located in the Ring of Fire so that a "that a healthy and skilled First Nations workforce will be ready to participate fully in the many opportunities presented by this development." In this letter, McGuinty called for a "tripartite process" in engaging with the Ring of Fire, with both governments as well as Cliffs Natural Resources working in partnership together. On May 24, 2012, it was revealed that McGuinty and Harper engaged in a secret meeting in a hotel in downtown Toronto. When asked about the meeting, McGuinty said that the pair had spent most of that hour discussing the Ring of Fire, stating "I think I piqued his real curiosity, if not his real interest."

On 12 November 2012, Tony Clement was appointed as the lead federal minister on the Ring of Fire and co-chair, with Minister of Aboriginal Affairs and Northern Development Bernard Valcourt, of the Federal Steering Committee (FCS), which represents 15 federal departments. Clement invited Ontario Natural Resources minister Michael Gravelle "to collaborate on projects, community visits, information-sharing, and to hold joint meetings". Aboriginal Affairs and Northern Development Canada (AANDC) led other federal departments and FedNor in the development of Action Plan for Supporting Community Participation in the Ring of Fire to help "position First Nations to benefit from proposed mining projects".On 26 April 2013, Tony Clement called the Ring of Fire the oil sands of Ontario. On 13 June 2013, Cliffs announced it would put its $3.3-billion project on hold pending results of negotiations between First Nations and Queen's Park. Clement said that the Ring of Fire would bring "about a hundred years of mining activity that will spin-off jobs and economic activity for generations".

By 2012, there were 30,000 claims, 35 prospecting companies, and significant discoveries of chromium, copper, zinc, nickel, platinum, vanadium and gold; there were only two major development proposals, Noront Resources's Eagle's Nest Project and Cliffs Natural Resources. KWG Resources entered into a joint venture agreement with Bold Ventures (TSX:BOL) on its $5 million Koper Lake Project. In February 2013, Richard Nemis, CEO of Bold Ventures, obtained a Marten Falls First Nation Land Use Permit to operate the camp using "three diamond drills provided by Cyr International Drilling and Orbit Garant Drilling" to carry out approximately 6,000 metres (20,000 ft) of diamond drilling on nickel‐copper and chromite targets. Operator Bold Ventures was required to cease drilling activities from March 31, 2012, until April 13, 2013, to ensure the First Nations' permit was granted under the Mining Act, and a permit issued by a Director of Exploration from the Ministry of Northern Development and Mines was obtained. Probe Mines owned the entire Victory Project, which consists of "452 claims totaling 7,232 hectares and covers the interpreted southeast extension of the McFauld's Lake" and the Tamarack Project which "comprises 360 claims covering over 5,700 hectares of the McFauld's Lake in the Ring of Fire".

Environmental concerns listed in a Lakehead University 2012 report regarding Noront Resources's Eagle's Nest Project include pipeline leaks, a "a large edge effect", a "significant loss of biodiversity at local & regional level" from "linear constructions" such as roads. Despite state-of-the-art technology, environmental risks of underground pipelines in the wetlands, excluding the risk of leaks, include alterations of "hydrology, thermal regime, soil structure and vegetation of ecosystem".

The Eagle’s Nest Mine is expected to produce “3,000 tonnes of ore per day, which will be mined by underground methods and processed to deliver 150,000 to 250,000 tonnes of nickel-bearing concentrate per year." According to Noront Resources, citing its extensive discussions with local communities and other stakeholders, the company says its design will be the first mine to have all its tailings remain underground and “100% of process plant water will be recycled to minimize the discharge of effluents.” Further, it is reported to reach commercial production 3 years after permits are received and its mine life is expended to be 11 years, with the possibility of an additional 9.

In March 2013, Cliffs suspended the project "after numerous delays and difficult discussions with the province [of Ontario] and the First Nations communities". In March 2015, Cliffs would sell its assets to Noront Resources Ltd. for USD20 million.

In February 2013, KWG released a report commissioned by the engineering firm Tetra Tech regarding the viability of building a railroad, instead of a road, to access chromite in the Ring of Fire. Big Daddy chromite deposit to CN Rail (CN) near Nakina, Ontario. According to KWG, KWG's 100 percent owned subsidiary, Canada Chrome Corporation, had "conducted a $15 million surveying and soil testing program for the engineering and construction of a railroad to the Ring of Fire from Exton, Ontario." The February 2013 Tetra Tech engineering firm report said that concluded that a railroad would provide better access to ore in the Ring of Fire than a road.

In briefing notes for a meeting on February 4 2013, Tony Clement was warned that Matawa First Nation communities were among the "most socio-economically challenged in Ontario, impacting their ability to meaningfully participate in large complex projects". In this document, the MP was informed that chronic housing shortages, low education outcomes, and a lack of clean drinking water would "jeopardize the ability of local First Nations to benefit from the significant economic, employment, and business development opportunities associated with Ring of Fire developments." The document suggested that without "developing Aboriginal Human Capital," there would not be enough capacity in the communities to provide the amount of supplies and skilled labour that current development plans anticipated to be available.

By April 2013, Canada Chrome Corporation, had "staked a 330 km (210 mi)-kilometre-long "string of mining claims" which would eventually provide a transportation corridor from the Big Daddy chromite deposit to CN Rail (CN) near Nakina, Ontario. In an April 2013 interview, Moe Lavigne, VP of KWG Resources, a former Ontario Geological Survey geologist, said that the federal government would consider Tetra Tech's findings. Lavigne, said that they had staked mining claims to eventually build the railroad and make their stranded assets "viable." Lavigne said that "Ontario's Mining Act would safeguard his company's corridor claims."

In June 2013, under the Liberal government of Kathleen Wynne, former Ontario premier Bob Rae was appointed as chief negotiator to represent the nine different native governments—Marten Falls First Nation, Webequie First Nation, Neskantaga First Nation, Nibinamik First Nation, Aroland First Nation, Long Lake 58 First Nation, Ginoogaming First Nation, Eabametoong First Nation, Mishkeegogamang First Nation, and Constance Lake First Nation for the Matawa First Nations—in talks with the Ontario government about the opening of First Nations lands to the Ring of Fire development. Noront's Eagle's Nest copper and nickel mine and the Black Thor chromite mine of Cliffs Natural Resources would generate wealth and royalties for Ontario, but the mines are in a remote region. They will "require significant development to make them viable". "[D]evelopment that will have a profound effect on the local native communities, five of which are not yet accessible by road." By 2014, a "regional-framework agreement between the Matawa Tribal Council was the provincial government was reached. Retired Supreme Court justice Frank Iacobucci negotiated on behalf of the province and former premier Bob Rae on behalf of the Matawa, "set the terms for how future projects related to the proposed Ring of Fire would be finalized. It was intended to serve as a model for Crown-Indigenous relations on major resource-extraction projects." In late August 2019, MPP Greg Rickford announced that the province of Ontario was dissolving the regional-framework agreement in 90 and that this would come into effect in 90 days. Rickford said that, "Frankly, to this point, it’s been a little complicated and lengthy, It has not necessarily met the timelines that the market should expect a project to come on board."

=== 2016 - 2018 ===
In August of 2016, Neskantaga First Nation sent a cease and desist letter to Noront Resources after the company notified Neskantaga's leadership that drilling operations would begin within the month. In response, Noront President Al Coutts announced there were no plans to stop drilling activities and that when it came to dealing with First Nations, "you try to make the best efforts you can to communicate your activities and be clear about what you plan and live up to some of the commitments." In a CBC interview regarding these events, Neskantaga Chief Wayne Moonias claimed the government was "ignoring" the United Nations Declaration on the Rights of Indigenous Peoples and that it was "unacceptable" for the government to issue permits without First Nations consult or involvement.

In the spring of 2016, engineers from China Railway Group Limited (FSDI), a Xi'an-based firm owned by the Government of China through the China Railway Engineering Corporation, and KWG's Moe Lavigne visited the Ring of Fire in Northern Ontario to explore a potential north–south route for a chromite ore-haul railroad from the Ring of Fire. KWG's Chinese partners feasibility study had concluded that the route that traverses the traditional territory of the Marten Falls First Nation (MFFN) to reach Nakina in northwestern Ontario, was a "viable alignment". In April 2017, KWG also requested a guarantee of a billion dollars from Ontario's Ring of Fire Infrastructure Development Corporation (ROFIDC) to use as "consideration for project financing terms from Chinese lenders."

In May 2017, representatives from KWG and the Marten Falls First Nation (MFFN), made an official visit to FSDI headquarters in Xi'an, China. The FSDI feasibility study estimated that the capital cost of building the Far North railroad would be about $2 billion, says a June 2017 Northern Ontario Business article. The same article said that the proposed railroad would transport 10 million tonnes of chromite annually by 2030, potentially growing to a yearly volume of up to 24 million tonnes by 2040. To complete the project, KWG was seeking financing from both China and the Government of Ontario, including supply agreements with the Chinese stainless steel industry.

According to an April 2017 Northern Ontario Business article, KWG said it was "working towards" creating an "equal partnership" to develop the chromite deposit with one of the First Nation's communities, Marten Falls First Nation, whose traditional territory includes the Ring of Fire nickel and chromite deposits and would also be traversed by the proposed north-south railway. The five Ring of Fire mining companies began planning on extending partnership offers to other nearby communities such as Aroland First Nation and Webequie First Nation, the Northern Ontario Business said. Aroland First Nation signed a memorandum of understanding (MOU) with Norand on June 6, 2019, regarding the development of Norand's Eagle's Nest nickel and base metal deposit.

KWG CEO Smeenk proposed the creation of the James Bay & Lowlands Transportation Authority, which would be "similar to an airport or port authority". He said that the federal government should participate in the Ring of Fire development by creating James Bay & Lowlands Transportation Authority—"similar to a port or airport"— for the purpose of transporting ore from the Ring of Fire to Sault Ste. Marie where there is already a port and a rail line. The railway runs from Sault Ste. Marie to Hearst which is "half way to the Ring of Fire". Smeenk told Postmedia that in the current "political realities" and "regulatory environments", in order to extract minerals from the Ring of Fire and to avoid "political whims" from preventing the extraction of the minerals in the future, it was necessary to do "business with the United States."

KWG hosted a fundraising event on April 5, 2018, at Toronto's original stock exchange on Bay Street in support of the establishment of the Transportation Authority to facilitate the transport of chromite ore "from the Ring of Fire to a proposed KWG processing plant in Sault Ste. Marie." Invited guests included Premier Doug Ford, Maxime Bernier, and Chief Jason Gauthier, of the Missinabie Cree First Nation. KWG CEO Smeenk said that the transportation corridor would "ensure the viability" of the Algoma Central Railway, which is one of the goals of the Missanabie First Nation. The invitation for the April 5 event announced a discussion on the merits of "making ferrochrome in Sault Ste. Marie, Michigan for a new North American stainless steel joint-venture with Sault Ste. Marie, Ontario." Sault Ste. Marie's Mayor Christian Provenzano said in a March 22 news report, expressed concern that he was not aware of this joint venture, nor were their "partners in Sault Ste. Marie, Michigan." The news report said that "KWG is believed to be interested in partnering with the United States to take advantage of President Donald Trump's 'America First' approach to international trade."

On May 10 2017, Ontario Premier Kathleen Wynne submitted a letter to the Chiefs of the Matawa First Nations, warning them not to "squander" her previous 2014 commitment to spending $1 billion dollars to construct a year-round access road into the James Bay Lowlands. Wynne threatened to walk away from collective agreements and to approach each individual Chief to ensure cooperation. In August 2017, Ontario Premier Kathleen Wynne re-pledged support for the project, announcing the construction of a year-round access road from Nibinamik and Webequie First Nations, to Ontario Highway 599 at Pickle Lake, which would "also facilitate access to the Ring of Fire, located about 575 km (357 mi) north of Thunder Bay.

In March 2018, Leader of the Ontario Progressive Conservative Party Doug Ford promised that the Ring of Fire mining project would move forward immediately if elected even if "If I have to hop on that bulldozer myself."

=== 2019 - 2022 ===
By 2019, the mining company with the most holdings in the Ring of Fire was the Canadian company—Noront Resources Ltd.—with palladium, nickel, platinum, and copper deposit in Eagle's Nest, and chromite deposits including Big Daddy, Black Thor, and Blackbird.

In late August 27, 2019, in Sault Ste. Marie, Ontario's Minister of Energy, Northern Development and Mines (MENDM), Greg Rickford, said that the regional framework agreement negotiated in 2014 under between the province and the nine Matawa First Nations, had cost over $20 million and that funding had run out for the agreement in late 2018. Rickford said he was taking a more "pragmatic" approach with the goal of removing delays to projects, with the north-south corridor that at the top of the list. Rickford wants to work on a series of bilateral agreements with individual communities that would "not only could lead to road access to the mineral-rich James Bay lowlands, but can also connect by road, as well as add to the provincial power grid and expand modern telecommunications to, 'at least four, five Indigenous communities.'" In a CBC interview he said that, the transportation corridor would have "additional health and social and economic benefits that move beyond the more obvious opportunities of creating mines ... To the extent that Noront [Resources] or other mining companies could build mines on that corridor, then we have a great value proposition.". The mining company, Noront Resources, which holds the largest Ring of Fire claims, and Marten Falls First Nation issued a joint statement welcoming Rickford's announcement. At the time, Marten Falls was the proponent of an environmental assessment for the first stage of an access road connecting the community to an all-season road. On the same day, Noront announced that they had issued "300,000 shares to Marten Falls First Nation and 150,000 shares to Aroland First Nation" as part of their Project Advancement Agreement.

By the fall of 2020, the Ring of Fire was considered "one of the largest potential mineral reserves in Ontario" with "more than 35 junior and intermediate mining and exploration companies covering an area of about "1.5 million hectares". Although the Ring of Fire crescent covers 5,000 square kilometres (approximately 1,930 square miles), most discoveries made by 2012 were within a twenty-kilometre-long strip. Ontario's Minister of Northern Development, Mines and Forestry Michael Gravelle called the region "home to one of the most promising mineral development opportunities in Ontario in more than a century". Tony Clement, Canada's Treasury Board President and the FedNor minister responsible for the Ring of Fire, claimed it will be the economic equivalent of the Athabasca oil sands, with a potential of generating $120 billion. Clement said the Ring of Fire represented a "once-in-a-life opportunity to create jobs and generate growth and long-term prosperity for northern Ontario and the nation". Clement claimed that "challenges" preventing the development of the Ring of Fire mineral included lack of access to the remote region, infrastructure deficits such as roads, railway, electricity and broadband, First Nations land rights, and environmental issues in the James Bay Lowlands, the "third largest wetland in the world". Clement's approach was to look to business, not the federal government, to invest "in power and transportation infrastructure to develop the deposit".

In March 2020, at the Prospectors and Developers Association of Canada convention, Ontario Premier Doug Ford and Minister of Indigenous affairs, Greg Rickford, met Marten Falls Chief Bruce Achneepineskum and Webequie First Nation Chief Cornelius Wabasse for a signing ceremony. This ceremony solidified the partnership between the two First Nations and the Ontario government regarding all-season road infrastructure, but the legality of the agreement is presently being questioned.

In January 2021, the Australian company Wyloo Metals, announced its intent to acquire a controlling interest in Noront Resources. Wyloo’s offer of $0.70 a share (CAD), trumped the competing offer of $0.55 (CAD) a share made by BHP group. In March 2022, Noront Resources shareholders, with a 98.9 per cent majority, approved the sale of the Toronto junior miner's mineral assets in the North to Wyloo Metals, for $616.9 million. The head of the company, Luca Giacovazzi, noted that de-carbonizing the economy is a priority for Wyloo, stating that the company “started spending a lot of time looking at things like electric vehicles and batteries, and that sort of led us down the path of nickel.” The metals company committed $25 million in a feasibility study to look into building battery material in Ontario, as well as targeting $100 million in contracts with Indigenous communities to create jobs in communities and promising training for Indigenous workers.

It is notable that throughout its nearly-year long campaign to purchase Noront Resources, Wyloo spoke highly of founder Andrew Forrest's success with Fortescue Metal Group (FMG). In 2015, the Federal Court of Australia found that the company under Forrest's leadership "had clandestinely helped to fund and organize an attempt by the breakaway group to oust the leadership of the Yindjibarndi Aboriginal Corporation as the Native Title holder for the community, replace it with members of their own group and adopt a legal position favourable to Fortescue." In 2020, the High Court of Australia refused to hear FMG's appeal.

In late 2021, it was reported that access to the Ring of Fire required 450 kilometres of new roads to Ontario’s provincial highway system. In October of 2021, Neskantaga First Nations called for Ontario's Auditor General to investigate the proposed $1.6 billion dollars budgeted for the creation of three four-season roads to the Ring of Fire. Questions of ownership, access usage, funding sources, and exact figures remained unanswered, leading to a CBC News investigation that managed to confirm the costs of the project being estimated as between $1.1 billion to $1.6 billion dollars with an approximate average of $2.69 million dollars per kilometre of road. In addition, it was revealed that the Ontario government had already requested somewhere between $557 and $779 million in federal funding.

On November 4 2021, the Province of Ontario released its 2021 Fall Economic Statement which proposed amendments to the Far North Act of 2010 in order to "support a more stable environment for investment". In an unrelated press conference on November 8 2021, Ontario Premier Doug Ford addressed a question regarding planned Ring of Fire development as such: "We're doing it...We're going to be the number one manufacturer of electric battery operated cars in North America. We're not only going to manufacture the batteries here, but also manufacture the cars."

In December 2021, the Federal Impact Assessment Agency released the draft terms of reference for the Ring of Fire regional assessment, allowing First Nations involved 60 days for public engagement and comments. Following a meeting with five of the First Nations chiefs on January 17, 2022, this deadline is extended until March 2, 2022 "in recognition of the extenuating circumstances arising from the COVID-19 pandemic and its impact on Indigenous communities." In a letter dated January 18, the chiefs of Neskantaga, Eabametoong, Fort Albany, Kashechewan and Attawapiskat wrote a letter to Environment Minister Steven Guilbeault that the draft terms of reference were "fundamentally flawed in their scope, purpose, and legitimacy" and that the document as it stands "promotes recklessness and danger." At the time, the draft terms of references had no indication that Indigenous communities or governing bodies would have any decision-making power within the assessment, despite legislation "explicitly allowing agreements and power-sharing with Indigenous governing bodies."

=== 2023 - Present ===
Federal Natural Resources Minister Jonathan Wilkinson said that the Georgia Lake lithium project, KGHM's Victoria mine proposal and the Onaping Depth nickel project were a higher priority than the Ring of Fire for federal investment. The Ring of Fire is situated in a region of "vast, environmentally sensitive...peatlands". The federal government's goal of developing minerals that are crucial for the shift to a low carbon economy conflicts with the province's plans for a "Ring of Fire" as a "mining bonanza". Wilkinson said that they have identified mining projects in Ontario that are nearer to infrastructure that already exists.

On March 29 2023, chief-elect Chris Moonias of Neskantaga First Nation and four other leaders of the formed First Nations Land Defence Alliance walked out of a question period at the Ontario Legislature. In this question period, Opposition Leader Sol Mamakwa (NDP - Kiiwentinoog) asked "Will this government commit today to obtain the consent of First Nations before making any plans for their homelands?". After Minister of Indigenous Affairs Greg Rickford's replies to Mamakwa's questions was deemed unsatisfactory, Moonias shouted from the gallery: "No consent, no Ring of Fire!" All five leaders stood up and left in protest, reportedly escorted out by security.

In late April of 2023, ten Chiefs of Treaty 9 First Nations announced a lawsuit seeking $95 billion in damages for Treaty 9 First Nations and injunctions to prevent both provincial and federal government from regulating or enforcing regulations in the treaty lands without the consent of the plaintiffs. The plaintiffs argued that the Treaty 9 First Nations never ceded their rights of land management and called for a co-jurisdiction regime where the province and Ottawa cannot move forward on land development without their approval. They further suggested that in the cases of future disputes, they should be addressed to an independent third party, similar to other international agreements.

On March 19 2025, in Sudbury, Ontario, Pierre Poilievre, the leader of the Conservative Party of Canada (CPC), promised that as Prime Minister he would speed up federal mining permits and spend $1 billion to build a road linking the Ring of Fire to the Ontario highway network.

On September 10 2025, Ontario Indigenous Affairs Minister Greg Rickford announced that Ontario would spend $61.8 million dollars to begin building the first section of the "Corridor of Prosperity." This section will be approximately five-kilometers, connecting Highway 11 to Highway 584 through the newly refurbished Main Street of Geraldton, Ontario.

== 2025 Federal and Provincial Legislation ==
=== Bill 5 (Government of Ontario) ===
On April 17 2025, Bill 5 was first read at the Legislative Assembly of Ontario. After second and third readings on May 6 and June 4 respectively, Bill 5 was given Royal Assent on June 5, 2025. Bill 5's stated purpose was to enact the Special Economic Zones Act, 2025, to replace the Endangered Species Act, 2007 with the Species Conservation Act, 2025, and to "amend various Acts and revoke various regulations in relation to development and to procurement." The Act is now known as the Protect Ontario by Unleashing our Economy Act, 2025. The Act allows for the designation of any location in Ontario as a special economic zone, where the government can exempt companies or projects from complying with provincial laws or regulations.

Shortly after Royal Assent was given on June 5, 2025, Premier Doug Ford stated that Ontario intended to designate the Ring of Fire as a special economic zone "as quickly as possible." On June 18, 2025, Ford stated that the First Nations of Ontario "just can't keep coming hat in hand all the time to the government...and when you literally have gold mines, nickel mines, every type of critical mineral that the world wants and you're saying, no, no, I don't wanna touch that, by the way give me money; not going to happen, it's simple." He apologized the next day, claiming: "I get passionate because I want prosperity for their communities."

=== Bill C-5 (Government of Canada) ===
On June 26 2025, Bill C-5, the One Canadian Economy Act received Royal Assent. Similar to Ontario's Bill 5, the One Economy Act allows the Government of Canada to fast-track project development by side-stepping environmental protections and other legislation. An initial draft of the bill gave the Federal Government the power to ignore rights granted under the Indian Act, but that law was removed before Bill C-5 was passed. Senator Paul Prosper proposed an amendment to ensure projects could not be approved without of the consent of affected communities but it failed to pass. Prosper, who is Mi'kmaq, said that after he spoke out on the rushed nature of Bill C-5 that "the racist vitriol and threats my office experienced was so intense, staff asked for permission to not pick up unknown phone calls."

=== Indigenous Responses ===
On July 14 2025, nine First Nations applied to Ontario's Superior Court of Justice for an injunction to prevent Ontario and Canada from declaring any special economic zones or national interest projects either permanently or while the lawsuit is ongoing. Two of the First Nations, Aroland and Ginoogaming, had previously signed deals with the Ford government on Ring of Fire related projects. Ginoogaming First Nation Chief Sheri Taylor condemned Ford's and Prime Minister Mark Carney's responses to U.S. Tariffs, arguing that "panicking over the short term is not a reason to sacrifice the very values Canada says it holds dear and long term viability of lands and people." Aorland First Nation Sonny Gagnon stated that his Nation had never consented to mining the Ring of Fire, but had agreed to construction of road access to Marten Falls First Nation as well as development of basic electrical infrastructure. Doug Ford took offence to Gagnon's comments and speaking at Intersect/25 on June 9 2025, the Premier insisted: "Mark my words in this room, he will be moving forward with us, not because of me, not because of pressuring me, because he's a smart man, and he understands his community needs to prosper."

In August 2025, Marten Falls First Nations filed for interim and permanent injunctions preventing Ontario or Canada from "funding" or "participating" in mining-related activities in the Ring of Fire. Their claim centred on evidence from previous massive projects in the region. Chief Bruce Achneepineskum stated his people have seen the ill-effects of development on their territory without their consent, with the water diversion in the 1930s through 1950s destroying fish populations and drying up canoe routes, and there is concern that federal and provincial laws Bill C-5 and Bill 5 have the power to override environmental protection laws to do such damage again. Marten Falls also filed for $300 million in compensation for these historical hydroelectric projects which the First Nation claimed were done without their consent.

== See also ==
- Plan Nord
- Roads to Resources Program
- Mid-Canada Corridor
- Geology of Ontario
- Ring of Fire, a series of oceanic trenches and volcanoes around the Pacific Ocean.
