= Nishnawbe-Aski Police Service =

Agency overview
- Formed: 1994

Operational structure
- Headquarters: 973 Balmoral St; Thunder Bay, Ontario
- Officers: 203
- Civilians: 30
- Elected officer responsible: The Honourable Sylvia Jones, Minister of Community Safety and Correctional Services
- Agency executive: Terry Armstrong (Interim), Chief of Police

Facilities
- Divisions: 34

Website
- Official website

The Nishnawbe-Aski Police Service (NAPS), also occasionally known as the Nishnawbe Aski Police Service (without a hyphen) is the police agency for Nishnawbe-Aski Nation (NAN). As of July 2020, NAPS has 34 detachments in NAN communities across the territory covered by Treaty 9 and Treaty 5 within Ontario. Roland Morrison was sworn in as chief of police in 2019.

As of July 2020, the agency has 203 officers, about 60% of whom are Indigenous, making NAPS the largest Indigenous police force in Canada, and the second-largest in North America. NAPS is responsible for a jurisdiction that includes two-thirds of Ontario, a land area approximately the size of France. NAPS receives 48% of its funding from the government of Ontario, and 52% from the government of Canada.

== History ==
The Nishnawbe-Aski Police Service was formed on January 14, 1994 through a tri-partite agreement between the governments of Canada, Ontario, and the Nishnawbe-Aski Nation. The primary goal of the agreement was the establishment of an aboriginal agency to provide efficient, effective and culturally appropriate policing to the Nishnawbe-Aski communities.

The first phase of the agreement began on April 1, 1994 and lasted four years, when all First Nation constable positions were transferred from the Ontario Provincial Police (OPP) to NAPS. Phase two began on January 1, 1998 when Wahgoshig, Matachewan, Mattagami, Brunswick House, Chapleau Ojibwe, Chapleau Cree, Constance Lake and Aroland First Nations were transferred.

The Nishnawbe-Aski Police Service gained responsibility for the OPP's Northwest Patrol Unit on June 1, 1998, excluding the communities of Big Trout Lake, Weagamow, Muskrat Dam, and Pikangikum. An Operations Transition Committee was formed to oversee the transfer of administrative and operations matter between NAPS and the OPP. The transition was complete on April 1, 1999.

== Hardships ==
Many NAPS detachments fail to meet national building codes and many officers live in crowded conditions or lack residences in the communities in which they serve. On February 25, 2008 Chief Jonathan Soloman of Kashechewan First Nation gave the Government of Ontario 30 days to start relieving the situation or he would pull his community out of the NAPS policing agreement. On March 26, 2008, Chief Soloman extended the deadline after receiving indication that the Canadian and Ontario governments were interested in resolving policing issues in NAPS-served communities. A new policing agreement was reached in 2009.

As of February 2008, only one of the thirty-five detachments met building codes (that in the Moose Cree First Nation). A fire at the Kashechewan First Nation detachment on January 9, 2006 killed two persons held in the lockup and severely injured an officer during a rescue attempt.

The Kasabonika First Nation detachment was closed in early February 2008 as it lacked running water and relied on a wood fire in a 170-litre drum to heat the facility. Holding cells lacked toilet facilities, requiring detainees to use a slop bucket. Prisoners had to be flown to Sioux Lookout, costing as much as $10,000 per trip. As of February 2013, the Kasabonika detachment was operational, although it had only one on-duty officer.

As of February 2008, NAPS had an annual budget of $23,000,000, and the estimated cost to replace or renovate aging detachments was approximately $34,000,000. A new funding agreement was reached in 2018, allowing the hiring of 79 new officers over a five-year period, along with upgrades to key infrastructure and communications systems. However, the police force remains poorly funded, with a 2020 operations budget of around $37,700,000 and expenses approaching $40,000,000.

== A Sacred Calling ==
A Sacred Calling is an 18-minute documentary which focuses on the difficulties of policing remote NAN communities in Northern Ontario which are compounded by insufficient funding. The documentary was made by National Chief of the Assembly of First Nations RoseAnne Archibald, who hopes the film will get attention from the federal and provincial governments to help rectify the situation. The film shows officers living in motels, and using wood blocks to hold inmates in their cells.

== Detachments ==
Detachments are located in 34 communities. NAPS headquarters is located at 309 Court Street South, Thunder Bay. It has regional offices in Cochrane, Sioux Lookout and Thunder Bay.

Northeast Region - Cochrane

- Attawapiskat First Nation
- Brunswick House First Nation
- Chapleau Cree First Nation
- Chapleau Ojibwe First Nation
- Fort Albany First Nation
- Kashechewan First Nation
- Matachewan First Nation
- Mattagami First Nation
- Moose Cree First Nation
- Taykwa Tagamou Nation
- Wahgoshig First Nation
- Weenusk First Nation

Northwest Region - Sioux Lookout

- Bearskin Lake First Nation
- Cat Lake First Nation
- Deer Lake First Nation
- Fort Severn First Nation
- Keewaywin First Nation
- Mishkeegogamang First Nation
- Muskrat Dam Lake First Nation
- North Spirit Lake First Nation
- Poplar Hill First Nation
- Sachigo Lake First Nation
- Sandy Lake First Nation
- Slate Falls First Nation

Central Region - Thunder Bay

- Aroland First Nation
- Constance Lake First Nation
- Eabametoong First Nation
- Kasabonika First Nation
- Kingfisher First Nation
- Marten Falls First Nation
- Lansdowne House
- Nibinamik First Nation
- Webequie First Nation
- Wunnumin Lake First Nation

== Governance ==
The Nishnawbe-Aski Police Service is governed by a board consisting of a representative of each Nishnawbe-Aski Nation Tribal Council. An independent review board ensures accountability to the communities. NAPS is not subject to the Ontario Police Services Act, though as a result of the 2018 funding agreement, there is pending Ontario legislation to allow NAPS to opt in to the Police Services Act, which would mandate accountability standards and oversight.

== Former Chiefs ==
Name	Start of Term	End of Term	Notes	References
Terry Armstrong	March 2024 (Interim)	Current		
Roland Morrison	September 2019	March 2024 (Suspended) November 2024(Terminated)	Member of Chapleau Cree First Nation. First chief of police to have risen through the ranks from front-line officer. Served as acting chief of police since his predecessor's retirement in September 2018, named as chief by the Board of Directors effective April 9, 2019.	
Terry Armstrong	September 3, 2013	September 2018		
Robert Herman	January 23, 2013	September 3, 2013	Served as acting chief of police for NAPS, formerly worked as Thunder Bay Police Service Police Chief.	
Claude Chum	January 1, 2011	January 23, 2013	Member of the Moose Cree First Nation. On January 23, 2013, Chum announced in a letter to the Board of Directors he was taking an "indefinite personal leave of absence."	
Robin Jones	November 11, 2009	January 1, 2010	Served as acting chief of police. First female chief of police.	
John C. Domm	July 2008	November 11, 2009	Member of the Chippewas of Nawash Unceded First Nation. Served as acting chief of police from July 2008, named as chief of police before February 20, 2009.	
Paul Russell Trivett	January 2006	July 2008	Died August 27, 2008.	
Wesley Luloff	1994	2005	Became staff sergeant of NAPS in 1994, after serving with the RCMP for 23 years. Longest-serving chief of police, as of July 2020.	

== Fleet ==
- Ford F-Series pickups including F-350
- Dodge Charger cruisers
- Ford E-Series vans
- Chevrolet Tahoe SUV - used by K9 unit
- Pilatus PC-12-45 - operated by Air Bravo

=== Retired ===
- Ford Crown Victoria cruisers - former
- Gmc Yukon SUV - former

== Ranks ==
- Constable
  - Detective Constable
- Sergeant
  - Detective Sergeant
  - Road Sergeant
- Staff Sergeant
- Administrative Sergeant
- Regional Inspector / Regional Commander
- Deputy Chief
- Chief of Police

== Special Units ==
- Emergency Response Team
- Crime Unit
- Intelligence Unit
- Drug Unit
