= Nishnawbe Aski Nation =

Political organisation representing First Nations in Northern Ontario, Canada

- ᓂᔑᓈᐯ ᐊᔅᑭ ᐅᑭᒫᐎᓐ
- NAN Logo
- Abbreviation: NAN
- Formation: Nishnawbe Aski Nation (known as Grand Council Treaty No. 9 until 1983) was established in 1973.
- Headquarters: Thunder Bay, Ontario
- Region served: Treaty 9, Northern Ontario
- Official language: English, Cree, Ojibwe, Oji-cree
- Grand Chief: Alvin Fiddler
- Website: nan.ca

Nishnawbe Aski Nation (ᐊᓂᐦᔑᓈᐯ ᐊᔅᑭ ᐃᔥᑯᓂᑲᓇᓐ ᐅᑭᒫᐎᓐ (Anishinaabe-aski Ishkoniganan Ogimaawin), unpointed: ᐊᓂᔑᓇᐯ ᐊᔅᑭ ᐃᔥᑯᓂᐊᓇᓐ ᐅᑭᒪᐎᓐ; NAN for short) is a political organization representing 51 First Nation communities across Treaty 9 and Treaty 5 areas of Northern Ontario, Canada. Re-organized to its present form in 1981, NAN's original objective was "to represent the social and economic aspirations of our people at all levels of government in Canada and Ontario until such time as real effective action is taken to remedy our problems."

Its member-First Nations are Ojibwa, Anisininew and Cree, and thus the languages within NAN include Ojibwemowin, Oji-cree and Cree. NAN's administrative offices are located in Thunder Bay, Ontario. The current Grand Chief is Alvin Fiddler.

== History ==
Founded as Grand Council of Treaty 9 in February, 1973, after a large anticipated deficit resulting from the anti-Reed Campaign and the Hart Commission of 1978, members of the Grand Council Treaty 9 re-organized in 1981 to become the Nishnawbe Aski Nation. After the first executive council of NAN was elected in March 1984, Grand Council Treaty No. 9 ceased to exist.

== Current leadership ==
- Grand Chief Alvin Fiddler
- Deputy Grand Chief Anna Betty Achneepineskum
- Deputy Grand Chief Bobby Narcisse
- Deputy Grand Chief Mike Metatawabin

== Demographics and geography ==
Nishnawbe Aski Nation represents 51 First Nation communities within northern Ontario. The total land-mass under James Bay Treaty No. 9 and Ontario’s portion of Treaty No. 5, which is covered by Nishnawbe Aski Nation, covers 2/3 of the province of Ontario. The land area is around 544,000 square km (210,000 square miles), which is around the same size as Yemen.

The population of membership (on and off reserve) estimated around 45,000 people.

== Departments ==
- Administration
- Centennial Commemoration
- Communications and Media
- Crisis and Suicide Prevention
- Education
- Employment Opportunities
- Executive Council
- Fiscal Relations
- Governance Secretariat
- Harvesting Unit
- Health
- Infrastructure and Housing
- Land Rights and Treaty
- Lands and Resources
- Residential School Project
- Social Services
- Treaty Discussion Forum
- Treaty Education Process
- Women's Council
- Youth

== Programs ==
- Aboriginal Diabetes Initiative
- Aboriginal Responsible Gambling Strategy
- AIDS and Healthy
- Chiropody Program
- Choose Life Program
- Decade for Youth and Development
- Family Violence Project
- Fetal Alcohol Spectrum Disorder/Child Nutrition Program
- Healthy Babies / Healthy Children Program
- NAN Crisis Team Funding and Training
- Peer Helping Program
- Recreation
- Residential School Project

== Affiliated First Nations ==
The 51 communities are grouped by Tribal Council according to region. They are Windigo First Nations Council, Wabun Tribal Council, Shibogama First Nations Council, Mushkegowuk Council, Matawa First Nations, Keewaytinook Okimakanak, and Independent First Nations Alliance. Three of the 51 communities are not affiliated with a specific Tribal Council.

- Mishkeegogamang First Nation
- MoCreebec Council of the Cree Nation
- Sandy Lake First Nation
- Independent First Nations Alliance
  - Kitchenuhmaykoosib Inninuwug First Nation (formerly known as Big Trout Lake First Nation)
  - Lac Seul First Nation
  - Muskrat Dam Lake First Nation
  - Pikangikum First Nation
  - Whitesand First Nation
- Keewaytinook Okimakanak Council (ᑮᐌᑎᓅᐠ ᐅᑭᒫᐦᑲᓇᐠ (Giiwedinoog Ogimaakanag))
  - Deer Lake First Nation (Oji-Cree: ᐊᑎᑯ ᓴᑲᐦᐃᑲᐣ)
  - Fort Severn First Nation (Swampy Cree: ᐗᔕᐦᐅ ᐃᓂᓂᐗᐠ)
  - Keewaywin First Nation (Oji-Cree:ᑮᐌᐎᐣ)
  - McDowell Lake First Nation (Oji-Cree: ᒥᔑ ᓴᑲᐦᐊᑲᓂᐣ)
  - North Spirit Lake First Nation (Oji-Cree: ᒣᒣᑴᔑ ᓴᑲᐦᐃᑲᐣ)
  - Poplar Hill First Nation (Ojibwe: ᐅᐸᓴᑎᑲᐠ)
- Matawa First Nations
  - Aroland First Nation
  - Constance Lake First Nation
  - Eabametoong First Nation
  - Hornepayne First Nation
  - Ginoogaming First Nation
  - Long Lake 58 First Nation
  - Marten Falls First Nation
  - Neskantaga First Nation (also known as Lansdowne House First Nation)
  - Nibinamik First Nation (also known as Summer Beaver First Nation)
  - Webequie First Nation
- Mushkegowuk Council (ᐅᒪᐡᑫᑯ ᐅᑭᒫᐎᐎᐣ (Omashkeko Okimāwiwin); also known as Mushkegowuk Tribal Council)
  - Attawapiskat First Nation
  - Chapleau Cree First Nation
  - Fort Albany First Nation Fort Albany, Ontario (also known as Albany First Nation)
  - Kashechewan First Nation
  - Missanabie Cree First Nation
  - Moose Cree First Nation
  - Taykwa Tagamou Nation (formerly known as New Post First Nation)
  - Weenusk First Nation
- Shibogama First Nations Council (ᔑᑄᑲᒫ ᓂᐢᑕᒼ ᐊᓂᐦᔑᓈᐯᐠ ᐅᓇᐦᔕᐌᓂᓂᐗᐠ (Zhibwagamaa Nistam-Anishinaabeg Onashaweniniwag))
  - Kasabonika First Nation
  - Kingfisher First Nation
  - Wapekeka First Nation
  - Wawakapewin First Nation
  - Wunnumin Lake First Nation
- Wabun Tribal Council
  - Beaverhouse First Nation
  - Brunswick House First Nation
  - Chapleau Ojibway First Nation
  - Flying Post First Nation
  - Matachewan First Nation
  - Mattagami First Nation
  - Wahgoshig First Nation
- Windigo First Nations Council
  - Bearskin Lake First Nation
  - Cat Lake First Nation Cat Lake, Ontario
  - Koocheching First Nation
  - North Caribou Lake First Nation
  - Sachigo Lake First Nation
  - Slate Falls First Nation
  - Whitewater First Nation
