= Wabun Tribal Council =

- Formation: October 1989; 37 years ago
- Headquarters: 313 Railway Street Timmins, Ontario P4N 2P4
- Location: Canada
- Members: 7 nations
- Executive Director: Jason Batise
- Affiliations: Nishnawbe Aski Nation
- Website: www.wabun.on.ca

Wabun Tribal Council is a non-profit Regional Chiefs' Council representing Ojibway and Cree First Nations in northern Ontario, Canada. The Council provides advisory services and program delivery to its seven Status and non-Status member-Nations.

== Background and mission ==
"Wabun" (from the Anishinaabe language: waaban) means "sunrise." Wabun Tribal Council was incorporated in October, 1989, and started operations in Timmins, Ontario, in April, 1990. The Tribal Council was formed under the Indian and Northern Affairs Canada (INAC) devolution policy to coordinate and deliver services devolved from INAC to First Nation communities at the local level.

Wabun Tribal Council states their mission as "providing quality services to its First Nation membership through innovative, culturally appropriate programming."

== Organization ==
The Council is made up of a representing Chief from each of the seven member communities: Beaverhouse First Nation, Brunswick House First Nation, Chapleau Ojibway First Nation, Flying Post First Nation, Matachewan First Nation, Mattagami First Nation, and Wahgoshig First Nation.

The Chiefs provide political direction to the organization in its strategic planning, government relations and policy development. To assist in these activities, the Council maintains a political and advocacy staff to support its efforts in helping their communities to prosper. In turn, the Council is a member of Nishnawbe Aski Nation, a Tribal Political Organization representing majority of Treaty 5 and Treaty 9 First Nations in northern Ontario. The council's activities are published and shared with the community through the council's Wabun Sun newsletter.

As of May 2023, Jason Batise was the Executive Director.

== Activities ==
- Management / Administration
- Financial Services
- Economic Development & Technical Services
- First Nations Government
- Education
- Health Services
  - C.H. Nursing Program
  - Patient Transportation Program
  - Diabetes Strategy
  - Crisis Team Coordination
  - Long Term Care
  - Health Advocacy & Representation
- Mamo-Nuskomitowin (Aboriginal Human Resources Development)
