= Mattagami =

Mattagami may refer to:

- Mattagami River, Northeastern Ontario, Canada
- Mattagami First Nation, situated near the Mattagami River

== See also ==
- Matagami, a town in Quebec, Canada
