= Hornepayne First Nation =

Coordinates: 49.234°N 84.774°W

- People: Ojibwe, Cree
- Treaty: Treaty 9
- Headquarters: 92 Sixth Avenue, Hornepayne
- Province: Ontario

Land
- Other reserve: none
- Land area: 0 km^{2} (0 sq mi)

Government
- Chief: Ron B. Kocsis
- Council: Isobel Peever; Napoleon Goulet

Tribal Council
- Matawa First Nations; Nishnawbe Aski Nation

Website
- http://hpfn.ca

Hornepayne First Nation is a non-status Ojibwe First Nation band government whose reserve is located north of Hornepayne, Ontario, Canada. They are members the Nishnawbe Aski Nation, a tribal political organization representing majority of Ojibwe and Cree First Nations in northern Ontario.
