= Alvin Fiddler =

Grand Chief of the Nishnawbe Aski Nation

- Born: Sioux Lookout, Ontario
- Education: University of Lethbridge (Business Management)
- Occupation: Grand Chief of the Nishnawbe Aski Nation
- Known for: Oji-Cree Grand Chief of Nishnawbe Aski Nation

Alvin Fiddler is Canadian Oji-Cree politician. Currently he serves as the Grand Chief of the Nishnawbe Aski Nation (NAN), a political organization representing 51 First Nation communities in Northern Ontario. A member of Muskrat Dam First Nation (an Oji-Cree First Nation), Fiddler previously served multiple terms as Deputy Grand Chief before first being elected Grand Chief in 2015. He is currently serving his third term in this role.

In 2025, Fiddler played a central role in negotiating a $8.5 billion Agreement to reform First Nations Child and Family Services in Ontario, alongside Chiefs of Ontario and the Canadian federal government.

In 2021, Alvin stepped down from his position at the NAN to launch an unsuccessful bid for National Chief of the Assembly of First Nations, before being acclaimed as Grand Chief once more in 2023 and then getting re-elected in 2024.

== Early life and education ==
Alvin Fiddler was born in Sioux Lookout and raised in Muskrat Dam First Nation. He left his community at age 13 to attend high school in Sioux Lookout and Thunder Bay, and studied business management at the University of Lethbridge.
