= McFaulds Lake =

Lake in Kenora District, Ontario, Canada

- Location in Ontario
- Location: Kenora District, Ontario
- Coordinates: 52°46′06″N 86°03′26″W
- Part of: James Bay drainage basin
- Primary outflows: Unnamed stream to Attawapiskat River
- Basin countries: Canada
- Max. length: 6 kilometres (3.7 mi)
- Max. width: 2.4 kilometres (1.5 mi)
- Surface elevation: 158 metres (518 ft)

McFaulds Lake is a lake located in the Unorganized Part of Kenora District in northwestern Ontario, Canada. It is part of the James Bay drainage basin and is in the Hudson Bay Lowlands area. There are two unnamed inflows, at the south and north. The primary outflow is an unnamed stream at the northeast leading to the Attawapiskat River, which itself flows to James Bay.

== Geology ==
McFaulds Lake is at the centre of the Northern Ontario Ring of Fire, a region of geological activity which has left a rich source of minerals, including nickel, copper, platinum, palladium, chromite, vanadium, diamond and gold, buried beneath the muskeg. Muskeg refers to a peat forming the ecosystem common in Arctic and boreal areas, although it is found in other northern climates as well.

=== Mining interests ===
The area near the lake has attracted the attention of junior mining exploration companies. Since a 2002 investigation of the area, some 20 companies have staked claims, forming joint ventures (JV). There have been numerous finds, though none have yet moved to the exploitation phase.

=== First Nations ===
First Nations communities in Northern Ontario are involved in the mining exploration. These communities include the Webequie First Nation and the Marten Falls First Nation.

== See also ==
- List of lakes in Ontario
