= Aroland First Nation =

- Location within Ontario
- Coordinates: 50°13′N 86°57′W
- Country: Canada
- Province: Ontario
- District: Thunder Bay
- First Nation: Aroland

Area
  - Land: 3.35 km^{2} (1.29 sq mi)

Population (2016)
  - Total: 366
  - Density: 109.1/km^{2} (283/sq mi)

Aroland First Nation (2016 Population 366) is a Ojibwa, Anisininew and Cree First Nation within the Nishnawbe Aski Nation Territory and a signatory to Treaty 9, located in the Thunder Bay District approximately 20 kilometres west of Nakina. Aroland First Nation, has Indian reserve status, though the settlement itself is not a reserve. The Aroland First Nation is also a member of the Matawa First Nations Tribal Council.

Located along the Canadian National Railway line, the community was originally named after the Arrow Land and Logging Company, which operated in the area from 1933 to 1941. Aroland First Nation's members are former members of the Long Lake 58 First Nation, Long Lac 77 First Nation (now Ginoogaming First Nation), Fort Hope First Nation (now Eabametoong First Nation), Marten Falls First Nation, and Fort William First Nation. In 1972, the settlement briefly was recorded as Aroland 83 Indian Reserve.

Aroland First Nation is policed by the Nishnawbe-Aski Police Service, an Aboriginal-based service.

== Governance ==
The current Chief is Sonny Gagnon, who is serving along with seven other Councillors: Eunice Magiskan, Joe Baxter, Bernard Gagnon, Tyrell Gagnon, Mark Bell, Annamarie Magiskan, and Chad Kashkesh.
