= New Post, Ontario =

Settlement in Ontario, Canada

Coordinates: 49.988373°N 81.535857°W

New Post was a Hudson's Bay Company post established on the Abitibi River in 1867. Prior to 1876, the post was sometimes known as Long Portage Post, reflecting its location below the long portage on the Abitibi River. A community later developed around the post, associated with the Cree and Ojibway.

== History ==
New Post is historically associated with the New Post Band, now the Taykwa Tagamou Nation, in the Moose River Basin of northeastern Ontario.

Treaty 9, also called the James Bay Treaty, was signed in 1905 at New Post and the first Chief of the New Post band (Taykwa Tagamou Nation) was Esau Omageese.
