= Daniel G. MacMartin =

Canadian civil servant

- Born: Daniel George MacMartin; 9 January 1844; Perth, Canada West
- Died: 12 April 1923 (aged 79); Perth, Ontario, Canada
- Resting place: Elmdale Cemetery, Perth, Ontario, Canada
- Citizenship: Canadian subject
- Occupation: Civil Servant
- Notable work: Treaty 9
- Spouse: (1)Margaret MacMartin (2) Janet Grant (1862–1959)
- Children: Margaret Charlotte MacMartin (1876–1906); Malcolm Morgan MacMartin (1879–1943); Allan Grant MacMartin (1894–1976); Georgina MacMartin (1896 - 1980 ) Hilda MacMartin (1900–1918)
- Parents: Daniel MacMartin (1798–1869) (father); Charlotte MacMartin (nee Morgan) (1815–1903) (mother)

Daniel George MacMartin (9 January 1844 – 12 April 1923 (aged 79)) was treaty commissioner for the Government of Ontario for Treaty 9 in 1905 and 1906, along with two Dominion commissioners, Duncan Campbell Scott, of Ottawa, Ontario, Esquire, and Samuel Stewart, of Ottawa, Ontario, Esquire. MacMartin was the sole commissioner nominated by and representing the province of Ontario under provisions which reads: "That any future treaties with the Indians in respect of territory in Ontario to which they have not before the passing of the said Statutes surrendered their claim aforesaid shall be deemed to require the concurrence of the government of Ontario."

Under the provisions of this clause, the terms of the treaty were fixed by the governments of the Dominion and Ontario; Daniel G. MacMartin and the two other commissioners "were empowered to offer certain conditions, but were not allowed to alter or add to them in the event of their not being acceptable to the First Nations." MacMartin's role was to protect the interests of the Ontario government whose agreement to make the treaty had to be sought and in whose jurisdiction reserves will be chosen and surveyed. MacMartin was to ensure that no reserves were located in areas with water power or mineral resources with future potential.

MacMartin's incomplete 1905 journal was donated to the Queen's University archives in 1968. Although the journal was accessed by other researchers its significance was not fully recognised until c. 2010. Until the contents of diaries were revealed, details about the signing of the constitutionally recognized agreement were known only through the accounts of Duncan Campbell Scott and Samuel Stewart, commissioners appointed by the Government of Canada. The journals of the other two – Samuel Stewart and Duncan Campbell Scott, both former employees of the Department of Indian Affairs, were easily accessible at the National Archives of Canada in Ottawa.

MacMartin's diaries provide another perspective on the Treaty 9 tracing the treaty's origins, negotiation, explanation, interpretation, signing, implementation, and recent commemoration.

He was a miner from Perth, Ontario and was considered to be an Indian Affairs outsider, albeit someone who was politically well-connected. It was suggested that he probably knew little about the process of treaty negotiations; however, from his journal entries, he seemed to realize that Treaty 9 was an anomaly. He had received the written Treaty prior to negotiations and realized that he had only fixed terms to offer and no authority to bargain.

Toronto lawyer Murray Klippenstein, who earlier helped the Mushkegowuk First Nations of western James Bay to challenge the Mike Harris government's workfare legislation and launch their Rupert's Land Protection Pledge suit, also discovered the journal. Klippenstein claimed that in MacMartin's diaries oral promises had been made that contradicted the written Treaties and supports Elders' claims. He quoted from Commissioner MacMartin's diary, "it was explained to them that they could hunt and fish as of old" and "they were not restricted as of territory" and "they could hunt wherever they pleased." Klippenstein argued that oral promises that are part of the Treaty should override legislation like the Far North Act.
