= Treaty 9 =

Treaty between First Nations and Canadian Crown

The James Bay Treaty (Treaty No. 9)
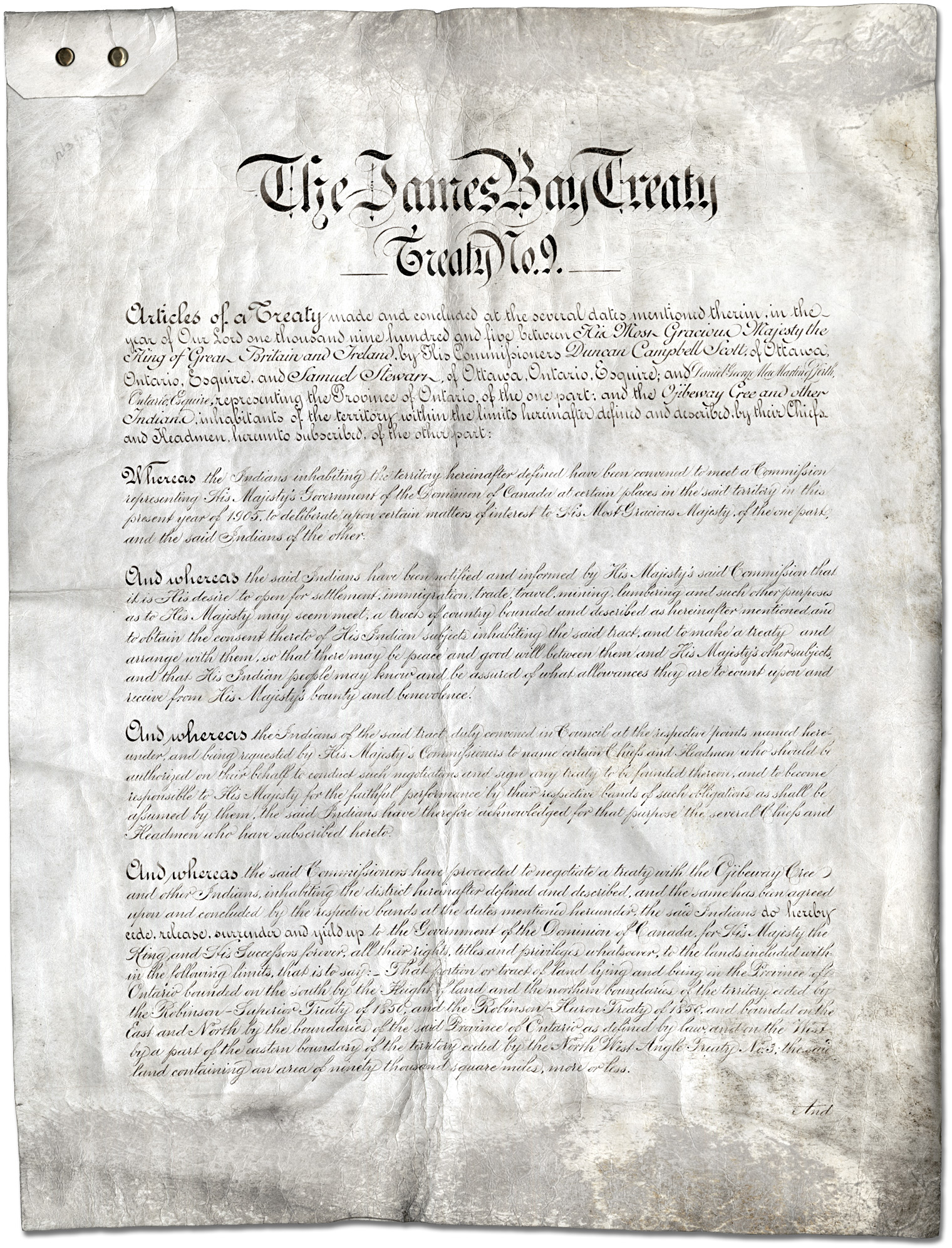
- The first page of the written document of The James Bay Treaty (Treaty No. 9).
- Signed: 12 July 1905 – 28 July 1930
- Parties: Canada (on behalf of Canadian Crown); Ontario; § List of the Treaty 9 First Nations
- Language: English

Treaty No. 9 (also known as The James Bay Treaty) is a numbered treaty first signed in 1905–1906 between Anishinaabe (Algonquin and Ojibwe) and Omushkegowuk Cree communities and the Canadian Crown, which includes both the government of Canada and the government of the province of Ontario. It is commonly known as the "James Bay Treaty," since the eastern edge of the treaty territory is the shore of James Bay in Northern Ontario.

By the early 1900s, both federal and provincial governments were interested in taking control of lands around the Hudson and James Bay watersheds in northern Ontario, traditionally home to Cree, Oji-Cree, and Ojibwe peoples.

After nearly a year of delay from Ontario, in May 1905, both governments began negotiating the terms of the treaty's written document. Although ratification of the treaty required the agreement of Indigenous peoples living in the territory, none of the Omushkegowuk and the Anishinaabe communities expected to sign were involved in creating the terms of the written document, nor were the terms permitted to change during the treaty expedition.

One First Nations community in the bordering Abitibi region of northwestern Quebec is included in this treaty. Further adhesions involving Ojibwe and Swampy Cree communities were signed in 1929 and 1937.

== Timeline ==
- 29 June 1905: Duncan C. Scott and Samuel Stewart are appointed as treaty commissioners by the Government of Canada. Daniel G. MacMartin is appointed as commissioner by the province of Ontario. They would jointly conduct signing ceremonies with First Nations communities on a set route through the proposed treaty territory.
- 3 July 1905: Agreement between province of Ontario and the federal Canadian government in support of Treaty 9.
- 12 July 1905: Osnaburgh (Mishkeegogamang First Nation) signing
- 19 July 1905: Fort Hope (Eabametoong First Nation) signing
- 25 July 1905: Marten Falls (Marten Falls First Nation) signing
- 3 August 1905: Fort Albany (Fort Albany First Nation) signing
- 9 August 1905: Moose Factory signing
- 21 August 1905: New Post (Taykwa Tagamou Nation) signing
- 7 June 1906: Abitibi (Wahgoshig First Nation) signing
- 20 June 1906: Matachewan signing
- 7 July 1906: Mattagami (Mattagami First Nation) signing
- 16 July 1906: Flying Post (Flying Post First Nation) signing
- 19 July 1906: Fort Hope (Eabametoong First Nation) signing
- 25 July 1906: Brunswick House (Brunswick House First Nation) signing
- 9 August 1906: Long Lake (Long Lake 58 First Nation) signing
- 5 July 1929: Big Trout Lake (Kitchenuhmaykoosib Inninuwug First Nation) signing
- 18 July 1930: Windigo River signing
- 25 July 1930: Fort Severn (Fort Severn First Nation) signing
- 28 July 1930: Winisk (Weenusk First Nation) signing
- 1995: Diaries kept by Daniel G. MacMartin, treaty commissioner for the Government of Ontario when the agreement was signed in 1905, are discovered as mislabelled by researchers at Queen's University Archives.

== List of the Treaty 9 First Nations ==
Osnaburgh signing

- Osnaburgh Band of Ojibway (historical)
  - Cat Lake First Nation
  - Mishkeegogamang First Nation (formerly known as New Osnaburgh First Nation)
  - Slate Falls First Nation

First Fort Hope signing

- Fort Hope Band of Oj-Cree (historical)
  - Eabametoong First Nation (also known as Fort Hope First Nation)
  - Neskantaga First Nation (also known as Lansdowne House First Nation)
  - Nibinamik First Nation (also known as Summer Beaver First Nation)
  - Webequie First Nation

Marten Falls signing

- Marten Falls First Nation (formerly Marten Falls Band of Oji-Cree)
- Constance Lake First Nation (formerly English River Band of Oji-Cree)

Fort Albany signing

- Fort Albany First Nation (formerly Fort Albany Band of Cree)

Moose Factory signing

- Moose Cree First Nation (formerly Moose Factory Band of Cree)

New Post signing

- Taykwa Tagamou Nation (formerly New Post Band of Cree)

Abitibi signing

- Abitibi Indians (historical)
  - Abitibiwinni First Nation (formerly Abitibi-Dominion Band of Abitibi Indians)
  - Wahgoshig First Nation (formerly Abitibi-Ontario Band of Abitibi Indians)

Matachewan signing

- Matachewan First Nation (formerly Matchewan Indians)

Mattagami signing

- Mattagami First Nation (formerly Mattagami Indians)

Flying Post signing

- Flying Post First Nation (formerly Flying Post Indians)

Second Fort Hope signing

- Chapleau Ojibway First Nation (formerly Chapleau Band of Ojibway)
- Chapleau Cree First Nation (formerly Chapleau Community of Moose Factory Band of Cree)

New Brunswick House signing

- Brunswick House First Nation (formerly New Brunswick House Band of Ojibway)

Long Lake signing

- Ginoogaming First Nation (formerly Long Lake Band of Ojibway)

Big Trout Lake signing

- Big Trout Lake Band of Oji-cree (historical)
  - Bearskin Lake First Nation
  - Kasabonika Lake First Nation
  - Kingfisher First Nation
  - Kitchenuhmaykoosib Inninuwug First Nation
  - Muskrat Dam Lake First Nation
  - Sachigo Lake First Nation
  - Wapekeka First Nation
  - Wawakapewin First Nation
  - Wunnumin Lake First Nation

Windigo River signing

- Caribou Lake Band of Oji-cree (historical)
  - McDowell Lake First Nation
  - North Caribou Lake First Nation
- Deer Lake Band of Oji-cree (historical)
  - Keewaywin First Nation

Fort Severn signing

- Fort Severn First Nation

Winisk signing

- Weenusk First Nation (formerly Winisk Band of Cree)
- Attawapiskat First Nation (formerly Attawapiskat Band of Cree)

Later Adhesions

- Aroland First Nation
- Missanabie Cree First Nation

== Treaty 9 challenge ==
The personal diaries of Daniel G. MacMartin, treaty commissioner for the Government of Ontario, written more than 100 years ago but rediscovered by historians at Queen's University Archives, supported oral histories passed down by Indigenous Elders that the agreements spoken by commissioners at the treaty signings did not reflect the written document. The unearthing of this additional primary source evidence triggered a legal challenge for mining access on First Nations land. MacMartin's diary suggested "First Nation leaders may have been misled by government negotiators as they were signing Treaty No. 9, says Murray Klippenstein, legal representative for Mushkegowuk Council."

== Documentary film ==
The James Bay Treaty is the subject of a 2014 documentary film by Alanis Obomsawin, entitled Trick or Treaty?

== See also ==
- Nishnawbe Aski Nation
- Numbered Treaties
- Mushkegowuk Council
- The Canadian Crown and Indigenous peoples of Canada
