= Beaverhouse First Nation =

Indigenous first nation near Kirkland Lake

Beaverhouse First Nation is an Indigenous first nation located on the banks Kirkland Lake in the Misema River system.

After initially being excluded from the Treaty 9 agreement between Indigenous nations and Canada, the government of Canada officially recognized Beaverhouse First Nation in April 2022.

== Nomenclature ==
The name comes from the Algonquin name of the Misema River Maaseema Qweesh whereby Queesh means the home of a beaver.

== Location ==
Beaverhouse First Nation is located on a peninsula the banks Kirkland Lake in the Misema River system and lacks easy road access. Access is usually done by boat in the summer season and by snowmobile in the winter.

== History ==
Beaverhouse First Nation was excluded from the Treaty 9 agreement between other Indigenous nations and Canada, resulting in it being designated a "non-status" first nation, until 2022 Historically, much of the land around where Beaverhouse First Nation people live was claimed by Timiskaming First Nation.

Beaverhouse First Nation is a member of the Wabun Tribal Council.

In May 2016, Chief Brown Martel criticized government minister David Zimmer for what she described as a failure of the Canadian government to provide land to the nation.

In 2018, Beaverhouse First Nation Community submitted a claim to the Government of Ontario, asserting that it is a distinct First Nation and did not sign Treaty 9, or any other treaty. The claim was supported by the Nishnawbe-Aski Nation regional association and the Wabun Tribal Council. In April 2019, the government advised the nation that it will complete an assessment of the claim submission. The Government of Canada officially recognized Beaverhouse as a First Nation as defined by Section 35 of the Constitution Act, 1982 in April 2022.

== Leadership ==
Roy Meaniss was the chief in the 1980s, followed by Gloria McKenzie.

Marcia Brown Martel (later known as Sally Susan Mathias-Martel) became the chief in 2011 until at least 2018 and from 2021 the chief has been Wayne Wabie.

== Demographics ==
The population was about 285 in 2017.

== See also ==
- Kirkland Lake (town)
- McGarry, Ontario
- Teme-Augama Anishnabai
