= Neskantaga First Nation =

Neskantaga
- Indian reserve
- Neskantaga Indian Reserve
- Location within Ontario
- Coordinates: 52°12′N 88°02′W
- Country: Canada
- Province: Ontario
- District: Kenora
- First Nation: Neskantaga

Area
  - Land: 8.31 km^{2} (3.21 sq mi)

Population (2021)
  - Total: 244
- Website: neskantaga.com

Neskantaga First Nation (formerly known as Lansdowne House Indian Band) is a remote Ojibwe First Nation band government in the northern reaches of the Canadian province of Ontario, situated along the shore of Attawapiskat Lake in the District of Kenora.

The First Nation is a signatory to Treaty 9 (originally as part of the Fort Hope Band) and has reserved for itself the 831.50 hectares (2,054.7 acres) Neskantaga Indian reserve, containing the main community of Lansdowne House Indian Settlement on Attawapiskat Lake, on the west side of the lake, which is currently the community's water source. Associated with the Neskantaga First Nation is the Summer Beaver Indian Settlement, which is shared with Nibinamik First Nation. The Lansdowne House is linked to the rest of Ontario by the Lansdowne House Airport, and by winter roads and ice roads to points south, via the Northern Ontario Resource Trail. As of November 2011, there is a total registered population of 414 people, of whom 304 people live on their own reserve.

Neskantaga is a fly-in community and is therefore not accessible by year-round road.

== Governance ==
The First Nation elects its officials under the Custom Electoral System. The most recent officials were Gary Quisses as Chief, and Bill Mequanawap, Christopher Moonias, Kelvin Moonias and William Moonias as Councillors; their two-year term ended on 03/31/2013.

The First Nation's council is a member of the Matawa First Nations, a local Chiefs Council, and of Nishnawbe Aski Nation, a Tribal Political Organisation representing most of the First Nations in northern Ontario.

== Location ==
The Neskantaga First Nations is about 450 kilometres north of Thunder Bay, Ontario. Neskantaga is at the headwaters of the Attawapiskat River in the James Bay Lowlands, in a "pristine boreal setting known for bears, wolverines and excellent fishing" with many bodies of water and a "landscape weaving among them". The community was relocated in the late 1980s to a peninsula known as on Grandmother's Point, on the west side of Attawapiskat Lake.

== History ==
According to their website, the "ancient Anishnawbe communities [date] back to at least 3000 BC." The "Attawapiskat and Otoskwin rivers surrounding Neskantaga merge into a delta with significant brackish tidal marshes" and the area was once "part of a major trade route". There were fur-trading sites since the early 1880s in the area.

Until the 1980s, the community members had lived for many years in log cabins in Lansdowne House where the Indian Affairs agency had a cabin. For many years they fetched their water from the agency's cabin as it was the only building to have plumbing. Because of ongoing issues with both infrastructure and flooding, the community was relocated in the 1980s to its current site, which is about a 20 km from its previous location. A 2020 CBC article described how the community members had given up their cabins, which were then demolished "for the promise of a better life at a new location with improved services, including clean running water in each house."

== Ring of Fire ==
The Neskantaga First Nation is one of three First Nations that are impacted by the Northern Ontario Ring of Fire, along with the Marten Falls First Nation, and the Webequie First Nation. An open pit mine proposed by Cliffs is on treaty nine territory, of which the Webequie First Nation is located closest to.

On February 7, 2009, Ontario Minister Rick Bartolucci released the White Paper regarding the Northern Ontario Ring of Fire, including the announcement of decisions made regarding Cliffs and the province that would negatively impact Treaty 9 land. According to the Neskantaga First Nation, the agreements with Cliffs about Treaty 9 lands, was a "blatant and illegal attempt by Ontario to expand its own influence and jurisdiction in Treaty No. 9. "Ontario has twice pushed back the deadline for input" in Ring of Fire planning, but the community says it has not enough time.

By December 2020, there were tensions between the Ontario government, Neskantaga First Nation, and the nearby Webequie First Nation. The Webequie First Nation was leading an "environmental assessment process for a supply road leading to the Ring of Fire mining region" but the Neskantaga First Nation raised concerns about their own lack of meaningful participation in the assessment process during the COVID-19 pandemic. The participation of the Neskantaga First Nation was further complicated by a forced evacuation in October 2020 caused by the community's "precarious water supply."

On April 5, 2021, the Attawapiskat, Fort Albany, and Neskantaga First Nations declared a moratorium on Ring of Fire development.

== Long-term drinking water advisories (DWA) ==
The water source for the Neskantaga community is Attawapiskat Lake. The lake often has a "naturally occurring “colour” from the roots of trees, plants and other organic matter" and has to be filtered before it can be used as drinking water.

As of June 2021, the Neskantaga First Nation was still under a Long-term Drinking Water Advisory, which was first put in place in 1995. The 300 community members rely on the community’s Reverse osmosis (RO) machine for water. It is a "laborious process" in which individual households have to haul sleds several times a week to and from the local hotel to use the unreliable machine. They also depend on shipments of bottled water.

The DWA is the longest in Canada and it began to gain national attention when Canadian news outlets began to cover the story from 2004 to 2016 about the unsafe water supply. In 2006, the 2005 government plan to modernize water supplies was cancelled following a change of government.

East of Neskantaga and 90 kilometres (56 mi) west of Attawapiskat First Nation, in the Northern Ontario Ring of Fire, in the James Bay Lowlands, De Beers' Victor Diamond Mine—which was operational from 2009 until 2020 when it was decommissioned—had provided "clean water for hundreds of workers" on its open pit mining site. To community members, this is evidence that the inability to provide drinking water is not a technical but a political issue.

In 1993, the federal Indian Affairs department "paid for the construction of a natural sand, low-filter water treatment plant" to filter the water from Lake Neskantaga. By February 1, 1995, it was evident that the water treatment plant had not been "built properly", and was not adequately disinfecting the water. The community was placed under a "boil water advisory" which has remained in place ever since.

In 2016, then-Indigenous Affairs Minister Carolyn Bennett visited Neskantaga, which at that time had a population of 350, and announced that the federal government would "invest approximately $8.8 million to help upgrade the community's water treatment system, including an addition to the existing water plant with new treatment technology and additional reservoir storage capacity to meet the community's long-term needs."

In October 2020, the Neskantaga First Nation fully evacuated the reserve after test results showed high levels of hydrocarbons in the water supply, caused by a faulty pump installed by Razar Contracting Services. On December 21, 2020, over 250 members returned to the reserve.

By December 2020, the new water treatment plant was commissioned and by March 2021, the upgrade and expansion was approaching final completion. There were 374 people living on the reserve and the boil water advisory affected "76 households and 6 community buildings."

== Climate ==
Neskantaga First Nation has a humid continental climate (Dfb). Summers consist of mild, sometimes warm days with cool nights and rain usually falling on a little more than half of all summer days. Winters are brutally cold with nights reaching dangerously cold temperatures and annual snowfall averaging 95.1 inches, (241.6 cm) falling on 89 separate days. Winter usually begins sometime during October and can easily last well into April.

Climate data for Neskantaga First Nation (1991−2020, extremes 1941–present (Note: Long term records have been recorded at various climate stations in or nearby Neskantaga First Nation since 1941))
Month	Jan	Feb	Mar	Apr	May	Jun	Jul	Aug	Sep	Oct	Nov	Dec	Year
Record high humidex	4.8	9.9	24.7	27.3	44.5	43.2	44.5	40.7	38.3	29.8	20.4	7.3	44.5
Record high °C (°F)	5.4 (41.7)	9.9 (49.8)	22.4 (72.3)	27.9 (82.2)	33.8 (92.8)	38.5 (101.3)	36.7 (98.1)	35.0 (95.0)	30.7 (87.3)	26.2 (79.2)	20.5 (68.9)	7.4 (45.3)	38.5 (101.3)
Mean daily maximum °C (°F)	−14.9 (5.2)	−11.6 (11.1)	−3.4 (25.9)	5.0 (41.0)	13.5 (56.3)	20.1 (68.2)	23.0 (73.4)	21.3 (70.3)	15.7 (60.3)	6.5 (43.7)	−3.0 (26.6)	−11.4 (11.5)	5.1 (41.2)
Daily mean °C (°F)	−20.6 (−5.1)	−18.8 (−1.8)	−11.3 (11.7)	−1.8 (28.8)	7.0 (44.6)	13.9 (57.0)	17.0 (62.6)	15.6 (60.1)	10.5 (50.9)	2.7 (36.9)	−6.9 (19.6)	−16.2 (2.8)	−0.7 (30.7)
Mean daily minimum °C (°F)	−26.1 (−15.0)	−25.9 (−14.6)	−19.0 (−2.2)	−8.5 (16.7)	0.5 (32.9)	7.7 (45.9)	11.0 (51.8)	9.8 (49.6)	5.1 (41.2)	−1.1 (30.0)	−10.9 (12.4)	−21.2 (−6.2)	−6.6 (20.1)
Record low °C (°F)	−47.8 (−54.0)	−45.6 (−50.1)	−42.8 (−45.0)	−32.8 (−27.0)	−17.2 (1.0)	−5.3 (22.5)	−0.1 (31.8)	−0.9 (30.4)	−7.2 (19.0)	−16.9 (1.6)	−34.0 (−29.2)	−45.8 (−50.4)	−47.8 (−54.0)
Record low wind chill	−62.5	−58.3	−50.9	−41.3	−26.8	−8.0	−4.4	−1.8	−15.5	−22.5	−44.2	−54	−62.5
Average precipitation mm (inches)	26.6 (1.05)	21.8 (0.86)	31.6 (1.24)	41.9 (1.65)	50.7 (2.00)	80.8 (3.18)	107.5 (4.23)	102.7 (4.04)	92.6 (3.65)	56.6 (2.23)	54.8 (2.16)	32.1 (1.26)	699.5 (27.54)
Average rainfall mm (inches)	0.0 (0.0)	0.2 (0.01)	3.3 (0.13)	19.9 (0.78)	43.3 (1.70)	79.3 (3.12)	107.5 (4.23)	102.7 (4.04)	88.8 (3.50)	34.1 (1.34)	8.6 (0.34)	1.0 (0.04)	488.7 (19.24)
Average snowfall cm (inches)	31.3 (12.3)	26.5 (10.4)	33.0 (13.0)	24.2 (9.5)	8.0 (3.1)	1.6 (0.6)	0.0 (0.0)	0.0 (0.0)	3.9 (1.5)	24.0 (9.4)	51.2 (20.2)	38.0 (15.0)	241.6 (95.1)
Average precipitation days (≥ 0.2 mm)	13.0	11.6	11.2	9.5	11.8	15.0	16.0	15.8	17.7	15.8	15.9	15.5	168.9
Average rainy days (≥ 0.2 mm)	0.0	0.21	1.5	4.2	10.1	14.9	16.0	15.8	16.9	9.7	2.2	0.28	91.8
Average snowy days (≥ 0.2 cm)	13.3	11.9	10.6	6.8	3.2	0.53	0.0	0.0	1.8	9.3	15.2	16.2	88.7
Average relative humidity (%) (at 15:00 LST)	73.7	63.2	53.8	47.8	50.4	53.8	56.5	60.1	65.2	71.0	78.7	79.3	62.8
Source: Environment Canada (precipitation/rainfall/snowfall 1971–2000)
