= Mattagami First Nation =

First Nation reserve in Ontario, Canada

Mattagami 71
- Indian reserve
- Mattagami Indian Reserve No. 71
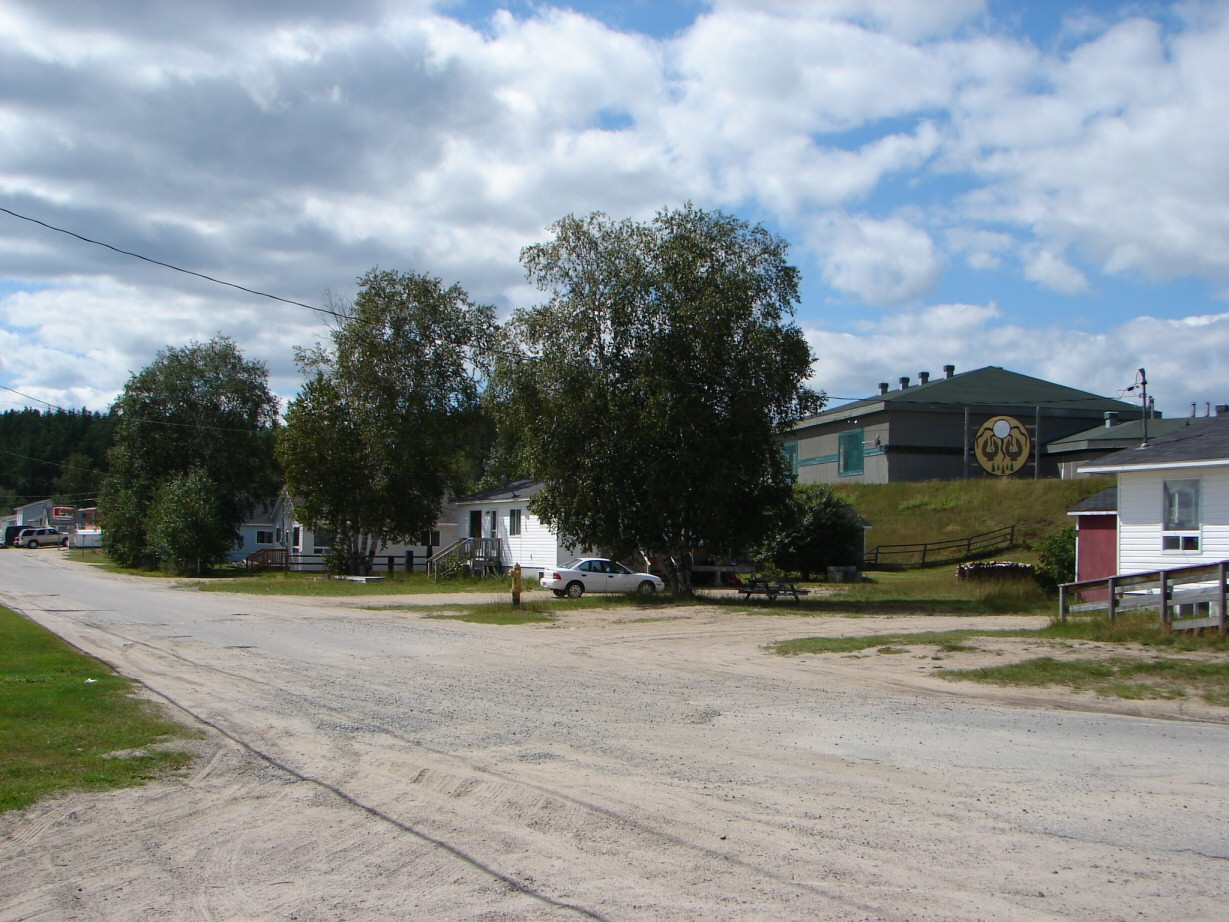

- Location within Ontario
- Coordinates: 47°48′N 81°31′W
- Country: Canada
- Province: Ontario
- District: Sudbury
- First Nation: Mattagami

Area
  - Land: 45.93 km^{2} (17.73 sq mi)

Population (2011)
  - Total: 193
  - Density: 4.2/km^{2} (11/sq mi)
- Website: mattagami.com

Mattagami First Nation is an Anishnaabe First Nation band government - mainly Ojibwe, Anisininew and some Odawa - in the Canadian province of Ontario situated along the Mattagami River. The First Nation members of the community primarily live on the Mattagami 71 reserve in the Sudbury District near Gogama. The on-reserve population is approximately 200 residents.

Mattagami First Nation is part of the Wabun Tribal Council, a political organization which is also part of the Nishnawbe Aski Nation (NAN), representing the Treaty 9 area. The current chief of the Mattagami First Nation is Jennifer Constant.

The reserve has its own elementary school, while high school students have the option to attend Keewaytinook Internet High school in the community or they are bused to Timmins.

== See also ==
- List of francophone communities in Ontario
