= Anisininew =

First Nation in Ontario and Manitoba

Anishinini
- Distribution of Anishinaabe peoples; the Oji-Cree are depicted by the orange band.

Regions with significant populations
- Canada (Ontario, Manitoba)

Languages
- Oji-Cree, English

Related ethnic groups
- Cree, Ojibwe and other Anishinaabe

- Person: Anihshininii ᐊᓂᐦᔑᓂᓃ
- People: Anihshininiiwag ᐊᓂᐦᔑᓂᓃᐗᐠ
- Language: Anihshininiimowin ᐊᓂᐦᔑᓂᓃᒧᐏᐣ; Hand Talk

The Anisininew or Oji-Cree are a First Nation in the Canadian provinces of Ontario and Manitoba, residing in a band extending from the Missinaibi River region in Northeastern Ontario at the east to Lake Winnipeg at the west.

The Anisininew people are descended from historical intermarriage between the Ojibwa and Cree cultures, but constitute a distinct nation. They are considered one of the component groups of Anishinaabe, and reside primarily in a transitional zone between traditional Ojibwa lands to their south and traditional Cree lands to their north. Historically, the Oji-Cree were identified by the British and Canadian governments as "Cree." The Oji-Cree have identified with the Cree (or more specifically, the Swampy Cree) and not with the Ojibwa located to the south of them. Traditionally, they were called Noopiming-ininiwag (People in the Woods) by the Ojibwe. Oji-Cree at Round Lake First Nation were known as Ajijaakoons (little cranes), due to their chief's name, Ajijaak. Many Oji-Cree identify by the autonym Anishinaabe or Anishinini (Original Human).

In 2024, 22 different First Nations governments from both Manitoba and Ontario officially adopted the name Anisininew to replace the term "Oji-Cree." In their declaration, they likened the division of the Anisininew nation across provincial boundaries to the building of the Berlin Wall.

In 2019, several Anisininew communities banded together in a Declaration of Sovereignty, establishing the offices of a cross-community Grand Chief and Grand Council and formally enshrining a commitment to the traditional teachings and traditional laws of the Anisininew people. This declaration was signed by the chiefs and councils of Garden Hill First Nation, Red Sucker Lake First Nation, St. Theresa Point First Nation, and Wasagamack First Nation as well as representatives from Crown–Indigenous Relations and the Treaty Relations Commission of Manitoba.

Anishininimowin (the Oji-Cree language) is more closely related to Ojibwa structurally, although its literary tradition more closely resembles that of Cree. Anishininimowin has about 15,210 speakers according to the 2021 census. Ontario Member of the Provincial Parliament Sol Mamakwa, elected in 2018, has used greetings and short phrases in Anishininimowin in the Legislative Assembly of Ontario; in 2024, after changes to the standing orders and interpretation services, he gave a ten-minute speech and asking the first question in Question Period in Anishininimowin, becoming the first person to officially address the legislature in an Indigenous language and in a language other than English or French.

Today, Anishininimowin is used in online learning and through community radio broadcasting.

== Anisininew bands ==
- Severn River Cree (historical)
  - Big Trout Lake Band of Cree (historical)
    - Bearskin Lake First Nation – Bearskin Lake Reserve
    - Kitchenuhmaykoosib Inninuwug First Nation – Kitchenuhmaykoosib Aaki 84 Reserve
    - Muskrat Dam Lake First Nation – Muskrat Dam Lake Reserve
    - Sachigo Lake First Nation – Sachigo Lake 1 Reserve, Sachigo Lake 2 Reserve, Sachigo Lake 3 Reserve
  - Deer Lake Band of Cree (historical)
    - Deer Lake First Nation – Deer Lake Reserve
    - Keewaywin First Nation – Kee-Way-Win Indian Settlement, Keewaywin Reserve
    - Koocheching First Nation –
    - McDowell Lake First Nation – MacDowell Lake Indian Settlement
    - North Spirit Lake First Nation – North Spirit Lake Reserve
    - Sandy Lake First Nation – Sandy Lake 88 Reserve
  - Island Lake Band of Cree (historical)
    - Garden Hill First Nation – Garden Hill First Nation Reserve, Amik Wachink Sakahikan Indian Reserve, Wesha Kijay Wasagamach Indian Reserve, Seeseep Sakahikan Indian Reserve, Pe-ta-waygamak Indian Reserve
    - Red Sucker Lake First Nation – Red Sucker Lake 1976 Reserve
    - St. Theresa Point First Nation – St. Theresa Point Indian Reserve, Mukwa Narrows Indian Reserve, Cantin Lake Indian Reserve
    - Wasagamack First Nation – Wasagamack Indian Reserve, Feather Rapids Indian Reserve, Naytawunkank Indian Reserve
- Upland Ojibway (historical)
  - Osnaburgh House Band of Ojibway (historical)
    - Cat Lake First Nation – Cat Lake 63C Reserve
    - Mishkeegogamang First Nation (formerly known as New Osnaburgh House Band of Ojibway) – Osnaburgh 63A Reserve, Osnaburgh 63B Reserve
    - Slate Falls First Nation – Slate Falls Indian Settlement
    - Ojibway Nation of Saugeen First Nation – Ojibway Nation of Saugeen Reserve
  - Fort Hope Band of Ojibway or Cree (historical)
    - Aroland First Nation – Aroland Indian Settlement
    - Constance Lake First Nation –
    - Eabametoong First Nation (also known as Fort Hope First Nation) – Fort Hope 64 Reserve
    - Marten Falls First Nation – Marten Falls 65 Reserve
    - Neskantaga First Nation (formerly Lansdowne House First Nation) – Summer Beaver Settlement, Neskantaga Reserve
    - Nibinamik First Nation (also known as Summer Beaver First Nation – Summer Beaver Settlement
    - Whitewater First Nation –
- Winisk River Cree (historical)
  - Caribou Lake Band of Cree (Historical)
    - Kasabonika Lake First Nation (ᑳᓭᐹᓇᐦᑳ ᓂᐢᑕᒼ ᐊᓂᐦᓯᓂᓂᐗᐠ (Gaa-zebaanikaa Nistam Anisininiwag); unpointed: ᑲᓭᐸᓂᑲ ᓂᐢᑕᒼ ᐊᓂᓯᓂᓂᐗᐠ) – Kasabonika Lake Reserve
    - Kingfisher First Nation – Kingfisher Lake 1 Reserve, Kingfisher 2A Reserve, Kingfisher 3A Reserve
    - North Caribou Lake First Nation (also known as Weagamow Lake First Nation or Round Lake First Nation) – Weagamow Lake Indian Reserve 87
    - Wapekeka First Nation (formerly Angling Lake First Nation) – Wapekeka Reserve 1, Wapekeka Reserve 2
    - Wawakapewin First Nation (ᐙᐙᑲᐯᐎᐣ ᓂᐢᑕᒼ ᐊᓂᐦᔑᓂᓂᐗᐠ (Waawaagabewin Nistam Anishininiwag); unpointed: ᐗᐗᑲᐯᐎᐣ ᓂᐢᑕᒼ ᐊᓂᔑᓂᓂᐗᐠ) (formerly Nemeigusabins Lake Band, Long Dog Lake Band or Long Dog Band) – Wawakapewin Indian Reserve
    - Webequie First Nation – Webiqui Indian Settlement, Webequi Indian Reserve
    - Wunnumin Lake First Nation – Wunnumin 1 Reserve, Wunnumin 2 Reserve
