= Matachewan First Nation =

Matachewan 72
- Indian reserve
- Matachewan Indian Reserve No. 72
- Location within Ontario
- Coordinates: 48°04′N 80°38′W
- Country: Canada
- Province: Ontario
- District: Timiskaming
- First Nation: Matachewan

Area
  - Land: 33.63 km^{2} (12.98 sq mi)

Population (2011)
  - Total: 83
  - Density: 2.5/km^{2} (6.5/sq mi)
- Website: www.matachewan firstnation.com

Matachewan First Nation is an Ojibway First Nation reserve located in the Timiskaming District of Ontario, Canada. The First Nations people of the Matachewan area signed onto Treaty 9 in 1905. As of August, 2024, they had a total registered population of 1037 people, of which 50 people live on their own reserve.

== Governance ==
The Nation is governed by the Act Electoral System, in which a Chief and nine Councillors are elected for a two-year term.

They are a signatory to Treaty 9, the First Nation is member of Wabun Tribal Council, a non-political Regional Chiefs Council as well as Nishnawbe Aski Nation, a Tribal Political Organisation representing most all of the First Nations in northern Ontario.

== Reserves ==
Matachewan First Nation have reserved for themselves one reserve:

- 6,158.60 hectares (15,218.2 acres) Matachewan 72

== See also ==
- List of francophone communities in Ontario
