= Abitibiwinni First Nation =

First Nation in Quebec, Canada

The Abitibiwinni First Nation (French: Première Nation Abitibiwinni) is an Algonquian First Nation in the Canadian province of Quebec, residing primarily in the community of Pikogan in the Abitibi-Témiscamingue region.

The First Nation has a total population of 916 listed in the Indian and Northern Affairs Canada's 2009 Indian Registry, of whom 597 live in Pikogan and 319 live off-reserve. Hip hop musician Samian is one of the most noted members of the nation.
