= Long Lake 58 First Nation =

Long Lake 58
- Indian reserve
- Long Lake Indian Reserve No. 58
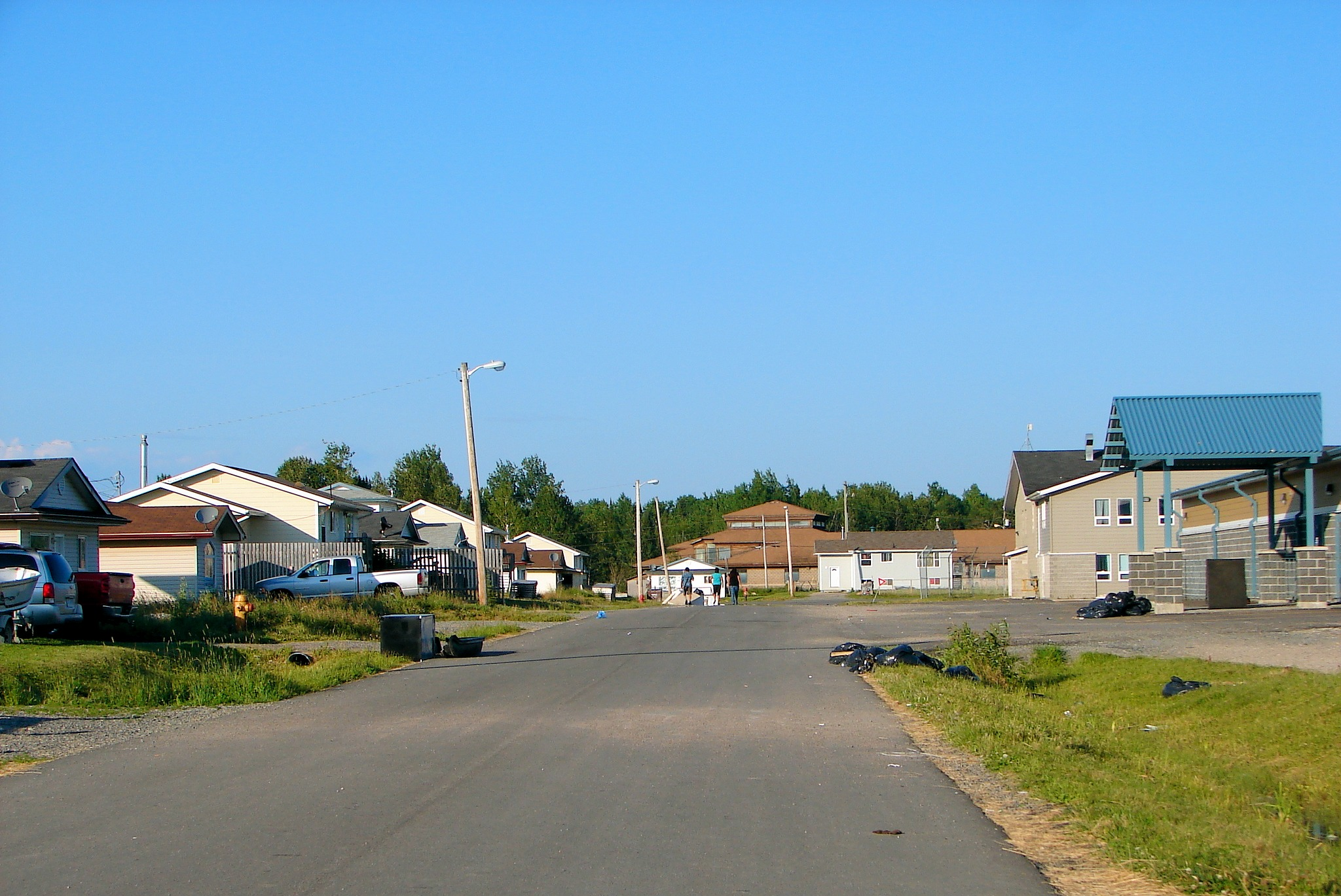

- Location within Ontario
- Coordinates: 49°48′N 86°34′W
- Country: Canada
- Province: Ontario
- District: Thunder Bay
- First Nation: Long Lake 58

Government
  - Chief: John C. Hector

Area
  - Land: 2.75 km^{2} (1.06 sq mi)

Population (2021)
  - Total: 410
  - Density: 149/km^{2} (390/sq mi)
- Website: www.longlake58fn.ca

Long Lake 58 First Nation (Ojibwe: Ginoogamaa-zaaga’igan 58) is an Anishinaabe (Ojibway) First Nation band government located in Northern Ontario, located approximately 40 km east of Geraldton, Ontario, Canada, on the northern shore of Long Lake, immediately north of Ginoogaming First Nation and west of the community of Longlac, Ontario. As of January, 2008, their total registered population was 1,248 people, of which their on-Reserve population was 427.

== History ==
=== Aboriginal title ===
Long Lake 58 First Nation's traditional territory, on the northern shore of Long Lake, is within the James Bay drainage basin, which places it within the geographic extent of Treaty 9. However, the governments of Canada and Ontario hold that the band's aboriginal title was ceded to the Crown in the 1850 Robinson Superior Treaty, despite that treaty covering lands that drained into Lake Superior, not James Bay. The First Nation that they never signed any treaty, and never ceded their aboriginal title to their traditional lands.

=== Reserve and grievances ===
In the late 19th century, reserves were created for bands north of Lake Superior which had not been present at the negotiation of the Robinson Superior Treaty. These reserves, including the 537-acre Long Lake 58, were significantly smaller than the reserves received by bands that had signed the treaty.

In the late 1930s, the government of Ontario dammed Long Lake in order to float logs to Terrace Bay, Lake Superior. After WWII, the Kimberly-Clark Corporation took over logging in the area. The corporation contaminated the lake with wood bark and toxic PCBs, so by the 1980s it was dangerous to eat fish from the lake.

Formerly abundant game have been reduced in numbers and health as a result of clear-cut logging and herbicide spraying by the Ontario Ministry of Natural Resources and Kimberly-Clark. According to band members, their trapping lodges full of equipment and supplies were burned by the Ministry of Natural Resources.

In 1979, Chief George Finlayson travelled to London with other First Nations chiefs to lobby against patriation of the Canadian constitution, because "many Indian leaders feared... that non-Natives could not be counted on to respect old promises made by the British sovereign once the federal and provincial governments were extended the authority to amend the Canadian constitution domestically."

In the early 1980s, the population of the band was about 650, but since Bill C-31 was passed in 1985, approximately 150 new members had been added to the band list by 1990, bringing the total membership to around 800.

According to elder Rayno Fisher, the rail lines and highway passing through the reserve were constructed without permission from the band.

=== Railway blockade ===
On August 9, 1990, members of the band blocked Highway 11 on the reserve for one hour, in order to bring attention to the fact that the province of Ontario had assumed ownership of their traditional territory despite it never having been ceded to Canada. After the highway blockade was lifted, Rayno Fisher suggested that they blockade the railway, saying "We wouldn't be trespassing CNR. CNR has been trespassing us for the last 75 years."

From August 13 to 17, Long Lake 58 band members blocked the Canadian National Railway line running through their reserve, in concert with Netmizaaggamig Nishnaabeg (Pic Mobert) blocking the Canadian Pacific Railway route to the south.

=== Recent development ===
In 1998, the First Nation built an elementary school and high school on the reserve.

In the summer of 2017, two people in the community died by suicide and nine others were hospitalized after suicide attempts.

On November 24, 2017, the members of Long Lake 58 ratified a land code under the First Nations Land Management Act, by a vote of 368 yes to 14 no votes. The code defines procedures for use and occupation of reserve lands and gives the Chief and Council control over zoning, by-laws, dispute resolution, etc.

In 2018, the First Nation's leadership and Greenstone Gold Mines made an agreement-in-principle regarding a long-term gold mining project in Long Lake 58's traditional territory.

In 2020, Long Lake 58 acquired 1,690 hectares (4,200 acres) of land, including mines and minerals, which were added to the reserve under the federal Additions to Reserves policy, making it more than six times larger. This was separate from their land claim which is still ongoing. The community has prioritized construction of additional housing on the added lands, so more members of the First Nation can live on the reserve.

In January 2021, four residents of Long Lake 58 tested positive for COVID-19. A lockdown was imposed, allowing only essential services personnel to enter the reserve.

== Government ==
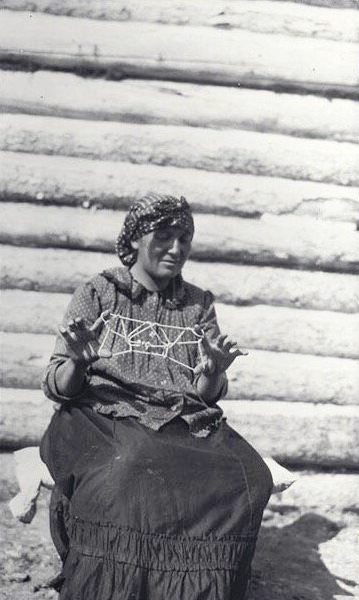
Mme Hitchen with string bear, 1916

=== Governance ===
The leadership of the First Nation is determined through the Act Electoral System. The current Chief is Judy Desmoulin, Deputy Chief Audrey Fisher, Patrick Kakegabon, Mike Fisher, Hailey Finlayson, Peter Shebagabow, Noreen Agnew, Lloyd Mclaughlin, Narcisse Kekegabon, Shirley Tyance, Roma Fisher, Duane Wesley.

The First Nation is a member of Matawa First Nations, a Regional Chiefs Council.

=== Services ===
Government services are provided by the First Nation, the Matawa First Nations and by the Nishnawbe Aski Nation. Services include:

- Migizi Miigwanan Secondary School – Principal – Tom Rivers
- Early Child Education – Coordinator – Marlene Mitchell
- Migizi Wazisin Elementary School – Education Director - Clair O'nabigon. Principal – Valerie Pheasant
- Early Learning Center – Manager – Marlene Mitchell
- Long Lake #58 General Store
- Long Lake 58 First Nation Health Center -
- Addictions and Harm Reductions Program

== Notable members ==
- Roy Thomas (1949–2004), artist
