= Matawa First Nations =

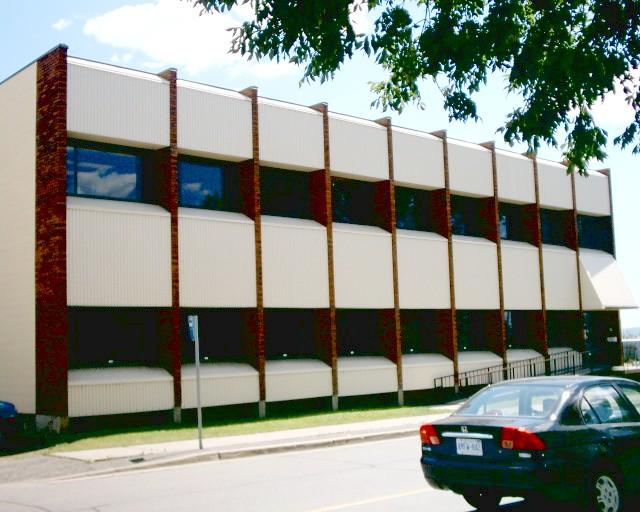
The building in which Matawa First Nations is located, on Court Street in Thunder Bay.

Matawa First Nations (Ojibwe: ᒫᑕᐙ (maadawaa, "to fork, to confluence"); unpointed: ᒪᑕᐧᐊ), known officially as the Matawa First Nations Management, is a non-profit tribal council representing nine Ojibwe and Cree First Nations in Northern Ontario, Canada. The tribal council provides advisory services and program delivery to its member First Nations.

== Mission ==
According to their website, Matawa First Nations stated mission is "... supporting each other and focusing our collective efforts on core strategic priorities. By working together as a regional community, we will use our combined knowledge and resources in order to champion the social and economic vitality of our First Nations and invest in community and people building."

== Matawa Chiefs Council ==
The Matawa Chiefs Council is composed of nine Chiefs, one from each of the Matawa member communities. The Chiefs provide political direction to the organization in its strategic planning, government relations, and policy development. To assist in these activities, the council maintains political and advocacy staff to support its efforts in helping their communities to prosper.

== Services ==
- Animal Wellness Services
- Social Services
- Communications
- Economic Development
- Environmental Services
- Financial Advisory
- Housing
- Human Resources
- Information Technology
- Employment and Training
- Education
- Healthcare Services
- Telecommunications
- Technical Services

== Member First Nations ==
- Aroland First Nation
- Constance Lake First Nation
- Eabametoong First Nation
- Ginoogaming First Nation
- Long Lake 58 First Nation
- Marten Falls First Nation
- Neskantaga First Nation
- Nibinamik First Nation
- Webequie First Nation

== Official address ==
Matawa First Nations
233 South Court Street
Thunder Bay, Ontario P7B 2X9

Website
