= Flying Post First Nation =

Flying Post 73
- Indian reserve
- Flying Post Indian Reserve No. 73
- Location within Ontario
- Coordinates: 48°32′N 82°01′W
- Country: Canada
- Province: Ontario
- District: Cochrane
- First Nation: Flying Post

Area
  - Land: 58.19 km^{2} (22.47 sq mi)

Population (2011)
  - Total: 0
  - Density: 0/km^{2} (0/sq mi)
- Website: flyingpost.ca

Flying Post First Nation is an Ojibway and Cree First Nation band government on Groundhog River, Ontario. It has a reserve called Flying Post 73.

== History ==
Reserves were first established between the government and First Nations in Northern Ontario through the signing of the Treaty #9 document in 1905 and 1906 and later additional adhesions in 1929 and 1930. In 1906, Flying Post lands were identified in a ‘Schedule Of Reserves’ in the Treaty 9 document and listed the First Nation lands as follows – '‘In the province of Ontario, commencing at a point half a mile south of Six-Mile Rapids, on the east side of Ground Hog River, thence south a distance of four miles, and of sufficient depth to give an area of twenty-three square miles.’' In the 1960s, Flying Post First Nation members began to organize themselves during the formation of First Nation political organizations such as Nishnawbe-Aski Nation (NAN). During this period they re-established themselves as a First Nation entity and elected a Chief and Council to represent their people.
