= Wawakapewin First Nation =

Wawakapewin ᐙᐙᑲᐯᐎᐣ
- Indian reserve
- Wawakapewin (Long Dog Lake) Indian Reserve
- Location within Ontario
- Coordinates: 53°27′N 89°08′W
- Country: Canada
- Province: Ontario
- District: Kenora
- First Nation: Wawakapewin

Area
  - Land: 53.91 km^{2} (20.81 sq mi)

Population (2006)
  - Total: 21
  - Density: 0.4/km^{2} (1.0/sq mi)
- Website: www.wawakapewin.ca

Wawakapewin First Nation (Oji-Cree: ᐙᐙᑲᐯᐎᐣ ᓂᐢᑕᒼ ᐊᓂᐦᔑᓂᓂᐗᐠ (Waawaagabewin Nistam Anishininiwag); unpointed: ᐗᐗᑲᐯᐎᐣ ᓂᐢᑕᒼ ᐊᓂᔑᓂᓂᐗᐠ) is an Anisininew First Nation reserve located 350 kilometres north of Sioux Lookout, Ontario. It is only accessible by air and the winter road system from Pickle Lake. It is a small community in which the registered population in June 2013 was 73, of which 43 lived on their own Reserve. The current Chief is Anne-Marie Beardy. Wawakapewin First Nation is a member of Shibogama First Nations Council.

== Official address ==
Wawakapewin First Nation
c/o Shibogama First Nation Council
PO Box 449
Sioux Lookout, Ontario P8T 1A5
