= Ginoogaming First Nation =

First Nation reserve in Ontario, Canada

- Band No. 185
- People: Ojibwe
- Treaty: Treaty 9
- Headquarters: Longlac
- Province: Ontario

Land
- Main reserve: Ginoogaming First Nation
- Land area: 69.78 km^{2} (26.94 sq mi)

Population (2025)
- On reserve: 203
- On other land: 21
- Off reserve: 786
- Total population: 1010

Government
- Chief: Sheri Susan Taylor

Tribal Council
- Nishnawbe Aski Nation

Website
- www.ginoogamingfn.ca

Ginoogaming First Nation (formerly the Long Lake 77 First Nation) is a small Anishinaabe (Ojibway) First Nation reserve located in Northern Ontario, located approximately 40 km east of Geraldton, Ontario, Canada, on the northern shore of Long Lake, immediately south of Long Lake 58 First Nation and the community of Longlac, Ontario. As of September 2006, their total registered population was 773 people, of which their on-Reserve population was 168.

== Government ==
=== Governance ===
The current Chief is Sheri Taylor, who is serving along with six councillors: Martha Taylor, Graham Echum, Lisa Echum, Derek Echum, CJ Taylor, and Kelly Fortier.

The First Nation is a member of Matawa First Nations, a Regional Chiefs Council, which in turn is a member of the Nishnawbe Aski Nation, a Tribal Political Organization representing many of the First Nations in northern Ontario.

=== Services ===
Government services are provided by the First Nation, the Matawa First Nations and by the Nishnawbe Aski Nation. Services include:

- Dilico Child & Family Services Health Program
