= Eabametoong First Nation =

Eabametoong First Nation, ᐊᐸᒪᑐᒃ ᐊᓂᔑᓇᐯ ᑕᔑᑫᐎᓐ
- Indian reserve
- Fort Hope Indian Reserve No. 64; Eabamet Lake - (post office)
- Seal
- Motto: As long at the sun shines, the grass grows, the river flows we are an Ojibway Nation
- Location within Ontario Location within Canada
- Coordinates: 51°33′22″N 87°59′14″W
- Country: Canada
- Province: Ontario
- Provincial Territorial Organization: Nishnawbe Aski Nation
- District: Kenora
- Tribal Council: Matawa First Nations
- First Nation: Eabametoong First Nation

Government
  - Type: Chief and Council
  - Chief: Parker Waswa
  - Council: List of councilors: Michael D Slipperjack; Louis Oskineegish; Donald Meeseetawageesic; Derek Atlookan
  - MP: Patty Hajdu
  - MPP: Sol Mamakwa

Area
  - Land: 244.29 km^{2} (94.32 sq mi)
- Elevation Elevation at the airport: 274 m (899 ft)

Population (2021)
  - Total: 977
  - Density: 4.1/km^{2} (11/sq mi)
- Time zone: UTC−05:00 (EST)
  - Summer (DST): UTC−04:00 (EDT)
- Postal Code: P0T 1L0
- Area code: 807
- Website: www.eabametoong.firstnation.ca

Eabametoong, also known as Fort Hope or Eabamet Lake by Canada Post, is an Ojibwe First Nations band government in Kenora District, Ontario, Canada. Located on the shore of Eabamet Lake in the Albany River system, the community is located approximately 300 km (190 mi) northeast of Thunder Bay and is accessible only by airplane via Fort Hope Airport or water, or by winter/ice roads, which connect the community to the Northern Ontario Resource Trail. The Eabametoong First Nation Reserve is completely surrounded by territory of the Unorganized Kenora District.

== History ==
Eabametoong came to be during the fur trade era when the Hudson's Bay Company set up a trading post by Eabamet lake in 1890. The canoe was used as the main source of transportation so the post had to be near water. The Fort Hope Band came into existence in 1905 when treaty number 9 was signed onto by a newly elected chief and 8 councillors representing 500 to 700 people. The new community of Eabametoong started in 1982 with the official name of Eabametoong First Nation being adopted in 1985. The main draw for the people of Eabametoong before the fur trade was the multitudes of various fish including: sturgeon, walleye, and whitefish which still inhabit the waters today.

On October 23, 2010, Chief Lewis Nate declared a state of emergency because of excessive community violence and crime, including the attempted arson of the reserve's only school. Since January 2010, there had been three confirmed homicides and approximately 50 incidents of arson in the community. As of mid-2012 there have been no further arsons. Speculation from the local police force suggested prescription drug abuse amongst the youth was fuelling the violence.

On April 7, 2016, the First Nation lost its community centre to fire which has been replaced.

The band received $649,000 in funding in 2017 from the Ontario Trillium Foundation to further develop a 2 ha (4.9-acre) farm which will enable jobs and skills training, provide fresh food for the community, and establish a local farm business. The Eabametoong Farm won a Rural Ontario Leaders Award in recognition of the growth and success of the farm, it is now expanded to 7 acres. They hope at continuing the success by adding greenhouses in the future.

The community had to be evacuated during the 2026 Canadian wildfires.

=== Etymology ===
The name Eabametoong has a significant meaning in the Anishinaabe language; the name means, "at the reversing of the waterplace." The water flow from Eabamet lake into the Albany River reverses each year, resulting from spring runoff water, such that water flows into Eabamet lake from the Albany River for a short period of time.

== Demographics ==
Historical populations
Year	Pop.	±%
1991	453	—
1996	801	+76.8%
2001	1,001	+25.0%
2006	1,144	+14.3%
2011	1,072	−6.3%
2016	1,014	−5.4%
2021	977	−3.6%

The population of Eabametoong First Nation is 2,190, of which approximately 1,300 members live in the community of Eabametoong. The total population of people living on the reserve includes non-band members, such as teachers, nurses and members of other bands. The average household size is 4.3 with 110 households having 5 or more residents.

Age	Population	Percentage
0-14	385	37.9
15-64	585	57.6
65+	35	3.4
85+	5	0.5
Total	1015	100

Source: Statistics Canada

== Geography and climate ==
The community of Eabametoong First Nation (Fort Hope) is situated on the north shore of Eabamet Lake, which is part of the Albany River Drainage basin.

=== Climate ===
Fort Hope has a humid continental climate (Köppen Dfb) with cold winters and warm, although short summers with frequent rainfall.

Climate data for Fort Hope
Month	Jan	Feb	Mar	Apr	May	Jun	Jul	Aug	Sep	Oct	Nov	Dec	Year
Mean daily maximum °C (°F)	−12.0 (10.4)	−9 (16)	−4 (25)	5 (41)	16 (61)	22 (72)	25 (77)	24 (75)	17 (63)	8 (46)	−1 (30)	−9 (16)	6.8 (44.4)
Mean daily minimum °C (°F)	−23 (−9)	−21 (−6)	−14 (7)	−4 (25)	4.0 (39.2)	10 (50)	14 (57)	12 (54)	7.0 (44.6)	0 (32)	−8 (18)	−18 (0)	−3.4 (26.0)
Average precipitation mm (inches)	23 (0.9)	19 (0.7)	32 (1.3)	43 (1.7)	68 (2.7)	78 (3.1)	79 (3.1)	58 (2.3)	74 (2.9)	63 (2.5)	47 (1.9)	28 (1.1)	612 (24.2)
Average precipitation days (≥ 0.2 mm)	10.2	8.6	18.9	12.9	17	16.8	20.6	18.5	12.2	12.3	12.4	11.3	171.7
Average snowy days (≥ 0.2 cm)	10	8.4	9.5	5	1.2	0.0	0.0	0.0	0.1	3.3	9.3	11	57.8
Source: Meteoblue

== Resource extraction ==
Eabametoong is one of the First Nations communities with traditional lands in the Ring of Fire. Eabametoong and Neskantaga indigenous communities are calling on the province to "re-set" the process governing mining development in the Ring of Fire, saying they aren't being properly consulted. A recent court case made it clear that mining companies and the government have the duty to consult these first nation communities before mining can commence. The decision issued July 16, 2018 by a three-judge panel of the Divisional Court of Ontario's Superior Court of Justice reinforces the obligation of governments to reach out to First Nations, Inuit and Métis when development could affect their way of life. Eabametoong Chief Elizabeth Atlookan stated: "[The decision] goes a long way in making sure that both levels of government, as well as the companies that wish to come and do exploration or any other work going forward, follow proper procedures."

== Government ==
=== Chief and council ===
Eabametoong First Nation governed by an elected Chief and five councillors. The current Chief is Saul Atlookan. The Councillors are Josie Sugarhead, Louie Sugarhead, Fred Meeseetawageesic, Charlie Okeese and Donald Meeseetawageesic. They are elected for a two-year term by band members over the age of 18. In addition to the Governance Council, boards oversea some the Council's operations: Education, Youth Council, etc.

=== Tribal councils ===
The community and Matawa are represented by the Nishnawbe Aski Nation (NAN). NAN is a political territorial organization that represents the 49 First Nations that are part of the Treaty No. 9 area in Northern Ontario. At the provincial level, the community, tribal council and political territorial organization participate in a province-wide coordinating body, the Chiefs of Ontario. The Assembly of First Nations represents the community along with other First Nations organizations and councils, as well as over 600 First Nations across Canada.

=== Political representatives ===
The town is represented in the House of Commons of Canada by Liberal MP Patty Hajdu in the Thunder Bay—Superior North electoral district, and in the Legislative Assembly of Ontario by NDP MPP Sol Mamakwa in the new electoral district of Kiiwetinoong.

=== Emergency services ===
Eabametoong is policed by the Nishnawbe-Aski Police Service, an indigenous-based police service in Northern Ontario.

=== Partner city ===
Eabametoong First Nation has a partnership with the City of Markham through a partnership accord. Through a Cultural Collaboration Agreement the communities have agreed to:

- Promote social, cultural and economic collaboration in conjunction with Canada's sesquicentennial celebration in 2017
- Promote harmony and goodwill for the betterment of their residents
- Stimulate public awareness.

== Education ==
John C Yesno Education Centre provides education for students from JK to Grade 9. The school was rebuilt in the late 1990s and can hold a maximum of 289 students (INAC guidelines). Secondary and Post-Secondary students attend schools in Thunder Bay, Sioux Lookout and beyond. The school is modern, well-equipped, and has two computer labs, a library with a Smart Board, a science lab, weight room, woodworking shop, and a kitchen. In early 2024, the school unfortunately got burned down by a few young men.

== Sites of interest ==
Miminiska is a tourist camp that is accessible by air or travel on a boat on the Albany River. Every fall, hunters from Eabametoong will fly to Miminiska to hunt for moose and set nets for sturgeon.

The original settlement of Fort Hope, now called Old Fort Hope, is located on Eabamet Lake to the west of the current town site. There are two churches still standing, a Catholic and an Anglican. Access is by boat in the summer time and snowmobile once the lake is frozen.

Recreational facilities include an arena, community hall, Pow-wow grounds, recreational trails and swimming spots. The school has a Gymnasium, which can be booked for evening and weekend use, sports fields and playgrounds.

== Language ==
Most of the older population speaks or understands Ojibway. Children are taught in Ojibway and English at John C Yesno Education Centre as part of language revitalization initiatives.

== Sports ==
Many people in Eabametoong enjoy active lifestyles. In the winter, hockey is the most popular, home to the Mens Northern Bands Hockey Tournament Champs 2014 "Bush Town Jets", Eabamet Lake Stealers, and Eabametoong Trappers, boys hockey name "Bush Town Jets Jr's" and broomball tournaments are organized at the local arena. In 2017, John C Yesno Education Centre started the first girls hockey team in Eabametoong. They went to their first tournament in Thunder Bay

In summer baseball is the sport of choice. In 2016, the JCY Wolves participated in two tournaments in Thunder Bay, in which they won both of them. It was the second year that the school has sent a team

== Infrastructure ==
Local roads are maintained by the First Nation, while the airport and main streets are maintained by the Ontario Ministry of Transportation. The winter road connected to the provincial highway system in Pickle Lake.

== Health and medicine ==
Kevin S.C. Sagutcheway Nursing Station is run by Indigenous Services Canada (Ontario Region) and provides primary health care to residents.

Eabametoong Health and Social Services provides services that promote physical and mental health for community members. They provide health education regarding diabetes, cancer, and other serious ailments They also offer programs that help with addiction, pregnancy, parenting, drug awareness, and crisis intervention.

== Transportation ==
Eabametoong is accessible by air year-round by means of 3,500 ft (1,100 m) gravel airstrip located at the Fort Hope Airport, with scheduled and chartered flights. Communities with road connections include: Thunder Bay, Sioux Lookout and Nakina. There are also flights to other fly-in communities. The airlines flying into Eabametoong are North Star, Wasaya and Zam Air. Docking facilities are also available for floatplanes during the open water season.

Snowmobiles and trails are also in use between isolated communities during the winter months

== Media ==
There are two radio stations CBC Radio and Local Radio (101.5 FM). - Wawatay is present in the community, Wawatay radio is put over the local radio waves and Wawatay newspaper is delivered bi-weekly.

== Notable citizens ==
- Benjamin Chee Chee (1944–1977), artist
- Ruby Slipperjack, author/educator
