= Marten Falls First Nation =

Marten Falls 65
- Indian reserve
- Marten Falls Indian Reserve No. 65
- Location within Ontario
- Coordinates: 51°40′N 85°55′W
- Country: Canada
- Province: Ontario
- District: Kenora
- First Nation: Marten Falls

Area
  - Land: 81.43 km^{2} (31.44 sq mi)

Population (2021)
  - Total: 243
  - Density: 2.9/km^{2} (7.5/sq mi)
- Website: community.matawa.on.ca

Marten Falls First Nation is an Anishinaabe First Nation reserve located in northern Ontario. The First Nation occupies communities on both sides of the Albany River in Northern Ontario, including Ogoki Post (Ojibwe: Ogookiing) in the Cochrane District and Marten Falls in the Kenora District. As of December 2013, the First Nation had a total registered population of 728 people, of which their on-reserve population was 328 people.

== Profile ==
Ogoki is a First Nation community managed by the Marten Falls Band. It has a registered population of roughly four hundred people, with additional transient residents fulfilling healthcare, teaching or policing roles. The town is served by Ogoki Post Airport, and has its own community radio station, CKFN 89.9 FM (a repeater of CKWT-FM).

The only road access to the community is through winter roads, and it is fly-in only in terms of year-round travel. The community has worked to maintain an ice road in recent years; however, from 2000 to 2014, there were no winter roads.

== Government ==
=== Governance ===
Marten Falls First Nation elects its council members through the Act Electoral System for a two-year term, consisting of a chief and seven councillors. Chief Ambrose Achneepineskum's term ran from September 30, 2017, to September 29, 2019. The councillors are: Russell Achneepineskum, Paul Achneepineskum, Sam Achneepineskum Sr, Bob Baxter, Shane Baxter, Eli Coaster, Allan Moonias, Linda Moonias, and Darrin Spence.

=== Council ===
As a signatory to Treaty 9, Marten Falls First Nation is a member of the Matawa First Nations, a Regional Chief's Council, and Nishnawbe Aski Nation, a Tribal Political Organization representing the majority of the First Nations in northern Ontario. Through these council memberships, the First Nation receives additional services, ranging from Economic Development assistance and Health Care assistance to Nishnawbe-Aski Police Service.

=== Services ===
The healthcare in the community is serviced by a First Nations Inuit Health (a branch of Health Canada) clinic staffed by community health nurses (CHN). There is a K-8 school (Henry Coaster Memorial School) that staffs teachers from both outside the community and within the First Nation. The on-reserve version of Children's Aid is provided through Tikinagan Child and Family Services. Ogoki is policed by the Nishnawbe-Aski Police Service, an Aboriginal-based service.

=== Reserve ===
The First Nation has reserved for themselves the 7,770.1-hectare (19,200-acre) Marten Falls Indian Reserve 65, located on the north bank of the Albany River, about 170 km (110 mi) northeast of Nakina, Ontario.

== History ==
Historical populations
Year	Pop.	±%
2006	221	—
2011	190	−14.0%
2016	252	+32.6%
2021	243	−3.6%

Marten Falls was the home of Chanie Wenjack, a young boy who died in 1966 while trying to return home after escaping from an Indian residential school. His story was dramatized in Secret Path, a multimedia music, film and graphic novel project by Gord Downie and Jeff Lemire.

== Transportation ==
Marten Falls is proposing a new all-season access road to be built to replace the winter road. The new road will connect to Ontario Highway 643 at its northern terminus northwest of Aroland. The First Nation is served by Ogoki Post Airport, which connects to Thunder Bay and other First Nations through air transport.
