= CHRC =

CHRC may refer to:

- CHRC-FM, a radio station (92.5 FM) in Clarence-Rockland, Ontario, Canada
- CHRC (defunct), a defunct radio station (800 AM) licensed to Quebec City, Quebec, Canada
- Canadian Human Rights Commission
- Chaparral Railroad
