= CHWE-FM =

Radio station in Winnipeg, Manitoba

Coordinates: 49°45′20″N 97°07′53″W

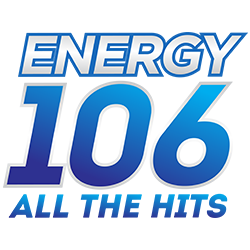
- Winnipeg, Manitoba; Canada
- Broadcast area: Winnipeg Metropolitan Region
- Frequency: 106.1 MHz
- Branding: Energy 106

Programming
- Format: Contemporary hit radio

Ownership
- Owner: Evanov Communications
- Sister stations: CKJS-FM, CFJL-FM

History
- First air date: July 29, 2011
- Former call signs: CFJL-FM (July–November 2011)
- Call sign meaning: "Winnipeg's Energy"

Technical information
- Class: C1
- ERP: 45,000 watts average 77,000 watts peak
- HAAT: 184 metres (604 ft)

Links
- Webcast: Listen Live
- Website: energy106.ca

CHWE-FM (106.1 FM, "Energy 106") is a radio station in Winnipeg, Manitoba. Owned by Evanov Communications, it broadcasts a contemporary hit radio format.

CHWE-FM's studios and offices are located behind Polo Park at 202-1440 Jack Blick Avenue in Winnipeg, with sister stations CKJS-FM and CFJL-FM. The transmitter is located at Duff Roblin Provincial Park.

== History ==
In June 2008, the CRTC considered four applications for new radio stations in Winnipeg, including an application by Evanov for a new FM station on 104.7 FM carrying a soft adult contemporary/"new easy listening" format. The CRTC approved the application by Evanov, as well as one for a new Aboriginal station proposed by Native Communications, Inc. (NCI). However, because both applications requested 104.7 FM, the CRTC directed Evanov to find an alternative frequency for its station, believing that the NCI station "would make better use" of the frequency than Evanov's station.

On May 8, 2009, the CRTC approved the use of 106.1 FM for the new Evanov station instead. On July 29, 2011 at Noon, following a period of on-air testing, the new station launched as rhythmic contemporary Energy 106 under the call letters CFJL-FM, beginning with a commercial-free marathon of 10,000 songs. Programming director Barry Stewart told the Winnipeg Free Press that although it was not their original plan for the station, the station was "bombarded" with listener feedback suggesting that it go in a top 40/dance direction. Energy would compete primarily with Astral Media's long-dominant CKMM-FM. The station would be based from the studios of CHNK-FM and CKJS—which Evanov was in the process of acquiring—on Corydon Avenue. CFJL marked Evanov's first radio station in Western Canada.

In October 2011, the station began adding on-air talent. On November 26, 2011, CFJL changed its call sign to CHWE-FM, to match the "Energy" moniker. The CFJL call sign would move to its sister station.

The new station's dance-leaning playlist paid off in the Numeris ratings, where in its first book it took a 6.9% share of the audience. The station has since moved to a more mainstream Top 40 direction, although it continues to carry a DJ mixshow on weekdays during afternoon drive, and on Saturday nights.

In August 2020, Dave Wheeler, formerly of CITI-FM, was announced as the station's new morning host beginning August 31. The hiring proved controversial, as he had originally been fired from CITI in 2018 after making transphobic comments on his morning show. The station's program director defended the hiring, stating that Wheeler had "changed to fit us". Wheeler stated that "I have done a lot of work on me. It's profoundly personal when you take a deep look inside. I have put it all in the rear-view."
