= CHRF =

Former radio station in Montreal

Coordinates: 45.5405°N 73.5904°W

- Montreal, Quebec; Canada
- Frequency: 980 kHz
- Branding: AM 980

Programming
- Language: French
- Format: Adult standards

Ownership
- Owner: Evanov Radio Group
- Sister stations: CFMB, CHSV-FM

History
- First air date: February 2, 2015
- Last air date: May 31, 2020
- Call sign meaning: Radio Fierté (format)

Technical information
- Class: B
- Power: 50,000 watts day 10,000 watts night

CHRF (980 kHz) was a French language commercial AM radio station in Montreal, Quebec, Canada. Owned by Evanov Radio Group, the station broadcast an adult standards radio format, along with some multicultural programming. CHRF's studios were located on Papineau Avenue in the Rosemont–La Petite-Patrie borough of Montreal, while its transmitter is located near Mercier.

== History ==
=== Preparing to broadcast ===
Between its sign-on in 1959 until 1990, 980 in Montreal was the home of CKGM, for many of those years, Montreal's leading English-language CHR/Top 40 station. Then from 1990 until 2012, CKGM was heard at 990, so it could broadcast at 50,000 watts fulltime, the maximum power permitted for Canadian AM stations. In 2012, CKGM moved to an even better frequency, clear channel Class A 690, leaving 980 or 990 available for another Montreal AM station to use. Several applicants sought permission to put a new station on the air using CKGM's old frequency.

The Evanov Radio Group was awarded a license by the Canadian Radio-television and Telecommunications Commission (CRTC) on November 21, 2011, with the intent to air a francophone LGBT-based talk and music format similar to the company's CIRR-FM in Toronto. CHRF was initially licensed to broadcast at the 990 kHz frequency previously occupied by CKGM. At 990, the new station was to have begun operations in 2013, operating with a power of 50,000 watts as a class B station, using a directional antenna at night in order to protect two Class A stations at that same frequency, Clear-channel station CBW in Winnipeg, Manitoba, and CBY in Corner Brook, Newfoundland and Labrador.

On July 25, 2013, Evanov filed a request with the CRTC to relocate CHRF to 980, due to potential coverage problems using the directional antenna. There are no clear channel stations using 980, nor are there any close by that broadcast there currently. The closest ones are CFPL in London, Ontario; WCAP in Lowell, Massachusetts; WOFX in Troy, New York; and WTEM in Washington, D.C. In addition, the closest 980 allocations to Montreal had since been vacated, following the moves of CBV in Quebec City (1997) and CKRU in Peterborough (2009) to FM. The frequency change was approved on December 4, 2013. CKGM, the former occupant of 990, relocated there from 980 in 1990.

On September 18, 2014, Evanov announced that the station planned to commence broadcasting in November 2014. Testing of the 980 signal, consisting of pop music, promotional material, and invitations to the public to report reception issues, began in late October 2014.

=== Radio Fierté ===
CHRF's programming, under the name Radio Fierté, debuted at 6:00 a.m. on February 2, 2015. (It had been delayed from January 2015.) Programming on CHRF under the LGBT format was similar in style to its Toronto sister station CIRR-FM, and included morning program Les Barbus (The Beards) with Michel Duchesne and Sylvain Verstricht; Les matins lesbiens (Lesbian Mornings) with Véronique Chevrier; afternoon program Marino et ses Diamants (Marino and the Diamonds), hosted by Marie-Noëlle "Marino" Gagnon; and drive-time program Les Pétards (The Firecrackers), hosted by Joe Bocan and Miguel Doucet. Chart programs included Doucet's nightly Ta Playlist, and two Saturday chart shows, Le Top 10 Franco and Le Top Anglo, hosted by Duchesne, Verstricht and Doucet, plus a Sunday morning music show, La Chansonnette avec Marino.

On December 1, 2015, CHRF dropped the "Radio Fierté" format after just 10 months, and began stunting with Christmas music as AM 980. Much like its previous format, the station aired Christmas music in both English and French, while the station's imaging was completely in French, per condition of its license.

=== Switch to adult standards ===
On December 28, 2015, CHRF adopted an adult standards format, still as AM 980 (but with branding modelled upon Evanov's "Jewel" soft adult contemporary stations). The original plan was to play adult standards during daytime hours, while the station would air programming targeting the Haitian community during evening hours. Under the standards format and during the holidays, when the station switches to Christmas songs (which returned in 2016), all music broadcast on CHRF was automated, without using disc jockeys or live personalities.

In the Numeris ratings for the period during December 2015 through February 2016 (when CHRF's Christmas stunt and standards/Haitian formats were in effect), the station finished in last place among both Anglophone and Francophone stations surveyed, with an average of 100 Francophone and zero Anglophone listeners each day, and a market share of 0.1% and 0.0%, respectively.

By June 2016, CHRF reintroduced hosted music programming, with weekday morning show Café Rivard (hosted by music director Alain Rivard), afternoon drive time program Le Retour de Plaisance (with program director Serge Plaisance), a Saturday night LGBT discussion program LGBT Avec Vous (hosted by Danyel Turcotte and Arlet Fara), and Sunday Italian music program Arcobaleno Musicale (with Mario Lipari). CHRF discontinued its evening Haitian programming, with lounge music block Soireés Loungy heard weekday evenings. In all cases, conditions set forth in its license in terms of music and talk content remained in force.

=== Closure ===
Challenged by cutbacks and the advent of COVID-19 pandemic in Montreal, Evanov made the decision to close CHRF and return its license to the CRTC. The station officially signed off at 11:59 p.m. on May 31, 2020. In a farewell message posted on the station's website, program director Serge Plaisance announced that his show and those of Johanne Verdon and Mario Lipari would be moving to sister station CFMB.
