= CKIC-FM =

Former radio station at Red River College in Winnipeg, Manitoba

Coordinates: 49.9182°N 97.2121°W

- Winnipeg, Manitoba; Canada
- Frequency: 92.9 MHz
- Branding: 92.9 KICK-FM

Programming
- Format: Alternative rock

Ownership
- Owner: Cre-Comm Radio Inc.

History
- First air date: April 27, 2004
- Last air date: July 4, 2012
- Call sign meaning: From "Kick" branding

Technical information
- ERP: 0.25 kW

CKIC-FM was an instructional over-the-air campus radio station that broadcast in Winnipeg, Manitoba on the frequency 92.9 FM from April 27, 2004 to July 4, 2012. Starting in the Fall of 2012, it plans to return to the air as an internet-only radio station.

The original purpose of the station was to provide real-world education in the field of radio broadcasting to students enrolled in the Creative Communications program at Red River College and to deliver programming distinct from that offered by other radio stations within the city.

In November 2003, CITI-FM (Winnipeg) and CKKQ-FM (Victoria) personality and programmer Rick Baverstock was hired as the station manager for CKIC-FM.

Kick-FM was owned and operated by the non-profit corporation, Cre-Comm Radio, Inc.

== History ==
The station began broadcasting a test signal on December 15, 2003 and officially launched on April 27, 2004. Initially, the station followed a Triple-A format. At the time, this was the first of its kind in Canada. Kick-FM used the tag line 'A Rock 'n' Soul Adventure' for the first year of its existence.

With the arrival of short-lived CKFE-FM, Kick-FM migrated to a unique Modern Rock format. The selections featured songs popular in the UK and at College radio in the U.S. In addition, Kick-FM played more Winnipeg-based musicians than any other station in the city (22% of its play list). The majority of music on Kick-FM's play list was unique to this station, with little overlap from other stations.

After several years as "Winnipeg's New Sound," Kick-FM began to identify itself as "Winnipeg's Indie Station - Independent Rock, Independent Talk." The musical emphasis swung away from the more established alternative artists (now being played locally by CURVE 94.3, see CHIQ-FM) and now concentrates on music by unsigned, independent artists. For four years, the station also hosted a weekday talk program by citizen journalist, blogger, community activist and government critic, Marty Gold. This program was abruptly taken off the air by the board running the station, soon after a new President took office at Red River College.

In March 2007, the regular morning show host Al McClean stepped down after a long successful run to go on to greater opportunities. That wasn’t the end of the morning show. At the time 92.9 KICK-FM was named the number 3 favorite Winnipeg radio station (behind #2 Hot 103 and #1 Power 97) in a poll by readers of Uptown Magazine; Gavin Trevan and Chelsea Miller took over and in May 2008, 92.9 KICK-FM was named the number 2 favorite Winnipeg radio station (behind #1 Hot 103) in a poll by readers of the same magazine.

On January 23, 2012, the CRTC ruled that campus radio stations in Canada must allow for community access similar to a community radio station. This move meant that CKIC chose to relinquish their licence due to this decision. On July 4, 2012, at 4 PM, the station indeed shut down its operation as an over-the-air broadcaster and turned in the corresponding license to the CRTC. There was a considerable reaction to this abandonment of the license, notably from former community members of the station and citizen journalists. However, CKIC expected to return as an internet-streaming station for the start of the Fall 2012 semester.

== Notes ==
Gill Broadcasting applied to use CKIC-FM's former 92.9 MHz frequency in Winnipeg for a new ethnic/multilingual radio station that was denied by the CRTC in 2015 but was later used by CKYZ-FM a low-power 50 watt tourist information station owned by Gill Broadcasting until it moved to 96.9 MHz in 2018 after Evanov Communications received approval from the CRTC to convert CKJS from the AM band to the FM band at 92.7 MHz in 2017 which is the first adjacent frequency of 92.9 MHz.
