= CKPC =

CKPC may refer to:

- CKPC (AM), a defunct radio station (1380 AM) formerly licensed to Brantford, Ontario, Canada
- CKPC-FM, a radio station (92.1 FM) licensed to Brantford, Ontario, Canada

== See also ==
- CPKC, abbreviation for Canadian Pacific Kansas City, a railway holding company
