= CIRR-FM =

LGBT radio station in Toronto

Coordinates: 43°39′56″N 79°22′52″W

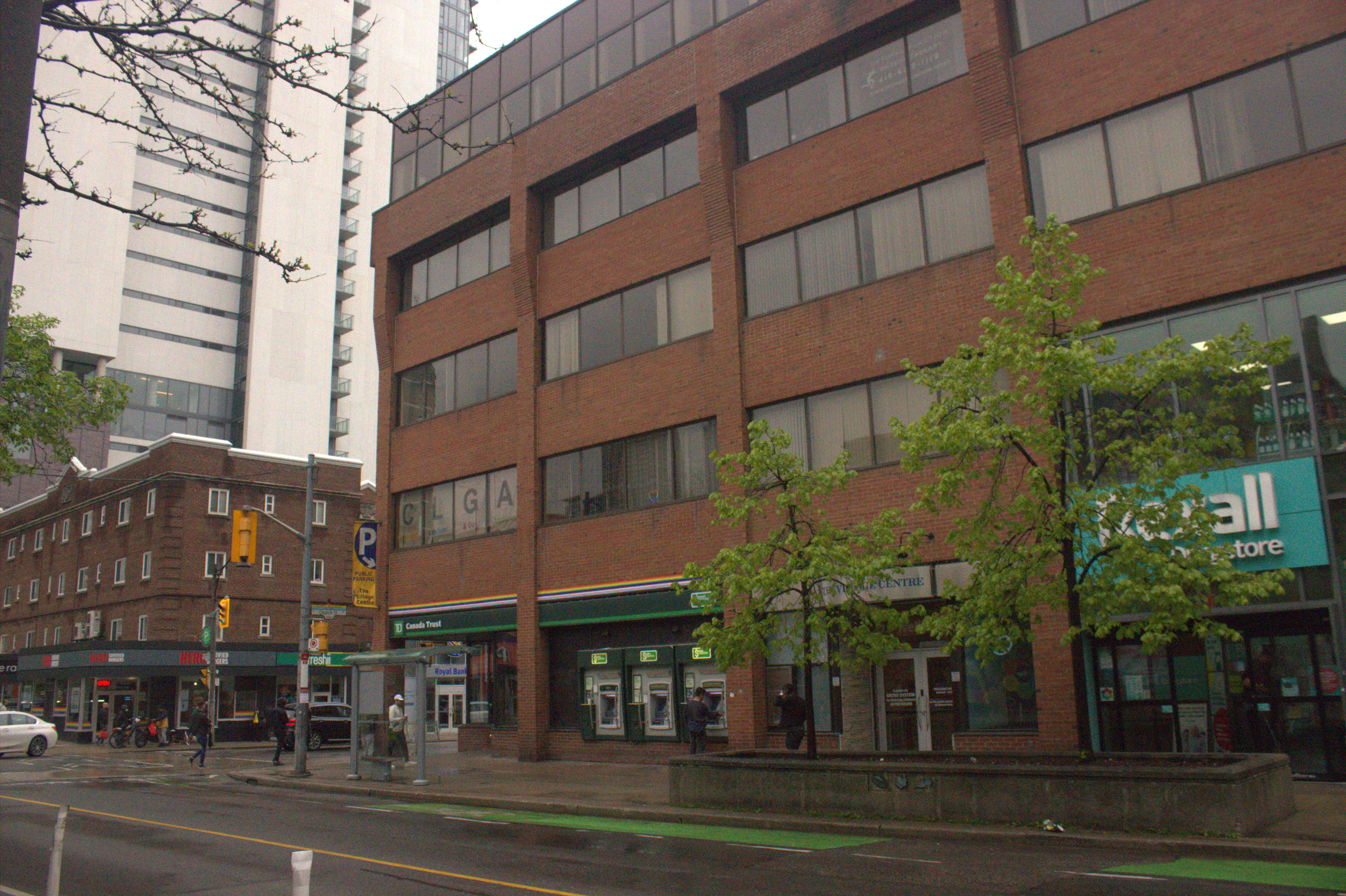
- Toronto, Ontario; Canada
- Broadcast area: Greater Toronto Area
- Frequency: 103.9 MHz
- Branding: 103.9 Proud FM

Programming
- Format: LGBT-oriented rhythmic contemporary
- Affiliations: Premiere Networks

Ownership
- Owner: Evanov Communications
- Sister stations: CIDC-FM, CHLO, CKDX-FM

History
- First air date: April 16, 2007
- Last air date: August 31, 2023
- Call sign meaning: Rainbow Radio (pre-launch name)

Technical information
- Class: A1
- ERP: 225 watts
- HAAT: 123 m

Links
- Website: proudfm.com

CIRR-FM (103.9 MHz, 103.9 Proud FM) was a radio station in Toronto, Ontario. Owned by Evanov Communications, it broadcast a rhythmic contemporary format with a focus on the area's LGBT community. Launching on April 16, 2007, it was the first radio station in Canada targeted specifically to an LGBT audience, and the first commercial, terrestrial radio station in the world to target such an audience. It was one of six stations in Toronto that reports to Nielsen BDS' Canadian Top 40 airplay panel.

Originally broadcasting from Toronto's Church and Wellesley neighbourhood, CIRR's studios were subsequently located on Dundas Street West in the Eatonville neighbourhood of Toronto, while its transmitter was located atop the Sheraton Centre on Queen Street West in downtown Toronto across from Toronto City Hall.

On August 16, 2023, Evanov announced that the station would be shut down effective September 1, with its staff reassigned to sister station CIDC-FM.

== History ==
=== Application and launch ===
The application was filed by Rainbow Media Group, a partnership between Evanov Radio Group and other private investors, in 2005, and was approved by the Canadian Radio-television and Telecommunications Commission on April 5, 2006. The company planned a format featuring a mix of popular and classic music (with daytime focused primarily towards current and classic hits, and evenings featuring more specialty rhythmic, dance, and world music), with spoken word programming oriented towards Toronto's LGBT community (including at least 7 hours of news programming, and 21 hours of talk/information programming per week). The station also promised to fund a $5,000 annual scholarship to journalism, art or music students at Humber College and Carleton University, and a $30,000 stage showcase for musical artists at Toronto's Pride Week celebrations. Programming would be partially overseen by a community advisory committee. The company first applied for this licence in 2000, but was denied in favour of Milestone Radio's CFXJ, Canada's first urban music station.

Several interventions opposing the application, as well as National Post columnist Lorne Gunter, noted that the CRTC had not issued an open call for other applications, alleging that the application was given special treatment by the CRTC for "politically correct" reasons — notably, Gunter directly linked the station's approval to the CRTC's denial in 2003 of a licence for a Roman Catholic radio station in Toronto, alleging religious discrimination. In the licence approval, the CRTC noted that because the proposed 103.9 frequency is second-adjacent to Evanov's own CIDC, and Evanov would therefore have to give its consent to accept a zone of radio frequency interference to its signal, the company would effectively have held a veto over any competing application for the frequency. The Catholic station, conversely, was one of eight applicants for a single frequency, 101.3, which was awarded to the multicultural station CJSA-FM.

Pink Triangle Press, the publisher of the city's LGBT newspaper Xtra!, was originally a partner in the application. The company pulled out in December 2005, alleging that Evanov was using the application as a backdoor into the Toronto market — where reception of the company's existing rhythmic contemporary station, CIDC-FM Orangeville is unreliable — and intended to eventually drop the LGBT programming and convert the station to a mainstream format or rebroadcaster of CIDC. Evanov stated a commitment to serving LGBT audiences, but refused Pink Triangle's request to have the commitment reiterated in a legally binding contract.

=== Post-launch ===
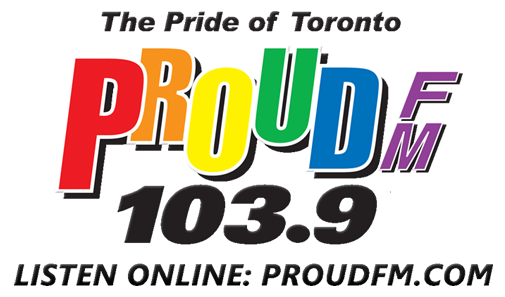
Former logo, used in variations until 2020

In 2009, Evanov bought out the remaining owners of Rainbow Media Group, becoming the station's sole owner.

In the station's early years, some listeners noted that even in the Church and Wellesley Village itself, the station's signal was sometimes drowned out by CBL-FM's rebroadcaster in Peterborough or by CKDK-FM from Woodstock. In 2010, the station applied to the CRTC to increase its signal from 50 watts to 128 watts, with an ERP of 250 watts, which received CRTC approval on June 9, 2010. However, the station still broadcast from a transmitter location near Yonge and Eglinton in the Midtown region, rather than from a downtown location like most other radio stations in the city, and its signal later deteriorated even further as condominium development increased in the area. CIRR has since relocated its transmitter to the top of the Sheraton Centre on Queen Street.

CIRR was the first commercially licensed LGBT-oriented radio station in Canada and the world. Evanov Communications was granted a license in November 2011 for a second LGBT-oriented station, a French language signal in the Montreal, Quebec market. The station, CHRF, which was originally proposed to have launched in 2013 at the 990 AM frequency, would not begin broadcasting until February 2, 2015, after a series of delays that also included a frequency change to 980 AM. However, the format was not successful, resulting in CHRF dropping the Radio Fierté format on December 1, 2015, after just 10 months, switching to an adult standards format, and later shutting down in 2020 due to continued low ratings.

In September 2011, Evanov submitted an application with the CRTC to move CIRR to 88.1 MHz, formerly held by CKLN-FM, and to increase its transmitter power. Per the CRTC's competitive licensing process, a call for competing applicants for the frequency was issued (where Evanov also proposed a "new easy listening" station). The license was ultimately awarded to Rock 95 Broadcasting Ltd., which launched adult album alternative CIND-FM on the frequency.

In 2018, Evanov filed an application to swap CIRR and CIDC's frequencies and power, with a proposal to convert CIDC to a low-power station on 103.9 that would specifically serve its city of license Orangeville, and CIRR to a full-power station on 103.5 that would assume CIDC's existing CHR format, and move the existing LGBT community programming to an HD Radio subchannel. The CRTC denied the application in January 2020, citing technical restrictions, and past attempts by Evanov to relocate CIDC in a manner that would neglect its city of license and undermine the commission's competitive licensing process.

On August 16, 2023, Evanov announced that Proud FM would be shut down at the end of August 2023, citing that "all broadcasters are now contending with the challenges of increased competition, a difficult economic climate, and the residual effects of the COVID-19 pandemic." CIRR's remaining local personalities Jaret Sereda and Tyler Carr took on roles at CIDC, with Carr moving his weekend show to the station, and Sereda serving as an on-air contributor.

== Programming ==
On September 13, 2006, Evanov announced that the station's morning program would be hosted by Ken Kostick and Mary Jo Eustace, the former co-hosts of the television cooking show What's for Dinner?. Eustace left the program in June 2008. Kostick would also depart the station in December 2008, after which the morning show was co-hosted by Deb Pearce and Adam Lawrence. Lawrence left the station in June 2009 to pursue a teaching career, and was replaced by Patrick Marano. On October 6, 2020, as part of an effort to rebrand the station, Richard Ryder's Rise with Ryder was replaced with the syndicated Elvis Duran and the Morning Show as its first Canadian affiliate; the program's host Elvis Duran came out as gay in 2010, and has supported LGBT organizations.

Other hosts that have appeared on the station include Cajjmere Wray, Shaun Proulx, Deb Pearce, Patrick Marano, Mark Wigmore, Paul Bellini, Crystal Lite, Danielle Loncar, Acey Rowe and Sean Cowan. Comedian Maggie Cassella was also part of the station's original roster of hosts, but left the station as of August 2007. Pearce, Marano, Proulx and Wigmore were all dropped from the station in May 2010.
