= Evanov Communications =

Canadian radio broadcasting company

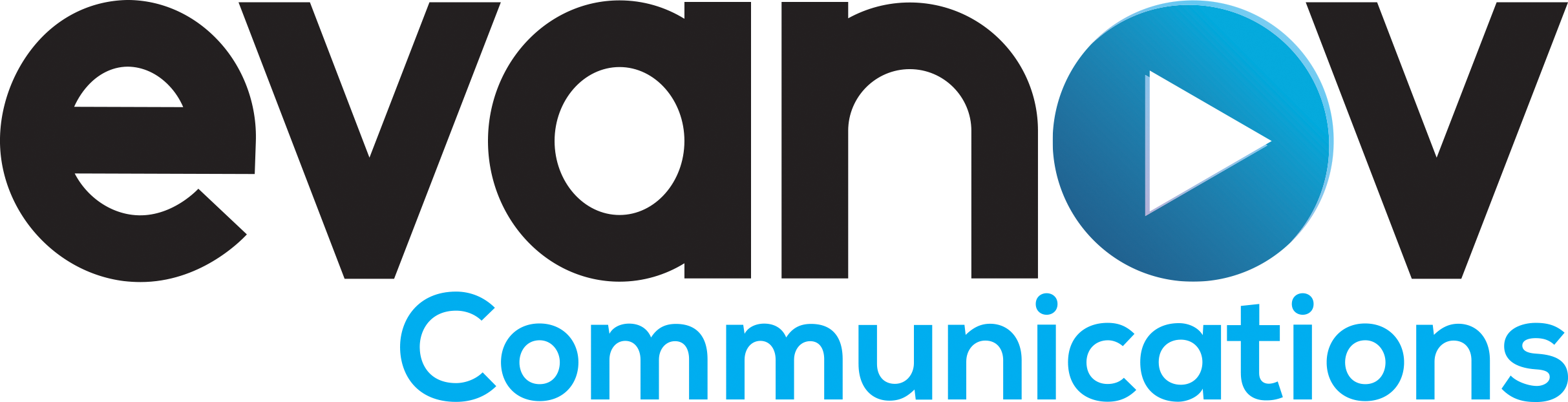
- Formerly: Evanov Radio Group
- Type: Private
- Industry: Media
- Founded: Etobicoke, Ontario (1984)
- Headquarters: Toronto, Ontario
- Key people: Bill Evanov Founding President/ CEO (1984–2020); Paul Evanov President and CEO, formerly VP
- Website: evanov.ca

Evanov Communications is a Canadian radio broadcasting company. It is also the sole owner of Dufferin Communications Inc., 80% owner of Halifax Broadcasting Ltd. and Ottawa Media Inc. The group of Evanov companies owns and operates a number of radio stations in Ontario, Quebec, Manitoba and Nova Scotia.

== History ==
Evanov Radio Group logo

In 2006, as part of the consortium Rainbow Media Group, Evanov received a license for CIRR-FM, an LGBT community radio station in Toronto.

In July 2009, Evanov acquired Telephone City Broadcast of Brantford, Ontario, including CKPC.

On March 16, 2011, Evanov applied to operate a new FM radio station in Muskoka Lakes, Ontario. The CRTC denied Evanov's application on September 27, 2011. If the application was approved, the new station would operate a new adult contemporary format on the frequency 104.7 MHz.

Dufferin was also one of the applicants for the 690 kHz frequency in Montreal previously occupied by CINF, with plans to launch a French-language radio station geared towards Montreal's LGBT community. On November 21, 2011, Dufferin was awarded the 990 kHz frequency instead, which became vacant after Bell Media's CKGM relocated to 690. Following that station's relocation, the 990 frequency received the callsign CHRF. Evanov filed a request with the CRTC in July 2013 to sign on CHRF instead on 980 kHz and to delay start-up until 2014, due to forecasted reception problems with the 990 signal. CHRF began testing on 980 in November 2014, with the intent on a formal launch in January 2015.

In May 2011, Newcap Radio announced that it was selling its two stations in Winnipeg, CKJS and CHNK-FM, to Evanov; the sale was approved on October 24, 2011. On November 26, 2011, CFJL-FM became CHWE-FM and CHNK-FM became CFJL-FM.

On January 20, 2012, Evanov announced that Dufferin applied with the CRTC to establish a new Soft AC station in Hudson, Quebec, a western suburb of Montreal; the new station would broadcast at 106.7 MHz at 500 watts at 94 metres HAAT. The frequency choice, however, would have conflicted with CKDG-FM's plans to relocate to 106.7, the frequency previously used by an Aboriginal Voices repeater in Montreal; however, on February 6, 2012, CKDG notified the CRTC that they had withdrawn its application for the frequency change, though it was unknown whether or not Evanov's application for the new station had to do with its decision. The new station would receive the callsign CHSV-FM in February 2013. Testing of its signal began on November 4, 2014, though an actual, launch date has yet to be determined.

On April 10, 2012, Evanov announced that Dufferin applied with the CRTC to establish a new adult contemporary station in Clarence-Rockland, Ontario. The CRTC approved Evanov's application on February 25, 2013, and the new station will operate at 92.5 MHz. In June 2013, the new 92.5 was assigned the call letters CHRC-FM.

On July 12, 2013, Evanov announced that Dufferin applied with the CRTC to establish a new adult contemporary station in Meaford, Ontario, at 99.3 MHz. That application was approved on January 22, 2014.

On November 18, 2014, it was announced that Evanov would acquire CFMB Montreal from CFMB Limited, pending CRTC approval. In addition to establishing a cluster with CHRF and (to a lesser degree) CHSV-FM, the sale also reunited the station with CKJS in Winnipeg, which was established by CFMB's founder Casimir Stanczykowski.

On January 7, 2015, the CRTC denied Evanov's application for a new station in the Township of Ramara, Ontario, citing that the station would have an undue negative impact on neighbouring markets.

On December 4, 2017, Evanov's stations joined Bell Media's iHeartRadio Canada service.

Founder and CEO Vasil William (Bill) Evanov died on February 28, 2020, at the age of 77.

On July 13, 2020, Acadia Broadcasting announced its intent to acquire CKHZ-FM and CKHY-FM in Nova Scotia from Evanov.

In August 2023, Evanov began shutting down stations, in all cases citing increased competition, changing listener habits, and economic conditions brought upon by the COVID-19 pandemic. This began with CKPC/Brantford and CIRR/Toronto.

In September 2024, Evanov also announced the closure of CJWL-FM/Ottawa, CHRC-FM/Clarence-Rockland, and CKHK-FM/Hawkesbury effective September 20, 2024. However, on September 19, Evanov announced that it had reached eleventh-hour agreements to sell all three stations; CHRC and CKHK were sold to Radio communautaire Cornwall-Alexandria—a cooperative that operates the French-language community station CHOD-FM in Cornwall, and CJWL was sold to Torres Media, owner of Ottawa's CIDG-FM. Both groups filed applications for the purchases with the CRTC on January 24, 2025, and operated the stations under temporary management agreements until they were formally approved.

On April 20, 2026, it was announced that Torres Media had intent to acquire CHSV-FM in Hudson and Saint-Lazare, Quebec from Evanov. The application was approved on October 14, 2026.

== Radio properties ==
=== Ontario ===
- Brampton: CHLO
- Brantford: CFWC-FM, CKPC-FM
- Meaford: CJGB-FM
- Newmarket: CKDX-FM (70% ownership)
- Orangeville: CIDC-FM

=== Manitoba ===
- Winnipeg: CFJL-FM, CHWE-FM, CKJS-FM

=== Quebec ===
- Montreal: CFMB

=== Defunct ===
- Brantford: CKPC
- Montreal: CHRF
- Toronto: CIRR-FM

=== Former ===
- Halifax: CKHZ-FM, CKHY-FM (sold to Acadia Broadcasting in 2021)
- Hawkesbury: CKHK-FM (sold to Radio communautaire Cornwall-Alexandria in 2025)
- Ottawa: CJWL-FM (sold to Torres Media in 2024)
- Rockland: CHRC-FM (sold to Radio communautaire Cornwall-Alexandria in 2025)
- Hudson/Saint-Lazare: CHSV-FM (sold to Torres Media in 2026)

== Ownership ==
According to a Canadian Radio-television and Telecommunications Commission chart compiled in August 2016, the ownership was distributed as follows:

Evanov Communications Inc. is held by William Evanov (74.25%), Paul Evanov (25%) and by The Bill Evanov Family Trust (0.74%).

Mr. William Evanov held 99.70% of Evanov Radio Group Inc. The remaining 0.3% is held by Evanov Communications Inc.

Evanov Communications Inc. holds 80% of HFX Broadcasting Ltd. and Ottawa Media Inc. The remaining 20% is held by Carmela Laurignano at 10% and Kymberly Joseph 10%.

Evanov Communications Inc. holds 70% of CKDX Radio Limited. The remaining 30% is held by 1093641 Ontario Limited, which in turn is 100% held by 1234870 Ontario Limited.
