= CJGB-FM =

Radio station in Meaford, Ontario

Coordinates: 44°34′6.96″N 80°32′3.12″W

- Meaford, Ontario; Canada
- Frequency: 99.3 MHz
- Branding: Lite 99.3

Programming
- Format: Soft adult contemporary

Ownership
- Owner: Evanov Communications

History
- First air date: September 1, 2014

Technical information
- Class: A
- ERP: 850 watts
- HAAT: 177 metres (581 ft)

Links
- Webcast: Listen Live
- Website: lite993.ca

CJGB-FM (99.3 MHz, Lite 99.3) is a Canadian radio station in Meaford, Ontario. Owned by Evanov Communications, it broadcasts a soft adult contemporary format.

== History ==
On January 22, 2014, Dufferin Communications Inc. (Dufferin) received approval from the CRTC to operate a new English-language commercial FM radio station in Meaford, Ontario. The station was given the working title Apple FM, but this was changed to Evanov's networked Jewel brand by May. The station began on air testing at 99.3 FM in August and officially launched on September 1, 2014 as Jewel 99.3.

As with other "Jewel" stations, the station primarily carries soft adult contemporary music, including the syndicated John Tesh show, and the networked evening program The Lounge, which carries adult standards and smooth jazz.

On September 3, 2020, Evanov received CRTC approval to increase the average and maximum effective radiated power for CJGB-FM from 100 to 850 watts in order to improve the station's signal in Meaford.

On July 16, 2021, the station dropped its "Jewel" branding and changed it to Lite 99.3 with its slogan "South Georgian Bay's Lite Favourites".

== Former logos ==
Jewel 99.3 logo from 2014-2021
