= CFJL-FM =

Radio station in Winnipeg, Manitoba, Canada

Coordinates: 49.7556°N 97.1314°W

- Winnipeg, Manitoba; Canada
- Broadcast area: Winnipeg Metropolitan Region
- Frequency: 100.5 MHz
- Branding: Hot 100.5

Programming
- Format: Classic hits

Ownership
- Owner: Evanov Communications
- Sister stations: CKJS-FM, CHWE-FM

History
- First air date: December 9, 2002 (as CHNR-FM)
- Former call signs: CHNR-FM (2002–2005); CKFE-FM (2005–2006); CHNK-FM (2006–2011)
- Former frequencies: 100.7 MHz (2002–2016)
- Call sign meaning: "Jewel" (former branding)

Technical information
- Class: C1
- ERP: 63,500 watts; 100,000 watts peak
- HAAT: 206.1 meters (676 ft)

Links
- Webcast: Listen Live
- Website: hot1005fm.com

CFJL-FM (100.5 FM, Hot 100.5) is a commercial radio station in Winnipeg, Manitoba. Owned by Evanov Communications, it broadcasts a classic hits radio format focusing on pop, rhythmic, and rock music from the 1980s, 1990s, and 2000s.

CFJL-FM has studios and offices co-located with sister stations CKJS-FM and CHWE-FM at Polo Park. The transmitter is off St. Mary's Road at Duff Roblin Provincial Park in Saint Germain.

== History ==
=== Standards, AAA, Country ===
The station signed on in 2002 as CHNR-FM, an adult standards station owned by CKVN Radiolink System Inc. The station originally broadcast at 100.7 MHz, and was only powered at 1,300 watts, a fraction of its current power.

It was acquired by Newcap Radio in 2005. The station was branded as Cafe 100.7 and adopted an adult album alternative (AAA) format on December 26 of that year with the call sign CKFE-FM. On December 28, 2006, the station became CHNK-FM and was rebranded as Hank 100.7 playing a classic country format.

=== Power boost ===
In September 2007, CHNK successfully applied to the Canadian Radio-television and Telecommunications Commission (CRTC) for a power increase, citing reception difficulties in the market. On December 6, the station was granted the power increase, taking 100.7 FM from 1,300 watts to an average effective radiated power (ERP) of 60,200 watts.

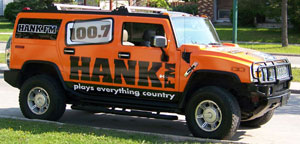
The "Hank Tank" Hummer H2 (2007)

On July 6, 2010, the station became K-Rock 100.7 and switched to a blues-leaning classic rock format, retaining its CHNK call sign. By 2011, CHNK began shifting towards a mainstream rock direction by adding newer live versions of classic rock songs.

=== Sale to Evanov, Jewel ===
In May 2011, Newcap announced that it was selling CHNK and CKJS to Evanov Communications, pending CRTC approval. On October 24, 2011, the CRTC approved the sale.

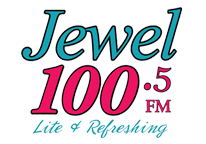
Logo as Jewel 100.5, following its 2015 frequency change.

On November 26, 2011, CHNK began stunting with Christmas music for the holiday season as The Lounge 100.7. It also changed its call letters to CFJL-FM (moving them from its sister station, which concurrently changed its calls to CHWE-FM). On Boxing Day, CFJL re-branded as 100.7 The Breeze, with a soft adult contemporary and adult standards format. Like all AC stations owned by Evanov, CFJL was a reporter to the Mediabase and Nielsen BDS Canadian AC panels. In early November 2013, the station dropped its "Breeze" branding and rebranded as simply 100.7 Lite and Refreshing. On January 1, 2014, the station adopted Evanov's standardized "Jewel" branding, becoming Jewel 101 FM.

Beginning in 2014, CFJL became the radio flagship for Winnipeg Goldeyes baseball games. In the press announcement for this broadcasting agreement, the station was referred to as 100.7 FM, suggesting a possible rebrand of the station in the next year. Indeed, in October 2013, the CRTC approved a change to CFJL's broadcast licence that released it from operating in a specialty format, thus allowing the station to shift to a straightforward soft AC format. Evanov argued that the requirement to broadcast specialty music had harmed its economic viability.

=== Move to 100.5 ===
In August 2014, the CRTC approved a request by Evanov to move CFJL to the frequency of 100.5 FM, and increase its power to 100,000 watts. Evanov felt that the 100.7 frequency had attracted a poor stigma among advertisers and listeners due to the station's failed attempts to "generate audience interest" under specialty formats. As such, the company believed that moving CFJL would improve the station's viability by providing improved reception, and the opportunity to re-launch the station. The CRTC approved the request.

On the evening of May 25, 2015, the station went off air to allow technicians to install the new, more powerful transmitter. It came back on air on May 26 at 10:00 a.m., and rebranded as Jewel 100.5 FM. Despite the move to the new frequency, the station continued to have poor advertising revenue and ratings (in the Fall 2016 Numeris Ratings Report, CFJL held a 2.9 share of the Winnipeg market).

Previous "Hot 100.5" logo

=== Hot 100.5 ===
On February 17, 2017, at 3:00 p.m., CFJL-FM flipped to rhythmic adult hits as Hot 100.5, which focused primarily on rhythmic and pop hits from the 1990s and early-2000s. In October 2021, CFJL flipped to classic hits, relaunching the Hot branding with an expanded playlist adding 1980s music and rock hits.
