= CKJS-FM =

Radio station in Winnipeg

Coordinates: 49°44′07″N 97°11′36″W

- Winnipeg, Manitoba; Canada
- Broadcast area: Winnipeg Metropolitan Region
- Frequency: 92.7 MHz (HD Radio)
- Branding: CKJS FM 92.7

Programming
- Format: Multilingual

Ownership
- Owner: Evanov Communications
- Sister stations: CFJL-FM, CHWE-FM

History
- First air date: March 25, 1975
- Former frequencies: 810 kHz (1974–2022)

Technical information
- Class: B
- ERP: 14,599 watts (24,000 watts maximum)
- HAAT: 182 metres (597 ft)

Links
- Webcast: Listen Live
- Website: ckjs.com

CKJS (92.7 MHz) is a commercial FM radio station in Winnipeg, Manitoba. It shares studios and offices in Polo Park with sister stations CFJL-FM and CHWE-FM. It is the only multilingual radio station in Manitoba, broadcasting in more than 20 languages: Bulgarian, Chinese, Filipino, German, Hebrew, Hindi, Hungarian, Irish, Polish, Portuguese, Punjabi, Spanish, Ukrainian and Vietnamese. It also broadcasts blocks of Christian radio programming on weekdays and Sundays.

CKJS has an effective radiated power (ERP) of 14,599 watts (24,000 watts maximum). The transmitter is in Duff Roblin Provincial Park just south of Winnipeg.

== History ==
=== 810 AM ===
The plan for a multilingual AM radio station in Winnipeg was started in 1974 by Casimir Stanczykowski. CKJS 810 AM first signed on the air on March 25, 1975. It was Stanczykowski's second radio station, behind Montreal's multicultural station CFMB.

In the 1980s, it also had, for a very short time, a cutting edge alternative music program called Nightbeat. This program was responsible for promoting local talent and giving airplay to music that wasn't being played on mainstream radio. It was unusual for Modern Rock and other alternative music to be heard on commercial radio in this era.

In 2006, the station was sold to Newcap Broadcasting. In May 2011, Newcap announced the sale of both CKJS and CHNK-FM to Evanov Communications, pending CRTC approval. The deal was approved on October 24, 2011. In November 2014, Evanov announced that it would acquire CFMB, which re-united both of Stanczykowski's stations under common ownership.

=== Move to 92.7 FM ===
In November 2017, Evanov received CRTC approval to convert CKJS to an FM station on 92.7 FM.

On September 21, 2021, CKJS began simulcasting on its new FM frequency, and in HD Radio—the first station in Manitoba to do so. CJKS's AM signal continued operations until February 21, 2022, after which it was shut down—completing its transition to FM.

92.7 is a first adjacent frequency of 92.9 that was formerly used by CKIC-FM which left the air in 2012. Gill Broadcasting applied to use CKIC's former 92.9 frequency in Winnipeg for a new ethnic/multilingual radio station that was denied by the CRTC in 2015 but was later used by CKYZ-FM a low-power 50 watt tourist information station owned by Gill Broadcasting without a CRTC license until it moved to 96.9 MHz in 2018 after Evanov received approval from the CRTC to convert CKJS to the FM band at 92.7 MHz in 2017.
