= CIDG =

CIDG can refer to:

- CIDG-FM, a Canadian radio station
- Civilian Irregular Defense Group, an irregular military unit used during the Vietnam War
- Criminal Investigation and Detection Group, the primary investigation arm of the Philippine National Police
