= CHLO (AM) =

Radio station in Brampton, Ontario

- Brampton, Ontario; Canada
- Broadcast area: Greater Toronto Area
- Frequency: 530 kHz (HD Radio)
- Branding: AM 530

Programming
- Format: Multilingual (Punjabi and other South Asian languages)

Ownership
- Owner: Evanov Communications
- Sister stations: CIDC-FM, CIRR-FM, CKDX-FM

History
- First air date: December 23, 1953
- Former call signs: CFJB (1953–1964); CHIC (1964–1979); CKMW (1979–1987); CIAO (1987–2019)
- Former frequencies: 1090 kHz (1953–1964); 790 kHz (1964–1991)
- Call sign meaning: "Hello"

Technical information
- Licensing authority: CRTC
- Class: B
- Power: 1,000 watts (day); 250 watts (night)
- Transmitter coordinates: 43.588179°N 79.884006°W

Links
- Webcast: Listen live
- Website: www.am530.ca

CHLO (530 AM) is a commercial radio station in Brampton, Ontario, serving Greater Toronto. It is owned by Evanov Communications and broadcasts a multilingual format. Most programming is Punjabi with other languages of South Asia. Some Italian, German, Croatian, Tagalog, Bulgarian, and Spanish language shows are heard on weekends. CHLO's radio studios and offices are on Dundas Street West in the Eatonville neighbourhood of Toronto.

By day, CHLO transmits with 1,000 watts non-directional; due to restrictions placed on the frequency by international treaty, it reduces power at night to 250 watts. The transmitter is on Sixth Line in Halton Hills. CHLO is one of only a few commercial radio stations in North America broadcasting on 530 kHz.

== History ==
The station signed on the air on December 23, 1953. It originally broadcast on 1090 kHz as CFJB, a daytimer owned by broadcaster Fen Job. Job was killed in a car crash in 1956, and the station was sold by his estate to CHIC Ltd. in 1959, adopting the new callsign CHIC the following year.

In the 1960s, Alekos Columbos hosted a 90-minute Greek radio show on Saturdays and Klaas Mulenar preached in Dutch on Sundays, as the station incorporated more ethnic broadcasts into its schedule. In 1961, the owners also launched an FM station, CHIC-FM on 102.1 MHz.

In 1964, CHIC became a full-time broadcaster, moving to 790 AM. From 1966 to 1969, it tried a new twist in an era where almost all radio voices were male. It launched an all-female disc jockey format using the slogan "Where The Girls Are." Regular newscasts and some other features continued to be voiced by men.

In 1977, the FM station adopted the new call sign CFNY-FM.

In 1979, the stations' owner went into receivership. The stations were subsequently acquired by Civitas Corp., the owner of CJMS in Montreal. Civitas became Mutual Communications in 1980, and CHIC adopted the new callsign CKMW. Mutual subsequently sold CKMW to Patrick Hurley, who incorporated as CKMW Radio Ltd., in 1983; CFNY was sold to Selkirk Communications.

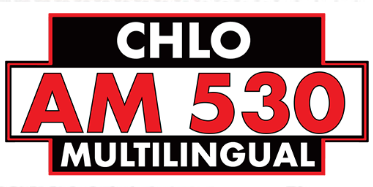
CHLO former logo

As CKMW, the AM station adopted its current multilingual format, and ownership of CKMW Radio was transferred to Evanov in 1985.

The station adopted the new call sign CIAO in 1987, and moved to its current frequency in 1991 after CJFT in Fort Erie converted to the FM band. In January 2019, it adopted its current call sign of CHLO.

== HD Radio ==
On June 8, 2021, CHLO became the first AM station in Canada to transition to HD Radio on the AM band.

== FM rebroadcaster proposal ==
On June 18, 2026, Dufferin Communications (Evanov) submitted an application to add a new rebroadcasting FM transmitter at 103.9 MHz in Brampton, to rebroadcast CHLO 530 AM. The 103.9 MHz frequency was formerly used by a now defunct Dufferin radio station CIRR-FM Toronto, and is a second adjacent frequency to CIDC-FM Orangeville, which operates at 103.5 MHz. The applicant also proposed to relocate CIRR-FM's transmitter from Toronto to CHLO-AM's tower in Georgetown. CHLO-AM tower is owned by Dufferin.
