= Hollay Ghadery =

Hollay Ghadery is an Iranian-Canadian writer born in Toronto, Ontario, whose debut novel The Unravelling of Ou was published in 2026.

Ghadery, who grew up in Uxbridge, has an MFA in creative writing from the University of Guelph. Her debut book Fuse, a memoir of mixed-race mental health, was published in 2021 and won the 2023 Canadian Book Club Award for Nonfiction/Memoir. She won the 2022 Nick Blatchford Occasional Verse poetry contest, before her debut collection, Rebellion Box, was published by Radiant Press in 2023. In the same year, she was named the inaugural poet laureate of the township of Scugog.

She has also been a co-host of Angie’s Book Club on CIUX-FM, a host on The New Books Network, a co-host of HOWL on CIUT-FM, an editor with the literary magazine Minola Review, and founder of the book publicity agency River Street Writing.

She published the short story collection Widow Fantasies in 2024, which was longlisted for The Toronto Book Awards, and followed up with the poetry collection the blades of grass are dreaming in 2025.

The Unravelling of Ou was longlisted for the 2026 Giller Prize.
