= CFWC =

CFWC may refer to:

- CFWC-FM, a Canadian radio station, broadcasting at 93.9 FM in Brantford, Ontario.
- Central Financial Work Commission, a governmental body made in 1998 to regulate the Chinese financial system.
- California Federation of Women's Clubs, an organization of Women's clubs in California
- Colorado Federation of Women's Clubs
