= CIDC-FM =

Radio station in Orangeville, Ontario

Coordinates: 43°54′43″N 79°56′15″W

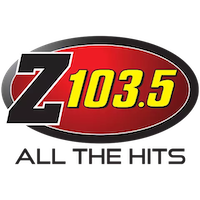
- Orangeville, Ontario; Canada
- Broadcast area: Central Ontario, Greater Toronto Area
- Frequency: 103.5 MHz (HD Radio)
- Branding: Z103.5

Programming
- Format: dance/CHR

Ownership
- Owner: Evanov Communications
- Sister stations: CHLO, CKDX-FM

History
- First air date: May 1, 1987

Technical information
- Licensing authority: CRTC
- Class: B
- ERP: 30.7 kW
- HAAT: 190.3 metres (624 ft)
- Repeater: 92.1 CKPC-HD2

Links
- Webcast: Listen Live
- Website: z1035.com

CIDC-FM (103.5 FM, "Z103.5") is a radio station licensed to Orangeville, Ontario. Owned by Evanov Communications, it broadcasts a dance radio format serving Greater Toronto and adjacent areas of Central and Midwestern Ontario. Its studios are located on Dundas Street West in the Eatonville neighborhood of Toronto, while its transmitter is located near Airport Rd and Charleston Sideroad in Sleswick.

CIDC has historically broadcast an electronic dance music-leaning rhythmic contemporary format; it has regularly featured DJ mixshows as part of its schedule, and has also sponsored local electronic music events and compilation albums. CIDC held a 2.0 share of the market in Numeris's Spring 2018 ratings.

In addition to Orangeville, its signal covers Barrie and Kitchener, rimshots Downtown Toronto, and can be heard as far north as Bracebridge and as far south as Hamilton. Due to CIDC rimshotting Downtown Toronto, CIDC has frequently promoted itself as a Toronto station, and Evanov has made repeated attempts to move or modify CIDC's signal to better serve the Greater Toronto Area; almost all of these requests were denied by the CRTC for neglecting its formal city of licence. The CRTC also reprimanded CIDC for not specifically devoting enough on-air community interest programming, news, sports and information specific to Orangeville or Dufferin County, as specified by its license.

== History ==
The Orangeville area was struck by a massive F4 tornado as part of the 1985 United States–Canada tornado outbreak on May 31, 1985, and the community felt it did not receive adequate warning from stations in Toronto. As such, an application was made to the CRTC for a radio station to serve Orangeville. CRTC approval was given for the station on September 10, 1986, under a guideline not to solicit advertising from Toronto, Barrie or Brampton. The station's frequency allocation was originally specified for Guelph, and was moved to Orangeville to allow for the service.

CIDC was launched on May 1, 1987, on 103.5 MHz with an ERP of 50,000 watts from a site located northwest of Orangeville. Its transmitter's terrain, which measured 527.3 metres (1,730 ft) height above average terrain, and tower height of 98.1 metres (322 ft) meant it was .6 metres (2.0 ft) higher than the top of CN Tower. CIDC's launch format as "DC 103.5" was 70's/80's hits.

Original Z103.5 logo

On September 28, 1994, the CRTC approved the ownership transfer of Dufferin Communications from its shareholders to CKMW Radio Ltd., operator of Brampton multicultural station CIAO. The station was branded Hot 103.5 in February 1995 (later calling it "Hot 103 dot 5"), playing only dance music. The station then began adding more R&B and pop tracks to its Top 40/dance playlist in February 1998, and was renamed Hits 103.5.

On July 28, 2000, approval was given to relocate the transmitter site from 6 km west of Orangeville town hall to 11 km east of Orangeville town hall and decrease the station's power from 50,000 watts to 30,700 watts.

In late December 2000, the station was re-branded as Z103.5 (with the decimal point heard as "dot"), with the slogan "The Hit Music Channel", though the CIDC call letters were retained. The slogan was later changed to simply "Today's Hit Music".

Until the summer of 2006, CIDC was the only radio station in Canada that played dance music since CING-FM changed formats in 2001. It was the only Top 40 station left in Toronto after CISS-FM became "Jack FM" in 2003. For a brief period in 2001, CKDX-FM also played dance music but poor ratings led it to switch to an oldies format.

In the summer of 2006, Evanov launched a new station in Halifax, Nova Scotia, also on 103.5, patterned after CIDC, though with a different logo and slogan. In 2011, Evanov began to brand all it stations only by whole numbers.

As of the summer of 2012, the station's slogan is "#1 For Hit Music", following the other top 40 stations in Toronto, CKIS-FM and CKFM-FM, which both claimed to be "Toronto's #1 Hit Music Station". As of 2016, CIDC reverted to the slogan "All The Hits."

Previous Z103.5 logo

Despite the decrease in dance music, the station's highest-rated program continues to be The Drive @ 5 Street Mix with DJ Danny D. The show is mixed live with vinyl records and Compact Discs. In 2000, the show started out as a 30-minute Friday afternoon mix, but soon expanded into a 1-hour set. By 2004–2005, the set was so popular that CIDC introduced the "Drive @ 5" five times a week. Recently, as of 2008, high-profile guest DJ's have started to mix live for the Drive @ 5 on several occasions including David Guetta, Tiesto, and Armin van Buuren (his show A State of Trance can be heard Sunday nights on this station). The station also had a Saturday Night edition of the "Drive @ 5 Street Mix" for a time. A similar show, The Power Mix with DJ Spence Diamonds, used to air three nights a week (Wednesday, Thursday, and Friday nights). The show, which featured urban music, was cut in the fall of 2007. In 2011, the station introduced a mix show during the lunch hour, dedicated to hits from the 1980s, 1990s, and early 2000s, called the Wayback Lunch.

The station aired some programming hosted by Canadian DJ Chris Sheppard in the mid-1990s to the early 2000s, including Pirate Radio and Groove Station.

CIDC also had a weekly show on Sundays called the Freestyle Frenzy, hosted by veteran Tony Monaco. It was solely a show of freestyle music and mixes. It aired from June 4, 1995, to January 2004, and was replaced with the syndicated American Top 40. As of the summer of 2008, that show was removed from the schedule. CKFM-FM later picked up the show after its relaunch as Virgin Radio.

MC Mario also previously held regular Sunday programming called "The Mixdown" which ran for a full hour in the afternoon until 2004

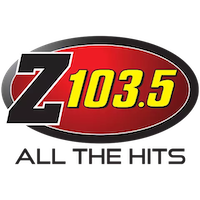
Previous Z103.5 logo under former "All the Hits" slogan

Dance music makes up approximately 20-30% of the CIDC playlist and programming.

Currently, the station competes with fellow top 40 stations CKFM-FM, CKIS-FM, CING-FM, CHAY-FM, and to a lesser extent, hot AC station CHUM-FM.

On September 21, 2020, CIDC-FM launched a digital signal in the HD Radio format. As of October 2026, CIDC-FM is also available on sister station CKPC-FM 92.1 HD2 sub-channel in southwestern Ontario.

On January 12, 2026, CIDC segued to a full-time dance radio positioning (reflected by a change in slogan from "All the hits" to "Feel the beat")—promoting an increased amount of electronic dance music in comparison to its previous rhythmic CHR-leaning presentation, and a particular increase in focus on European acts. It also added two new half-hour mixshows at 9 p.m. and midnight, and a new commercial-free music block at 9 a.m. Alongside the changes, Ronnie Stanton (formerly a director of Rogers' Vancouver cluster and adult hits stations, and currently Evanov brand manager for CIDC and CKPC-FM) became a new co-host of The Z Morning Zoo alongside Melanie Martin.

== Attempts to relocate ==
On January 12, 2015, Evanov filed an application for permission to relocate CIDC's transmitter to Georgetown, using the tower of its sister station CIAO-AM, and increase its average power from 37.5 kW to 51 kW. Evanov stated that the move would help to improve reception in Downtown Toronto (especially inside buildings) to add one million potential new listeners, and deploy HD Radio services simulcasting CIAO. The application was denied by the CRTC, citing that the proposed changes would reduce coverage in Orangeville and increase its strength in an out-of-market area, thus neglecting its city of licence. The CRTC ruled that Evanov Communications did not "[demonstrate] a financial need justifying the proposed technical changes". On September 15, 2017, Evanov Communications submitted an application to increase the effective radiated power of CIDC-FM, with no change in frequency.

During CIDC's licence renewal process, the CRTC also noted that the station had been neglecting its city of licence in its news and information content, relating specifically to the GTA as a whole rather than Orangeville; the station's website and social presences contain no mention at all of Orangeville, or of any news and weather. As a condition of its licence renewal, the CRTC ordered the station to regularly broadcast content of direct and particular relevance to Orangeville (including news headlines and other local information), traffic and weather reports for markets within its signal contours, refrain from exclusively devoting this coverage to Toronto, and to identify as an Orangeville station.

In 2018, Evanov Communications filed an application to swap CIDC and CIRR’s frequencies and change their ERP, with CIDC moving to 103.9 under reduced power to specifically serve the Orangeville market, and CIRR moving to a full-power signal on 103.5, which would inherit CIDC's existing programming. Evanov Communications proposed moving the previous LGBT community programming on CIRR to an HD Radio subchannel, committing to produce five original hours of programming per-day. Evanov also filed another application to change CIDC-FM's frequency from 103.5 to 103.7. The application was denied by the CRTC on January 31, 2020, who ruled that it would undermine the commission's competitive licensing process, and cited technical restrictions related to use of the frequencies in both markets.

== Compilations ==
Z103.5 has released various music compilation CDs, mixed by DJ Danny D and later The Hammer. The 3 series included Hitmix, Streetmix, and Summer Rush, named after the concert of the same name. They released from 2002 until 2018.

== Concerts and live-to-air programs ==
The station annually hosts a number of live concert events. Past and present concerts include the Hot Rush (created in 1993 as Energy Rush, now Summer Rush), Euro-Freestyle Invasion (now Euro Invasion), and Partymania. Most of the concerts are sold-out because they are mostly filled with performances by dance artists that usually don't get much publicity. Its sister station in Halifax also started holding a similar Summer Rush concert in 2007, usually around the same time as its Toronto sibling.

The Summer Rush has been held at various venues over the years, including the Molson Amphitheatre at Ontario Place, Polson Pier (previously known as The Docks), and, more recently, the Kingswood Theatre at Canada's Wonderland. Typically, venues have changed every three to five years. There have been over a hundred artists featured from Europe, South America, USA, and Canada, including Real McCoy (twice – 1997 and 2009), Culture Beat (twice – 1993 and 2004) Cascada (three times – 2004, 2006, 2008), DHT, B4-4 (a crowd favourite), Joee, Sarina Paris, Len, The Boomtang Boys, Snap!, Waldo's People, Do (singing DJ Sammy's "Heaven"), Haiducci, DC Project, Jam & Spoon, Elissa, Stevie B, Ian Van Dahl, Sash!, Rupee, Kevin Lyttle, Jesse McCartney, JoJo, Elise Estrada, Basshunter and Daddy Yankee.

The station also hosts live-to-airs from various Toronto-area nightclubs three to five nights per week. Wednesdays have been wayback playbacks from Club Menage since 2002 (hence the term Wayback Wednesdays), but they have recently moved to Gravity Soundbar, Bloke, and now Ristorante Buonanotte. Thursdays are live from Sugar Daddy's in Mississauga, playing the best R&B, Hip-Hop, Reggae, and Dancehall. Fridays they broadcast out of Gravity Soundbar. Saturday nights are live from My Apartment in Mississauga.

On November 11, 2015, Tony Monaco announced that after nearly 14 years, Wayback Wednesdays would end on November 25, 2015.

On March 23, 2016, Wayback Wednesdays returned to Z103.5, back by popular demand, broadcasting live from Ristorante Buonanotte. Low turnouts at the venue caused the show's cancellation a few months later.
