= CITM-FM =

Radio station in Ottawa

Coordinates: 45.42945°N 75.69044°W

- Ottawa, Ontario; Canada
- Broadcast area: National Capital Region, Eastern Ontario, Western Quebec, Upstate New York
- Frequency: 98.5 MHz
- Branding: Mix 98.5

Programming
- Format: Adult contemporary

Ownership
- Owner: Torres Media
- Sister stations: CIDG-FM

History
- First air date: February 20, 2006
- Former call signs: CJWL-FM (2006–2024)
- Call sign meaning: Torres Media

Technical information
- Licensing authority: CRTC
- Class: A
- ERP: 1,100 watts (maximum 2,500 watts)
- HAAT: 100.5 metres (330 ft)

Links
- Website: mix985fm.ca

CITM-FM (98.5 MHz Mix 98.5) is a Canadian radio station in Ottawa, Ontario, Canada. It is owned by Torres Media and broadcasts an adult contemporary format. CITM's studios are located in the business park of St. Laurent Boulevard alongside sister station CIDG-FM, while its transmitter is located in downtown Ottawa.

== History ==
In June 2005, the CRTC granted a license to CKMW Radio Ltd.—a company owned by Bill Evanov—for a new FM radio station in Ottawa, Ontario; the company proposed an adult standards/easy listening format. On February 20, 2006, the station launched as CJWL-FM with the branding Jewel 98.5; similar to sister stations CKDX and CKPC-FM, the station broadcast a mix of soft adult contemporary and adult standards music.

On October 6, 2009, CJWL received CRTC approval to increase power from 485 watts to 1,100 watts.

In May 2021, Evanov rebranded CJWL as Lite 98.5, maintaining an adult contemporary format. Evanov stated that Lite would be "more current" while still "retain[ing] the best elements" of Jewel.

=== Sale to Torres Media ===
On September 5, 2024, Evanov announced that the station, along with CKHK-FM in Hawkesbury and CHRC-FM in Rockland, would close effective September 20, 2024, due to increased competition, changing listener habits, and economic conditions brought upon by the COVID-19 pandemic. However, on September 19, Evanov announced that it had reached agreements to sell all three stations, with plans for CJWL to be announced the following week. On September 23, Evanov announced that CJWL would be sold to Torres Media, owner of 101.7 CIDG-FM, pending approval by the CRTC.

On November 1, 2024, Torres Media began operating the station under a temporary management agreement ending no later than November 30, 2025, pending the CRTC's approval of the sale. At this time, the station relaunched its adult contemporary format as Mix 98.5, and applied for the new call letters CITM-FM. On January 24, 2025, Torres Media formally submitted an application with the CRTC to acquire CITM-FM

The CRTC approved Torres Media's application on June 30, 2025.
