= CKOU-FM =

Radio station in Georgina, Ontario

- Georgina, Ontario; Canada
- Broadcast area: York Region
- Frequency: 93.7 MHz

Programming
- Format: Country music

Ownership
- Owner: Torres Media

History
- First air date: October 26, 2020

Technical information
- Licensing authority: CRTC
- Class: B
- ERP: 8,804 watts (maximum ERP of 39,000 watts)

Links
- Website: kcountry937.com

CKOU-FM is a Canadian radio station, which operates at 93.7 MHz (FM) in Georgina, Ontario, Canada. It airs a country music format as K Country 93.7. Its studio is located in the community of Keswick.

== History ==
On July 11, 2018, the Canadian Radio-television and Telecommunications Commission (CRTC) approved an application by Frank Torres on behalf of a corporation to be incorporated (OBCI) to operate a new English language radio station at Georgina on the frequency of 93.7 MHz (channel 229B), with an average effective radiated power (ERP) of 6,780 watts (maximum ERP of 26,000 watts, with an effective height of antenna above average terrain of 56.1 metres).

On October 18, 2019, Torres received approval from the CRTC to increase the average effective radiated power (ERP) from 6,780 to 8,804 watts (maximum ERP from 26,000 to 39,000 watts) and by decreasing the effective height of the antenna above average terrain from 56.1 to 41.6 meters.

Torres originally planned a classic hits/oldies music format for the new station, but launched with country music. The station began on-air testing as K Country 93.7 on October 19, 2020 and officially signed on and went live with shows on October 26, 2020.
