= Cajjmere Wray =

Canadian DJ, producer (active 1993– )

- Cajjmere Wray Press Photo

Background information
- Born: Cajjmere Wray
- Origin: Toronto, Ontario, Canada
- Genres: House, dance, progressive house, electro house, pop, electronic, tribal house
- Occupations: DJ, Producer, Remixer, Artist
- Instruments: Keyboards, Synthesizer, Vocals, Percussion, Flute, Music Sequencer, Drum Machine
- Years active: 1993–Present
- Labels: D'Lish-Us Music, Island Def Jam, Tommy Boy Records, Universal Music, Warner Music, Nervous Records (US), Star 69 Records
- Website: cajjmerewray.com

Cajjmere Wray (a.k.a. CCW) is a Canadian producer, DJ and remixer from Toronto. He is known for a variety of his original and remix productions. He has officially remixed many major recording artists including: Jennifer Lopez, Rihanna, Esthero, Nelly Furtado, Girlicious, Christina Aguilera, Mariah Carey, Deborah Cox, Oscar G, Melanie C and others.

The Grammy Award Winning DJ/Producer Peter Rauhofer helped in discovering Wray, by aiding in his entry onto the music scene in 2005, with Wray's remix of the Kobbe & Austin Leeds single, 'Bodyshaker'. This success helped Wray achieve more accomplishments with other remixes on Rauhofer's Star 69 label. His extended works have been made available on various labels including: Island Def Jam, Tommy Boy Records, Universal Music, and Nervous Records (US). In addition to his musical career, Wray also hosted an evening pop/dance music radio show from the Spring of 2007 to early Winter 2010 on Toronto's PROUD FM.

His musical works have received support by a variety of celebrity DJs around the globe, and have also been supported on various radio stations. His production for Natalia Safran's single "All I Feel Is You" was featured in the 2017 Sony Pictures motion picture Flatliners, starring Elliot Page, Diego Luna, and Nina Dobrev. Cajjmere DJs most frequently at clubs in Los Angeles and Toronto, but he has also toured internationally to destinations including New York City, Mexico, Brazil, Serbia, Italy and others. He has released music under various aliases and pseudonyms including most recently the name 'CCW' for his widely popular remixes of Jennifer Lopez's "On The Floor" ft. Pitbull, Christina Aguilera's "You Lost Me" and Rihanna's "Only Girl (in the world)."

== Select Remixology (official) ==
- "Me De Calor" (Jesus Montanez and Nina Flowers) {queen house music}
- "In The Dark" (Nick Harvey and Lula) {rejoin}
- "Heart Of Stone" (France Joli and Joel Dickinson) {swishcraft}
- "The Flash" (Erick Ibiza and Nina Flowers) {queen house music}
- "Vibe'N" (Mark Demarko & Deep Influence pres Celeda) {relevant}
- "Like A Man" (Isaac Escalante & Xavier Santos ft Alan T) {queen house music}
- "Candy Boy" (Maya Simantov) {indie}
- "Everybody Needs A Man" (Offer Nissim) {offer nissim music}
- "I Like You As A Friend" (Florence K) {universal}
- "Boys Will Be Boys" (Paulina Rubio) {universal Latin}
- "Never Gonna Let You Go" (Esthero) {universal}
- "Heat Of The Night" (Paulina Rubio) {universal Latin}
- "If It Wasn't For Love" (Deborah Cox) {deco}
- "Toes" (Lights) {universal}
- "On The Floor" (Jennifer Lopez) {island}
- "The Worst Part Is Over" (Fantasia) (j records)
- "Imitated Never Duplicated" (Barry Harris) (indie)
- "See The New Hong Kong" (Josie Cotton)
- "San Francisco Is My Disco" (Laura LaRue)
- "Only Girl (in the world)" (Rihanna) {island/def jam}
- "Table Dancer" (Keshia Chanté) (universal)
- "My Boots" (Lights) {universal}
- "Don't Leave Me This Way" (Jully Black) {universal}
- "You Lost Me" (Christina Aguilera) {rca}
- "Forgive What I Said" (Temperance) {hi-bias}
- "Maniac" (Girlicious) {universal}
- "Fuerte" (Nelly Furtado) {universal Latin}
- "You Look Better When I'm Drunk" (The White Tie Affair) {epic}
- "Better Than Her" (Matisse) {jive} (remix by (Barry Harris) and Cajjmere Wray)
- "Each Tear" (Mary J. Blige) {interscope}
- "Til The World Ends" (Britney Spears) {jive/rca}
- "Do You Think About Me" (50 Cent) {interscope}
- "Headlights" (Aleesia) {indie}
- "Girls On The Dancefloor" (Far East Movement) {interscope}
- "Russian Roulette" (Rihanna) {island/def jam}
- "What You Need" (Oscar G) {nervous}
- "Your Love" (Oscar G) {nervous}
- "H.A.T.E.U" (Mariah Carey) {island/def jam}
- "Wish You Love" (Chad Jack & Tim Letteer VS. Fawn) {hades music}
- "Running" (Jully Black) {universal}
- "Why R U" (Amerie) {island/def jam}
- "Wonderful" (Billie Myers) {fruit loop records}
- "Bubble Gum" (Aleesia) {indie}
- "Sabotage" (Kristinia DeBarge) {island/def jam}
- "Obsessed" (Mariah Carey) {island/def jam}
- "You Used To Know" (Andrea Carnell) {curvy}
- "Sunglasses" (Divine Brown) {warner music}
- "Love Alibi" (Divine Brown) {indie}
- "Paparazzi" (Lady Gaga) {interscope/universal}
- "Poison" (Elise Estrada) {rockstar music}
- "Over It" (Addictiv) {urban heat} {produced by cajjmere wray, not a remix}
- "Just Breathe" (Addictiv) {urban heat}
- "Catch Me (I'm Falling) 2009" (Pretty Poison) {chemikal}
- "Finga Lick'n Good" (Jade Starling) (lead vocalist from the group Pretty Poison) {chemikal}
- "I Will Be" (Leona Lewis) {j-records}
- "Right Back To You" (Oscar G) {nervous}
- "Wateva" (Ralph Falcón) {nervous}
- "Sundays At Heaven" (J.Velarde, Luque & Vitti) {Tommy Boy Silver Label}
- "Your Love Still Haunts Me" (Beat Thrillerz ft Elissa) {spg}
- "Beautiful U R" (Deborah Cox) {deco}
- "It's Over Now" (Ultra Naté) {Tommy Boy Silver Label}
- "Scandal" (Ultra Naté) {Tommy Boy Silver Label}
- "And I Try" (Bimbo Jones) {Tommy Boy Silver Label}
- "Because I Love You" (September (singer)) {robbins ent/EMI}
- "Cry For You" (September (singer)) {robbins ent/EMI}
- "You" (Oscar G ft Anne Lise Nicole) {nervous}
- "Love Me" (Offer Nissim) {star 69}
- "Work It -get on top-" (Hector Fonseca) {star 69}
- "Carolyna" (Melanie C) {red girl records}
- "Work" (Size Queen) {star 69}
- "Break U" (Ralph Falcón) {nervous}
- "Until I Stay" (Jully Black) {universal}
- "Amazing" (Mike Cruz ft Celeda) {nervous}
- "7 Day Fool" (Jully Black) {universal}
- "Feel Love 2007" (DJs Rule) {hi-bias}
- "Satisfy" (Altar) {zest folies}
- "U Know U Want It" (Hector Fonseca ft Alan T) {star 69}
- "For Your Love" (Offer Nissim) {star 69}
- "Declaration" (William Umana) {harlequin}
- "Everytime You Move" (Nick Fiorucci) {hi-bias}
- "Be My Boyfriend" (Offer Nissim) {star 69}
- "I Need Someone" (Ralph Falcón) {nervous}
- "Scream" (Starkillers) {star 69}
- "Warm Leatherette" (Club 69 ft Kim Cooper) {star 69}
- "Bodyshaker" (Kobbe & Austin Leeds) {star 69}

== Singles/Remixes Featured On CD Compilations ==
- Beat Thrillerz ft. Elissa - "Your Love Still Haunts Me (Cajjmere Wray Remix)" (Featured on the SPG Music CD Club Hits 2010)
- J.Velarde, Luque & Vitti - "Sundays At Heaven (Cajjmere Wray Remix)" (Featured on the Tommy Boy Silver Label CD Generation Next Mixed By Junior Vasquez)
- Kobbe & Austin Leeds - "Bodyshaker (Cajjmere Wray Peak Hour Dub)" (Featured on the Star 69 Records CD I Love Miami Mixed by Peter Rauhofer)
- Cajjmere Wray - "Biggest Mistake" (Featured on the Star 69 Records CD The Week International Mixed by Peter Rauhofer)
- Cajjmere Wray - "Biggest Mistake" (Featured on the 103.9 PROUD FM/Tommy Boy CD Connected Mixed by Cajjmere Wray)
- Cajjmere Wray - "Naughty Girls" (Featured on the Hi-Bias Records CD Canada's Finest Hour Mixed by Deko-Ze)
- Cajjmere Wray - "Exstacy Queen" (Featured on the Star 69 Records CD NY Club Anthems Vol.2 Mixed by Hector Fonseca)
- Cajjmere Wray - "Misstereee" (Featured on the EMI Records CD Instinct Mixed by Mickey Friedmann)

== Original Productions (D'Lish-Us Music or others) ==
- "Hombres" (Original) (Cajjmere Wray)
- "Mamacita" (Original) (Cajjmere Wray and Nina Flowers)
- "My Strange Things" (Full Length Album) (Cajjmere Wray)
- "Te Quiero Puta" (Original) (Cajjmere Wray)
- "Dreamer" (Original) (Cajjmere Wray and Lula)
- "4P" (Original Club Mix) (Cajjmere Wray) (Commemorative Track For Peter Rauhofer)
- "Tribal Kunt" (Original Club Mix) (Cajjmere Wray ft. Andrea Carnell)
- "I Love Miami" (Vocal Version) (Cajjmere Wray ft. Andrea Godin)
- "I Love Miami" (Original Instrumental Mix) (Cajjmere Wray)
- "In The Night" (Cajjmere Wray)
- "Juicy P*ssy" (Cajjmere Wray vs. Melleefresh)
- "The Music Makes Me Dirty" (Cajjmere Wray)
- "Feeling Pride" (Cajjmere Wray)
- "Dancing On Dark Dancefloors" (Cajjmere Wray)
- "Galaxxxy 2008" (Cajjmere Wray)
- "Sexy Dirrty" (Cajjmere Wray)
- "This Is Stereo" (Cajjmere Wray)
- "Uneed2cum2getha" (Cajjmere Wray)
- "Say It (do it)" (Cajjmere Wray)
- "Orange Hell" (Cajjmere Wray)
- "Biggest Mistake" (Cajjmere Wray ft Sasha)
- "Exstacy Queen" (Haus Of Lies)
- "Sound Is Open" (Paradimm)
- "Misstereee" (Cajjmere Wray)
- "Reach" (The Drumbrats)
- "Fall Down" (Dolce Design)
- "Taste" (Stacie Dycen)
- "Crazy 4 U" (Cajjmere Wray)
- "Work" (Cajjmere Wray)
- "Backroom" (Cajjmere Wray)
- "Janet JDrama" (Cajjmere Wray)
- "Morning" (Cajjmere Wray)
- "Noon" (Cajjmere Wray)
- "Nite" (Cajjmere Wray)
- "2am Freak" (Cajjmere Wray)
- "Who Is He" (Cajjmere Wray)
- "Prance" (Cajjmere Wray)
- "Release!" (Cajjmere Wray)
- "Tra La La" (Cajjmere Wray)
- "Runway" (Cajjmere Wray)
- "Block Party" (Cajjmere Wray)
- "Get This" (Cajjmere Wray)
