= CHOD-FM =

Francophone community radio station in Cornwall, Ontario

Coordinates: 45°03′48″N 74°40′01″W

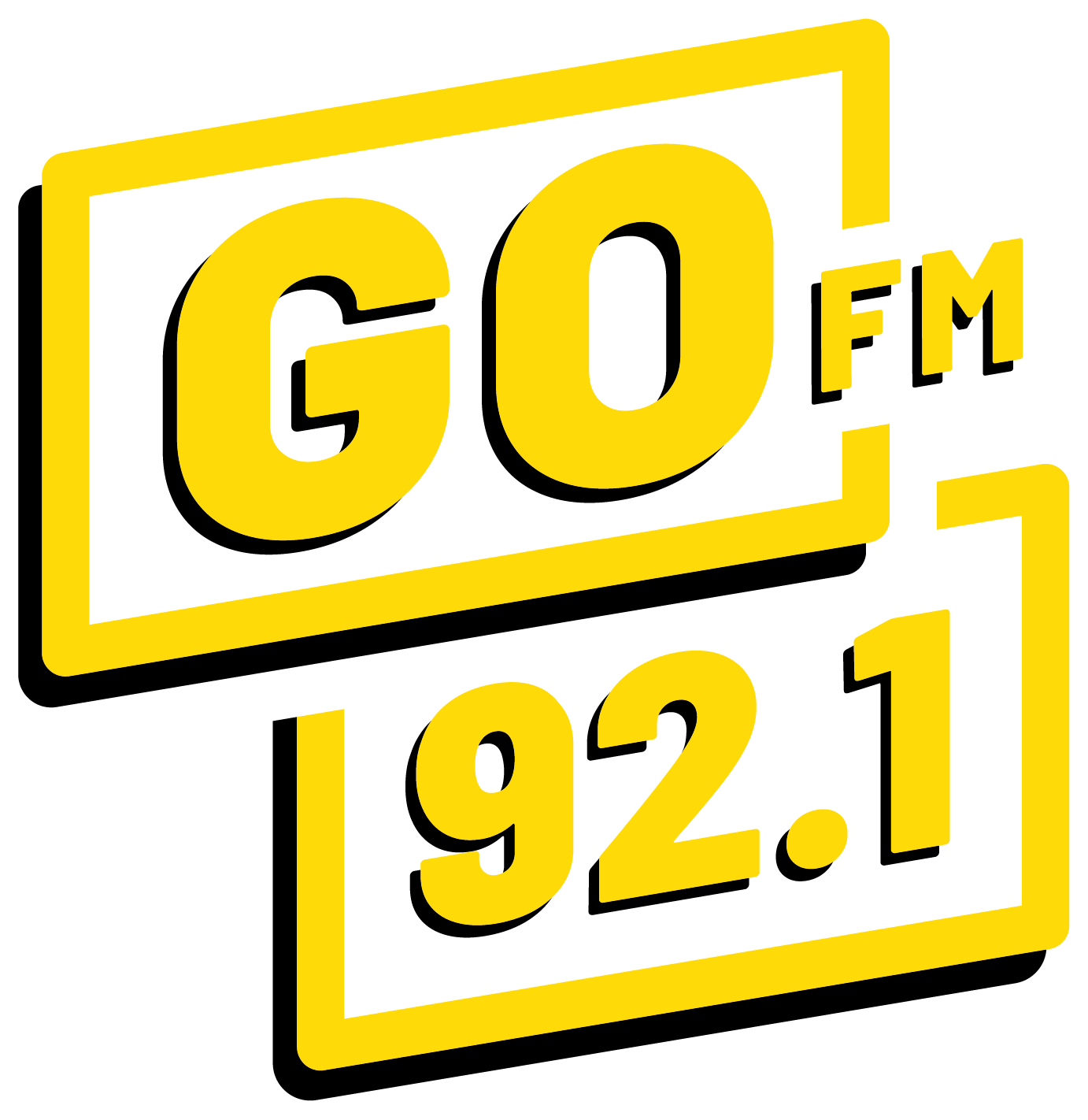
- Cornwall, Ontario; Canada
- Broadcast area: Prescott-Russell, Stormont, Dundas and Glengarry, Cornwall
- Frequency: 92.1 MHz
- Branding: 92.1 GO FM

Programming
- Language: French
- Format: Community radio

Ownership
- Owner: La Radio communautaire Cornwall-Alexandria

History
- First air date: May 1, 1994

Technical information
- Class: B
- ERP: 19.2 kilowatts average 45.6 kilowatts peak
- HAAT: 39 metres (128 ft)

Links
- Website: gofm.ca

CHOD-FM, branded as 92.1 GO FM, is a radio station licensed to Cornwall, Ontario, which currently operates from studios in Casselman. Owned and operated by the Radio communautaire Cornwall-Alexandria cooperative, it is a non-profit community radio station. The station was licensed by the Canadian Radio-television and Telecommunications Commission on February 24, 1993 and officially launched on May 1, 1994.

On March 26, 2012, Radio communautaire Cornwall-Alexandria Inc., received CRTC approval to change the authorized contours of the French-language community radio programming undertaking CHOD-FM Cornwall by increasing the average effective radiated power (ERP) from 19,200 to 34,167 watts (maximum ERP of 45,600 to 60,000 watts), by changing the class from B to C1, by increasing the effective height of antenna above average terrain from 39 to 106.7 metres and by changing the transmission site.

In October 2016, the station's studios moved to Casselman, in order to better serve and expand in all of its territory.

On October 16, 2020, the CRTC approved an application by Radio communautaire to change CHOD-FM's frequency at Cornwall to 91.9 MHz, and by decreasing the maximum effective radiated power (ERP) to 1,000 watts and the average ERP to 420 watts. All other technical parameters were unchanged.

On January 9, 2023, the station became 92.1 GO FM.

In September 2024, the cooperative announced a deal to acquire CHRC-FM in Rockland and CKHK-FM in Hawkesbury from Evanov Communications.

== Rebroadcasters ==
Rebroadcasters of CHOD-FM
City of licence	Identifier	Frequency	RECNet	CRTC Decision
Dunvegan	CHOD-FM-1	92.1 FM	Query	2017-331

On April 18, 2017, Radio communautaire Cornwall-Alexandria Inc. submitted an application to add a new FM transmitter at Dunvegan, Ontario, to rebroadcast the programming of CHOD-FM Cornwall. On September 13, 2017, the CRTC approved Radio Communautaire's application to operate a new transmitter at 92.1 MHz near Dunvegan with a proposed callsign CHOD-FM-1.

== Notes ==
The station is a member of the Alliance des radios communautaires du Canada.

== Former logo ==
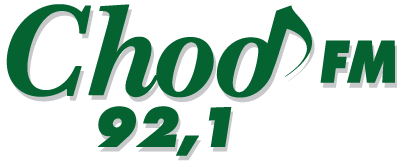
Previous logo used before November 28, 2016
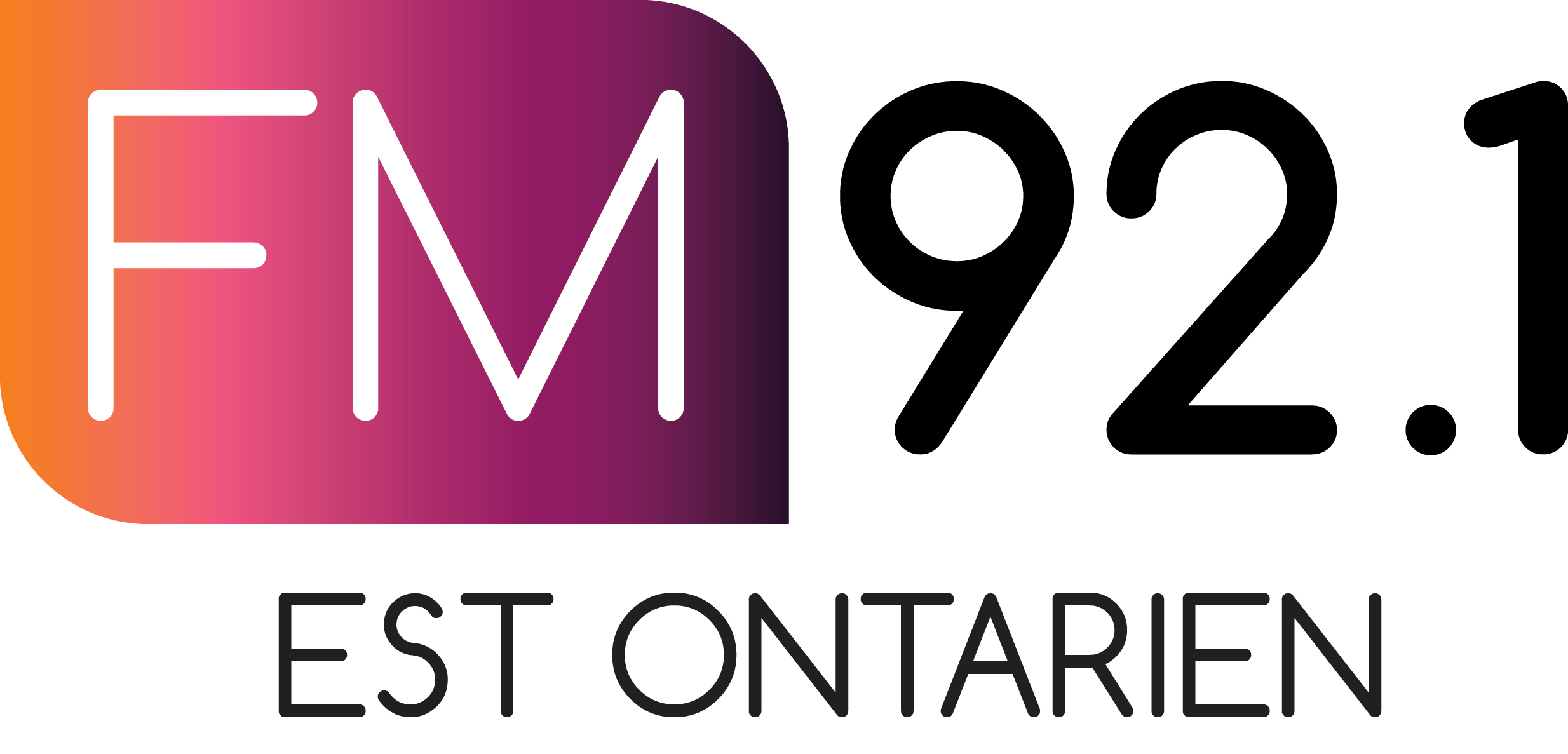
Previous logo used from November 28, 2016, to January 9, 2023
