= Dan Pollard =

Dan Pollard is a Canadian broadcaster from Uxbridge, Ontario.

He first worked for CKLY, and later for TSN, CBC Sports, NHL Network, Sportsnet, and CILQ-FM in Toronto. In 2015, Pollard became an on-air personality for Uxbridge's newly established CIUX-FM.
