= CKOD-FM =

Radio station in Salaberry-de-Valleyfield

Coordinates: 45°16′08″N 74°05′48″W

- Salaberry-de-Valleyfield, Quebec; Canada
- Frequency: 103.1 MHz
- Branding: Max 103

Programming
- Language: French
- Format: Hot adult contemporary

Ownership
- Owner: Torres Media

History
- First air date: 1961
- Former call signs: CFLV (1961–1991)
- Former frequencies: 1370 kHz (1961–1994)

Technical information
- Licensing authority: CRTC
- Class: A
- ERP: 3,000 watts
- HAAT: 51 metres (167 ft)

Links
- Website: www.max103.com

CKOD-FM is a French language Canadian radio station located in Salaberry-de-Valleyfield, Quebec, Canada, approximately 50 kilometres (30 miles) southwest of Montreal. Owned by Torres Media, the station music is a contemporary hits format. The station broadcasts on 103.1 MHz with an effective radiated power of 3,000 watts (class A) using an omnidirectional antenna.

== History ==
Known as CFLV until 1991, the station was on the AM band 1370 kHz from 1961 to 1994, at which point the station moved to FM band on 102.9 MHz. However, strong interference by CITE-FM-1 in Sherbrooke, which broadcasts on the neighbouring frequency of 102.7 MHz from Mount Orford (approximately 170 kilometres, 105 miles east) forced a change to the current 103.1 MHz very shortly after the initial move to FM.

The station was acquired from Radio Express by Torres Media Valleyfield in 2015.
