= Deb Pearce =

Canadian broadcaster and comedian

Deb Pearce is a Canadian broadcaster and comedian, who, in the 2000s, hosted the midday program and then co-hosted the morning program with Patrick Marano on 103.9 Proud FM in Toronto, Ontario. She was previously a host on 92.5 Jack FM. After being let go from Proud FM, she became a host of television programming, including Rogers Television's foQus and OUTtv's Bump!.

An out lesbian, Pearce has previously performed as a drag king.
