= CHIP-FM =

Radio station in Fort-Coulonge, Quebec

Coordinates: 45°45′41″N 76°35′00″W

- Fort-Coulonge, Quebec; Canada
- Frequency: 101.9 MHz

Programming
- Format: Community radio

Ownership
- Owner: La Radio du Pontiac Inc.

History
- First air date: June 1981
- Former frequencies: 101.5 MHz (1981–1993); 101.7 MHz (1993–2016)

Technical information
- ERP: 11.8 kW

Links
- Website: http://www.chipfm.com/

CHIP-FM is a bilingual community radio station that operates at 101.9 FM in Fort-Coulonge, Quebec. The station serves Pontiac County in Quebec and Renfrew County in Ontario.

The station is a member of the Association des radiodiffuseurs communautaires du Québec.

== History ==
On March 20, 1980, La Radio du Pontiac Inc. received approval from the CRTC to operate a new community FM radio station at Fort-Coulonge (101.7 MHz with effective radiated power of 3,000 watts) with rebroadcast transmitters at Chapeau (93.5 MHz with ERP of 150 watts) and Rapide-des-Joachims (94.3 MHz, and ERP of 35 watts).

The station was originally launched in 1981 at 101.5 FM; it moved to 101.7 in 1993.

In June 1981, La Radio du Pontiac Inc. was authorized to change frequencies for CHIP-FM's rebroadcast transmitters, CHIP-FM-1 to 94.5 MHz in Chapeau and CHIP-FM-2 to 107.5 MHz in Rapide-des-Joachims.

In January 1987, CHIP-FM informed the CRTC that the transmitter at Rapide-des-Joachims had never been implemented and that it did not wish to seek renewal for this rebroadcaster.

On February 25, 1994, the licence for CHIP-FM-1 Chapeau was revoked at the owner's request.

CHIP-FM has been owned by La Radio du Pontiac Inc. since its launch in the early 1980s.

=== Move to 101.9 ===
On April 10, 2015, La Radio du Pontiac, and Torres Media Ottawa—owner of Ottawa-based blues station CIDG-FM, both filed requests with the CRTC for CHIP-FM and CIDG-FM to swap frequencies, with CIDG-FM moving to 101.7 and CHIP-FM moving to 101.9. Torres stated that the move would allow CIDG to broadcast at a higher power, with coverage comparable to competing stations in the Ottawa-Gatineau market. This was not possible under the 101.9 frequency due to a requirement to protect stations in neighbouring markets on the same frequency. It was noted that this move would not have a negative impact on CHIP's coverage, and that Torres planned to provide La Radio du Pontiac with additional funding to hire staff and promote the station as compensation for the move. The CRTC approved the applications on December 22, 2015.

On August 30, 2016, at 1:40 pm EDT, CHIP-FM officially moved to its current 101.9 MHz frequency on the FM band.
