= Torres Media =

Canadian radio broadcasting company

- Type: Private
- Founded: 2008; 18 years ago
- Headquarters: Ottawa, Ontario, Canada
- Key people: Edward "Ed" Torres (Co-founder/president)
- Divisions: SkyWords Media
- Website: skywords.ca/torres-media/

Torres Media is a Canadian independent radio broadcasting company that currently own six FM radio stations in Ontario and Quebec.

The company's division and subsidiary SkyWords Media is the largest radio network in the country.

== History ==
Its origins began in 1991, when Ed and his brother Frank Torres founded SkyWords Media and was originally an advertising company. It would later branch out into a radio network providing content like weather and traffic reports across three provinces in the country.

On August 26, 2008, an application for a new station at the time CIDG-FM in Ottawa was awarded to Torres Media, and approved by the CRTC the same day. The station would later begin testing its signal on 101.9 FM on June 1, 2010, and officially launched six days later.

On April 3, 2012, Frank Torres received approval from the Canadian Radio-television and Telecommunications Commission (CRTC) to operate a new station on 105.5 MHz (for CIUX-FM). The station's launch was delayed to 2015 due to several disputes, including Bell Canada briefly opposing the station's co-location on one of its towers, and conflicts with another station owner who objected to the new station.

On May 8, 2015, it was announced that Torres Media would acquire CKOD-FM from Radio Express, Inc. for $250,000; the sale was completed on November 24.

On July 11, 2018, the Canadian Radio-television and Telecommunications Commission (CRTC) approved an application by Frank Torres on behalf of a corporation to be incorporated (OBCI) to operate a new English language radio station at Georgina on the frequency of 93.7 MHz (for CKOU-FM). The station later began testing on October 19, 2020, and officially signed on and went live with shows on October 26, 2020.

On September 19, 2024, Evanov Communications announced that it had reached eleventh-hour agreements to sell all three stations; CJWL-FM was sold to Torres Media for $1.2 million, along with two other stations to a different company. Both groups filed applications for the purchases with the CRTC on January 24, 2025, and operated the stations under temporary management agreements until they were formally approved.

On April 20, 2026, Torres Media announced its intent to acquire CHSV-FM in Hudson and Saint-Lazare, Quebec from Evanov for $300,000. The application was approved on October 14, 2026.

== Radio stations ==
- Georgina, Ontario: CKOU-FM
- Ottawa, Ontario: CIDG-FM, CITM-FM
- Uxbridge, Ontario: CIUX-FM
- Salaberry-de-Valleyfield, Quebec: CKOD-FM
- Hudson–Saint-Lazare, Quebec: CHSV-FM
