= CHRC-FM =

Radio station in Rockland, Ontario

Coordinates: 45°31′27″N 75°17′30″W

- Rockland, Ontario; Canada
- Broadcast area: Clarence-Rockland
- Frequency: 92.5 MHz
- Branding: 92.5 Big FM

Programming
- Format: Adult hits

Ownership
- Owner: Radio communautaire Cornwall-Alexandria; (1001012762 Ontario Inc.)
- Sister stations: CHOD-FM

History
- First air date: October 15, 2013
- Call sign meaning: Rockland and Clarence

Technical information
- Class: A
- ERP: 333 watts
- HAAT: 54.8 metres (180 ft)

Links
- Webcast: Listen Live
- Website: 925bigfm.ca

CHRC-FM (92.5 FM, "92.5 Big FM") is a radio station licensed to Rockland, Ontario. Owned by Radio communautaire Cornwall-Alexandria, it broadcasts an adult hits format serving Clarence-Rockland, Ontario.

== History ==
Former logo as Jewel 92.5

On February 25, 2013, the CRTC approved an application for a new FM radio station in Rockland, Ontario by Dufferin Communications, a subsidiary of Evanov Radio Group. Evanov proposed an adult contemporary station broadcasting on 92.5 FM with an effective radiated power (ERP) of 333 watts. Cogeco and Evanov accepted that there would be a small zone of interference between the new station and CKBE-FM in Montreal.

In June 2013, the station was assigned the call letters CHRC-FM. That call sign was previously used by a now-defunct radio station in Quebec City. On October 15, 2013, CHRC-FM launched with a soft adult contemporary format branded as Jewel 92.5; its lineup featured the syndicated John Tesh Radio Show and nightly blocks of adult standards (The Lounge) and beautiful music (The Instrumental Concert Series).

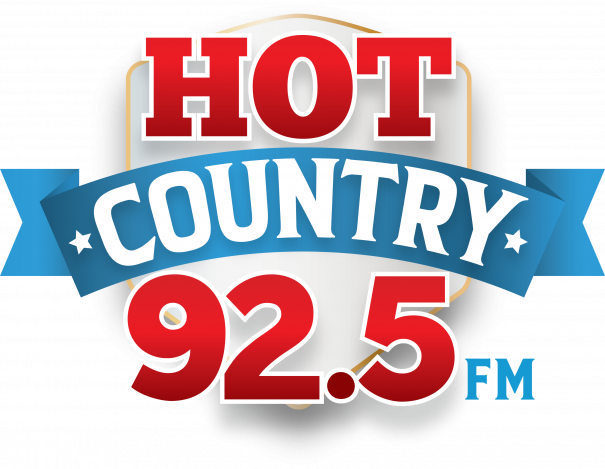
Former logo as Hot Country 92.5

In May 2021, CHRC-FM flipped to country music as Hot Country 92.5.

On September 5, 2024, Evanov announced that the station, along with CJWL-FM in Ottawa and CKHK-FM in Hawkesbury, would close effective September 20, 2024, due to increased competition, changing listener habits, and economic conditions brought upon by the COVID-19 pandemic. However, on September 19, Evanov announced that it had reached agreements to sell all three stations instead, with an agreement to sell CHRC and CKHK to Radio communautaire Cornwall-Alexandria—the cooperative that owns CHOD-FM 92.1 Go FM in Cornwall, pending CRTC approval. While CHOD is a francophone station, it was stated that the stations would still broadcast in English.

Radio communautaire Cornwall-Alexandria formally filed applications to acquire the stations on January 24, 2025, via the subsidiary 1001012762 Ontario Inc., valuing them at $150,000 each. It operated the stations under a temporary management agreement until the sale of the station was approved. On the morning of May 12, 2025, CHRC and CKHK stunted with a loop of "Bye Bye Mon Cowboy" by Quebecois singer Mitsou, before flipping to adult hits at noon as Big FM. The sale was approved by the CRTC on June 30, 2025.
