= CFMB =

Radio station in Montreal, Quebec, Canada

- Montreal, Quebec; Canada
- Broadcast area: Greater Montreal
- Frequency: 1280 kHz
- Branding: CFMB AM 1280

Programming
- Format: Multilingual

Ownership
- Owner: Evanov Communications

History
- First air date: December 21, 1962
- Former frequencies: 1410 kHz (1962–1997)
- Call sign meaning: Canada's First, Montreal's Best or; Canada's First Multilingual Broadcaster

Technical information
- Licensing authority: CRTC
- Class: B (regional)
- Power: 50,000 watts
- Transmitter coordinates: 45°19′31.08″N 73°32′53.16″W

Links
- Webcast: Listen live
- Website: cfmb.ca

CFMB (1280 kHz) is an AM multilingual radio station located in Montreal, Quebec, owned by Evanov Communications. It broadcasts with a power of 50,000 watts full-time as a class B station, using a directional antenna with different patterns day and night (the nighttime pattern being significantly tighter). Its transmitter is located near Saint-Mathieu, while its studios are located on Papineau Avenue, Montreal.

== History ==
CFMB was founded by Casimir Stanczykowski in 1962. From its inception on December 21, 1962 until September 29, 1997, the station broadcast on 1410 kHz. Its move to 1280 kHz was somewhat controversial, as that frequency was previously (until 1994) home to the now-defunct CJMS, a French-language station. Some individuals claimed that this move resulted from an attempt to prevent new competition to CKAC and CKVL, as 1280 kHz was the best AM frequency available in the Montreal area. Others claimed that the Canadian Radio-television and Telecommunications Commission (CRTC) used the opportunity to promote multiculturalism at the expense of integration of immigrants to the French language. Supporters of the decision note that CFMB was due to lose its transmitter site and had already bought the old CJMS site, and that the only other application to use the 1280 kHz frequency was for a station with only 10,000 watts of power.

As of Stanczykowski's death in 1981, the station was owned by CFMB Ltd., which was majority-owned by his widow Anne-Marie Stanczykowski, and her son Stefan Stanczykowski. Station president Andrew Mielewczyk also held a 19.2% stake in the company. The 1410 kHz transmitter was briefly reactivated in 1998, when the station lent it to CJAD, which lost all four of its towers in January's ice storm.

Around the late 1970's to late 1990's, CFMB 1410 use to air the: "Alternative Show" at midnight ending in the morning. It was in english and DJ Mike Biscott use to play: New Wave - Punk - Electronic Music and 80's music. See (Youtube Music Fan Page)

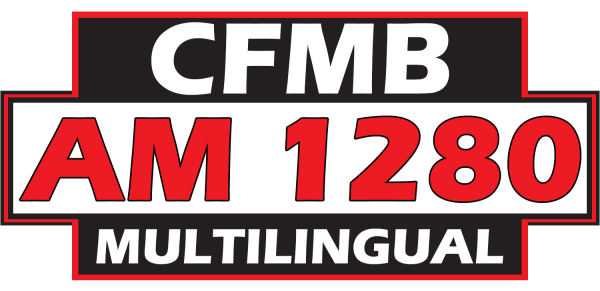
Logo from 2015 to 2021

On November 18, 2014, it was announced that CFMB would be sold to Evanov Communications, pending CRTC approval. The acquisition made CFMB a sister station to Evanov's CHRF, a new French-language radio station whose original intent was to serve Montreal's LGBT community (the format was dropped in December 2015). The sale also united CFMB with CKJS in Winnipeg, another multicultural station that was founded by Stanczykowski. Evanov plans to maintain "synergies" between the two stations and has moved CFMB and CHRF to new studios on Papineau Avenue.

Following the May 31, 2020 closure of sister station CHRF, CFMB began carrying its programs hosted by CHRF's program director Serge Plaisance, as well as hosts Johanne Verdon and Mario Lipari.

== Programming ==
The station has a multilingual format targeting ethnic minorities. Programming is in 14 different languages. Weekdays from 5 am to 6 pm, Italian shows are heard, with Hindi and Punjabi broadcasts on weekday evenings. Nights and weekend feature shows aimed at the Haitian, Filipino, Russian, Polish, Romanian, Ukrainian, Macedonian, Chinese, Portuguese, Greek and Arabic communities. Michael Tellides, Director Hellenic Broadcasting, joined CFMB in 1969 and is now the longest-tenured broadcaster in Quebec.

After being laid off from CKGM, Elliott Price briefly produced an English-language sports radio show for CKGM, Price is Right, beginning February 14, 2016. The program originally aired on Sunday nights; on June 13, 2016, the show switched to weeknights, and in July 2016, was renamed Sportsnet Tonight with Elliot Price as part of a syndication arrangement with the Rogers Media-owned sports network (with the show distributed as a podcast via its digital platforms, and Price becoming a contributor for the Sportsnet Radio stations). The show ended on February 3, 2017, followed by the announcement that he would move to Rogers' flagship sports station CJCL in Toronto to host its morning show.
