= CHRC (AM) =

Former radio station in Quebec City, Quebec

Coordinates: 46°49′51″N 71°14′47″W

- Quebec City, Quebec; Canada
- Broadcast area: Capitale-Nationale
- Frequency: 800 kHz
- Branding: Québec 800

Programming
- Format: news/talk/sports (French)

Ownership
- Owner: Quebec Remparts; (9183-9084 Québec inc.)

History
- First air date: April 1, 1926
- Last air date: September 30, 2012
- Call sign meaning: Radio Capitale

Technical information
- Class: B
- Power: 50 kW

CHRC was a French language radio station located in Quebec City, Quebec, Canada. Known as Québec 800, the station had a news/talk/sports format. Founded in April 1, 1926, it was the oldest station in Quebec City at the time of its shutdown.

Owned and operated by the Quebec Remparts QMJHL franchise, it broadcast on 800 kHz with a power of 50,000 watts as a class B station from a site near the Chaudière River near Saint-Étienne-de-Lauzon in Lévis, using a very directional antenna (six towers) with the same directional pattern day and night to protect various other stations on the same frequency, including CJAD in Montreal (which is approximately 250 kilometres (160 mi) away). The station's studios were located at Colisée Pepsi in Quebec City.

CHRC's logo under Corus ownership, as "Info 800".

It was previously part of the Radiomédia/Corus Québec network, which operated across Quebec.

On August 9, 2007, Corus announced a deal to sell the station to a group of local businessmen, namely Michel Cadrin, Jacques Tanguay and Patrick Roy, owners of the Remparts. The new owners plan on converting the station to a primarily sports-based format. This application was approved by the CRTC on June 26, 2008.

CHRC's alumni include former Premier of Quebec René Lévesque, who was a substitute announcer for CHRC during 1941 and 1942.

CHRC announced it would cease operations at the end of the month of September 2012, at the same time discontinuing the last AM radio service from Quebec City. Sports broadcast rights would soon be transferred to CJMF-FM. CHRC fell silent late in the evening of September 30, 2012. Before leaving the air at 6:06 p.m., the station's final words broadcast were farewell messages from their staff. Parties interested in acquiring 800 included the Tietolman-Tétrault-Pancholy Media group and Bell Media Radio, though no deals were made since the station's closure.

CHRC's programming and document archives were since donated to the Bibliothèque et Archives nationales du Québec.

The CHRC callsign would later be reassigned to a new FM station in Clarence-Rockland, Ontario, as CHRC-FM.
