= CFWC-FM =

Radio station in Brantford, Ontario, Canada

Coordinates: 43°09′05″N 80°16′02″W

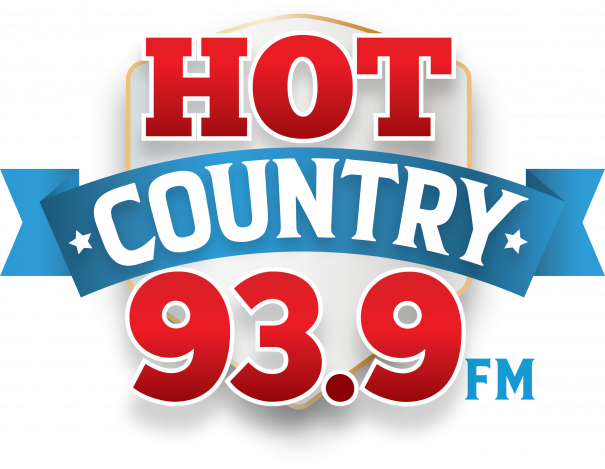
- Brantford, Ontario; Canada
- Broadcast area: Southern Ontario
- Frequency: 93.9 MHz
- Branding: Hot Country 93.9

Programming
- Format: Country
- Affiliations: Premiere Networks

Ownership
- Owner: Evanov Communications
- Sister stations: CKPC-FM

History
- First air date: Early 2002
- Former frequencies: 99.5 MHz (2001–2004)

Technical information
- Class: A
- ERP: 1,483 watts (2,630 watts maximum)
- HAAT: 40 metres (130 ft)
- Repeater: 92.1 CKPC-HD2

Links
- Webcast: Listen Live
- Website: hotcountry939.com

CFWC-FM (93.9 MHz, Hot Country 93.9) is a commercial radio station in Brantford, Ontario. Owned by Evanov Communications, the station broadcasts a country music format. The studios are on West Street at Harris Avenue in Brantford.

CFWC-FM is a Class A FM station with an effective radiated power (ERP) of 1,483 watts (2,630 watts maximum). The transmitter is atop a tower on Edmondson Street near West Street in Brantford.

== History ==
=== Freshwind 99.5 ===
On October 11, 2001, Anthony Schleifer, on behalf of a company to be incorporated, received approval from the Canadian Radio-television and Telecommunications Commission (CRTC) to operate an English-language specialty FM radio station in Brantford. The station's original frequency was 99.5 FM and was branded as Freshwind 99.5 when it began broadcasting in early 2002.

Its transmitter was located atop a church steeple, with its studios and offices at 271 Greenwich Street in Brantford. The station has also been given permission to increase power to 250 watts, but this was not carried out at the time it was granted. It had a Christian radio format.

=== Move to 93.9 FM ===
On May 20, 2004, CFWC-FM was given CRTC approval to change its frequency to 93.9 MHz. It was also permitted to increase its effective radiated power from 50 to 250 watts. The antenna height remained 23.9 metres (78 ft) in height above average terrain (HAAT).

The power increase and taller tower allowed the station to cover not just Brantford but several adjacent communities. When CFWC moved to 93.9 MHz, it adopted the name Power 93.9.

=== Changes in ownership ===
In 2010, Durham Radio filed an application to acquire CFWC, under the condition that the station also be relieved from licensing conditions requiring it to broadcast a religious format. On February 10, 2011, the CRTC denied the application, noting that Durham Radio's request appeared to be an attempt to undermine the normal competitive licensing process.

On June 28, 2012, the CRTC approved the sale of the station to Sound of Faith Broadcasting.

=== Evanov Radio ===
On July 20, 2017, the CRTC approved the sale of the station to Evanov Radio Group. The sale was completed August 31, 2017. The station continued its religious programming and was renamed Arise Brantford 93.9.

In February 2020, the CRTC approved requests by Evanov to move CFWC's religious format to new sister station 1380 CKPC, and increase the station's power from 250 to 1,700 watts. Evanov stated that both stations had been unprofitable for several years, and that moving CKPC's country format to FM would allow it to have a larger audience, and become more competitive with out-of-market stations.

The switch took effect on-air on September 4, 2020, with CWFC flipping to a new country format as Hot Country 93.9. CKPC 1380 remained unprofitable and was shut down on August 4, 2023.
