= CIUX-FM =

Radio station in Uxbridge, Ontario

Coordinates: 44°04′28″N 79°09′53″W

- Uxbridge, Ontario; Canada
- Broadcast area: Eastern Greater Toronto Area
- Frequency: 105.5 MHz
- Branding: 105.5 Hits FM

Programming
- Format: Adult contemporary

Ownership
- Owner: Torres Media; (8237646 Canada, Inc.)

History
- First air date: September 21, 2015
- Call sign meaning: Uxbridge

Technical information
- Licensing authority: CRTC
- ERP: 372 watts (maximum 900 watts)
- HAAT: 139.7 metres (458 ft)

Links
- Webcast: Listen Live
- Website: 1055hitsfm.com

CIUX-FM (105.5 MHz) is a commercial FM radio station in Uxbridge, Ontario, Canada, serving the eastern suburbs of the Greater Toronto area. Owned by Torres Media, it broadcasts an adult contemporary format.

CIUX-FM has an effective radiated power (ERP) of 372 watts, with a maximum of 900 watts.

== History ==
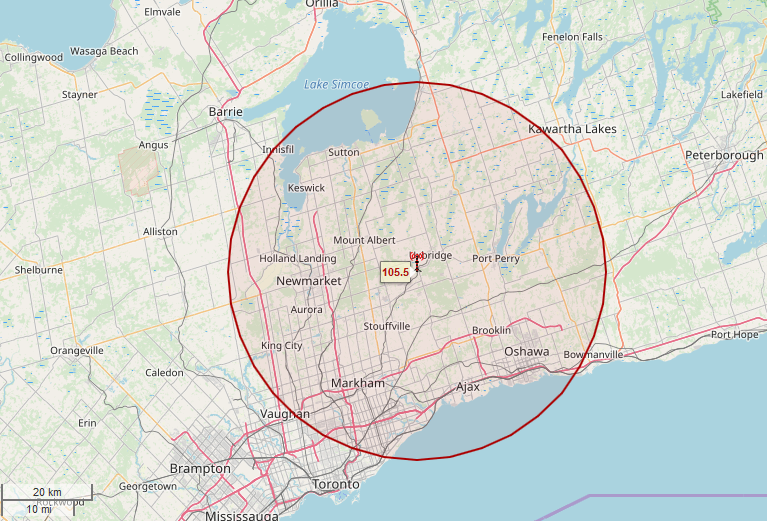
Broadcast area map of the station.

On April 3, 2012, Frank Torres received approval from the Canadian Radio-television and Telecommunications Commission (CRTC) to operate a new station on 105.5 MHz. The applicant indicated that the proposed station would be a first radio service for the community of Uxbridge.

The station's launch was delayed into 2015 by several disputes, including Bell Canada briefly opposing the station's co-location on one of its towers, and conflicts with another station owner who objected to the new station.

The station launched on September 21, 2015 as 105.5 Hits FM. The call sign's last two letters represent UXbridge, its city of license. Veteran broadcaster and Uxbridge native Dan Pollard was hired as an on-air personality, hosting the morning and noon-hour programs.
