= CKHK-FM =

Radio station in Hawkesbury, Ontario

Coordinates: 45°39′24″N 74°39′43″W

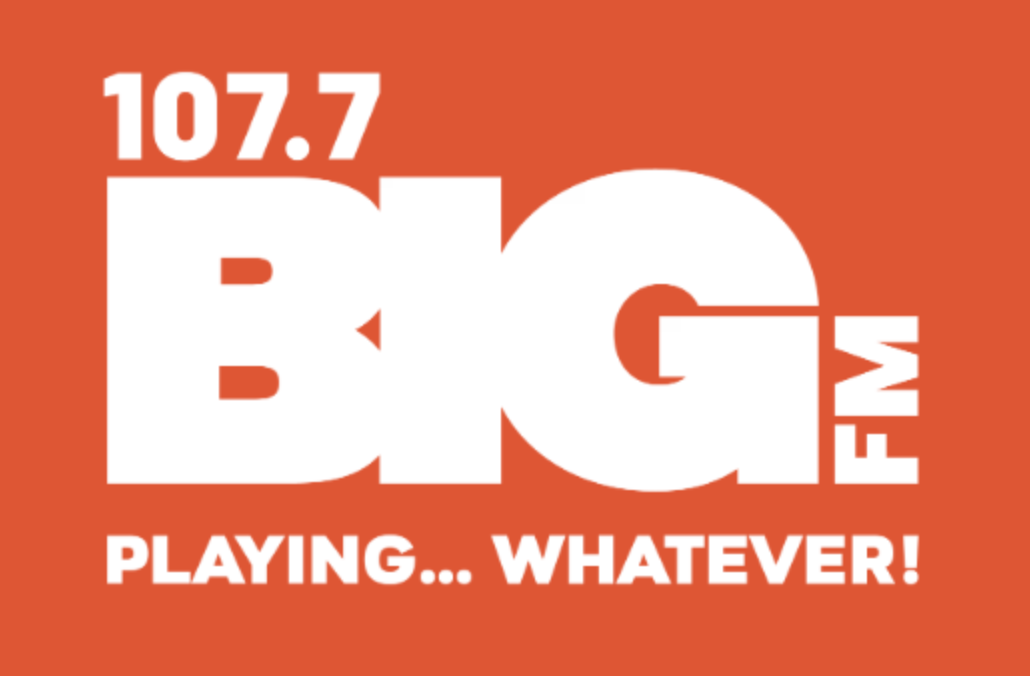
- Hawkesbury, Ontario; Canada
- Frequency: 107.7 MHz
- Branding: 107.7 Big FM

Programming
- Format: Adult hits

Ownership
- Owner: Radio communautaire Cornwall-Alexandria; (1001012762 Ontario Inc.)

History
- First air date: April 14, 2008
- Call sign meaning: Hawkesbury

Technical information
- Class: A
- ERP: 1,100 watts
- HAAT: 71.5 metres (235 ft)

Links
- Webcast: Listen Live
- Website: 1077bigfm.ca

CKHK-FM (107.7 FM, "107.7 Big FM") is a radio station in Hawkesbury, Ontario. Owned by Radio communautaire Cornwall-Alexandria, it broadcasts an adult hits format.

== History ==
On June 27, 2007, Ottawa Media Inc., a subsidiary of Evanov Communications, was licensed by the CRTC to operate a new FM station at Hawkesbury.

On April 14, 2008 at 9:00 AM, the station was launched as 107.7 The Jewel, with a soft adult contemporary format.

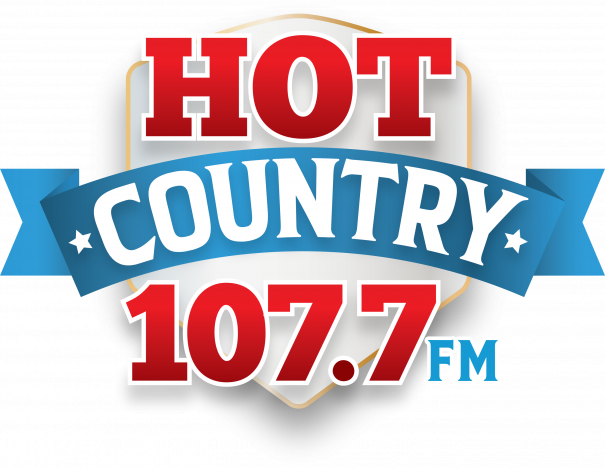
Former logo as Hot Country 107.7

In May 2021, the station flipped to country as Hot Country 107.7, as part of a realignment of several Evanov stations.

On September 5, 2024, Evanov announced that the station, along with CJWL-FM in Ottawa and CHRC-FM in Rockland, would close effective September 20, 2024, due to increased competition, changing listener habits, and economic conditions brought upon by the COVID-19 pandemic. However, on September 19, Evanov announced that it had reached agreements to sell all three stations instead, with an agreement to sell CKHK and CHRC to Radio communautaire Cornwall-Alexandria—the cooperative that owns CHOD-FM 92.1 Go FM in Cornwall—pending CRTC approval. While CHOD is a francophone station, it was stated that both stations would continue to broadcast in English.

Radio communautaire Cornwall-Alexandria formally filed applications to acquire the stations on January 24, 2025, via the subsidiary 1001012762 Ontario Inc., valuing them at $150,000 each. It operated the stations under a temporary management agreement until the sale of the station was approved. On the morning of May 12, 2025, CKHK and CHRC stunted with a loop of "Bye Bye Mon Cowboy" by Quebecois singer Mitsou, before flipping to adult hits at noon as Big FM. The sale was approved by the CRTC on June 30, 2025.
