= CKPC (AM) =

Christian radio station in Brantford, Ontario

- Brantford, Ontario; Canada
- Broadcast area: County of Brant
- Frequency: 1380 kHz
- Branding: Arise Christian Radio AM 1380

Programming
- Format: Christian

Ownership
- Owner: Evanov Communications
- Sister stations: CKPC-FM, CFWC-FM

History
- First air date: December 1923
- Last air date: August 4, 2023
- Former frequencies: 1210 kHz (1923–1930); 1010 kHz (1930–1931); 880 kHz (1931–1934); 930 kHz (1934–1947)
- Call sign meaning: Preston, Canada (original city of licence)

Technical information
- Class: B
- Power: 25,000 watts
- Transmitter coordinates: 43°03′20.2″N 80°18′54″W
- Repeater: 92.1 CKPC-FM-HD3

Links
- Website: arise1380.com

CKPC (1380 kHz) was a commercial AM radio station in Brantford, Ontario. Owned by Evanov Communications, the station was first established in 1923 in Preston, Ontario, as one of Canada's earliest radio stations.

The station broadcast various formats, ranging from full service, to adult contemporary and oldies formats. From 2020 to its closure in 2023, the station operated under a Christian radio format, which it had assumed from sister station CFWC-FM in exchange for its country music format.

== History ==
In December 1923, CKPC signed on the air. The original city of licence was Preston (now part of the city of Cambridge). The station first started out as an amateur radio station, but founder Wallace Russ quickly applied for a broadcast licence after a few trial transmissions. His licence was granted, and he started broadcasting from his home in Preston at a power of just 5 watts. Its power increased to 25 watts in 1927. It moved to 1010 kilocycles at 50 watts in 1930, and then to 880 kHz.

In 1933, Russ's friend Cyrus Dolph purchased the station, which was soon moved from Preston to Brantford. Russ still remained active with the station, and watched it grow throughout its early years. In 1934, the station moved to 930 kHz. In 1947, it moved to its current location on the band, 1380 AM.

The company added an FM station in 1949, CKPC-FM, operating at 250 watts and simulcasting the AM signal. The AM and FM stations continued to mostly air the same programming until 1976, when the FM station's power increased to 50,000 watts.

In 1951, Florence Buchanan assumed full control of Telephone City Broadcast Limited, including CKPC-FM and CKPC, from her father Cyrus. The AM station then had a 1,000-watt signal. She became the first woman in Canada to own and operate a radio station. In 1959, CKPC built a new transmitter and increased power to 10,000 watts. In 1972, Florence's son Richard Buchanan assumed control of Telephone City Broadcast Ltd.

CKPC was an affiliate of CBC Radio's Dominion Network until 1962 when the station became an independent outlet.

In 1980, during a live appearance on a CKPC talk show, Prime Minister Joe Clark revealed that the Canadian government had assisted in the rescue of six American diplomats during the Iran hostage crisis.

On March 15, 1999, Telephone City Broadcast Ltd. was denied an application to add an FM translator at Simcoe to operate on 98.9 MHz with an effective radiated power of 1,090 watts. The proposed rebroadcasting transmitter was intended to correct coverage inadequacies in CKPC's AM signal to the Simcoe, Port Dover and Delhi area.

On June 1, 2004, CKPC switched formats from adult contemporary to oldies. Its power increased from 10,000 watts to 25,000 watts in 2007. Richard Buchanan died in July 2008. Telephone City Broadcast was held by Buchanan's estate until July 2009, when an agreement was reached to sell the stations to Evanov Communications, pending CRTC approval. The transaction was approved on August 28, 2009.

On June 24, 2010, the station flipped to a country format.

In February 2020, the CRTC approved a request by Evanov to move sister station CFWC-FM's Christian format to CKPC. Evanov felt that the country format would be more profitable on an FM signal. The switch took effect on-air on September 4, 2020, with Arise moving to 1380, and CFWC flipping to country as Hot Country 93.9.

Shortly after midnight on August 4, 2023, the station signed off and shut down after nearly 100 years of broadcasting. Evanov cited "local market conditions, and changes to the radio industry" as reasoning, prioritizing the company's FM stations in the market. Its license was returned to the CRTC on December 4, 2023.
