= CIDG-FM =

Radio station in Ottawa

- Ottawa, Ontario; Canada
- Broadcast area: National Capital Region
- Frequency: 101.7 MHz
- Branding: Rebel Rock 101.7

Programming
- Format: Mainstream rock

Ownership
- Owner: Torres Media
- Sister stations: CITM-FM

History
- First air date: June 7, 2010
- Former frequencies: 101.9 MHz (2010–2016)
- Call sign meaning: "Dawg" (former branding)

Technical information
- Licensing authority: CRTC
- Class: B1
- ERP: 4,701 watts (average); 21,000 watts (peak)
- HAAT: 98 metres (322 ft)
- Transmitter coordinates: 45°26′48.1″N 75°37′27.1″W

Links
- Website: rebel1017.com

CIDG-FM (101.7 FM, "Rebel Rock 101.7") is a radio station in Ottawa, Ontario, Canada. Owned by Torres Media, it broadcasts a mainstream rock format serving the National Capital Region. Its studios are located in the business park of St. Laurent Boulevard alongside its sister station CITM-FM, while its transmitter is located atop an apartment tower on Montreal Road East at Bathgate Drive in Gloucester.

== History ==
=== Licensing, blues format ===
The station's application was awarded to Torres Media, and approved by the Canadian Radio-television and Telecommunications Commission on August 26, 2008. The station began testing its signal on 101.9 FM on June 1, 2010, and launched the morning of June 7, 2010. The station originally broadcast a blues and blues-rock format branded as Dawg-FM.

CRTC Commissioner Michel Morin took the unusual step of issuing a dissenting opinion towards the approval of CIDG's licence, in which he stated that Corus Entertainment's competing proposal for a new talk radio station served a greater need in the market. In his dissent, Morin called attention to the fact that very few other radio stations in North America offer a primarily blues-based format, suggesting that there may not be sufficient audience demand to support the station in the long term.

On November 21, 2008, federal Minister of Canadian Heritage and Official Languages James Moore issued a statement calling on the CRTC to review its approval of both CIDG and Astral Media's new classic hits station CJOT-FM. Moore asked the commission to assess whether the francophone population of the Ottawa-Gatineau area was sufficiently well-served by existing French radio services, and to consider licensing one or more of the French language applications, which included a Christian music station, a community radio station and a campus radio station for the Université du Québec en Outaouais, in addition to or instead of the approved stations.

In the resulting round of hearings, Torres proposed that a new francophone station could be licensed on 94.5 FM, although such a station would be second-adjacent to Astral's CIMF-FM. Industry Canada subsequently aired a testing signal on 94.5 in May 2009 to determine whether the signal could be used without affecting CIMF. The test found that the signal could be used without causing significant interference to CIMF, and Astral consequently gave its consent to the use of the frequency as long as the company retained its licence for CJOT. On April 8, 2010, CIDG-FM received approval to decrease its average effective radiated power from 1,300 watts to 934 watts, by increasing the maximum ERP from 3,000 watts to 4,500 watts (effective height of antenna above average terrain of 98 metres), and by relocating the antenna.

=== Move to 101.7, flip to rock ===
CIDG faced difficulties in growing an audience due to the quality of its signal, which was restricted in power in order to protect stations in Cornwall (CJSS-FM) and Kingston (CFRC-FM) on the same frequency (101.9 MHz), as well as listeners being alienated by the hybrid blues/blues-rock format it originally broadcast. Despite these shortcomings, the station did receive praise for helping promote Canadian blues artists.

On April 10, 2015, Torres Media Ottawa and Pontiac Community Radio, the owner of CHIP-FM 101.7 in Fort-Coulonge, Quebec, filed requests with the CRTC for CIDG and CHIP to swap frequencies, resulting in CIDG moving to 101.7 and CHIP moving to 101.9. Torres stated that the move would allow CIDG to increase its power to 19,500 watts, giving it a signal and coverage comparable to other commercial radio stations in the Ottawa-Gatineau market. As a condition of the swap, Torres stated that it would provide Pontiac Community Radio with monetary compensation, which would be used by CHIP to hire additional staff and help advertise the station. The CRTC approved the applications on December 22, 2015.

On July 18, 2016, as part of a licence renewal, the CRTC removed CIDG's obligation to broadcast special interest music, citing that allowing CIDG to broadcast a mainstream format would allow the station to become more competitive and economically viable. As a result, Torres Media announced that alongside the frequency change, it would relaunch CIDG as active rock Rebel 101.7. Co-owner Ed Torres felt that the obligation to broadcast a blues-leaning format made it difficult to run CIDG with a format that could retain viewers. Torres stated that the station's music library would span "a number of decades". The new format would also take advantage of CKQB-FM's recent flip from active rock to contemporary hit radio (CHR) in March 2014. Former CKKL-FM and CKQB personalities Darryl Kornicky and Jason "J-Man" Petrunik also joined the station. The former "Dawg" format was moved to an internet radio station, which will focus primarily on blues material as opposed to the mixture of blues and blues-rock.

The change in format occurred on August 26, 2016; as Torres Media was unable to secure a new transmission site at that time, it continued to broadcast from its existing transmitter site with no change in power, but still relocated to 101.7 as planned. On September 6, 2017, Torres Media received CRTC approval to relocate CIDG-FM's transmission site, changing the transmitter class from A to B1, increasing the effective height of the antenna above average terrain from 98 to 99.6 metres and increasing the average effective radiated power (ERP) from 1,792 to 5,316 watts (maximum ERP from 5,500 to 19,340 watts). On April 8, 2019, Torres Media received approval to increase CIDG-FM's power to 21,000 watts.

On September 2, 2022, after hiring former Rogers Media rock director Danny Kingsbury, CIDG rebranded as Rebel Rock 101.7. With the rebrand, the station began to feature more classic rock material than before (thus segueing to mainstream rock), in an effort to broaden its audience to compete with Rogers' CHEZ-FM.
