= CHSV-FM =

Radio station in Hudson–Saint-Lazare, Quebec

Coordinates: 45°26′36″N 74°09′27″W

- Hudson–Saint-Lazare, Quebec; Canada
- Broadcast area: Vaudreuil-Soulanges Regional County Municipality
- Frequency: 106.7 MHz
- Branding: Lite 106.7

Programming
- Language: English
- Format: Soft adult contemporary

Ownership
- Owner: Torres Media; (9238476 Canada Inc.)

History
- First air date: March 2, 2015
- Call sign meaning: Hudson and Saint-Lazare

Technical information
- Licensing authority: CRTC
- Class: A
- ERP: 1,420 watts average; 2,650 watts peak
- HAAT: 94.5 metres (310 ft)

Links
- Webcast: Listen live
- Website: www.lite1067.ca

CHSV-FM (106.7 FM, Lite 106.7) is a radio station licensed to Hudson and Saint-Lazare, Quebec, Canada. Owned by Torres Media, the station broadcasts a soft adult contemporary format.

== History ==
On January 20, 2012, Evanov announced that Dufferin applied with the Canadian Radio-television and Telecommunications Commission (CRTC) to establish a new Soft AC station in Hudson; the new station would broadcast at 106.7 MHz at 500 watts at 94 metres (308 ft) HAAT. The frequency choice, however, would have conflicted with CKDG-FM's plans to relocate to 106.7, the frequency previously used by an Aboriginal Voices repeater in Montreal; however, on February 6, 2012, CKDG notified the CRTC that they had withdrawn its application for the frequency change, though it was unknown whether or not Evanov's application for the new station had to do with its decision.

On October 19, 2012, Evanov received approval for the new station from the CRTC. The new station would receive the CHSV-FM callsign in February 2013. However, commencement of broadcasting was delayed when Evanov sought CRTC approval of technical changes, which would allow the station to broadcast instead at 1,420 watts (maximum ERP 2,650 watts), on a directional antenna pattern with an EHAAT of 94.5 metres (310 ft), from a new site 5.3 km (3¼ miles) southeast of the original location. The change of the parameters was due to its original site, on a tower owned by Bell Mobility, becoming unsuitable, both technically and economically. In addition, the station received interventions from CJVD-FM in Vaudreuil-Dorion, over competition issues; and CKIN-FM 106.3 Montreal, due to potential second-adjacent interference issues. The application, nevertheless, was approved on September 18, 2014, with Evanov soon announcing that the station would commence broadcasting in the fall of 2014.

Testing of its signal began on November 4, 2014. Reception would generally be limited to the Hudson/Saint-Lazare area, due to co-channel interference in Montreal and areas south from WIZN in Vergennes, Vermont, and first-adjacent interference in Eastern Ontario and the Outaouais region from CKQB-FM (106.9) in Ottawa. However, it was found to be received way further than its main transmission area, in Saint-Jérôme in the Laurentians the signal is well heard in Stereo. The station began regularly scheduled programming on March 9, 2015, using the "Jewel" branding used by many other Evanov stations in the chain.

On May 3, 2021, CHSV rebranded as Lite 106.7; the format is described as an "evolution" of the previous "Jewel" branding, but with a larger focus on music from the 1980s in order to improve its appeal to demographics favoured by advertisers.

On April 20, 2026, Torres Media announced its intent to acquire CHSV from Evanov pending CRTC approval. The application was approved on October 14, 2026.
