= CKDX-FM =

Radio station in Newmarket, Ontario

Coordinates: 44°00′40″N 79°31′08″W

- Newmarket, Ontario; Canada
- Broadcast area: Simcoe County, Greater Toronto Area
- Frequency: 88.5 MHz
- Branding: Hot Country 88.5

Programming
- Format: Country

Ownership
- Owner: Evanov Communications; (CKDX Radio Limited)

History
- First air date: February 28, 1980
- Former frequencies: 1480 kHz (1980–1994)

Technical information
- Class: B
- ERP: 11,300 watts average 30,000 watts peak
- HAAT: 183.5 metres (602 ft)

Links
- Webcast: Listen Live
- Website: hotcountry885.ca

CKDX-FM (88.5 MHz, Hot Country 88.5) is a radio station licensed to Newmarket, Ontario, Canada and serving Simcoe County and the Greater Toronto Area. Owned by Evanov Communications (but with a 30% stake held by outside investors under numbered companies), it broadcasts a country format. CKDX's studios are located at 5312 Dundas Street West in the Eatonville neighbourhood of Etobicoke, Toronto, while its transmitter is located near Aurora.

== History ==
On August 2, 1978, Bradley R. Walker, representing a company to be incorporated, was given approval by the CRTC to operate a new English language AM radio station at Newmarket, Ontario which would operate on the frequency of 1480 kHz with 10,000 watts day and night.

The station was launched on February 28, 1980, as AM 1480 CKAN, broadcasting from 6 a.m. to midnight with a hybrid easy listening/beautiful music format. The station switched to a country format in 1984. In 1986, the station switched to a Top 40 format, and in 1988 the station began broadcasting 24 hours a day.

The station shut down on March 17, 1992, due to financial problems, but would resume broadcasting on May 17 of that year when the problems were resolved. At the time of the shutdown, the station was known as Energy 1480. In December of that year, the station adopted its current CKDX callsign with an oldies/easy listening format. CKDX subsequently moved to the FM dial in 1994, branding itself as The Phoenix. Since moving to FM, the station has gone through several technical changes.

The station went through a number of format changes in the next several years, adopting a dance format again as Power 88.5 (after a brief period as 88.5 The X) on February 21, 1997, at 8 a.m. On July 19, 1999, at 5 p.m., the station returned to country as 88.5 The Kat. On June 1, 2000, at Noon, the station flipped to a format that had never been tried in Canada before: "Rhythmic oldies" as Dancing Oldies 88.5. By 2001, the "Dancing Oldies" format aired throughout the day, while modern dance music was broadcast at night. It was at this point in time that the station became known as Foxy 88.5, The Dance Music Station.

This lasted until January 2002, when it flipped to adult standards while retaining the "Foxy" branding. In April 2007, the station rebranded as 88.5 The Jewel, adopting the "Jewel" branding shortly after the launch of sister station CJWL-FM in Ottawa.

In 2009, after a few years with the adult standards format, and following the flip of CJEZ-FM to classic hits Boom 97.3, the station segued to a soft adult contemporary format while retaining the Jewel brand. The station carried networked adult standards (The Lounge) and beautiful music (Instrumental Concert Series) programs shared with other Jewel stations.

On October 1, 2021, at 7 a.m., CKDX rebranded as Lite 88.5, joining several other former Jewel stations.

On November 17, 2023, at 9 a.m., CKDX returned to country, this time as Hot Country 88.5. The first song under the new format was "Hello Country" by Newmarket native Steven Lee Olsen.
