= CKPC-FM =

Radio station in Brantford, Ontario

Coordinates: 43°15′49″N 80°18′31″W

- Brantford, Ontario; Canada
- Broadcast area: Brant County; Waterloo Region; Hamilton; Niagara Region
- Frequency: 92.1 MHz (FM) (HD Radio)
- Branding: Lite 92

Programming
- Format: Soft adult contemporary
- Subchannels: HD2: dance/CHR (CIDC-FM simulcast)

Ownership
- Owner: Evanov Communications
- Sister stations: CFWC-FM

History
- First air date: 1949
- Former frequencies: 94.7 MHz (1949–1955)
- Call sign meaning: Preston, Canada (original city of licence)

Technical information
- Class: C1
- ERP: 80,000 watts
- HAAT: 230 metres (750 ft)

Links
- Webcast: Listen Live
- Website: lite92.ca

CKPC-FM (92.1 FM, Lite 92) is a commercial radio station in Brantford, Ontario. Owned by Evanov Communications, it broadcasts a soft adult contemporary format, branded as "Southern Ontario's Favourites". The studios are on West Street at Harris Avenue in Brantford.

CKPC-FM is a Class C1 FM station. It has an effective radiated power (ERP) of 80,000 watts, covering not just the Waterloo Region of Southern Ontario but also the Hamilton and Niagara Regions. The transmitter is off McLean School Road near Ontario Highway 24, north of Brantford.

== Target market ==
The station's format is designed to attract and cater to the adult audience aged 35+ in South Western Ontario and is actively rated in both the Hamilton and Kitchener/Waterloo markets. The station is powered by a strong signal, reaching much of the population of Southern and Southwestern Ontario.. CKPC-FM provides relevant news, traffic reports and regional advertising.

The station is available on-line via streaming, on services such as Streema, Online Radio Box, Radio Canada Online and iHeartRadio.

== History ==
- 1933 - Cyrus Dolph begins to operate an AM radio station in Preston (Cambridge), purchased from Wallace Russ, after it had operated as an amateur radio station since 1923
- 1934 - CKPC moves to 930 kHz on the AM dial, moving to 1380 kHz in 1935
- 1936 - Power increases to 100 watts; now in Brantford, it operates as Telephone City Broadcast Ltd.
- 1947 - CKPC applies for an FM licence
- 1949 - CKPC-FM begins broadcasting at 94.7 FM at 250 watts, simulcasting CKPC.
- 1951 - Florence Dolph Buchanan, among the first women in broadcasting (and the first woman in Canada to own/operate a radio station), takes full control of the station, now with a 1,000–watt signal, from her father Cyrus
- 1955 - CKPC-FM changes frequency to 92.1 MHz; slogan for both AM and FM stations is "The Established Voice of Industrial Ontario"
- 1959 - Signal increases to 10,000 watts
- 1962 - CKPC-FM introduces some original programming, independent of CKPC (AM)
- 1971 - CKPC-FM becomes completely independent, with all original programming
- 1972 - Richard Buchanan purchases Telephone City Broadcast Ltd. from his mother
- 1976 - Signal increases to 50,000 watts
- 2008 - Signal increases to 80,000 watts;
- 2008 - Richard Buchanan July 29 loses battle with cancer
- 2009 - Telephone City Broadcast Limited is purchased by Evanov Communications
- 2009 - Station name changed from FM 92.1 to The New 92; format moves from hot adult contemporary to adult contemporary
- 2010 - Station rebrands as The Jewel or Jewel 92, playing "the best current hits, recent favourites, and timeless classics".
- 2021 - In June, CKPC-FM dropped its Jewel 92 branding and rebranded the station as Lite 92 - "Southern Ontario's Lite Favorites", previously "Lite Favourites".

== Logo ==
CKPC-FM logo used 2010-2021

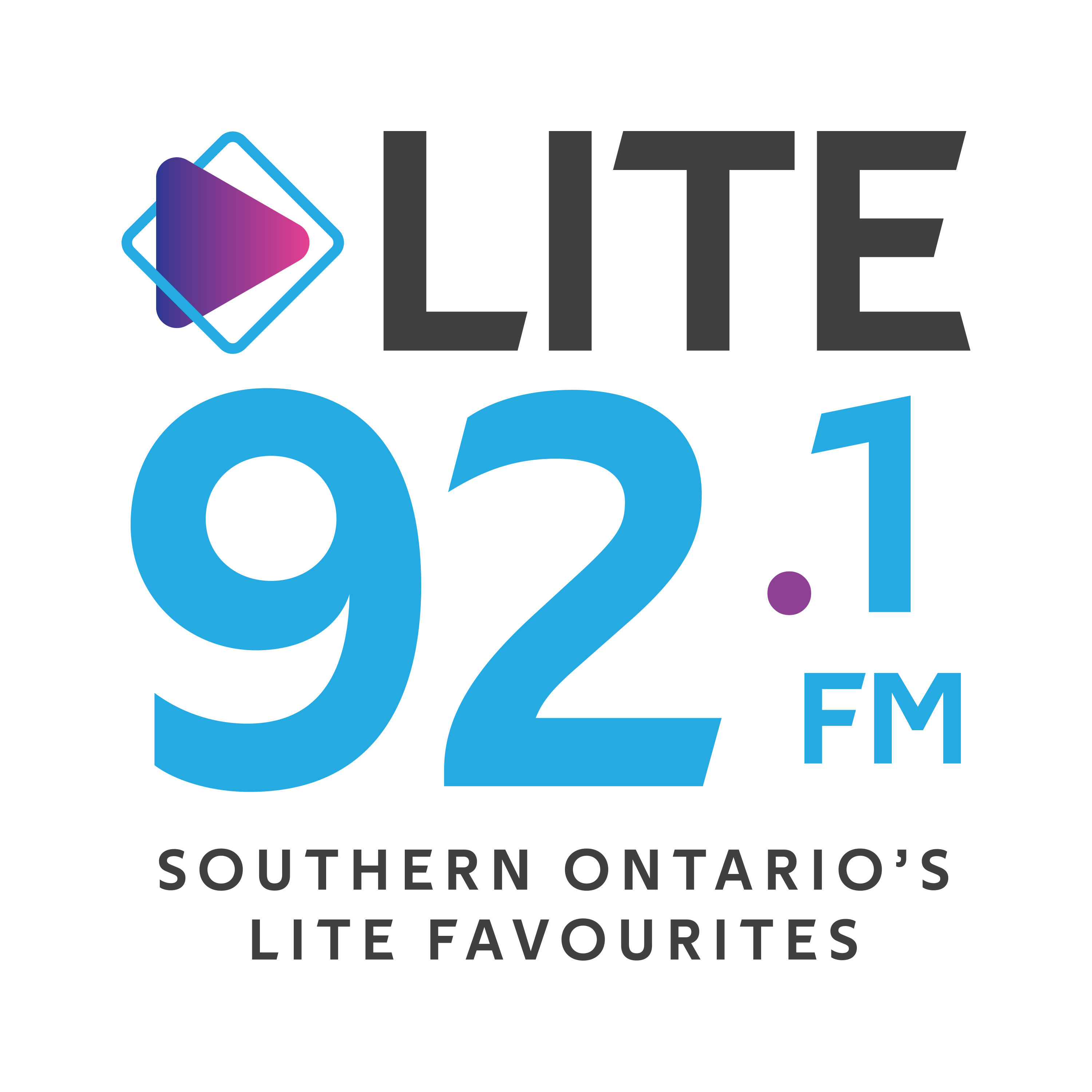
CKPC-FM logo used 2022-Present

== HD Radio ==
On November 18, 2019, CKPC-FM launched HD Radio multi-casting services. The HD1 sub-channel carries the same programming as the standard analog frequency. As of September 4, 2020, the HD2 sub-channel carries a simulcast of sister station CFWC-FM, the HD3 sub-channel carried a simulcast of CKPC (AM) until the station was closed in August 2023. As of October 2026, the HD2 sub-channel carries a simulcast of sister station CIDC-FM.
