= Duff Roblin Provincial Park =

Provincial park in Manitoba, Canada

- IUCN category V (protected landscape/seascape)
- Location within Manitoba
- Interactive map of Duff Roblin Provincial Park
- Location: Manitoba, Canada
- Nearest city: Winnipeg, Manitoba
- Coordinates: 49.7548°N 97.1334°W
- Area: .56 km^{2} (0.22 sq mi)
- Established: June 13, 2008
- Governing body: Government of Manitoba

Duff Roblin Provincial Park was designated a provincial park by the Government of Manitoba in 2008 for a way to celebrate two major accomplishments of former Premier Duff Roblin, the creation of the provincial park system and the Red River Floodway. The park is 56 hectares (0.22 sq mi) in size and is located in St. Norbert by the inlet control gate for the Red River Floodway. The main attractions of the park is a viewing platform of the surrounding area and outdoor recreational facilities.

== Description ==
The park straddles the Red River at the southern Red River Floodway inlet control structure, south of St. Norbert, Winnipeg. Courchaine Road runs through the park from Turnbull drive to St. Mary's Road, acting as its point of entry. The park's land is divided into two different sections with areas either being dedicated to heritage or access. The designated heritage areas, which accounts for 56 per cent of the park, are for recreation and areas to view the Floodway. Access areas, which accounts for 44 per cent of the park, acts as area to host a communication tower and transmission lines as well as an excavation area to provide excavation material for sealing off the Z-Dike at Pembina Highway. The park does not include the actual Floodway inlet control gate which doubles as a bridge over the Red River.

The park is considered to be a Class V protected area under the IUCN protected area management categories.

The most developed part of the park is on the north east bank of the Red River where a large ramp and viewing platform has been built. The ramp is built out of steel sheet pile; heavy sheets of interlocking steel sheets that can be used to build walls used to hold back water. Along the base of the ramp and on the ramp itself are informational plaques about two of Duff Roblin major accomplishments, creating the provincial park system in Manitoba and the creation of the Floodway. A decommissioned track bulldozer from the 1960s is displayed as an example of the machinery which was used to move the 100 million cubic yards of soil in the construction of the Floodway. At the top of the ramp is a panoramic viewing platform with a view of the river, inlet control centre, and the Floodway. The floor of the platform has a map built with coloured concrete centred on the park, showing an outline of the city limits of Winnipeg, the Assiniboine River and Red River, and the path of the Floodway around the city. The map is correctly orientated with the four cardinal directions displayed around the circle acting both as a legend for the map and an indication of direction for the observer. In the centre of the viewing platform an original piston from the Floodway gates is fixed as a central pillar. This area also has a picnic area and public washrooms.

During the construction of the inlet control structure the work site was dewatered through constructing cofferdams and the Red River was diverted with a temporary diversion channel. Part of the channel is inside of the park's border and fills with water when the river level is high enough. The calm waters, shallow bank, and near by parking has made this a popular fishing spot along with other parts of the river bank in the park.

The park acts as the starting point of the modern Crow Wing Trail and the Duff Roblin Parkway Trail which are popular especially with cyclists.

== Development ==
The parks creation was announced in 2007 to relocate the Duff Roblin Park Reserve that ran along a northern section Winnipeg's perimeter highway nearby the Floodway and to provide a place for recreation. The park was funded with $3.2 million from the Province of Manitoba, who provided $2.5 million and the Government of Canada, who provided $700 000. The park would go on to be established on June 13, 2008. Plans were developed for creating amenities and a tower with a viewing platform at the park but no substantial development happened. In 2019 the province announced $2 million of funding to build the viewing platform and interpretive exhibits that exists there today. The new park features officially opened on October 22, 2020 as a part of celebrating Manitoba's 150th anniversary.

== See also ==
- List of protected areas of Manitoba
- Dufferin "Duff" Roblin
