= Adult standards =

Radio format focused on traditional pop and easy listening music

Adult standards (also sometimes known as the nostalgia or Big Band format) is a North American radio format heard primarily on AM or class A FM stations.

Adult standards started in the 1950s and is aimed at "mature" adults, meaning mainly those people over 50 years of age, but it is mostly targeted for senior citizens. It is primarily on AM because market research reveals that only persons in that age group listen to music on AM in sizable numbers. Adult standards first became a popular format in the late 1970s and early 1980s as a way to reach mature adults who came of age before the rock era but were perhaps too mature for adult contemporary radio or too young for beautiful music or MOR stations. A typical adult standards playlist includes traditional pop music by artists such as Frank Sinatra and Tony Bennett, some easy listening numbers from Roger Whittaker and others, and softer tunes from the oldies and adult contemporary music formats.

As originally conceived, the format features big band music, particularly from the 1940s and 1950s, though most modern stations eschew that genre. Younger artists who record in the big-band era style, such as Harry Connick Jr., or Diana Krall, may be played as well. The term "standards" in the format's title is a reference to the standard, a song that is covered extensively by many artists over a prolonged period of time; adult standards may play true standards but are not limited to them.

According to Nielsen Audio, there were 129 stations with adult standards/MOR as format in 2016. Because the adult standards audience has increased in age to the point where many of its listeners have either died or are no longer attractive to advertisers, the format as it is known today (much like the contemporary decline of oldies and smooth jazz formats, along with the earlier demise of easy listening) is likely to die out. Most independently programmed former adult standards stations have transitioned to other formats such as oldies, classic hits, or adult contemporary music that have similar music but skew toward more modern songs.

The Christmas music radio format is an offshoot of adult standards; the first stations to adopt the format in the 1990s were adult standards stations, and stations that adopt the all-Christmas music format continue to favor core adult standards artists regardless of their standard format.

== Satellite delivered formats ==
Only about a handful of adult standards stations today are live and locally programmed around-the-clock. Many have affiliated with nationally distributed satellite formats to cut costs; due to advertiser perceptions about the audiences these stations primarily target, a large number of adult standards stations have trouble selling airtime to advertisers, which makes them unprofitable. For example, KIXI 880 AM, serving the Seattle market and KKIN 930 AM, serving Aitkin, terminated its local airstaff to affiliate with the Music of Your Life network. Many others have simply dumped the format altogether, often for all-talk or all-sports formats, oldies, or other formats deemed by management more profitable than standards.

Music of Your Life is an adult standards format that probably more than any other source defined the format. Music of Your Life, was founded by Al Ham in 1978 and boasts a roster of well-known personalities including Peter Marshall, Steve March-Torme, son of the legendary crooner, Mel Tormé, big band leader Les Brown Jr., radio veteran Al Hardee, Lorri Hafer, daughter of founder Al Ham, and weekend host Pat Boone. Following an internal shakeup in 2008, business developer, Marc Angell took over the fledgling network and moved the company's broadcasting operations to Denver, Colorado, under a distribution deal with Clear Channel Satellite. Music of Your Life is currently distributed by Music of Your Life, Inc. a publicly traded company listed on the OTC markets under the ticker symbol, MYLI, and is distributed to AM, FM, and HD radio stations using the Barix system.

Dial Global (formerly part of Westwood One) has an adult standards format distributed via satellite; Dial Global's is called "Adult Standards" (known on-air as "America's Best Music"). Prior to 2010, ABC distributed Stardust/Timeless Classics/Timeless. Stardust/Timeless Classics was consolidated with a middle-of-the-road format owned by ABC—Unforgettable Favorites/Memories—in 2006, creating Timeless. Westwood One originally called its format AM Only and for a time, as the name suggests, offered the format only to AM stations; today, a handful of FM stations also air Westwood One's format.

While Music of Your Life has not eliminated all of the big-band and traditional pop music from its playlist, Westwood One and ABC dropped much of the older music in favor of softer pop and rock oldies from the 1960s and 1970s top 40 era and a good deal of soft AC material as well. Under Dial Global, some of the older-style songs are making a comeback on the Westwood One format. ABC discontinued its Timeless service early in 2010; that same year, Music of Your Life added more 1960s oldies to its playlist.

iHeartMedia's Format Lab also features at least two adult standards formats.

== Adult standards terrestrial stations ==
Some noteworthy AM & FM radio stations featuring the adult standards format today include:

Call sign	Frequency	City of License	Additional Notes
CFZM	740 AM	Toronto, Ontario	Believed to be the only remaining adult standards-formatted station in North America broadcasting on a 50,000-watt clear channel signal. Selections are announced on air. Has a strong international following.
CJNU-FM	93.7 FM	Winnipeg, Manitoba	
CJWL-FM	98.5 FM	Ottawa, Ontario	The "Jewel"-branded stations have recently moved more toward Soft AC and identify with the moniker "Refreshing Lite Hits." However, traditional Standards are still played at night.
CKDX-FM	88.5 FM	Newmarket, Ontario	The "Jewel"-branded stations have recently moved more toward Soft AC and identify with the moniker "Refreshing Lite Hits." However, traditional Standards are still played at night.
CKHK-FM	107.7 FM	Hawkesbury, Ontario	The "Jewel"-branded stations have recently moved more toward Soft AC and identify with the moniker "Refreshing Lite Hits." However, traditional Standards are still played at night.
CKPC-FM	92.1 FM	Brantford, Ontario	The "Jewel"-branded stations have recently moved more toward Soft AC and identify with the moniker "Refreshing Lite Hits." However, traditional Standards are still played at night.
KAHL	107.9 FM 1310 AM	San Antonio, Texas	KAHL Radio broadcasts adult standards on 107.9 FM, as well as 105.9 FM, 100.7 FM, and 1310 AM in the San Antonio area.
KDKK	97.5 FM	Park Rapids, Minnesota	
KKIN	930 AM	Aitkin, Minnesota	Since August 4, 2014, the station has switched to a sports format with a syndication of NBC Sports Radio. Since August 1, 2017, the station has returned to the adult standards format once again.
KIXI	880 AM	Seattle, Washington	50 kW daytime, 10 kW nights.
KJIM; K267CB	1500 AM; 101.3 FM	Sherman, Texas	The station is owned by Bob Mark Allen Productions, Inc. and is an affiliate of CBS News Radio, NOAA Weather Radio, Westwood One, and America's Best Music. As of 2021, the station had partially leaned into a formula of Soft AC/Gold-based AC, but still remains its Adult Standards format.
KQLH-LP	92.5 LPFM	Yucaipa, California	KQLH-LP (92.5 FM) is a low-power FM radio station branded as "Studio 92.5 FM". The station is operated by Arrowhead Radio Alliance of the Inland Empire broadcasting an Adult Standards Nostalgia Oldies music format. This station is licensed in Yucaipa, California. It can also be heard on Alex and online at MyKQLH.com
KWXY	1340 AM; 92.3FM	Palm Springs, California	
KZQX	100.3 FM	Tatum, Texas	
WABF	1480 AM	Mobile, Alabama	
WBNJ	91.9 FM	Barnegat, New Jersey	
WEBR	1440 AM	Niagara Falls, New York	Adopted the format in 2020. A revival of a station with the same call sign and format previously used on what is now WDCZ from 1924 to 1993. Shifted to a more MOR-influenced playlist in 2021 but retains a traditional standards format on weekends.
WJEJ	1240 AM	Hagerstown, Maryland	
WJIB	740 AM	Cambridge/Boston, Massachusetts	"The Memories Station", Bob Bittner, Owner
WKHR	91.5 FM	Bainbridge, Ohio	Owned by the Kenston Local School District and programmed by both community volunteers and Kenston High School students
WLEC	1450 AM	Sandusky, Ohio	Airs Dial Global Local's The Lounge format
WLHC	103.1 FM	Sanford, North Carolina	
WMBS	590 AM	Uniontown, Pennsylvania	
WRIV	1390 AM	Riverhead, New York	
WTLO	1480 AM	Somerset, Kentucky	Since 1958, WTLO has stood for "We're The Local Ones" and prides itself on a live "Buy/Sell/Trade" show airing Monday through Saturday, and playing Adult Standards throughout the day.
KJZY	93.7 FM	Santa Rosa, CA	The Greatest Songs Of All Time. Sinatra, Bennett, Ella

== Satellite radio ==
Moving into the 21st century, adult standards have been given a lift as a format by new media, such as:

- Sirius XM Channel 5, The 50s on 5, playing some older pre-rock-and-roll-era music along with some newer rock-and-roll hits from the late 1950s and early 1960s.
- Sirius XM Radio 70, Siriusly Sinatra (formerly entitled Standard Time before February 2007)
- XM Satellite Radio 40s Junction, XM Satellite Radio Channel 73

== See also ==
- Adult contemporary music
- Beautiful music
- Middle of the road
- Pop standards
- Traditional pop
