= List of radio stations in Ontario =

The following is a list of radio stations in the Canadian province of Ontario, as of 2025.

Note that stations are listed by their legal community of licence, which in some cases may not be the city where studios and/or transmitter are. (For instance, some stations which target Toronto, such as CFNY-FM and CIDC-FM, are officially licensed to outlying communities in the Greater Toronto Area rather than the city itself.)

== List of radio stations ==
AM/FM

Call sign	Frequency	City of licence	Owner	Format
CJKX-FM	95.9 FM	Ajax	Durham Radio	country
CKON-FM	97.3 FM	Akwesasne	Akwesasne Communication Society	First Nations community radio
CFOA-FM	102.7 FM	Algonquin Park	Friends of Algonquin Park	tourist/park information
CIMA-FM	92.1 FM	Alliston	Local Radio Lab Inc.	adult contemporary
CKBG-FM	107.9 FM	Amherstburg	Amherstburg Broadcasting Corporation	adult contemporary
CFSH-FM	92.9 FM	Apsley	Apsley Community Chapel	Christian radio
CBQT-FM-2	91.3 FM	Armstrong	CBC Radio One	public news/talk
CFMP-FM	107.7 FM	Arnprior	My Broadcasting Corporation	classic hits
CKTE-FM	89.9 FM	Aroland	Aroland Community Radio	First Nations community radio
CBQI-FM	90.1 FM	Atikokan	CBC Radio One	public news/talk
CKAX-FM	91.1 FM	Atikokan	Town of Atikokan	tourist information
CKPR-FM-2	93.5 FM	Atikokan	Dougall Media	adult contemporary
CFOB-FM-1	95.9 FM	Atikokan	Northwoods Broadcasting	classic hits
CKMT-FM	89.9 FM	Attawapiskat	Wawatay	First Nations community radio
CBCA-FM	101.5 FM	Attawapiskat	CBC Radio One	public news/talk
CJBA-FM	107.1 FM	Attawapiskat		community radio
CHPD-FM	105.9 FM	Aylmer	Aylmer and area Inter-Mennonite Community Council	Mennonite community radio (German)
CHMS-FM	97.7 FM	Bancroft	Vista Broadcast Group	variety hits
CBLA-FM-5	99.3 FM	Bancroft	CBC Radio One	public news/talk
CKJJ-FM-4	103.5 FM	Bancroft	United Christian Broadcasters Canada	Christian radio
CHAY-FM	93.1 FM	Barrie	Corus Entertainment	hot adult contemporary
CFJB-FM	95.7 FM	Barrie	Rock 95 Broadcasting	active rock
CKEY-FM	98.5 FM	Barrie	Douglas George Edwards	tourist information
CJLF-FM	100.3 FM	Barrie	Trust Communications	Christian radio
CIQB-FM	101.1 FM	Barrie	Corus Entertainment	classic rock
CFRH-FM-1	106.7 FM	Barrie	Radio Huronie	community radio (French)
CKMB-FM	107.5 FM	Barrie	Rock 95 Broadcasting	hot adult contemporary
CHBY-FM	106.5 FM	Barry's Bay	Vista Broadcast Group	variety hits
CBLE	1240 AM	Beardmore	CBC Radio One	public news/talk
CFNO-FM-3	107.1 FM	Beardmore	Dougall Media	adult contemporary
CFBL-FM	90.1 FM	Bearskin Lake	Wawatay	First Nations community radio
CIDE-FM-1	91.9 FM	Bearskin Lake	Wawatay	First Nations community radio
CJBQ	800 AM	Belleville	Quinte Broadcasting	full service/variety
CBO-FM-1	90.3 FM	Belleville	CBC Radio One	public news/talk
CJLX-FM	91.3 FM	Belleville	Loyalist College	campus radio
CJBC-1-FM	94.3 FM	Belleville	Ici Radio-Canada Première	public news/talk (French)
CJOJ-FM	95.5 FM	Belleville	Starboard Communications	classic hits
CIGL-FM	97.1 FM	Belleville	Quinte Broadcasting	hot adult contemporary
CHCQ-FM	100.1 FM	Belleville	Starboard Communications	country
CKJJ-FM	102.3 FM	Belleville	United Christian Broadcasters Canada	Christian radio
CIDE-FM-2	91.9 FM	Big Trout Lake	Wawatay	First Nations community radio
CFTL-FM	100.3 FM	Big Trout Lake	Ayamowin Communications Society	First Nations community radio
CBON-FM-6	98.5 FM	Blind River	Ici Radio-Canada Première	public news/talk (French)
CIBU-FM-1	91.7 FM	Bluewater	Blackburn Radio	active rock
CJFB-FM	102.7 FM	Bolton	Local Radio Lab Inc.	adult contemporary
CIIG-FM	98.3 FM	Bracebridge/ Gravenhurst	Instant Information Services	tourist information
CFBG-FM	99.5 FM	Bracebridge	Vista Broadcast Group	hot adult contemporary
CJMU-FM	102.3 FM	Bracebridge/ Gravenhurst	Bayshore Broadcasting	country
CHLO	530 AM	Brampton	Evanov Communications	multilingual
CIRF	1350 AM	Brampton	Radio Humsafar	multilingual
CFNY-FM	102.1 FM	Brampton	Corus Entertainment	modern rock
CKPC-FM	92.1 FM	Brantford	Evanov Communications	adult contemporary
CFWC-FM	93.9 FM	Brantford	Evanov Communications	country
CIYM-FM	100.9 FM	Brighton	My Broadcasting Corporation	classic hits
CBEZ-FM	107.7 FM	Britt	CBC Radio One	public news/talk
CBOB-FM	91.9 FM	Brockville	CBC Radio One	public news/talk
CKJJ-FM-2	99.9 FM	Brockville	United Christian Broadcasters Canada	Christian radio
CBOF-FM-7	102.1 FM	Brockville	Ici Radio-Canada Première	public news/talk (French)
CJPT-FM	103.7 FM	Brockville	My Broadcasting Corporation	classic rock
CFJR-FM	104.9 FM	Brockville	My Broadcasting Corporation	adult contemporary
CHEE-FM	89.9 FM	Bruce Peninsula	Vamplew Electronics	tourist information
CJXY-FM	107.9 FM	Burlington	Corus Entertainment	active rock
CHTG-FM	92.9 FM	Caledonia	Durham Radio	classic hits
CJDV-FM	107.5 FM	Cambridge	Corus Entertainment	active rock
CKOL-FM	93.7 FM	Campbellford	Campbellford Area Radio Association	community radio
CJRO-FM	107.7 FM	Carlsbad Springs	Carlsbad Springs Community Association	community radio (English and French)
CJRO-FM-4	96.3 FM	Casselman	Carlsbad Springs Community Association	community radio (English and French) Moving to 96.3 FM; approved December 16, 2025
CJPS-FM	89.9 FM	Cat Lake	Wawatay	First Nations community radio
CIDE-FM-3	91.9 FM	Cat Lake	Wawatay	First Nations community radio
CICW-FM	101.1 FM	Centre Wellington	Centre Wellington Community Radio	community radio
CBCU-FM	89.9 FM	Chapleau	CBC Radio One	public news/talk
CBON-FM-28	91.9 FM	Chapleau	Ici Radio-Canada Première	public news/talk (French)
CFJW-FM	93.7 FM	Chapleau	Allan Pellow	emergency broadcast system
CHAP-FM	95.9 FM	Chapleau	Formation Plus	community-owned rebroadcaster of CHYC-FM Sudbury (French)
CJWA-FM-1	100.7 FM	Chapleau	Labbe Media	adult contemporary
CBEE-FM	88.1 FM	Chatham	CBC Radio One	public news/talk
CKGW-FM	89.3 FM	Chatham	United Christian Broadcasters Canada	Christian radio
CFCO-FM	91.3 FM	Chatham	Blackburn Radio	country
CKSY-FM	94.3 FM	Chatham	Blackburn Radio	hot adult contemporary
CKUE-FM	95.1 FM	Chatham	Blackburn Radio	classic hits
CKUN-FM	101.3 FM	Christian Island	Chimnissing Communications	First Nations community radio
CHRC-FM	92.5 FM	Clarence-Rockland	Radio communautaire Cornwall-Alexandria	adult hits
CHJJ-FM	90.7 FM	Cobourg	United Christian Broadcasters Canada	Christian radio
CKSG-FM	93.3 FM	Cobourg	My Broadcasting Corporation	adult contemporary
CFMX-FM	103.1 FM	Cobourg	ZoomerMedia	classical
CHUC-FM	107.9 FM	Cobourg	My Broadcasting Corporation	classic rock
CHPB-FM	98.1 FM	Cochrane	Vista Broadcast Group	adult contemporary
CFCJ-FM	102.1 FM	Cochrane	Harvest Ministries Sudbury	Christian radio
CFDY-FM	104.7 FM	Cochrane	Cochrane Polar Bear Radio Club	community radio
CKCB-FM	95.1 FM	Collingwood	Corus Entertainment	adult contemporary
CFMO-FM	102.9 FM	Collingwood	ZoomerMedia	classical
CKID-FM	89.9 FM	Constance Lake	Wawatay	First Nations community radio
CHRI-FM-1	88.1 FM	Cornwall	Christian Hit Radio Inc.	Christian radio
CHOD-FM	92.1 FM	Cornwall	Radio communautaire Cornwall-Alexandria	community radio (French)
CBOC-FM	95.5 FM	Cornwall	CBC Radio One	public news/talk
CBOF-FM-6	98.1 FM	Cornwall	Ici Radio-Canada Première	public news/talk (French)
CJSS-FM	101.9 FM	Cornwall	Corus Entertainment	classic hits
CFLG-FM	104.5 FM	Cornwall	Corus Entertainment	adult contemporary
CBLA-FM-1	90.5 FM	Crystal Beach	CBC Radio One	public news/talk
CBCD-FM-1	97.9 FM	Deep River	CBC Radio One	public news/talk
CKDL-FM	90.1 FM	Deer Lake	Wawatay	First Nations community radio
CIDE-FM-4	91.9 FM	Deer Lake	Wawatay	First Nations community radio
CKDR-FM	92.7 FM	Dryden	Acadia Broadcasting	adult contemporary
CBQH-FM	100.9 FM	Dryden	CBC Radio One	public news/talk
CKSB-6-FM	102.7 FM	Dryden	Ici Radio-Canada Première	public news/talk (French)
CKQV-FM-1	104.3 FM	Dryden	Golden West Broadcasting	classic hits
CBON-FM-11	97.9 FM	Dubreuilville	Ici Radio-Canada Première	public news/talk (French)
CBOI-FM	95.5 FM	Ear Falls	CBC Radio One	public news/talk
CKDR-FM-4	97.5 FM	Ear Falls	Northwoods Broadcasting	adult contemporary
CBCG-FM	89.7 FM	Elk Lake	CBC Radio One	public news/talk
CBEC-FM	90.3 FM	Elliot Lake	CBC Radio One	public news/talk
CKNR-FM	94.1 FM	Elliot Lake	Vista Broadcast Group	adult contemporary
CKNR-FM-1	98.7 FM	Elliot Lake	Vista Broadcast Group	adult contemporary
CBON-FM-5	101.7 FM	Elliot Lake	Ici Radio-Canada Première	public news/talk (French)
CJTK-FM-3	102.5 FM	Elliot Lake	Harvest Ministries Sudbury	Christian radio
CJRO-FM-2	107.7 FM	Embrun	Carlsbad Springs Community Association	community radio (English and French)
CJBB-FM	103.1 FM	Englehart	Northern Radio Corp.	country
CJTK-FM-7	105.7 FM	Englehart	Harvest Ministries Sudbury	Christian radio
CHES-FM	91.7 FM	Erin	Erin Radio	community radio
CBON-FM-7	94.9 FM	Espanola	Ici Radio-Canada Première	public news/talk (French)
CJJM-FM	99.3 FM	Espanola	Vista Broadcast Group	adult hits
CKXM-FM	90.5 FM	Exeter	My Broadcasting Corporation	adult contemporary
CBLF	1450 AM	Foleyet	CBC Radio One	public news/talk
CKFA-FM	90.1 FM	Fort Albany	Wawatay	First Nations community radio
CBCI-FM	102.3 FM	Fort Albany	CBC Radio One	public news/talk
CFLZ-FM	101.1 FM	Fort Erie	Byrnes Communications	adult hits
CKSB-9-FM	89.1 FM	Fort Frances	Ici Radio-Canada Première	public news/talk (French)
CBQQ-FM	90.5 FM	Fort Frances	CBC Radio One	public news/talk
CFOB-FM	93.1 FM	Fort Frances	Acadia Broadcasting	hot adult contemporary
CBCF-FM	101.5 FM	Fort Hope	CBC Radio One	public news/talk
CKFS-FM	90.1 FM	Fort Severn	Wawatay	First Nations community radio
CIDE-FM-5	91.9 FM	Fort Severn	Wawatay	First Nations community radio
CJGM-FM	99.9 FM	Gananoque	My Broadcasting Corporation	adult contemporary
CFGI-FM	92.3 FM	Georgina Island	Georgina Island First Nations Communications	First Nations community radio
CKOU-FM	93.7 FM	Georgina	Torres Media	country
CBLG-FM	89.1 FM	Geraldton	CBC Radio One	public news/talk
CBON-FM-22	93.7 FM	Geraldton	Ici Radio-Canada Première	public news/talk (French)
CHGS-FM	94.7 FM	Geraldton	Municipality of Greenstone	emergency broadcast system
CFNO-FM-4	100.7 FM	Geraldton	Dougall Media	adult contemporary
CIYN-FM-1	99.7 FM	Goderich	Lakeside Radio Broadcasting Corp.	classic hits
CHWC-FM	104.9 FM	Goderich	Bayshore Broadcasting	country
CBON-FM-21	104.9 FM	Gogama	Ici Radio-Canada Première	public news/talk (French)
CKLK-FM	88.5 FM	Grimsby/ Beamsville	Durham Radio	classic hits
CBBS-FM	90.1 FM	Greater Sudbury	CBC Music	public music
CBBX-FM	90.9 FM	Greater Sudbury	Ici Musique	public music (French)
CICS-FM	91.7 FM	Greater Sudbury	Bell Media Radio	country
CJRQ-FM	92.7 FM	Greater Sudbury	Rogers Communications	active rock
CIGM-FM	93.5 FM	Greater Sudbury	Stingray Digital	CHR
CJTK-FM	95.5 FM	Greater Sudbury	Harvest Ministries Sudbury	Christian radio
CKLU-FM	96.7 FM	Greater Sudbury	Laurentian University	campus radio
CBON-FM	98.1 FM	Greater Sudbury	Ici Radio-Canada Première	public news/talk (French)
CHYC-FM	98.9 FM	Greater Sudbury	Le5 Communications	hot adult contemporary (French)
CBCS-FM	99.9 FM	Greater Sudbury	CBC Radio One	public news/talk
CKJC-FM	101.7 FM	Greater Sudbury	1158556 Ontario Ltd. (Roger de Brabant)	tourist information
CHNO-FM	103.9 FM	Greater Sudbury	Stingray Digital	classic hits
CJMX-FM	105.3 FM	Greater Sudbury	Rogers Communications	hot adult contemporary
CJOY	1460 AM	Guelph	Corus Entertainment	oldies
CFRU-FM	93.3 FM	Guelph	University of Guelph	campus radio
CIMJ-FM	106.1 FM	Guelph	Corus Entertainment	hot adult contemporary
CBLY-FM	92.3 FM	Haliburton	CBC Radio One	public news/talk
CFZN-FM	93.5 FM	Haliburton	Vista Broadcast Group	adult hits
CKHA-FM	100.9 FM	Haliburton	Haliburton County Radio Association	community radio
CHAM	820 AM	Hamilton	Neeti Prakash Ray (CINA Media Group)	multilingual
CKOC	1150 AM	Hamilton	Neeti Prakash Ray (CINA Media Group)	classic hits
CFMU-FM	93.3 FM	Hamilton	McMaster University	campus radio
CHKX-FM	94.7 FM	Hamilton	Durham Radio	country
CING-FM	95.3 FM	Hamilton	Corus Entertainment	adult contemporary
CIOI-FM	101.5 FM	Hamilton	Mohawk College	campus radio
CKLH-FM	102.9 FM	Hamilton	Golden Horseshoe Broadcasting (subsidiary of Whiteoaks Communications Group)	adult hits
CFBW-FM	91.3 FM	Hanover	Bluewater Radio	community radio
CIMF-FM-1	88.9 FM	Hawkesbury	Bell Media Radio	adult contemporary (French)
CHPR-FM	102.1 FM	Hawkesbury	RNC Media	adult contemporary (French)
CKHK-FM	107.7 FM	Hawkesbury	Radio communautaire Cornwall-Alexandria	adult hits
CBON-FM-26	90.3 FM	Hearst	Ici Radio-Canada Première	public news/talk (French)
CINN-FM	91.1 FM	Hearst	Radio de l'Épinette Noire	community radio (French)
CBCC-FM	91.9 FM	Hearst	CBC Radio One	public news/talk
CHKT-FM	94.5 FM	Hearst	Vista Broadcast Group	adult contemporary
CBQT-FM-1	92.3 FM	Hornepayne	CBC Radio One	public news/talk
CKHP-FM	104.3 FM	Hornepayne	Township of Hornepayne	
CFNO-FM-2	107.1 FM	Hornepayne	Dougall Media	adult contemporary
CKDR-3-FM	97.5 FM	Hudson	Acadia Broadcasting	adult contemporary
CKAR-FM	88.7 FM	Huntsville	Hunter's Bay Radio Inc.	community radio
CBLU-FM	94.3 FM	Huntsville	CBC Radio One	public news/talk
CJLF-FM-3	98.9 FM	Huntsville	Trust Communications	Christian radio
CFBK-FM	105.5 FM	Huntsville	Vista Broadcast Group	adult contemporary
CBL-FM-1	106.9 FM	Huntsville	CBC Music	public music
CBES	690 AM	Ignace	CBC Radio One	public news/talk
CKDR-FM-1	97.5 FM	Ignace	Northwoods Broadcasting	adult contemporary
VF2561	96.9 FM	Innisfil	Douglas George Edwards	tourist information
CFIF-FM	101.1 FM	Iroquois Falls	Vista Broadcast Group	adult contemporary
CJTK-FM-11	105.9 FM	Iroquois Falls	Harvest Ministries Sudbury	Christian radio
CFQK-FM	104.5 FM	Kaministiquia	Northwest Broadcasting	hot adult contemporary
CJTK-FM-12	88.5 FM	Kapuskasing	Harvest Ministries Sudbury	Christian radio
CKGN-FM	89.7 FM	Kapuskasing	Radio communautaire KapNord	community radio (French)
CBON-FM-24	90.7 FM	Kapuskasing	Ici Radio-Canada Première	public news/talk (French)
CKAP-FM	100.9 FM	Kapuskasing	Vista Broadcast Group	adult contemporary
CBOK-FM	105.1 FM	Kapuskasing	CBC Radio One	public news/talk
CFKP-FM	90.1 FM	Kasabonika	Wawatay	First Nations community radio
CIDE-FM-6	91.9 FM	Kasabonika	Wawatay	First Nations community radio
CKAS-FM	90.1 FM	Kashechewan	Wawatay	First Nations community radio
CIDE-FM-21	91.9 FM	Keewaywin	Wawatay	First Nations community radio
CKVV-FM	97.5 FM	Kemptville	Vista Broadcast Group	variety hits
CJRL-FM	89.5 FM	Kenora	Acadia Broadcasting	adult contemporary
CKSB-7-FM	93.5 FM	Kenora	Ici Radio-Canada Première	public news/talk (French)
CBQX-FM	98.7 FM	Kenora	CBC Radio One	public news/talk
CKQV-FM-2	104.5 FM	Kenora	Golden West Broadcasting	classic hits
CKTI-FM	107.7 FM	Kettle Point	Points Eagle Radio	First Nations community radio
CIYN-FM	95.5 FM	Kincardine	Lakeside Radio Broadcasting Corp.	classic hits
CHCR-FM	102.9 FM	Killaloe	Homegrown Community Radio	community radio
CFKL-FM	90.1 FM	Kingfisher Lake	Wawatay	First Nations community radio
CIDE-FM-7	91.9 FM	Kingfisher Lake	Wawatay	First Nations community radio
CKVI-FM	91.9 FM	Kingston	Kingston Collegiate and Vocational Institute	community radio
CBBK-FM	92.9 FM	Kingston	CBC Music	public music
CKXC-FM	93.5 FM	Kingston	Rogers Communications	country
CFMK-FM	96.3 FM	Kingston	Corus Entertainment	classic hits
CFLY-FM	98.3 FM	Kingston	My Broadcasting Corporation	hot adult contemporary
CKLC-FM	98.9 FM	Kingston	My Broadcasting Corporation	country
CJBC-2-FM	99.5 FM	Kingston	Ici Radio-Canada Première	public news/talk (French)
CKJJ-FM-3	100.5 FM	Kingston	United Christian Broadcasters Canada	Christian radio
CFRC-FM	101.9 FM	Kingston	Radio Queens University	campus radio
CKWS-FM	104.3 FM	Kingston	Corus Entertainment	hot adult contemporary
CIKR-FM	105.7 FM	Kingston	Rogers Communications	active rock
CBCK-FM	107.5 FM	Kingston	CBC Radio One	public news/talk
CBCR-FM	90.3 FM	Kirkland Lake	CBC Radio One	public news/talk
CBON-FM-1	93.7 FM	Kirkland Lake	Ici Radio-Canada Première	public news/talk (French)
CJKL-FM	101.5 FM	Kirkland Lake	Connelly Communications	adult contemporary
CJIQ-FM	88.3 FM	Kitchener	Conestoga College	campus radio
CKBT-FM	91.5 FM	Kitchener	Corus Entertainment	CHR
CJTW-FM	93.7 FM	Kitchener	Sound of Faith Broadcasting	Christian radio
CHYM-FM	96.7 FM	Kitchener	Rogers Communications	adult contemporary
CKZY-FM	89.9 FM	Lac Seul	Lac Seul Radio	First Nations community radio
CIDE-FM-8	91.9 FM	Lac Seul	Wawatay	First Nations community radio
CBEW-FM-1	91.9 FM	Leamington	CBC Radio One	public news/talk
CJSP-FM	92.7 FM	Leamington	Blackburn Radio	country
CHYR-FM	96.7 FM	Leamington	Blackburn Radio	adult contemporary
CBEF-1-FM	103.1 FM	Leamington	Ici Radio-Canada Première	public news/talk (French)
CKLY-FM	91.9 FM	Lindsay	Durham Radio	classic hits
CHLP-FM	100.1 FM	Listowel	Five Amigos Broadcasting	country
CBCE-FM	97.5 FM	Little Current	CBC Radio One	public news/talk
CFRM-FM	100.7 FM	Little Current	Manitoulin Radio Communication	community radio
CJTK-FM-2	102.1 FM	Little Current	Harvest Ministries Sudbury	Christian radio
CHAW-FM	103.1 FM	Little Current	Manitoulin Radio Communication	country
CFPL	980 AM	London	Corus Entertainment	news/talk
CIAL-FM	90.9 FM	London	Malayalam Community Radio Inc.	multilingual (New - CRTC approved January 16, 2023)
CJBX-FM	92.7 FM	London	Bell Media Radio	country
CBCL-FM	93.5 FM	London	CBC Radio One	public news/talk
CHRW-FM	94.9 FM	London	University of Western Ontario	campus radio
CFPL-FM	95.9 FM	London	Corus Entertainment	active rock
CIQM-FM	97.5 FM	London	Bell Media Radio	CHR
CKLO-FM	98.1 FM	London	Blackburn Radio	classic rock
CJBC-4-FM	99.3 FM	London	Ici Radio-Canada Première	public news/talk (French)
CHJX-FM	99.9 FM	London	Sound of Faith Broadcasting	Christian radio
CBBL-FM	100.5 FM	London	CBC Music	public music
CHST-FM	102.3 FM	London	Rogers Communications	classic hits
CIXX-FM	106.9 FM	London	Fanshawe College	campus radio
CFNO-FM-5	107.1 FM	Longlac	Dougall Media	adult contemporary
CKOL-FM-1	100.7 FM	Madoc	Campbellford Area Radio Association	community radio
CBEB-FM	89.7 FM	Manitouwadge	CBC Radio One	public news/talk
CBON-FM-23	96.9 FM	Manitouwadge	Ici Radio-Canada Première	public news/talk (French)
CFNO-FM	93.1 FM	Marathon	Dougall Media	adult contemporary
CBON-FM-29	102.3 FM	Marathon	Ici Radio-Canada Première	public news/talk (French)
CBLM-FM	107.5 FM	Marathon	CBC Radio One	public news/talk
CFMS-FM	105.9 FM	Markham	Bhupinder Bola (OBCI)	English adult contemporary/Multilingual
CBON-12	1090 AM	Mattawa	Ici Radio-Canada Première	public news/talk (French)
CBLO	1240 AM	Mattawa	CBC Radio One	public news/talk
CJTK-FM-4	93.9 FM	Mattawa	Harvest Ministries Sudbury	Christian radio
CBOD-FM	89.3 FM	Maynooth	CBC Radio One	public news/talk
CKJJ-FM-5	94.7 FM	Maynooth	United Christian Broadcasters Canada	Christian radio
CHYF-FM	88.9 FM	M'Chigeeng First Nation	Anong Migwans Beam (GIMA Radio)	First Nations community radio
CJGB-FM	99.3 FM	Meaford	Evanov Communications	adult contemporary
CICZ-FM	104.1 FM	Midland	Bell Media Radio	adult hits
CJML-FM	101.3 FM	Milton	Local Radio Lab Inc.	adult contemporary
CKHA-FM-1	97.1 FM	Minden	Haliburton County Radio Association	community radio
CIDE-FM-11	91.9 FM	Mishkeegogamang	Wawatay	First Nations community radio
CBQN-FM	104.5 FM	Mishkeegogamang	CBC Radio One	public news/talk
CKNT	960 AM	Mississauga	Elliot Kerr	news/talk
CINA	1650 AM	Mississauga	Neeti P. Ray (OBCI)	multilingual
CFRE-FM	91.9 FM	Mississauga	University of Toronto Mississauga	campus radio
CJFI-FM	107.1 FM	Moose Factory	Moose River Broadcasting Association	First Nations community radio
CHMO	1450 AM	Moosonee	James Bay Broadcasting	community radio
VF2372	89.9 FM	Moosonee	Lac Seul Radio	community radio LPFM
CBEY-FM	99.9 FM	Moosonee	CBC Radio One	public news/talk
CIWN-FM	88.7 FM	Mount Forest	Saugeen Community Radio Inc.	community radio
CIDE-FM-9	91.9 FM	Muskrat Dam	Wawatay	First Nations community radio
CFMD-FM	105.1 FM	Muskrat Dam	Wawatay	First Nations community radio
CFNP-FM	90.1 FM	Naicatchewenin	Wawatay	First Nations community radio
CKTE-FM	89.9 FM	Nakina	Aroland Community Radio	First Nations community radio
CBLN-FM	98.1 FM	Nakina	CBC Radio One	public news/talk
CFNO-FM-7	107.1 FM	Nakina	Dougall Media	adult contemporary
CKYM-FM	88.7 FM	Napanee	My Broadcasting Corporation	adult contemporary
CFHL-FM	89.9 FM	Neskantaga	Wawatay	First Nations community radio
CKDX-FM	88.5 FM	Newmarket	Evanov Communications	country
CHOP-FM	102.7 FM	Newmarket	Pickering College	campus radio
CHFN-FM	100.1 FM	Neyaashiinigmiing	Chippewas of Nawash	First Nations community radio
CJED-FM	105.1 FM	Niagara Falls	Byrnes Communications	Hot Adult Contemporary
CHQI-FM	90.7 FM	Niagara-on-the-Lake	Jeannine Dancy	tourist information
CKYW-FM	89.9 FM	Nibinamik	Wawatay	First Nations community radio
CBON-FM-19	97.3 FM	Nipigon	Ici Radio-Canada Première	public news/talk (French)
CBQY-FM	98.9 FM	Nipigon	CBC Radio One	public news/talk
CFNO-FM-1	100.7 FM	Nipigon	Dougall Media	adult contemporary
CKAT	600 AM	North Bay	Rogers Communications	country
CFCH-FM	90.5 FM	North Bay	Vista Broadcast Group	country
CBON-FM-17	95.1 FM	North Bay	Ici Radio-Canada Première	public news/talk (French)
CBCN-FM	96.1 FM	North Bay	CBC Radio One	public news/talk
CHUR-FM	100.5 FM	North Bay	Rogers Communications	hot adult contemporary
CKFX-FM	101.9 FM	North Bay	Rogers Communications	active rock
CJTK-FM-1	103.5 FM	North Bay	Harvest Ministries Sudbury	Christian radio
CFXN-FM	106.3 FM	North Bay	Vista Broadcast Group	classic hits
CKFC-FM	89.9 FM	North Spirit Lake	Wawatay	First Nations community radio
CIDE-FM-10	91.9 FM	North Spirit Lake	Wawatay	First Nations community radio
Unknown	93.9 FM	Oakville	MusicZone 93.9 FM	community radio
CKFN-FM	89.9 FM	Ogoki Post	Wawatay	First Nations community radio
CKRZ-FM	100.3 FM	Ohsweken	Southern Onkwehonwe Nishinaabec	First Nations community radio
CKMO-FM	101.5 FM	Orangeville	Local Radio Lab Inc.	adult contemporary
CIDC-FM	103.5 FM	Orangeville	Evanov Communications	CHR
CISO-FM	89.1 FM	Orillia	Bayshore Broadcasting	modern rock
CBL-FM-3	90.7 FM	Orillia	CBC Music	public music
CBCO-FM	91.5 FM	Orillia	CBC Radio One	public news/talk
CIOA-FM	98.5 FM	Orillia	Instant Information Services	tourist information
CICX-FM	105.9 FM	Orillia	Bell Media Radio	country
CKDO	1580 AM	Oshawa	Durham Radio	oldies
CKGE-FM	94.9 FM	Oshawa	Durham Radio	active rock
CKDO-FM-1	107.7 FM	Oshawa	Durham Radio	oldies
CFRA	580 AM	Ottawa	Bell Media Radio	news/talk
CFGO	1200 AM	Ottawa	Bell Media Radio	sports
CILV-FM	88.5 FM	Ottawa	Stingray Digital	modern rock
CHUO-FM	89.1 FM	Ottawa	University of Ottawa	campus radio
CIHT-FM	89.9 FM	Ottawa	Stingray Digital	CHR
CBOF-FM	90.7 FM	Ottawa	Ici Radio-Canada Première	public news/talk (French)
CBO-FM	91.5 FM	Ottawa	CBC Radio One	public news/talk
CJVN-FM	92.7 FM	Ottawa	Fiston Kalambay (OBCI)	Christian radio (French)
CKCU-FM	93.1 FM	Ottawa	Carleton University	campus radio
CKKL-FM	93.9 FM	Ottawa	Bell Media Radio	country
CJFO-FM	94.5 FM	Ottawa	Radio de la communauté francophone d’Ottawa	community radio (French)
CJLL-FM	97.9 FM	Ottawa	CHIN Radio/TV International	multilingual
CITM-FM	98.5 FM	Ottawa	Frank Torres (OBCI)	adult contemporary
CHRI-FM	99.1 FM	Ottawa	Christian Hit Radio Inc.	Christian radio
CJOT-FM	99.7 FM	Ottawa	Corus Entertainment	classic hits
CJMJ-FM	100.3 FM	Ottawa	Bell Media Radio	adult contemporary
CIDG-FM	101.7 FM	Ottawa	Frank Torres (OBCI)	Mainstream rock
CBOX-FM	102.5 FM	Ottawa	Ici Musique	public music (French)
CBOQ-FM	103.3 FM	Ottawa	CBC Music	public music
CISS-FM	105.3 FM	Ottawa	Rogers Communications	hot adult contemporary
CHEZ-FM	106.1 FM	Ottawa	Rogers Communications	classic rock
CKQB-FM	106.9 FM	Ottawa	Corus Entertainment	Top 40/CHR
CKDJ-FM	107.9 FM	Ottawa	Algonquin College	campus radio
CFOS-FM	89.3 FM	Owen Sound	Bayshore Broadcasting	classic hits
CJLF-FM-1	90.1 FM	Owen Sound	Trust Communications	Christian radio
CJOS-FM	92.3 FM	Owen Sound	ZoomerMedia	oldies
CKYC-FM	93.7 FM	Owen Sound	Bayshore Broadcasting	country
CBCB-FM	98.7 FM	Owen Sound	CBC Radio One	public news/talk
CIXK-FM	106.5 FM	Owen Sound	Bayshore Broadcasting	hot adult contemporary
CBLA-FM-2	89.1 FM	Paris	CBC Radio One	public news/talk
CJBC-FM-2	89.9 FM	Paris	Ici Musique	public music (French)
CBL-FM-2	90.7 FM	Paris	CBC Music	public music
CBLR-FM	89.9 FM	Parry Sound	CBC Radio One	public news/talk
CKLP-FM	103.3 FM	Parry Sound	Vista Broadcast Group	adult hits
CKWN-FM	89.9 FM	Peawanuck	Wawatay	First Nations community radio
CBCD-FM	92.5 FM	Pembroke	CBC Radio One	public news/talk
CHVR-FM	96.7 FM	Pembroke	Bell Media Radio	country
CKQB-FM-1	99.9 FM	Pembroke	Corus Entertainment	Top 40/CHR
CHRI-FM-2	100.7 FM	Pembroke	Christian Hit Radio Inc.	Christian radio
CIMY-FM	104.9 FM	Pembroke	My Broadcasting Corporation	adult contemporary
CFRH-FM	88.1 FM	Penetanguishene	Radio Huronie	community radio (French)
CBCM-FM	89.7 FM	Penetanguishene	CBC Radio One	public news/talk
CJBC-FM-3	96.5 FM	Penetanguishene	Ici Radio-Canada Première	public news/talk (French)
CHLK-FM	88.1 FM	Perth	My Broadcasting Corporation	adult contemporary
CJLF-FM-2	89.3 FM	Peterborough	Trust Communications	Christian radio
CJMB-FM	90.5 FM	Peterborough	My Broadcasting Corporation	modern rock/sports
CFFF-FM	92.7 FM	Peterborough	Trent Radio	Community Radio
CJWV-FM	96.7 FM	Peterborough	My Broadcasting Corporation	classic hits
CBCP-FM	98.7 FM	Peterborough	CBC Radio One	public news/talk
CKPT-FM	99.7 FM	Peterborough	Durham Radio	hot adult contemporary
CKRU-FM	100.5 FM	Peterborough	Corus Entertainment	hot adult contemporary
CKWF-FM	101.5 FM	Peterborough	Corus Entertainment	active rock
CBBP-FM	103.9 FM	Peterborough	CBC Music	public music
CKXP-FM	105.1 FM	Peterborough	Durham Radio	country
CJBC-FM-5	106.3 FM	Peterborough	Ici Radio-Canada Première	public news/talk (French)
CJTL-FM	96.5 FM	Pickle Lake	Native Evangelical Fellowship of Canada	First Nations community radio
CBQP-FM	105.1 FM	Pickle Lake	CBC Radio One	public news/talk
CIPR-FM	97.3 FM	Pigeon River Bridge	Superior Info Radio	tourist information
CIDE-FM-12	91.9 FM	Pikangikum	Wawatay	First Nations community radio
CBQU-FM	100.3 FM	Pikangikum	CBC Radio One	public news/talk
CJPP-FM	90.7 FM	Point Pelee National Park	Parks Canada	tourist information
CFBY-FM	90.1 FM	Poplar Hill	Wawatay	First Nations community radio
CIDE-FM-13	91.9 FM	Poplar Hill	Wawatay	First Nations community radio
CIYN-FM-2	90.9 FM	Port Elgin	Lakeside Radio Broadcasting Corp.	classic hits
CFPS-FM	97.9 FM	Port Elgin	Bayshore Broadcasting	active rock
CFWN-FM	89.7 FM	Port Hope	Small Town Radio (STR)	community radio
CKPP-FM	107.9 FM	Prescott	Vista Broadcast Group	variety hits
CJPE-FM	99.3 FM	Prince Edward County	Prince Edward County Radio Corporation	community radio
CJTN-FM	107.1 FM	Quinte West	Quinte Broadcasting	classic rock
CBEA-FM	90.5 FM	Red Lake	CBC Radio One	public news/talk
CKDR-FM-5	97.1 FM	Red Lake	Northwoods Broadcasting	adult contemporary
CHMY-FM	96.1 FM	Renfrew	My Broadcasting Corporation	adult contemporary
CJHR-FM	98.7 FM	Renfrew	Valley Heritage Radio	community radio
CFIQ	640 AM	Richmond Hill	Corus Entertainment	news/talk/sports
CBOF-FM-4	98.5 FM	Rolphton	Ici Radio-Canada Première	public news/talk (French)
CKTB	610 AM	St. Catharines	Golden Horseshoe Broadcasting (subsidiary of Whiteoaks Communications Group)	news/talk
CFAJ	1220 AM	St. Catharines	Radio Dhun	classic hits
CFBN-FM	93.3 FM	St. Catharines	The St. Lawrence Seaway Management Corporation	tourist information
CHTZ-FM	97.7 FM	St. Catharines	Golden Horseshoe Broadcasting (subsidiary of Whiteoaks Communications Group)	active rock
CFBU-FM	103.7 FM	St. Catharines	Brock University	campus radio
CHRE-FM	105.7 FM	St. Catharines	Golden Horseshoe Broadcasting (subsidiary of Whiteoaks Communications Group)	adult contemporary
VF8016	90.1 FM	St. Thomas	Faith Baptist Church of St. Thomas	Christian radio LPFM
CKZM-FM	94.1 FM	St. Thomas	My Broadcasting Corporation	adult contemporary
CFHK-FM	103.1 FM	St. Thomas	Corus Entertainment	hot adult contemporary
CFEY-FM	90.1 FM	Sachigo Lake	Wawatay	First Nations community radio
CIDE-FM-14	91.9 FM	Sachigo Lake	Wawatay	First Nations community radio
CIDE-FM-15	91.9 FM	Sandy Lake	Wawatay	First Nations community radio
CBQV-FM	101.1 FM	Sandy Lake	CBC Radio One	public news/talk
CHOK	1070 AM	Sarnia	Blackburn Radio	full service/variety
CBEG-FM	90.3 FM	Sarnia	CBC Radio One	public news/talk
CFGX-FM	99.9 FM	Sarnia	Blackburn Radio	adult contemporary
CBEF-3-FM	101.5 FM	Sarnia	Ici Radio-Canada Première	public news/talk (French)
CHOK-1-FM	103.9 FM	Sarnia	Blackburn Radio	full service/variety
CHKS-FM	106.3 FM	Sarnia	Blackburn Radio	classic hits
CJRO-FM-3	107.9 FM	Sarsfield	Carlsbad Springs Community Association	community radio (English and French)
CBON-FM-18	88.1 FM	Sault Ste. Marie	Ici Radio-Canada Première	public news/talk (French)
CBSM-FM	89.5 FM	Sault Ste. Marie	CBC Radio One	public news/talk
CFWJ-FM	92.9 FM	Sault Ste. Marie	Elliott Communications	tourist information
CHAS-FM	100.5 FM	Sault Ste. Marie	Rogers Communications	hot adult contemporary
CJQM-FM	104.3 FM	Sault Ste. Marie	Rogers Communications	active rock
CJTK-FM-8	106.5 FM	Sault Ste. Marie	Harvest Ministries Sudbury	Christian radio
CBQL-FM	104.9 FM	Savant Lake	CBC Radio One	public news/talk
CBLB-FM	90.9 FM	Schreiber	CBC Radio One	public news/talk
CHIX-FM	89.9 FM	Seine River	Wawatay	First Nations community radio
CBLA-FM-4	102.5 FM	Shelburne	CBC Radio One	public news/talk
CFDC-FM	104.9 FM	Shelburne	Bayshore Broadcasting	country
CKED-FM	103.5 FM	Shuniah	Northwest Broadcasting	hot adult contemporary
CHCD-FM	98.9 FM	Simcoe	My Broadcasting Corporation	adult contemporary
CKNC-FM	99.7 FM	Simcoe	My Broadcasting Corporation	classic hits
CKWT-FM	89.9 FM	Sioux Lookout	Wawatay	First Nations community radio
CIDE-FM	91.9 FM	Sioux Lookout	Wawatay	First Nations community radio
CBLS-FM	95.3 FM	Sioux Lookout	CBC Radio One	public news/talk
CKDR-FM-2	97.1 FM	Sioux Lookout	Northwoods Broadcasting	adult contemporary
CKQV-FM-3	104.1 FM	Sioux Lookout	Golden West Broadcasting	classic hits
CKSX-FM	91.1 FM	Sioux Narrows	The Corporation of the Township of Sioux Narrows-Nestor Falls	community radio
CBQS-FM	95.7 FM	Sioux Narrows	CBC Radio One	public news/talk
CHBJ-FM	90.1 FM	Slate Falls	Wawatay	First Nations community radio
CIDE-FM-16	91.9 FM	Slate Falls	Wawatay	First Nations community radio
CJET-FM	92.3 FM	Smiths Falls	My Broadcasting Corporation	classic hits
CKBY-FM	101.1 FM	Smiths Falls	Rogers Communications	country
CHDY-FM	88.5 FM	Smooth Rock Falls	Cochrane Polar Bear Radio Club	community radio
CKGN-FM-1	94.7 FM	Smooth Rock Falls	Radio communautaire KapNord	community radio (French)
CKFW-FM	99.1 FM	Sorrell Lake	William J. Smith	tourist information
CHEI-FM	89.9 FM	South Baymouth	Vamplew Electronics	tourist information
CJTK-FM-10	104.9 FM	Spring Bay	Harvest Ministries Sudbury	Christian radio
CJAI-FM	101.3 FM	Stella	Amherst Island Public Radio	community radio
CJCS-FM	107.1 FM	Stratford	Vista Broadcast Group	oldies
CHGK-FM	107.7 FM	Stratford	Vista Broadcast Group	adult contemporary
CJMI-FM	105.7 FM	Strathroy	My Broadcasting Corporation	adult contemporary
CHYQ-FM	97.1 FM	Sturgeon Falls	Le5 Communications	hot adult contemporary (French)
CFSF-FM	99.3 FM	Sturgeon Falls	Vista Broadcast Group	adult contemporary
CJKX-FM-1	89.9 FM	Sunderland	Durham Radio	country
CJTK-FM-9	98.3 FM	Sundridge	Harvest Ministries Sudbury	Christian radio
CJTI-FM	92.1 FM	Temagami	1158556 Ontario Ltd. (Roger de Brabant)	tourist information
CBCS-FM-1	106.1 FM	Temagami	CBC Radio One	public news/talk
CBON-FM-2	99.7 FM	Temiskaming Shores	Ici Radio-Canada Première	public news/talk (French)
CJTK-FM-6	100.9 FM	Temiskaming Shores	Harvest Ministries Sudbury	Christian radio
CBCY-FM	102.3 FM	Temiskaming Shores	CBC Radio One	public news/talk
CJTT-FM	104.5 FM	Temiskaming Shores	Connelly Communications	adult contemporary
CFSD-FM	105.1 FM	Temiskaming Shores	Seventh Day Adventist Church of Haileybury	Christian radio (NEW - Airdate to be announced)
CKBK-FM	104.3 FM	Thamesville	Lenape Community Radio Society	First Nations community radio
CBQT-FM	88.3 FM	Thunder Bay	CBC Radio One	public news/talk
CBON-FM-20	89.3 FM	Thunder Bay	Ici Radio-Canada Première	public news/talk (French)
CKSI-FM	90.5 FM	Thunder Bay	Thunder Bay Information Radio	tourist information
CKPR-FM	91.5 FM	Thunder Bay	Dougall Media	adult contemporary
CJSD-FM	94.3 FM	Thunder Bay	Dougall Media	active rock
CJOA-FM	95.1 FM	Thunder Bay	St. Joseph's Care Group	Christian radio
CITB-FM	97.1 FM	Thunder Bay	Superior Info Radio	tourist information
CJTL-FM-1	98.1 FM	Thunder Bay	Native Evangelical Fellowship of Canada	First Nations community radio
CJUK-FM	99.9 FM	Thunder Bay	Acadia Broadcasting	adult contemporary
CBQ-FM	101.7 FM	Thunder Bay	CBC Music	public music
CILU-FM	102.7 FM	Thunder Bay	Lakehead University	campus radio
CKTG-FM	105.3 FM	Thunder Bay	Acadia Broadcasting	country
CBCL-FM-1	88.7 FM	Tillsonburg	CBC Radio One	public news/talk
CKOT-FM	101.3 FM	Tillsonburg	My Broadcasting Corporation	classic rock
CJDL-FM	107.3 FM	Tillsonburg	My Broadcasting Corporation	country
CJQQ-FM	92.1 FM	Timmins	Rogers Communications	active rock
CHMT-FM	93.1 FM	Timmins	Vista Broadcast Group	country
CBCJ-FM	96.1 FM	Timmins	CBC Radio One	public news/talk
CBON-FM-25	97.1 FM	Timmins	Ici Radio-Canada Première	public news/talk (French)
CKGB-FM	99.3 FM	Timmins	Rogers Communications	hot adult contemporary
CHYK-FM	104.1 FM	Timmins	Le5 Communications	hot adult contemporary (French)
CJTK-FM-5	105.5 FM	Timmins	Harvest Ministries Sudbury	Christian radio
CJWT-FM	106.7 FM	Timmins	Wawatay	First Nations community radio
CFPS-FM-1	91.9 FM	Tobermory	Bayshore Broadcasting	active rock
CIBP-FM	104.3 FM	Tobermory	Bayshore Broadcasting	tourist information
CJCL	590 AM	Toronto	Rogers Communications	sports
CFTR	680 AM	Toronto	Rogers Communications	news
CFZM	740 AM	Toronto	ZoomerMedia	pop standards
CJBC	860 AM	Toronto	Ici Radio-Canada Première	public news/talk (French)
CFRB	1010 AM	Toronto	Bell Media Radio	news/talk
CHUM	1050 AM	Toronto	Bell Media Radio	sports
CJTM	1280 AM	Toronto	Toronto Metropolitan University	campus radio
CHKT	1430 AM	Toronto	Fairchild Radio	multilingual
CHIN	1540 AM	Toronto	CHIN Radio/TV International	multilingual
CHHA	1610 AM	Toronto	San Lorenzo Latin American Community Centre	community radio (Spanish)
CHTO	1690 AM	Toronto	Canadian Hellenic Toronto Radio	multilingual
CIND-FM	88.1 FM	Toronto	Rock 95 Broadcasting	indie rock
CIRV-FM	88.9 FM	Toronto	Frank Alvarez	multilingual
CIUT-FM	89.5 FM	Toronto	University of Toronto St. George	campus radio
CJBC-FM	90.3 FM	Toronto	Ici Musique	public music (French)
CJRT-FM	91.1 FM	Toronto	CJRT-FM Inc.	jazz
CHIN-1-FM	91.9 FM	Toronto	CHIN Radio/TV International	multilingual
CKIS-FM	92.5 FM	Toronto	Rogers Communications	CHR
CFXJ-FM	93.5 FM	Toronto	Stingray Digital	country
CBL-FM	94.1 FM	Toronto	CBC Music	public music
CJKX-FM-2	95.9 FM	Toronto	Durham Radio	country
CFMZ-FM	96.3 FM	Toronto	ZoomerMedia	classical
CKHC-FM	96.9 FM	Toronto	Humber College	campus radio
CHBM-FM	97.3 FM	Toronto	Stingray Digital	classic hits
CHFI-FM	98.1 FM	Toronto	Rogers Communications	adult contemporary
CKFG-FM	98.7 FM	Toronto	Intercity Broadcasting Network	multilingual
CBLA-FM	99.1 FM	Toronto	CBC Radio One	public news/talk
CKFM-FM	99.9 FM	Toronto	Bell Media Radio	CHR
CHIN-FM	100.7 FM	Toronto	CHIN Radio/TV International	multilingual
CJSA-FM	101.3 FM	Toronto	Diversity Media Group	multilingual
CJRK-FM	102.7 FM	Toronto (Scarborough)	8041393 Canada Inc.	multilingual
CHUM-FM	104.5 FM	Toronto	Bell Media Radio	hot adult contemporary
CHOQ-FM	105.1 FM	Toronto	Cooperative Radio-Toronto	community radio (French)
CKSC-FM	105.3 FM	Toronto (Scarborough)	International Harvesters for Christ Evangelistic Association Inc.	Christian radio (NEW - Airdate to be announced)
CHRY-FM	105.5 FM	Toronto	Canadian Centre for Civic Media and Arts Development Inc.	urban alternative
CILQ-FM	107.1 FM	Toronto	Corus Entertainment	Mainstream rock
CKYA-FM	89.5 FM	Tyendinaga Mohawk Territory	Tsi Tyónnheht Onkwawén	First Nations community radio (Approved November 15, 2023; Airdate to be announced)
CIUX-FM	105.5 FM	Uxbridge	Frank Torres (OBCI)	classic hits
VEF315	88.7 FM	Vankleek Hill	Jean Sarrazin	community radio
CJRO-FM-1	107.9 FM	Vars	Carlsbad Springs Community Association	community radio (English and French)
CFU758	90.7 FM	Vaughan	Hodan Nalayeh Secondary School	high school radio
CKQV-FM	103.3 FM	Vermilion Bay	Golden West Broadcasting	classic hits
CKXS-FM	99.1 FM	Wallaceburg	Five Amigos Broadcasting	variety hits
CFRZ-FM	98.3 FM	Walpole Island	Walpole Island First Nation Radio	First Nations community radio
CHIO-FM	89.9 FM	Wapekeka	Wawatay	First Nations community radio
CIDE-FM-17	91.9 FM	Wapekeka	Wawatay	First Nations community radio
CHGB-FM	97.7 FM	Wasaga Beach	Bayshore Broadcasting	classic hits
CHRZ-FM	91.3 FM	Wasauksing	Wasauksing Communications Group	First Nations community radio
CKWR-FM	98.5 FM	Waterloo	Wired World Inc.	community radio
CFCA-FM	99.5 FM	Waterloo	Bell Media Radio	CHR
CKMS-FM	102.7 FM	Waterloo	Radio Waterloo	community radio
CKKW-FM	105.3 FM	Waterloo	Bell Media Radio	adult hits
CIKZ-FM	106.7 FM	Waterloo	Rogers Communications	country
CKWO-FM	101.3 FM	Anishinabe of Wauzhushk Onigum/Kenora	WONation Radio Inc	First Nations community radio
CBLJ-FM	88.3 FM	Wawa	CBC Radio One	public news/talk
CBON-FM-27	90.7 FM	Wawa	Ici Radio-Canada Première	public news/talk (French)
CJWA-FM	107.1 FM	Wawa	Labbe Media	adult contemporary
CHWL-FM	90.1 FM	Weagamow Lake	Wawatay	First Nations community radio
CIDE-FM-18	91.9 FM	Weagamow Lake	Wawatay	First Nations community radio
CKPN-FM	90.1 FM	Webequie	Wawatay	First Nations community radio
CIDE-FM-20	91.9 FM	Webequie	Wawatay	First Nations community radio
CKYY-FM	89.1 FM	Welland	My Broadcasting Corporation	country
CIXL-FM	91.7 FM	Welland	My Broadcasting Corporation	classic rock
CIWS-FM	102.9 FM	Whitchurch–Stouffville	WhiStle Community Radio	community radio
CBLW-FM	97.7 FM	White River	CBC Radio One	public news/talk
CFNO-FM-8	100.7 FM	White River	Dougall Media	adult contemporary
CHWR-FM	89.9 FM	Whitesand	Whitesand Communication Group	First Nations community radio
CBCW-FM	98.5 FM	Whitney	CBC Radio One	public news/talk
CBL-FM-4	97.1 FM	Wiarton	CBC Music	public music
CHCR-FM-1	104.5 FM	Wilno	Homegrown Community Radio	community radio
CKWW	580 AM	Windsor	Neeti Prakash Ray (CINA Media Group)	oldies
CKLW	800 AM	Windsor	Bell Media Radio	news/talk
CBEF	1550 AM	Windsor	Ici Radio-Canada Première	public news/talk (French)
CIMX-FM	88.7 FM	Windsor	Bell Media Radio	Alternative rock
CBE-FM	89.9 FM	Windsor	CBC Music	public music
CJAH-FM	90.5 FM	Windsor	United Christian Broadcasters Canada	Christian radio
CIDR-FM	93.9 FM	Windsor	Bell Media Radio	CHR
CJWF-FM	95.9 FM	Windsor	Blackburn Radio	country
CBEW-FM	97.5 FM	Windsor	CBC Radio One	public news/talk
CJAM-FM	99.1 FM	Windsor	University of Windsor	campus radio
CKUE-FM-1	100.7 FM	Windsor	Blackburn Radio	classic hits
CINA-FM	102.3 FM	Windsor	Neeti P. Ray (OBCI)	multilingual
CJBC-FM-1	103.9 FM	Windsor	Ici Musique	public music (French)
CBEF-2-FM	105.5 FM	Windsor	Ici Radio-Canada Première	public news/talk (French)
CKNX	920 AM	Wingham	Blackburn Radio	country
CIBU-FM	94.5 FM	Wingham	Blackburn Radio	classic hits
CBLA-FM-3	100.9 FM	Wingham	CBC Radio One	public news/talk
CKNX-FM	101.7 FM	Wingham	Blackburn Radio	adult contemporary
CJFH-FM	94.3 FM	Woodstock	Sound of Faith Broadcasting	Christian radio
CKDK-FM	103.9 FM	Woodstock	Corus Entertainment	country
CIHR-FM	104.7 FM	Woodstock	Byrnes Communications	adult contemporary
CHPM-FM	90.1 FM	Wunnummin Lake	Wawatay	First Nations community radio
CIDE-FM-19	91.9 FM	Wunnummin Lake	Wawatay	First Nations community radio

Internet-only

Frequency	City of license	Owner	Branding	Format
Internet only	Ottawa	CBC	ICI musique Atmosphere	Ambient
Internet only	Ottawa	Mix97fm	Throwback 97 FM	classic hip hop/R&B
Internet only	Ottawa	CBC	ICI musique Classique	Classical radio
Internet only	Ottawa	CBC	ICI musique Rock	Rock
Internet only	Ottawa	Quebecor Media	Qub Radio	Talk radio
Internet only	Ottawa	CBC	ICI musique Hip Hop	Urban Contemporary
Internet only	Ottawa	Mix97fm	Mix97FM	Urban Contemporary
Internet only	Toronto	Roots Rock Radio Inc.	Rootz Reggae Radio	Caribbean
Internet only	Toronto	Whiteoaks Communication Group Limited (Trafalgar Broadcasting)	Joy Radio	Christian
Internet only	Toronto	ClassicHitsOnline.com	Classichitsonline	Classic hits
Internet only	Toronto	N/A	DJFM	Dance
Internet only	Toronto	ctuRadio	CtuDance	Dance
Internet only	Toronto	Euro nation	Euro nation	Dance
Internet only	Toronto	Pastor Georges	Radio tikoze ak Letèrnèl	Gospel
Internet only	Toronto	Streemlion	Power plant organization	Heavy metal
Internet only	Toronto	SpiritLive Radio	SpiritLive	high school radio
Internet only	Toronto	N/A	Reality radio 101	Mainstream rock
Internet only	Toronto	Polskie Radio Toronto Ltd.	Radio 7 Toronto	Multilingual
Internet only	Toronto	ciaoitaliaradio.com	Ciao Italia Radio	Multilingual
Internet only	Toronto	Radio NOVA Toronto	Radio NOVA Toronto	Multilingual
Internet only	Toronto	Radio Megapolis	Radio Megapolis Toronto	Multilingual
Internet only	Toronto	AGNI Communications Inc	TIME FM Toronto	Multilingual
Internet only	Toronto	Whiteoaks Communication Group Limited (Trafalgar Broadcasting)	CJMR	Multilingual
Internet only	Toronto	RetroHits.ca	RetroHits.ca	Oldies
Internet only	Toronto	N/A	Texas gospel Canada	Southern gospel
Internet only	Toronto	N/A	Toronto Latin radio	Spanish Tropical/Urbano
Internet only	Toronto	CJRR-DB Radio Echelon	Radio Echelon	Urban AC/Caribbean
Internet only	Toronto	N/A	Soul Provider	Urban oldies
Internet only	Toronto	LuvBay Media Group	LuvBay	Urban/Caribbean/African pop
Internet only	Toronto	Toronto Urbano Music	Toronto Urbano Radio	Urbano
Internet only	Toronto	Focus Media Arts Centre.	Radio Regent	Variety
Internet only	Westport	N/A	Rideau Lakes Radio	Variety

== See also ==
- Lists of radio stations in North and Central America
- Media in Canada
