= CIDE-FM =

First Nations radio station in Sioux Lookout, Ontario

Coordinates: 50°06′17″N 91°55′10″W

- Sioux Lookout, Ontario; Canada
- Broadcast area: Kenora District; Northwestern Ontario
- Frequency: 91.9 MHz
- Branding: Wahsa Radio

Programming
- Format: First Nations

Ownership
- Owner: Wawatay Native Communications Society
- Sister stations: CKWT-FM

Technical information
- Licensing authority: CRTC
- Class: LP
- ERP: 10 watts (vert.)
- HAAT: 12 metres (39 ft)

Links
- Website: nnec.on.ca/wahsa

CIDE-FM is a Canadian First Nations radio station belonging to the Wawatay Native Communications Society, broadcasting at 91.9 FM in Sioux Lookout, Ontario. The station broadcasts distance education and informational programming through the Northern Nishnawbe Education Council. CIDE-FM has an extensive network of rebroadcasters throughout Northwestern Ontario.

== Rebroadcasters ==
CIDE's retransmitters always use the same 91.9 FM frequency as the originating station in Sioux Lookout. Transmitters are located in the following communities:

- CIDE-FM-1 Bearskin Lake
- CIDE-FM-2 Big Trout Lake
- CIDE-FM-3 Cat Lake
- CIDE-FM-4 Deer Lake
- CIDE-FM-5 Fort Severn
- CIDE-FM-6 Kasabonika
- CIDE-FM-7 Kingfisher Lake
- CIDE-FM-8 Lac Seul
- CIDE-FM-9 Muskrat Dam
- CIDE-FM-10 North Spirit Lake
- CIDE-FM-11 New Osnaburgh
- CIDE-FM-12 Pikangikum
- CIDE-FM-13 Poplar Hill
- CIDE-FM-14 Sachigo Lake
- CIDE-FM-15 Sandy Lake
- CIDE-FM-16 Slate Falls
- CIDE-FM-17 Wapekeka
- CIDE-FM-18 Weagamow Lake
- CIDE-FM-19 Wunnummin Lake
- CIDE-FM-20 Webequie
- CIDE-FM-21 Keewaywin
