= CKWT-FM =

First Nations radio station in northwestern Ontario, Canada

Coordinates: 50.09983°N 91.91892°W

- Sioux Lookout, Ontario; Canada
- Broadcast area: Kenora District, Northwestern Ontario
- Frequency: 89.9 MHz
- Branding: Wawatay Radio Network

Programming
- Format: First Nations

Ownership
- Owner: Wawatay Native Communications Society
- Sister stations: CIDE-FM

History
- Call sign meaning: "Wawatay"

Technical information
- Licensing authority: CRTC
- Class: A1
- ERP: 224 watts (vert.)
- HAAT: 18.5 metres (61 ft)

Links
- Website: wawataynews.ca

CKWT-FM is a radio station of Wawatay Radio Network in Sioux Lookout, Ontario, Canada. The station airs a programming format for First Nations, and serves much of Northwestern Ontario through a network of rebroadcast transmitters.

== Rebroadcasters ==
City of licence	Identifier	Frequency	RECNet
Bearskin Lake	CFBL-FM	90.1	Query
Poplar Hill	CFBY-FM	90.1	Query
Sachigo Lake	CFEY-FM	90.1	Query
Lansdowne House	CFHL-FM	89.9	Query
Kingfisher Lake	CFKL-FM	90.1	Query
Kasabonika	CFKP-FM	90.1	Query
Muskrat Dam	CFMD-FM	105.1	Query
Naicatchewenin	CFNP-FM	90.1	Query
Slate Falls	CHBJ-FM	90.1	Query
Wapekeka	CHIO-FM	89.9	Query
Seine River	CHIX-FM	89.9	Query
Wunnummin Lake	CHPM-FM	90.1	Query
Weagamow Lake	CHWL-FM	90.1	Query
Cat Lake	CJPS-FM	89.9	Query
North Spirit Lake	CKFC-FM	89.9	Query
Kashechewan	CKAS-FM	90.1	Query
Deer Lake	CKDL-FM	90.1	Query
Fort Albany	CKFA-FM	90.1	Query
Fort Severn	CKFS-FM	90.1	Query
Constance Lake	CKID-FM	89.9	Query
Attawapiskat	CKMT-FM	89.9	Query
Summer Beaver	CKYW-FM	89.9	Query
Peawanuck/Winisk	CKWN-FM	89.9	Query

== Notes ==
On March 4, 2016, the CRTC approved Wawatay's application for a broadcasting licence to operate a low-power Type B Native FM radio station in Sioux Lookout, Ontario. The station would operate at 89.9 MHz (channel 210A1) with an effective radiated power of 224 watts (non-directional antenna with an effective height above average terrain of 18.5 metres).

== See also ==
- CIDE-FM
- CHWR-FM
- CJWT-FM
