= NAC Air =

Canadian airline

IATA	ICAO	Call sign
-	HMR	HAMMER
- Founded: 2000
- Ceased operations: 2008
- Hubs: Thunder Bay International Airport
- Fleet size: 11
- Destinations: 26
- Headquarters: Thunder Bay, Ontario, Canada
- Key people: Tom Meilleur (COO), Dino Armenti (CFO)
- Website: http://www.nacair.ca/

NAC Air was a Canadian regional airline that began operations in 2000. Its main base was at the Thunder Bay International Airport. NAC Air was a 100% First Nations-owned company, owned by the communities of Eabametoong (Fort Hope), Neskantaga (Lansdowne House), Webequie, Sachigo Lake, and Sandy Lake.

NAC Air ceased operations indefinitely in early 2008 due to financial difficulties.

== History ==
North American Charters (NAC) was established in 2000 to provide cheaper and more frequent airline services to First Nations communities in Northwestern Ontario. NAC offered daily services with the possibility of same-day returns for business travelers. It commenced services with two Piper PA31-350 Chieftains and quickly added a Fairchild SA226-TC Metro II as well. The two Chieftains were soon replaced by the first Pilatus PC-12s and the Metro was also retired at the end of 2001. NAC grew steadily, evolving from the early two aircraft operation serving four communities to an eleven aircraft operation connecting Sioux Lookout, Ontario; Winnipeg; Thunder Bay; Red Lake, Ontario; Thompson, Manitoba and 21 First Nations communities. In 2006, NAC changed its name to NAC Air; this coincided with the company moving into a new three-storey office and hangar complex at the Thunder Bay International Airport. In 2007 a base was opened in Winnipeg, Manitoba, it serviced 2 aircraft which flew out of Winnipeg and 1 which flew out of Thompson, Manitoba.

On 13 January 2008, NAC Air ceased operations indefinitely due to financial difficulties, they claim, stemmed from a lawsuit with rival Wasaya Airways. The shut down forced 150 employees off the job.

== Service Communities ==
- Brochet
- Bearskin Lake
- Big Trout Lake
- Deer Lake
- Fort Hope
- Gods Lake Narrows
- Gods River
- Kasabonika
- Lac Brochet
- Muskrat Dam
- Neskantaga
- Norway House
- Oxford House
- Pikangikum
- Red Lake
- Round Lake
- Sachigo Lake
- Sandy Lake
- Shamattawa
- Sioux Lookout
- Summer Beaver
- Tadoule Lake
- Thompson
- Thunder Bay
- Webequie
- Winnipeg

== Fleet ==
In November 2007, NAC Air had a fleet of 11 aircraft.

- 2 Beechcraft 100 King Air
- 1 Beechcraft A100 King Air
- 8 Pilatus PC-12/45

== See also ==
- List of defunct airlines of Canada
