= Ontario Parliament Network =

Legislative broadcaster of Ontario, Canada

Ontario Parliament Network CJOL-TV
- provincewide Ontario, primarily on cable

Ownership
- Owner: Government of Ontario; (Ontario Educational Communications Authority)
- Sister stations: TVOntario; TFO

History
- First air date: 1986
- Call sign meaning: C J Ontario Legislature

The Ontario Parliament Network (stylized ONT.PARL since 2018) is a television channel in the Canadian province of Ontario, established in 1986 to broadcast the parliamentary proceedings of the Legislative Assembly of Ontario. It is available on all cable television providers in Ontario, as well as by webcast.

When the legislature is not sitting, the network broadcasts committee hearings which take place in the Amethyst Room. Each Sunday, a compilation series called Sunday Encore rebroadcasts the highlights from the previous week. Closed captioning is also provided. The Ontario Parliament Network's coverage of Question Period is also aired from 3:00-4:00am the following morning on TVOntario stations.

When meetings are adjourned and there are no sittings, the channel plays music in full-length albums and shows pictures in and around the building with scheduled sittings and events. This music includes jazz musicians like Oscar Peterson, Moe Koffman, Ed Bickert, Lorne Lofsky and Jim Galloway, and there are also classical, Latin, flamenco and British-style brass band albums. The classical performers include guitarists Liona Boyd and Norbert Kraft, cellist Ofra Harnoy, and trumpeter Johnny Cowell. Orchestras are the Toronto Symphony Orchestra, Toronto Chamber Orchestra, and CBC Vancouver Orchestra and the brass band is the Hannaford Street Silver Band. Around Christmas time, the selection changes to Christmas-themed albums by the same people and shows pictures inside the building all decorated with Christmas garments and tree. New albums from 2021 include jazz music performed by the University of Toronto 12tet and classical music performed by Gryphon Trio and guitarist Jeffrey McFadden. The songs and names of albums are displayed when they start playing. More jazz albums and classical guitar albums have been added as of 2025. Irish fiddle music performed by the folk music group Leahy minus the vocal tracks was added in 2026.

== List of transmitters ==
In a number of small communities in Northern Ontario without cable service, TVOntario also formerly operated LPTV transmitters which broadcast the network as a conventional over-the-air signal. These transmitters operated with the call sign CJOL-TV.

As well as the service's regular programming, the transmitters also leased broadcasting time to the Wawatay Native Communications Society, a producer of First Nations television programming. In 1989, the service aired the first-ever television broadcast of a First Nations pow-wow.

In April 2012, TVOntario announced that it would be decommissioning all of its remaining analog transmitters and associated towers by October 2013 including towers that it owns, which would impact the Ontario Parliament Network, as it shares towers with TVOntario. As of December 2012, the Ontario Parliament Network only has 10 remaining over-the-air transmitters, according to Industry Canada's TV spectrum database. Previously, there had been 32 transmitters with the call sign of CJOL-TV.

Call-sign	Channel	Community	ERP (kW)	CRTC Decision	Notes
CJOL-TV-1	24	Duck Lake	0.02 kW	90-265	
CJOL-TV-2	35	Evanturel	0.02 kW	90-266	
CJOL-TV-3	21	Harris	0.02 kW	90-267	
CJOL-TV-4	29	Hawk Junction	0.02 kW	90-268	
CJOL-TV-5	36	Lac-Sainte-Thérèse	0.02 kW	90-269	
CJOL-TV-6	24	New Osnaburgh	0.02 kW	90-270	
CJOL-TV-7	31	Sultan	0.02 kW	90-271	
CJOL-TV-9	30	Brethour	0.02 kW	90-264	
CJOL-TV-10	11	Kingfisher Lake	0.005 kW	90-930	
CJOL-TV-11	21	Longlac	0.04 kW	90-931	
CJOL-TV-13	17	Slate Falls	0.02 kW	90-932	
CJOL-TV-14	27	Evansville	0.04 kW	91-1	
CJOL-TV-15	11	Big Trout Lake	0.01 kW	91-1	
CJOL-TV-16	6	Deer Lake	0.005 kW	91-1	
CJOL-TV-17	11	Fort Albany	0.01 kW	91-1	
CJOL-TV-18	6	Fort Hope	0.005 kW	91-1	
CJOL-TV-19	5	Lansdowne House	0.005 kW	91-1	
CJOL-TV-20	10	Muskrat Dam	0.005 kW	91-1	
CJOL-TV-21	11	North Spirit Lake	0.005 kW	91-1	
CJOL-TV-22	23	Oba	0.02 kW	91-1	
CJOL-TV-23	12	Ogoki	0.005 kW	91-1	
CJOL-TV-24	27	Pays Plat	0.02 kW	91-1	
CJOL-TV-25	36	Pointe au Baril	0.02 kW	91-1	
CJOL-TV-26	12	Sachigo Lake	0.005 kW	91-1	
CJOL-TV-27	13	Nibinamik	0.005 kW	91-1	
CJOL-TV-28	12	Wapekeka	0.005 kW	91-1	
CJOL-TV-29	11	Weagamow Lake	0.005 kW	91-1	
CJOL-TV-30	12	Kashechewan	0.005 kW	91-844	
CJOL-TV-31	57	Kirby's Corner	0.04 kW	91-844	
CJOL-TV-32	17	Kejic Bay	0.02 kW	91-844	
CJOL-TV-33	16	Attawapiskat	0.02 kW	91-844	
CJOL-TV-34	12	Pikangikum	0.005 kW	91-844	
CJOL-TV-35	13	Poplar Hill	0.005 kW	91-844	
CJOL-TV-37	4	Sandy Lake	0.01 kW	92-156	
CJOL-TV-38	40	Wharncliffe	0.02 kW	92-232	
CJOL-TV-39	36	Kaboni	0.04 kW	92-295	
CJOL-TV-40	38	Savard	0.04 kW	92-297	Listed as channel 35 in CRTC Decision 92-297 and channel 38 in the w9wi TV database
CIOL-TV-1	33	Rat Portage	0.02 kW	90-930	
