= Wawatay Native Communications Society =

Canadian First Nations media society

Wawatay Native Communications Society (Wawatay for short) was formed in 1974 by the people of Canada's Nishnawbe Aski Nation in the Kenora and Cochrane Districts of Northern Ontario, as a source of communications technology, namely radio, television, and print media services for the Oji-Cree communities. Its mandate is to preserve the indigenous language and culture in its service area. Wawatay's general office is located in Sioux Lookout, Ontario, with bureaus in Timmins and Thunder Bay.

Wawatay's mission statement says that they are "... dedicated to using appropriate technologies to meet the communication needs of people of Aboriginal ancestry in Northern Ontario, wherever they live."

Wawatay is the primary source of news for the remote areas of Northern Ontario. The name comes from the Oji-Cree word for the aurora borealis.

== Wawatay Radio ==
The society operates two radio networks:

The Wawatay Radio Network (WRN; ᐙᐙᐦᑌ ᓇᐣᑐᐦᑕᒧᐎᐣ (Waawaate Nandotamowin); unpointed: ᐗᐗᑌ ᓇᑐᑕᒧᐎᐣ) is a network of radio stations that broadcasts news, talk, sports, local and popular music. Native language and English are both heard. In many NAN communities the local WRN transmitter is the only station that can be picked up in the community without difficulty.

WRN operates the following stations:

- 89.9 CKWT-FM Sioux Lookout, Ontario 106.7 CJWT-FM Timmins, Ontario with repeater stations:

  - 89.9 CKMT-FM Attawapiskat
  - 90.1 CFBL-FM Bearskin Lake
  - 89.9 CJPS-FM Cat Lake
  - 89.9 CKID-FM Constance Lake
  - 90.1 CKDL-FM Deer Lake
  - 90.1 CKFA-FM Fort Albany
  - 90.1 CKFS-FM Fort Severn
  - 90.1 CFKP-FM Kasabonika
  - 90.1 CKAS-FM Kashechewan
  - 90.1 CFKL-FM Kingfisher Lake
  - 89.9 CFHL-FM Lansdowne House
  - 105.1 CFMD-FM Muskrat Dam
  - 90.1 CFNP-FM Naicatchewenin
  - 89.9 CKFC-FM North Spirit Lake
  - 89.9 CKWN-FM Peawanuck/Winisk
  - 90.1 CFBY-FM Poplar Hill
  - 90.1 CFEY-FM Sachigo
  - 89.9 CHIX-FM Seine River
  - 90.1 CHBJ-FM Slate Falls
  - 89.9 CKYW-FM Summer Beaver
  - 89.9 CHIO-FM Wapekeka
  - 90.1 CHWL-FM Weagamow Lake
  - 90.1 CKPN-FM Webequie
  - 90.1 CHPM-FM Wunnumin Lake

WRN can also be heard nationwide on Bell Satellite TV channel 962.

Wahsa Radio is a network of radio stations that broadcasts educational distance learning and informational programming. The network is operated in conjunction with the Northern Nishnawbe Education Council.

Wahsa Radio is heard on the following stations:

- 91.9 CIDE-FM Sioux Lookout, Ontario with repeater stations:

  - 91.9 CIDE-1 Bearskin Lake
  - 91.9 CIDE-2 Big Trout Lake
  - 91.9 CIDE-3 Cat Lake
  - 91.9 CIDE-4 Deer Lake
  - 91.9 CIDE-5 Fort Severn
  - 91.9 CIDE-6 Kasabonika
  - 91.9 CIDE-21 Keewaywin
  - 91.9 CIDE-7 Kingfisher Lake
  - 91.9 CIDE-8 Lac Seul
  - 91.9 CIDE-9 Muskrat Dam
  - 91.9 CIDE-10 North Spirit Lake
  - 91.9 CIDE-11 Osnaburgh
  - 91.9 CIDE-12 Pikangikum
  - 91.9 CIDE-13 Poplar Hill
  - 91.9 CIDE-14 Sachigo
  - 91.9 CIDE-15 Sandy Lake
  - 91.9 CIDE-16 Slate Falls
  - 91.9 CIDE-17 Wapekeka
  - 91.9 CIDE-18 Weagamow Lake
  - 91.9 CIDE-20 Webequie
  - 91.9 CIDE-19 Wunnumin Lake

Wahsa Radio can also be heard nationwide on Bell Satellite TV channel 972.

== Wawatay TV ==
Wawatay TV produces aboriginal TV productions which air nationally on the Aboriginal Peoples Television Network. The service also formerly leased time from the Ontario Parliament Network on its system of over-the-air transmitters in remote Northern Ontario communities.

Wawatay Television has produced many documentaries, children's programs such as Wawatay Kids TV, and outdoor shows.

== Wawatay News ==
Wawatay News (ᐙᐙᐦᑌ ᐋᒋᒧᐎᓇᐣ (Waawaate Aajimowinan); unpointed: ᐗᐗᑌ ᐊᒋᒧᐏᓇᐣ) and its digital version Wawatay News Online (ᐙᐙᐦᑌ ᐋᒋᒧᐎᓇᐣ ᐲᐙᐱᐦᑯᐣᐠ (Waawaate Aajimowinan Biiwaabikong); unpointed: ᐗᐗᑌ ᐊᒋᒧᐎᓇᐣ ᐱᐗᐱᑯᐠ) is a semi-monthly newspaper. According to Wawatay, the newspaper is in a tabloid format, distributed free to the residents of 93 First Nations in Northern Ontario. It is also sold via newsstand dealer to many other communities in Northern Ontario with a subscription rate for readers outside of the general circulation territory. Total circulation is 9,300 copies with a reading audience of over 58,000 Aboriginal people.
