= Media in Peterborough, Ontario =

This is a list of media in Peterborough, Ontario, Canada.

== Radio ==
In addition to Peterborough's own radio market, some (but not all) radio stations from the Greater Toronto Area can also be heard in the area. Peterborough is in an unusual position in this respect; the city has more radio stations of its own than some larger cities, such as Oshawa or Brampton, which are located in the Toronto market.

Frequency	Call sign	Branding	Format	Owner	Notes
FM 89.3	CJLF-FM-2	Life 100.3	Christian/talk/Christian Music	Trust Communications	Rebroadcasts CJLF-FM Barrie.
FM 90.5	CJMB-FM	FREQ 90.5	Modern rock	My Broadcasting Corporation	New in 2013
FM 92.7	CFFF-FM	Trent Radio	Community radio	Trent Radio	
FM 93.3	CKSG-FM	93.3 myFM	adult contemporary	My Broadcasting Corporation	Licensed to Cobourg
FM 96.7	CJWV-FM	Oldies 96.7	oldies	My Broadcasting Corporation	Formerly Magic 96.7
FM 98.7	CBCP-FM	CBC Radio One	News/Talk (Public broadcasting)	Canadian Broadcasting Corporation	Rebroadcasts CBLA-FM Toronto.
FM 99.7	CKPT-FM	Pete 99.7	Adult hits	Durham Radio	
FM 100.5	CKRU-FM	100.5 Fresh Radio	hot adult contemporary	Corus Entertainment	Formerly AM 980 CKRU.
FM 101.5	CKWF-FM	The Wolf	active rock	Corus Entertainment	
FM 103.1	CFMX-FM	Classical 103.1 FM	Classical	Zoomer Media	Licensed to Cobourg
FM 103.9	CBBP-FM	CBC Music	Music variety	Canadian Broadcasting Corporation	Rebroadcasts CBL-FM Toronto
FM 105.1	CKXP-FM	KX105	country music	Durham Radio	
FM 106.3	CJBC-5-FM	Ici Radio-Canada Première	News/Talk (Public broadcasting)	Canadian Broadcasting Corporation	French, rebroadcasts CJBC Toronto
FM 107.9	CHUC-FM	Classic Rock 107.9	classic rock	My Broadcasting Corporation	Licensed to Cobourg

=== Internet Radio ===
- Radio Free Peterborough is a 12-year old internet radio station from Peterborough.
- Pet Rock Radio Network is an online internet radio station from Peterborough.

== Television ==
Peterborough is home to a local television station, CHEX-DT, a Global O&O owned by Corus Entertainment, and a local cable only station, TV Cogeco, which is owned and operated by Cogeco cable, and provided as a service to local cable subscribers. CHEX is one of the oldest broadcasting television stations in Canada. Founders included writer Robertson Davies and his father William Rupert Davies. The transmitter tower for CHEX Peterborough is on Television Hill on the east side of the city and is used to broadcast both television and radio.

DTV channel	Call sign	Network	Notes
12 (PSIP 12.1)	CHEX-DT	Global	Local Global outlet, as Global Peterborough
27 (PSIP 27.1)	CIII-TV-27	Global	Rebroadcaster of CIII-DT Toronto (Global Toronto)
35 (PSIP 54.1)	CFTO-DT-54	CTV	Rebroadcaster of CFTO-DT Toronto

== Newspapers ==
The Peterborough Examiner is the regional daily newspaper, and one of the area's original local publishers. From 1942 to 1955, it was both owned and edited by renowned Canadian author Robertson Davies, who resided in the city. In the late 1980s, the tabloid-style Peterborough This Week entered the market, taking a large share of advertising away from the Examiner. Peterborough This Week is a free newspaper delivered to most homes in Peterborough County. Alternatively, Arthur and The Absynthe are student newspapers funded and produced by Trent University students. They are distributed at no cost on the university campus and in the downtown area. The first issue of The Wire Megazine was published in 1989. The tabloid continues to publish monthly and is one of the country's oldest independent alternative presses. It is free and available throughout the Kawarthas and enjoys a wide range of advertisers and readers.

== Websites ==
Radio Free Peterborough is a 100% Volunteer-run Internet Radio project founded in 2004 in partnership with Trent Radio 92.7 CFFF FM - playing an all-Peterborough catalogue of nearly 13,000 tracks with over 85,000 hours of FM Broadcast time in Peterborough and surrounding area.

Pet Rock Radio is an online alternative radio station based in Peterborough, with a satellite division in Regina, Saskatchewan.

PTBOMEDIA @ptbomedia is an Instagram-based news service featuring National, Provincial and Peterborough Municipal News.

The KnowAboutNetwork is an international online business directory; its Peterborough website provides an opportunity to post local events. Electriccitylive.ca offers information about music events in the Peterborough area.
