= Windigo First Nations Council =

Tribal council in Ontario, Canada

Coordinates: 50°5′58″N 91°54′2″W

Windigo First Nations Council is a non-political Chiefs Council in northwestern Ontario, Canada, serving its member First Nations. The council was organized in 1983. The organization is directed by the Chiefs of the member First Nations who form the Board of Directors. Like many of the regional tribal councils, Windigo First Nations Council is a member of the Nishnawbe Aski Nation.

== Departments ==
- Economic Development
- Education
- Finance
- Musslewhite
- Health
- Windigo Community Development Corporation
- Policy
- Technical

== History ==
- August, 1977: Windigo Lake Transportation Company was established by Bearskin Lake First Nation, Muskrat Dam Lake First Nation, North Caribou Lake First Nation and Sachigo Lake First Nation to build winter roads to benefit the four First Nations.
- 1979: the scope of the company expanded in its range of projects undertaken and services provided to the communities and to reflect this change, the company became the Windigo Project Development Area.
- 1983: the Windigo Tribal Council was established. Shortly afterwards, Slate Falls, Cat Lake and Mishkeegogamang First Nations joined the Council.
- 1985: Ojibway Nation of Saugeen First Nation joined.
- 1988: Muskrat Dam left the Council.
- 1993: Mishkeegogamang left the Council.
- December 1994: Koocheching First Nation was recognized as an associate member of the Council — associate members received limited services delivery and participation in the Council.
- 1995: Saugeen withdrew from membership in all political organizations, including Windigo First Nations Council.
- 2000: Whitewater Lake First Nation joined the Council.

== Member First Nations ==
Current members

- Bearskin Lake First Nation^{‡}
- Cat Lake First Nation
- Koocheching First Nation
- North Caribou Lake First Nation^{‡}
- Sachigo Lake First Nation^{‡}
- Slate Falls First Nation
- Whitewater First Nation

Former members

- Mishkeegogamang First Nation
- Muskrat Dam Lake First Nation^{‡}
- Ojibway Nation of Saugeen First Nation

^{‡} founding First Nations
