= CKZY-FM =

First Nations community radio station in Lac Seul, Ontario

Coordinates: 50.2916°N 92.3032°W

- Lac Seul, Ontario; Canada
- Frequency: 90.3 MHz

Ownership
- Owner: Lac Seul First Nation

History
- First air date: 1992
- Former frequencies: 89.9 MHz

Technical information
- ERP: 10 watts
- HAAT: 12 metres (39 ft)

Links
- Website: lacseulfn.org/business/business-directory/ckyz-90-3fm/

CKZY-FM is a First nations community radio station that operates at 90.3 FM in Lac Seul, Ontario.

Owned by Lac Seul Radio, the station was given approval by the Canadian Radio-television and Telecommunications Commission in 1992. At some point, CKZY-FM moved from 89.9 MHz to 90.3 MHz.

== See also ==
- Wawatay
