= CKHA-FM =

Radio station in Haliburton, Ontario

Coordinates: 45°07′00″N 78°29′57″W

- Haliburton, Ontario; Canada
- Broadcast area: Haliburton County
- Frequency: 100.9 MHz
- Branding: Canoe FM

Programming
- Format: community radio

History
- First air date: 2003

Technical information
- Class: A
- ERP: 3,400 watts horizontal polarization only
- HAAT: 133.2 metres (437 ft)

Links
- Website: www.canoefm.com

CKHA-FM is a Canadian radio station, which airs at 100.9 FM in Haliburton, Ontario. The station operates a community radio format branded as Canoe FM.

== History ==
On February 10, 2003, the Haliburton County Community Radio Association received Canadian Radio-television and Telecommunications Commission (CRTC) approval to operate a new English-language FM community radio station at 100.9 MHz in Haliburton, Ontario, which signed on in July 2003. The station is operated by volunteers as a not-for-profit station, with programming designed for full-time, part-time and seasonal residents of Haliburton County.

On November 27, 2023, Haliburton County Community Radio Association applied to the CRTC to add a new low-power FM transmitter at Minden, Ontario to rebroadcast the programming of CKHA-FM Haliburton at 97.1 MHz with an effective radiated power of 27 watts. The CRTC approved Haliburton County Community Radio Association's application to operate a new transmitter at 97.1 MHz in Minden on May 8, 2024.

== Transmitters ==
Rebroadcasters of CKHA-FM
City of licence	Identifier	Frequency	Power	Class	RECNet	CRTC Decision
Minden	CKHA-FM-1	97.1 FM	27 watts	LP	Query	2024-98
