= Killaloe, Ontario =

Village in Ontario, Ontario

Coordinates: 45.5645°N 77.4196°W

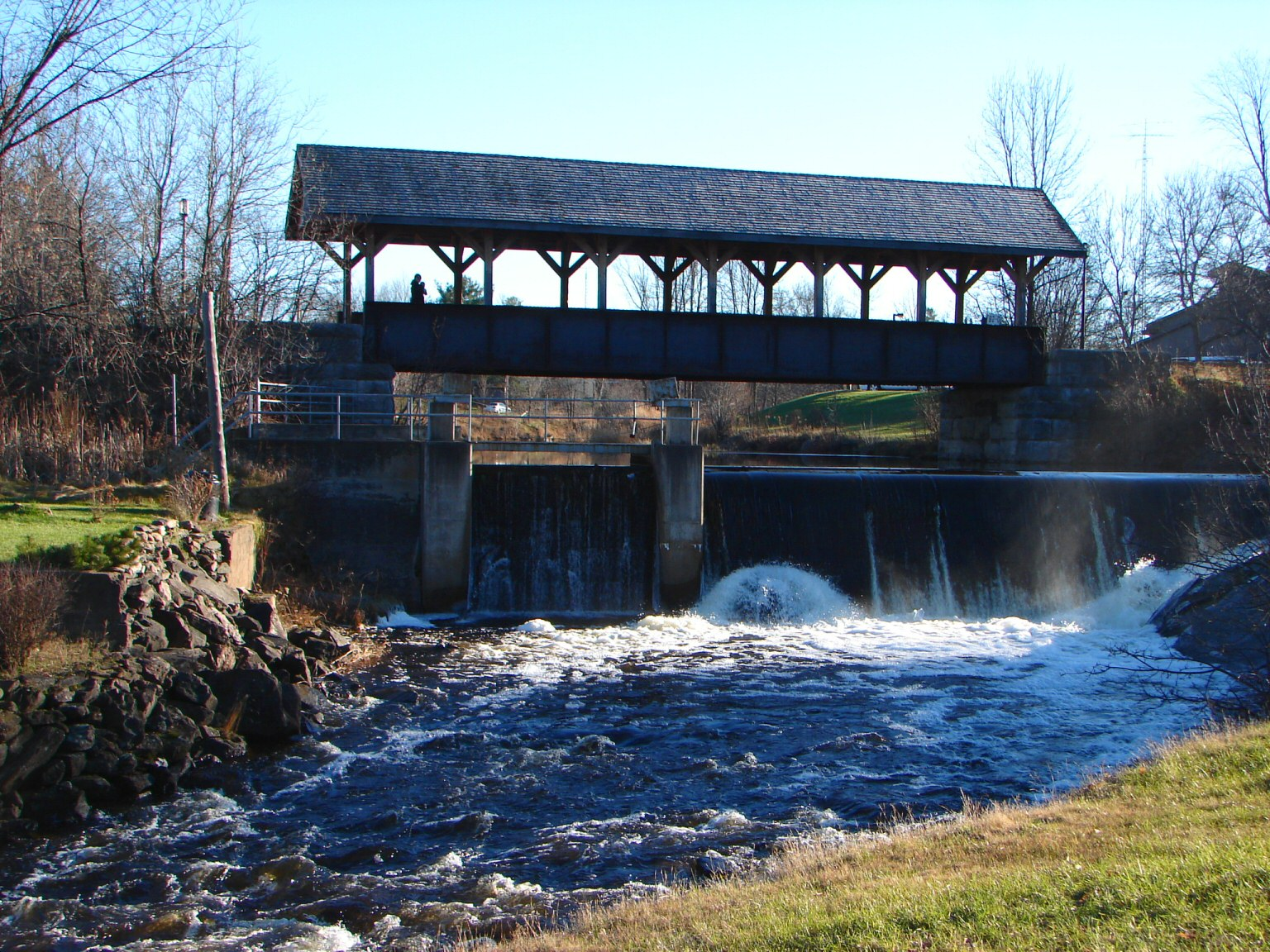
Brennans Creek in Killaloe, Ontario.

Killaloe is a town located in Renfrew County, Ontario, Canada, in the township of Killaloe, Hagarty and Richards. Geographically it is located in Eastern Ontario. The shores of Golden Lake are located 3 km (1.9 mi) to the east, which is well known for quality angling and year-round recreation. The present day town is located about 1 km (0.62 mi) north of the former townsite of "Old Killaloe". In 2001, the town had a population of 660 (all data after that is available only for the overall township).

== History ==
The name Killaloe (pronounced "KILL-a-LOO") hails from a community of the same name in Ireland and salutes the Irish heritage of many of the first settlers to this area, who came to Canada in the early 19th century seeking a better life. The early beginnings of this little town centred on the lumber trade. Built in 1849, and rebuilt in 1870 after a devastating fire, the mill at Old Killaloe harnessed waterpower to grind grain for area residents up to 1930, and planed lumber until the 1960s. In those days it was known as Fort McDonnell, but it became known as Killaloe Station circa 1868 when the Ottawa, Arnprior and Parry Sound Railway was expanding at a furious pace through the rugged countryside of the Madawaska Valley in response to the demands of the lumber industry.

In 1854 the construction of the Opeongo Line brought settlers and the logging industry to this area which originally had been occupied by the Algonquins. The Algonquin in the area still continue an ongoing land claim which covers the entire region. A majority of the settlers were French Canadians and Irish Catholic immigrants but among them were Poles, Kashubians and Germans as well.

With the railroad construction essentially finished, and the forestry industry declining many of the people took to farming. Unfortunately the soil was poor. Rocky land and short growing seasons meant that many farms failed. The population went into a steady decline which has only leveled off in the past few decades.

Today the lumber industry is still important to the livelihood of many in the surrounding communities. Both large and small logging operations and sawmills still support the local economy even though the railway no longer runs through the village. The last passenger train rolled through in 1962, and in 1968 the train station was torn down. Killaloe still maintains a flavour of the turn of the century in many of the commercial buildings which are more than 100 years old.

For years, Killaloe was known across Canada for its radio and weather station, which operated here from 1938 to 1972 as part of a country-wide chain of sites designed for aircraft communication. The site was a frost pocket with nightly minimum temperatures among the coldest in eastern Canada. A small airstrip operated at the weather station until 1953 before services were moved to neighbouring Bonnechere.

In May 2014, the founders of BeaverTails Grant and Pam Hooker officially titled Killaloe as the birthplace of the BeaverTails.

== Demographics ==
In the 2021 Census of Population conducted by Statistics Canada, Killaloe had a population of 487 living in 246 of its 274 total private dwellings, a change of −18% from its 2016 population of 594. With a land area of 6.69 km^{2} (2.58 sq mi), it had a population density of 72.8/km^{2} (188.5/sq mi) in 2021.

== Media ==
Killaloe has a community radio station called CHCR-FM (Canadian Homegrown Community Radio) that signed on the air in 1998. It was Killaloe's first local radio station in the area.
