= CFOB-FM =

Radio station in Ontario, Canada

- Fort Frances, Ontario; Canada
- Broadcast area: Rainy River District, Ontario; Koochiching County, Minnesota
- Frequency: 93.1 MHz
- Branding: 93.1 The Border

Programming
- Format: Classic hits
- Affiliations: CBC Dominion (1944–1962); CBC Radio (1962–1963)

Ownership
- Owner: Acadia Broadcasting; (Northwoods Broadcasting Limited)

History
- First air date: 1944
- Former call signs: CKFI (1944–1955)
- Former frequencies: 1340 kHz (1944–1952); 800 kHz (1952–1984); 640 kHz (1984–2002)

Technical information
- Class: B
- ERP: 21,000 watts
- HAAT: 81.4 metres (267 ft)
- Transmitter coordinates: 48°36′10.0″N 93°26′52.0″W

Links
- Webcast: Listen Live
- Website: 931theborder.ca

CFOB-FM is a classic hits formatted radio station licensed to Fort Frances, Ontario, Canada, serving the Rainy River District, Ontario, in Canada and Koochiching County, Minnesota, in the United States. CFOB-FM is owned and operated by Acadia Broadcasting.

== History ==
The station was launched in 1944 as AM 1340 CKFI, an affiliate of the Canadian Broadcasting Corporation's Dominion Network, it was owned by local businessman J. G. McLaren. The station moved to 800 in 1952, and adopted the CFOB callsign in 1955.

The station was acquired by Fawcett Broadcasting, in 1960. Fawcett sold the station to Border Broadcasting in 1966, but reacquired it in 1971. The station transferred its affiliation to the main CBC Radio network when the Dominion Network dissolved in 1962. It remained an affiliate of the CBC until 1973 when the CBC-owned CBQ opened.

In 1984, the station moved to 640. In 1989, the station began airing programming from CKIS in Winnipeg during the overnight hours.

In 2001, Fawcett Broadcasting Limited received CRTC approval to convert CFOB to FM and officially moved to 93.1 in 2002.

The station was acquired in 2007 by Acadia Broadcasting based in Saint John, New Brunswick.

On June 8, 2010, CFOB applied to use the rebroadcasting transmitter CKDR-6-AM Atikokan to broadcast the programming of CFOB-FM instead of the programming of CKDR-2-FM in Sioux Lookout. The CRTC approved the plan on August 19, 2010. Community leaders in Atikokan said their community has stronger ties to Fort Frances, than to Dryden. The call sign for Atikokan's AM repeater became CFOB-1.

On August 25, 2011, CFOB-FM applied to convert Atitkokan's AM repeater CFOB-1 1240 to 95.9 MHz. This application was approved by the CRTC on November 15, 2011.

CFOB "tinkered" with its format, going from Adult Contemporary to a mix of AC and Classic Hits, around New Year's 2012. It's similar to the format used by its sister station in Kenora. CFOB also changed its branding from "B93" to "The Border," reflecting its international coverage.

On January 24, 2012, CFOB-1 1240 in Atikokan left the air and returned to the air on its new frequency at 95.9 FM as CFOB-1-FM.

The station changed to a classic hits format on February 24, 2023.

== Translator ==
In addition to the main station, CFOB-FM is relayed by an FM translator to widen its broadcast area.

Rebroadcasters of CFOB-FM
City of licence	Identifier	Frequency	Power	RECNet
Atikokan	CFOB-1-FM	95.9 FM	50 watts	Query

== See also ==
- CFOB-FM at The History of Canadian Broadcasting by the Canadian Communications Foundation
