= CFDY-FM =

Radio station in Cochrane, Ontario, Canada

Coordinates: 49°3′59″N 81°1′21″W

- Cochrane, Ontario; Canada
- Frequency: 104.7 FM
- Branding: CPBR Cochrane 104.7 fm

Programming
- Format: community radio

Ownership
- Owner: Cochrane Polar Bear Club

Technical information
- Class: LP
- ERP: 50 watts
- HAAT: 29.6 metres (97 ft)

Links
- Website: CPBR website

CFDY-FM is a Canadian radio station that broadcasts a community radio format on 104.7 FM in Cochrane, Ontario.

== History ==
In November 2007, an application by the Cochrane Polar Bear Radio Club, to operate a new community FM radio station at Cochrane was denied. The Cochrane Polar Bear Radio Club reapplied in January 2008 and received approval to operate the station on 104.7 MHz with 5 watts of power on August 1, 2008.

The station, CFDY-FM is owned by the Cochrane Polar Bear Radio Club. The callsign for meaning for CFDY is "Douglas W. Young", the program director of the station.

On December 13, 2010, the Cochrane Polar Bear Radio Club applied to operate a new FM radio station at Cochrane on the frequency of 104.7 MHz. This application to operate the new station at Cochrane received CRTC approval on April 20, 2011.

On January 28, 2011, the Cochrane Polar Bear Radio Club applied to operate a new FM radio station at Smooth Rock Falls, Ontario on the frequency of 88.5 MHz and received approval on November 10, 2011. The callsign for 88.5 FM at Smooth Rock Falls will be CHDY-FM.

On July 2, 2024, Joel Lagacé, on behalf of a non-profit corporation to be incorporated, submitted an application to the CRTC for a new English language developmental community FM radio station in Cochrane, Ontario which would operate on 104.7 MHz (channel 284) with an average and maximum effective radiated power (ERP) of 5 watts (non-directional antenna with an effective height of antenna above average terrain [EHAAT] of 38.5 metres). Joel Lagacé's application was approved on March 11, 2025.
