= CKBK-FM =

First Nations radio station in Thamesville, Ontario

Coordinates: 42°33′51.12″N 81°52′27.84″W

- Thamesville, Ontario; Canada
- Broadcast area: Moraviantown, Ontario
- Frequency: 104.3 MHz
- Branding: The Buck

Programming
- Languages: English, Lenape, Munsee
- Format: First Nations, community radio

Ownership
- Owner: Lenape Community Radio Society

History
- First air date: January 30, 2012

Technical information
- Class: LP
- ERP: 50 watts

Links
- Website: delawarenation.on.ca

CKBK-FM is a low-power FM radio station which broadcasts a First Nations community radio programming on the frequency 104.3 MHz in Thamesville, Ontario, Canada.

Owned by Lenape Community Radio Society, the station received Canadian Radio-television and Telecommunications Commission (CRTC) approval on April 14, 2011.

The station began testing on January 30, 2012, and officially launched in April 2012.

== Technical issues ==
Thamesville is located more than 90 km (56 mi) from Detroit, Michigan. Since the newly launched Thamesville station operates on 104.3 MHz with only 50 watts, there are possibilities that the new First Nations community radio station may receive co-channel interference from a significantly much higher powered 190,000-watt FM radio station, WOMC, which operates at 104.3 MHz from its transmitter in Ferndale, Michigan.
