= CFRZ-FM =

First Nations community radio station in Walpole Island, Ontario, Canada

Coordinates: 42°35′26.16″N 82°28′37.92″W

CFRZ-FM is a radio station which broadcasts a First Nations community radio format on the frequency of 98.3 MHz (FM) in Walpole Island, Ontario, Canada.

== History ==
On November 4, 2011, Director of Operations of Walpole Island First Nation Radio received an approval from the Canadian Radio-television and Telecommunications Commission (CRTC) to operate a new First Nations community radio station at Walpole Island.
