= CHCR-FM =

Community radio station in Killaloe, Ontario

- Killaloe, Ontario; Canada
- Frequency: 102.9 MHz
- Branding: Canadian Homegrown Community Radio

Programming
- Format: Community radio

Ownership
- Owner: Homegrown Community Radio

History
- First air date: 1998

Technical information
- Licensing authority: CRTC
- ERP: 33 watts
- HAAT: 20.5 metres (67 ft)
- Transmitter coordinates: 45°33′18″N 77°24′56″W
- Repeater: 104.5 CHCR-FM-1 (Wilno)

CHCR-FM is a community radio station broadcasting at 102.9 FM in Killaloe, Ontario, with a repeater at 104.5 FM in Wilno, known as Canadian Homegrown Community Radio.

The station began broadcasting in 1998 at 102.9 FM and later added a rebroadcast transmitter at Wilno on 104.5 FM in 2003.

In August 2023, it was announced that the radio station, CHCR-FM, is at risk of shutting down due to lack of volunteers. CHCR-FM is looking for volunteers to keep the radio station on the air.
