= CKOL-FM =

Radio station in Campbellford, Ontario

Coordinates: 44°18′32″N 77°48′17″W

- Campbellford, Ontario; Canada
- Broadcast area: Trent Hills and adjacent communities
- Frequency: 93.7 MHz

Programming
- Format: Community Radio

Ownership
- Owner: Campbellford Community Radio Association

History
- First air date: 1992

Technical information
- Class: A
- Power: 500 watts vertical polarization only
- HAAT: 41.5 meters (136 ft)
- Repeater: 100.7 CKOL-FM-1 (Madoc)

Links
- Website: www.ckol.ca

CKOL-FM is a community radio station broadcasting at 93.7 FM in Campbellford, Ontario, Canada, with a repeater, CKOL-FM-1 100.7 located in Madoc.

Since its first broadcast in 1992, this vibrant community radio station has been serving the Municipality of Trent Hills and the surrounding area with great music and tireless promotion of local talent, business and events. The station has grown over the years, boosting its power from 50 to 500 watts and adding a sister station in Madoc.

All musical genres are represented from A to Z (Alternate country to Zydeco). Listeners enjoy big band, blues, bluegrass, country, Celtic, easy listening, folk, gospel, jazz, pop, R&B, rock, rock 'n roll and contemporary releases featuring both international and local musicians. As well, CKOL broadcasts live from community events and meetings and covers community and local council news on a daily basis.

CKOL has been designated the official Emergency Information station for the Municipality of Trent Hills Communications System in the event of an emergency requiring public bulletins and ongoing coverage.

== History ==
In 1988, Trent Valley Broadcasting Inc. was denied a license to operate a new community FM radio station on the frequency of 98.7 MHz with 50 watts of power and was denied again in 1990 to operate at 98.7 MHz with 1,000 watts.

On June 12, 1992, Campbellford Area Radio Association received approval from the Canadian Radio-television and Telecommunications Commission (CRTC) to broadcast community-oriented programming and local events during the tourist season in the months of July and August 1992 at 98.7 MHz with 50 watts. Trent Valley also received approval on November 30, 1992, to operate fulltime on the frequency FM 98.7 MHz.

In 1999, the station moved from its original 98.7 MHz frequency to 93.5 MHz. The 98.7 FM frequency is currently being occupied by CBCP-FM out of Peterborough, Ontario.

On July 25, 2000, Campbellford Area Radio Association submitted an application to increase CKOL-FM's power from 50 watts to 1,038 watts on its 93.5 MHz frequency. The station later withdrew its application.

In 2001, CKOL-FM moved from 93.5 to 93.7 FM increasing their effective radiated power from 50 to 500 watts.

In July, 2006, the station was given approval by the CRTC to operate a low-power transmitter at Madoc on 100.7 FM with an ERP of 49.3 watts. The station set up a studio above Wilson's of Madoc to offer local programming developed by local volunteers in Madoc separate from CKOL-FM Campbellford. The transmitter and antenna were on the Madoc water tower.

In 2017, the Campbellford community radio station celebrated its 25 years of broadcasting.
