= CFRH-FM =

Francophone radio station in Ontario, Canada

Coordinates: 44°28′42″N 80°19′36″W

- Penetanguishene, Ontario; Canada
- Broadcast area: Central Ontario
- Frequency: 88.1 MHz
- Branding: CFRH

Programming
- Language: French
- Format: Community radio

Ownership
- Owner: Radio-Huronie; (La Clé d'la Baie en Huronie, Association Culturelle Francophone)

History
- First air date: 1988
- Call sign meaning: Canada Français Radio Huronie

Technical information
- Class: C1
- ERP: 8.6 kW average 40 kW peak horizontal polarization only
- HAAT: 274 metres (899 ft)
- Repeater: CFRH-1 106.7 Barrie

Links
- Website: radiocfrh.ca

CFRH-FM is a Canadian radio station, broadcasting at 88.1 FM in Penetanguishene, Ontario. Owned and operated by the Radio-Huronie cooperative, it is a non-profit French-language community radio station for the region's Franco-Ontarian community.

== History ==
The station was licensed by the Canadian Radio-television and Telecommunications Commission in 1988. The cooperative had previously produced some community programming for broadcast on CJBC's Penetanguishene rebroadcaster.

CFRH-FM originally began broadcasting a 10-watt signal on 101.9 FM, along with rebroadcasters on 88.1 FM in Midland, 89.7 FM in Perkinsfield and 101.9 FM in Lafontaine. In 1999, the station was given approval to move to its current frequency, along with a power increase to 4,493 watts. As a result of the power increase, the station no longer needed to maintain the additional transmitters.

In 2005, the station was licensed to increase its transmitter strength from 4.4 to 8.6 kW.

On January 16, 2013, the station submitted an application to add a new FM transmitter at Barrie, which would operate at 106.7 MHz with an ERP of 175 watts (non-directional antenna with an EHAAT of 85.5 metres). This application was approved on November 1, 2013.

Undated, CFRH-FM was branded as Vague FM (meaning Wave FM in English).

In May 2019, CFRH-FM changed its branding from Vague FM (Wave FM) back to using its CFRH call letters.

The station is a member of the Alliance des radios communautaires du Canada.

== Former logos ==
Vague FM logo used until 2019.
