= CKDR-FM =

Radio station in Dryden, Ontario

Coordinates: 49°47′02″N 92°48′25″W

- Dryden, Ontario; Canada
- Broadcast area: Northwestern Ontario
- Frequency: 92.7 MHz
- Branding: CKDR

Programming
- Format: Adult contemporary

Ownership
- Owner: Acadia Broadcasting

History
- First air date: August 1963
- Former frequencies: 900 kHz (AM) (1963–1984); 800 kHz (1984–2005)
- Call sign meaning: DR for Dryden

Technical information
- Class: B
- ERP: vertical polarization: 17 kW horizontal polarization: 39 kW
- HAAT: 87.2 metres (286 ft)

Links
- Webcast: Listen Live
- Website: yoursunsetcountry.ca

CKDR-FM is a radio station in Dryden, Ontario, Canada. The station broadcasts an adult contemporary format at 92.7 FM.

CKDR also has rebroadcasters in Ear Falls, Hudson, Ignace, Red Lake and Sioux Lookout.

== History ==
CKDR was launched in 1963 on its original frequency of 900 kHz. In 1979, Fawcett Broadcasting was given approval to add rebroadcast transmitters for CKDR at Ear Falls, Hudson, and Sioux Lookout, while a transmitter was added to Red Lake in 1980.

CKDR moved to 800 kHz in 1984 and remained there until November 8, 2005, when the station converted to 92.7 MHz.

== Rebroadcasters ==
Rebroadcasters of CKDR-FM
| City of licence | Identifier | Frequency | Power | Class | RECNet | CRTC Decision |
|---|---|---|---|---|---|---|
| Ignace | CKDR-FM-1 | 97.5 FM | 50 watts | LP | Query | 2014-287 |
| Sioux Lookout | CKDR-2-FM | 97.1 FM | 166 watts | A | Query | |
| Hudson | CKDR-FM-3 | 97.5 FM | 27 watts | LP | Query | 2019-62 |
| Ear Falls | CKDR-FM-4 | 97.5 FM | 50 watts | LP | Query | |
| Red Lake | CKDR-5-FM | 97.1 FM | 420 watts | A | Query | |

In 1977, CKDR received approval for a 50 watt rebroadcaster at Ignace, to operate on 1340 kHz with a call sign CKIG.

On June 27, 1979, CKDR received approval to add rebroadcast transmitters at Ear Falls (CKEF 1490 kHz, 40 watts), Hudson (CKHD 1450 kHz, 40 watts), and Sioux Lookout (CKSI 1400 kHz, 50 watts).

On January 15, 1980, Fawcett Broadcasting received approval to operate a new FM transmitter at Red Lake on the frequency of 99.5 MHz with the callsign CKRE. In 1981, it was changed to 1340 kHz on the AM band as the CRTC originally approved to operate an FM transmitter at Red Lake but the use of the FM band in the area was too low at that time. On December 13, 1984, Fawcett Broadcasting received approval to increase CKRE's nighttime power from 250 watts to 1,000 watts. CKRE would later become CKDR-5.

In 1981, CKEF Ear Falls was authorized to change frequencies from 1490 kHz to 1450 kHz.

During the 1980s, rebroadcasters CKIG, CKEF, CKHD and CKSI would all adopt the CKDR callsign.

In 2006, CKDR was given approval by the CRTC to convert CKDR-2 and CKDR-5 to 97.1 MHz to replace the AM signals. In December 2007, the Sioux Lookout repeater was converted to 97.1 FM. In the fall of 2008 the Red Lake AM repeater was also converted to 97.1 MHz.

On June 8, 2010, co-owned CFOB-FM Fort Frances applied to use the rebroadcasting transmitter CKDR-6 Atikokan to rebroadcast CFOB-FM instead of CKDR-2-FM Sioux Lookout. The CRTC approved the plan on August 19, 2010. Community leaders in Atikokan said their community has stronger ties to Fort Frances, than to Dryden. The 50-Watt rebroadcaster and an FM CBC Radio One transmitter (CBQI-FM 90.1) provide the only local radio reception in Atikokan, which has a population of about 3,300.

On June 2, 2014, CKDR received approval from the CRTC to convert CKDR-1 Ignace to 97.5 MHz with the effective radiated power of 50 watts.

On November 27, 2015, CKDR submitted an application to convert CKDR-4 to 97.5 MHz. This was approved on March 9, 2016.

CKDR-3 Hudson was the last AM transmitter to rebroadcast CKDR-FM Dryden. On December 18, 2018, Acadia Broadcasting has applied to convert CKDR-3 to 97.5 MHz. This application to move CKDR-3 to FM was approved by the CRTC on March 5, 2019. CKDR shut down its last AM transmitter at 1450 kHz in Hudson and moved to its new FM frequency at 97.5 MHz in August 2019.
