= CJLF-FM =

Christian radio station in Barrie, Ontario

Coordinates: 44°31′55″N 79°39′44″W

- Barrie, Ontario; Canada
- Broadcast area: Central Ontario
- Frequency: 100.3 MHz
- Branding: Life 100.3

Programming
- Format: Contemporary Christian music

Ownership
- Owner: Trust Communications Ministries, Inc.

History
- First air date: August 15, 1999
- Call sign meaning: Christ Jesus Life

Technical information
- Class: C1
- ERP: 15.3 kW average 32.8 kW peak
- HAAT: 248.6 metres (816 ft)

Links
- Website: lifeonline.fm

CJLF-FM is a Canadian radio station, broadcasting a Contemporary Christian music format on 100.3 FM in Barrie, Ontario. Using the on-air brand name Life 100.3, the station was founded by Scott Jackson in August 1999 and is owned by Trust Communications Ministries, Inc, which is based in Barrie, Ontario.

On August 27, 2006, CJLF-FM increased its power from 1.8 kW to 18.7 kW. The power was further increased to 40 kW in January 2007.

== Programming ==
In addition to locally oriented programming, the station has produced nationally syndicated programs like the CT-20 countdown of Christian music hits.

== Transmitters ==
Rebroadcasters of CJLF-FM
City of licence	Identifier	Frequency	Power	Class	RECNet	CRTC Decision
Huntsville	CJLF-FM-3	98.9 FM	750 watts	A	Query	2005-455
Owen Sound	CJLF-FM-1	90.1 FM	75 watts	A1	Query	2002-415
Peterborough	CJLF-FM-2	89.3 FM	500 watts	A	Query	2003-27

== Expansion ==
Trust Communications applied twice for a new station in Kitchener-Waterloo with its own schedule and studios, but these applications were rejected in favour of CJTW-FM.

Trust Communications applied for a transmitter to serve the Inuit residents of Iqaluit, Nunavut with the first Christian station in the territory (which would rebroadcast CJLF-FM); however, this application was rejected.

On September 28, 2011, the CRTC denied Trust's application to increase CJLF-FM-1's power in Owen Sound.

On January 28, 2011, the CRTC revoked the licence of CKLN-FM for regulatory non-compliance. The decision was appealed to the Federal Court of Canada, which denied the appeal on April 15, 2011. The CRTC subsequently issued a call for applications to occupy the now-vacant 88.1 FM frequency on September 28, 2011. Trust Communications filed an application to launch a new Christian music radio station in Toronto. The CRTC rejected Trust Communication's application on September 11, 2012, in favour of a new station, CIND-FM, owned by Rock 95 FM.
