= CFFF-FM =

Radio station in Peterborough, Ontario, Canada

Coordinates: 44°19′41″N 78°17′58″W

- Peterborough, Ontario; Canada
- Frequency: 92.7 MHz
- Branding: Trent Radio

Programming
- Format: Community radio

Ownership
- Owner: Trent Radio

History
- First air date: 1984

Technical information
- Class: A
- ERP: 700 watts
- HAAT: 91.3 metres (300 ft)

Links
- Website: http://www.trentradio.ca/

CFFF-FM is a Canadian radio station, which broadcasts at 92.7 FM in Peterborough, Ontario. The broadcast facility, which uses the on-air name Trent Radio, was previously licensed as the campus radio station of the city's Trent University, but now operates under an independent community radio license. Trent Radio is producer-oriented, and features over 100 long-running and new programs from students and community members, operating over three seasons per year. All students and community members are welcome to submit applications for programming and membership.

== History ==
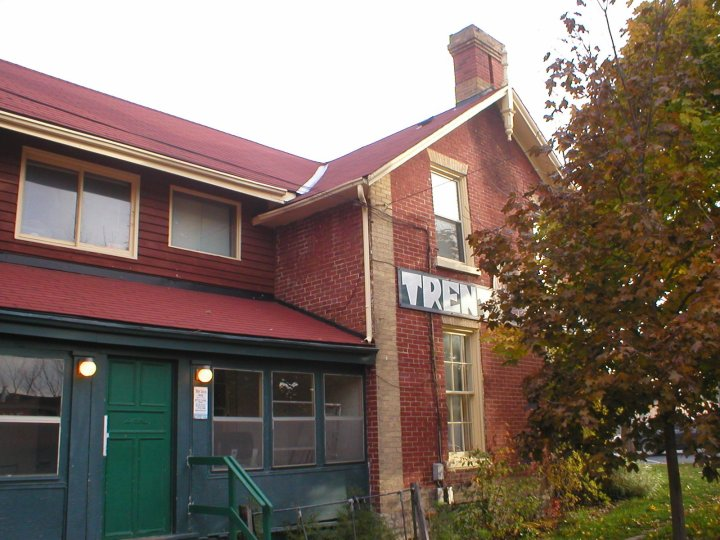
Trent Radio House

The station was founded in 1968 by Stephen Stohn (who is now a television producer of such series as Degrassi: The Next Generation), Christopher Ward (now a songwriter; work includes Alannah Myles' hit Black Velvet), and Peter Northrop. At the time the station operated only four hours per week; it now operates 24 hours per day.

In 1984, CFFF's first broadcast licence (applied for by one of Trent Radio's founding directors, John K. Muir) was given approval by the Canadian Radio-television and Telecommunications Commission (CRTC) to operate at 96.3 FM with an effective radiated power (ERP) of 30 watts. Trent Radio moved to its George Street location in 1985. Following Muir's return to Trent Radio as General Manager in 1994, the station's frequency moved to 92.7 FM in 1997 with a protected ERP of 250 watts. Trent Radio commenced internet streaming in October 2004.

On June 27, 2005, CFFF was authorized to increase effective radiated power from 250 to 700 watts and to relocate the transmitter and increase antenna height. The licensee stated that this will provide a better signal to serve Peterborough and the surrounding communities.

The station is supported by the students of Trent University, and is governed by an independent board of directors made up of students and community members, incorporated as Trent Radio. Because CRTC regulations require a campus radio station to be governed by the university it serves, the CRTC issued CFFF a new license on October 17, 2007, officially reclassifying it as a community radio station.
