= CHWR-FM =

Coordinates: 50°18′09″N 89°02′19″W

- Whitesand, Ontario; Canada
- Frequency: 89.9 MHz

Programming
- Format: First Nations community radio

Ownership
- Owner: Whitesand First Nation; (Whitesand Communication Group)

History
- First air date: 1996

Technical information
- ERP: 10 watts
- HAAT: 10 metres

CHWR-FM is a First nations community radio station that operates at 89.9 FM in Whitesand, Ontario, Canada.

Owned by Whitesand Communication Group, the station was given approval by the Canadian Radio-television and Telecommunications Commission in 1996.
