= Cat Lake First Nation =

Cat Lake 63C
- Indian reserve
- Cat Lake Indian Reserve No. 63C
- Location within Ontario Location within Canada
- Coordinates: 51°43′40″N 91°49′43″W
- Country: Canada
- Province: Ontario
- District: Kenora
- First Nation: Cat Lake

Area
  - Land: 17.04 km^{2} (6.58 sq mi)
- Elevation: 404 m (1,325 ft)

Population (2021)
  - Total: 651
  - Density: 38.1/km^{2} (99/sq mi)

Cat Lake First Nation (Ojibwe: Bizhiw-zaaga'igan, ᐱᔕᐤ ᓴᑲᐦᐃᑲᐣ) is an Ojibway First Nation reserve approximately 180 kilometres northwest of Sioux Lookout in northwestern Ontario, Canada, located on the central north shore of Cat Lake. As of 2021, their total registered population was 651 people.

Cat Lake is policed by the Nishnawbe-Aski Police Service, an Aboriginal-based service.

== History ==
The First Nation calls itself Bizhiw-zaaga'iganiwininiwag meaning "Men of Wild-cat Lake" or as Bizhiw-zaaga'iganiing Nitam Anishinaabeg meaning "The First Nation at Wild-cat Lake," where wild-cat refers to the Canada lynx.

The community of Cat Lake was originally established as a Hudson's Bay Company trading post in 1788, and later belonged to the Osnaburgh Band of Ojibwe. Then on June 22, 1970, the Cat Lake First Nation reserve was formally established.

Cat Lake First Nation was in a state of emergency due to the presence of dangerous levels of black mould in the homes. On March 14, 2019, an agreement worth $12.8 million was agreed to with the federal government to address the crisis.

The community had to be evacuated during the 2026 Canadian wildfires.

The Cat Lake reserve is within the boundaries of the territory described by the James Bay Treaty of 1905 — Treaty 9. The reserve was originally 218 ha and increased to 1771 ha in 2003 under the Government of Canada's Addition to Reserve Policy. The First Nation has reserved itself the Cat Lake 63C Indian Reserve, in which the community of Cat Lake, Ontario is located.

The community maintains strong ties with Mishkeegogamang First Nation.

== Governance ==
The Cat Lake First Nation is governed by an elected Chief, Deputy Chief, and four Councillors. The current Chief is Russell Wesley, and the Deputy Chief is Matthew Keewaykapow. The Head Councillor is Abraham Keesickquayash; the other three Councillors are Irene Gray-Oombash, Gordina D. Oombash, and Allen Sr Oombash.

The council is a member of the Windigo First Nations Council, a non-political regional chiefs' council. In turn, the Windigo First Nations Council is a member of the larger Nishnawbe Aski Nation, a Tribal Political Organisation which represents many of the First Nations in northwestern Ontario.

=== Governance history ===
The original governance system of the community was that based on the doodem-system, where the hereditary council was established by the families of the appropriate clans, overseen by a hereditary chief. However, the original governance structure for the Cat Lake peoples were altered with the 1905 Treaty 9, and then the Indian Act brought in other leaders from other areas as chiefs for the Cat Lake First Nation.

== Transportation ==
North Star Air and Slate Falls Airways run daily service on regular schedules to Cat Lake Airport. Winter/ice roads also connect from Pickle Lake, Ontario, via the Northern Ontario Resource Trail during the winter months, which takes an average 4 to 5 hours of travel.

== Official address ==
Cat Lake First Nation
PO Box 81
Cat Lake, ON P0V 1J0
