= Muskrat Dam Lake First Nation =

First Nation in Ontario, Canada

Muskrat Dam Lake
- Indian reserve
- Muskrat Dam Lake Indian Reserve
- Location within Ontario
- Coordinates: 53°22′N 91°51′W
- Country: Canada
- Province: Ontario
- District: Kenora
- First Nation: Muskrat Dam Lake

Area
  - Land: 27.4 km^{2} (10.6 sq mi)

Population (2016)
  - Total: 281
  - Density: 10.3/km^{2} (27/sq mi)

Muskrat Dam Lake First Nation (Severn Ojibwa: ᐗᒐᐡᑾᓂᒥᐠ ᓴᑲᐦᐃᑲᐣ) is an Anisininew First Nation band government in Northern Ontario. They reside on the 1,939.7 hectares (4,793.1 acres) Muskrat Dam Lake reserve, located on Muskrat Dam Lake in the Kenora District. The community of Muskrat Dam, Ontario, is located on this reserve. In June 2008, their total registered population was 387 people, of which their on-reserve population was around 195.

The reserve's primary transportation link is the Muskrat Dam Airport.

Muskrat Dam Lake is policed by the Nishnawbe-Aski Police Service, an Aboriginal-based service.

== History ==
The Muskrat Dam Lake First Nation is part of the 1929-30 Adhesion to the James Bay Treaty of 1905 - Treaty 9.

The Muskrat Dam people have historical links to the people of Bearskin Lake, and several families have relocated from Bearskin Lake to Muskrat Dam Lake. The families that relocated to Muskrat Dam were that of Tommy and Victoria Beardy, who were joined by Jeremiah and Juliet Duncan, Moses and Eunice Fiddler, Jake and Esther Beardy and Roderick and Effie Fiddler. Later, Fiddlers' son Billy and Moses Fiddler's mother Nainee also joined the little settlement.

Due to abundance of natural resources in the area, the small community started living off the land: fishing, hunting, trapping and logging. Weagamow Lake, Ontario helped them start a sawmill operation, as well as to fly in tools, gas and grocery supplies.

Until it officially gained reserve status in 1976, Muskrat Dam was a satellite community of the Big Trout Lake.

== Governance ==
The current elected leadership of the council consists of Chief Korey Day. Official Name Muskrat Dam Lake Number 213

Membership Authority Section 11 Band

- Election Type: Custom Electoral System
- Council Quorum: 3
- First Nation Officials (Term: October 08, 2026 to October 05, 2028)
  - Chief Korey Day
  - Deputy Chief Olivia Duncan
  - Councillor Seegwun Morris
  - Councillor Gabriel Fiddler
  - Councillor Charlie L Beardy
- Note: Election System - The type of system used by a First Nation in the selection of its chief and councillors (can be either under the Indian Act election system, the First Nations Elections Act, a custom system, or under the provisions of a self-governing agreement).

The First Nation is part of the [Independent First Nations Alliance] of the [Nishnawbe Aski Nation].

On September 11, 2015 that Muskrat Dam Election committee held a nomination meeting, with the majority of the 14 people in attendance voting to bar candidates who had previously resigned from seeking re-election. Three days later former Ontario regional chief Stan Beardy was declared the new chief by acclamation.

Federal judge nixed Muskrat Dam election results. Federal Court of Canada Justice Cecily Strickland ordered the results quashed with a new election to be held within six months of April 7.

Reserve Recuperates Stan Beardy, who was later confirmed as the reserve's rightful chief by a federal court, said an internal investigation has found that the fly-in community of 300 Anisininew owes about $5 million.

== Notable people ==
- Gordon Beardy - former Keewatin Bishop for the Anglican Church of Canada who was the first Native diocesan bishop in Canada; also elected and served as the First Nation's Chief in 2002.
- Darryn Morris - deadliest man of muskrat dam
