= Kitchenuhmaykoosib Inninuwug First Nation =

Kitchenuhmaykoosib Aaki 84 ᑭᐦᒋᓇᒣᑯᐦᓯᑊ ᐃᓂᓂᐧᐊᐠ
- Indian reserve
- Kitchenuhmaykoosib Aaki (Big Trout Lake) Indian Reserve No. 84
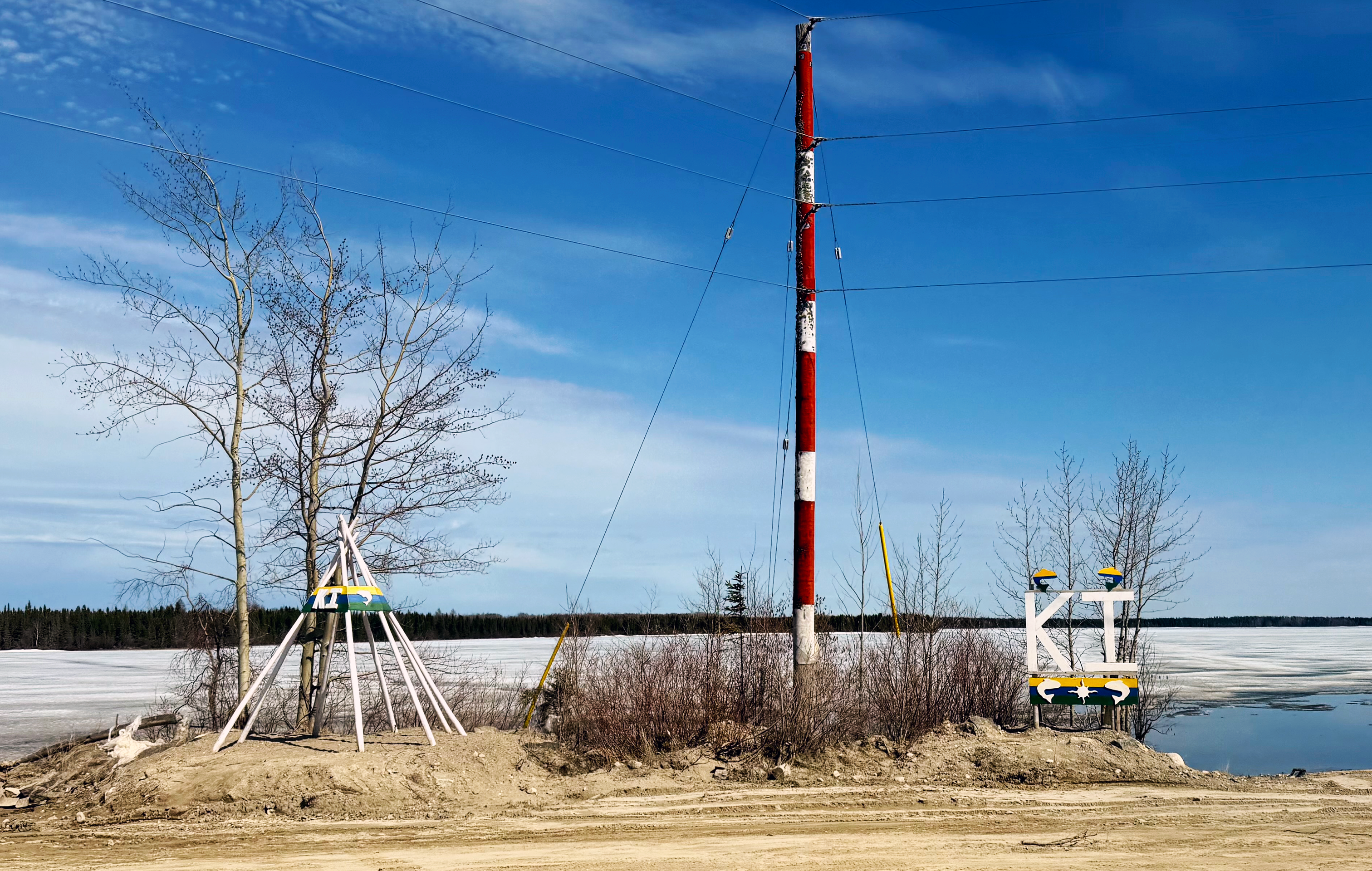

- Location within Ontario
- Coordinates: 53°49′N 89°56′W
- Country: Canada
- Province: Ontario
- District: Kenora
- First Nation: Kitchenuhmaykoosib Inninuwug

Area
  - Land: 289.96 km^{2} (111.95 sq mi)

Population (2016)
  - Total: 1,024
  - Density: 2.8/km^{2} (7.3/sq mi)
- Website: https://www.ki-btl.ca

Kitchenuhmaykoosib Inninuwug (Oji-Cree: ᑭᐦᒋᓇᒣᑯᐦᓯᑊ ᐃᓂᓂᐧᐊᐠ (Gichi-namegosib ininiwag); unpointed: ᑭᒋᓇᒣᑯᓯᑊ ᐃᓂᓂᐧᐊᐠ or ᑭᐦᒋᓇᒣᑯᐦᓯᐱᐎᓂᓂᐗᐠ (Gichi-namegosibiwininiwag); unpointed: ᑭᒋᓇᒣᑯᓯᐱᐎᓂᓂᐗᐠ), also known as Big Trout Lake First Nation or KI for short, is an Anisininew First Nation reserve in Northwestern Ontario and is a part of Treaty 9 (James Bay). The community is about 580 km (360 mi) north of Thunder Bay, Ontario.

The First Nation's land-base is a 29,937.6 ha (73,976.38 acre) Kitchenuhmaykoosib Aaki 84 Reserve, located on the north shore of Big Trout Lake. Big Trout Lake is a fly-in community, accessible by air, and winter road in the colder months.

== Background ==
Flag of Kitchenuhmaykoosib Inninuwug Emblem of the KI flag

The population of Big Trout Lake was 1,322 residents in January 2007, making it one of the largest First Nations communities in the region.

The current band chief is Donny Morris and deputy chief is Darryl Sainnawap. Current band councillors are Cecelia Begg, Joseph Mckay, Enos Mckay, Randy Nanokeesic, Bonnie Sanderson, Jack Mckaym, Luke Sharpie,

The people speak Oji-Cree (Anishininiimowin, Severn Ojibwe or Northern Ojibway) and English

When Treaty 9 was first signed in Osnaburgh, Ontario in 1905, KI was located in land that was, at the time, not considered part of Ontario but rather within the then North-Western Territory. When band members learned of the signing they sent repeated letters for treaty terms. Kitchenuhmaykoosib Inninuwug (KI) is within the boundaries of the territory described by the 1929–30 Adhesion to the James Bay Treaty of 1905 – Treaty 9. Full reserve status was granted to Big Trout Lake in 1976.

Marion Anderson, who became a band councillor for Big Trout Lake in 1950, was the first woman ever to serve as a First Nations band councillor in Ontario. She was later awarded the Order of Ontario in honour of this distinction.

The band's website describes three locally owned stores serving the community supplying groceries, clothing, fuel, and various other supplies. The community relies heavily on these businesses as The North West Company, a store frequently found with northern operations, was asked to leave by the community in 1996. The community felt that they would be better off keeping the business locally owned and operated. A post office and Canadian Imperial Bank of Commerce Agency Bank are also located in the community. There is one band-run community radio station, 100.3 FM, which broadcasts everything from public health announcements, Sunday mass, and rebroadcasts the Wawatay Native Communications Society from Sioux Lookout, Ontario.

The First Nation is policed by Big Trout Lake Police which is a force administered by the Ontario Provincial Police (OPP). There are only 19 First Nations in Ontario who operate with this agreement and only four in North-Western Ontario. The remainder are policed directly by the OPP or by the Nishnawbe-Aski Police Service.

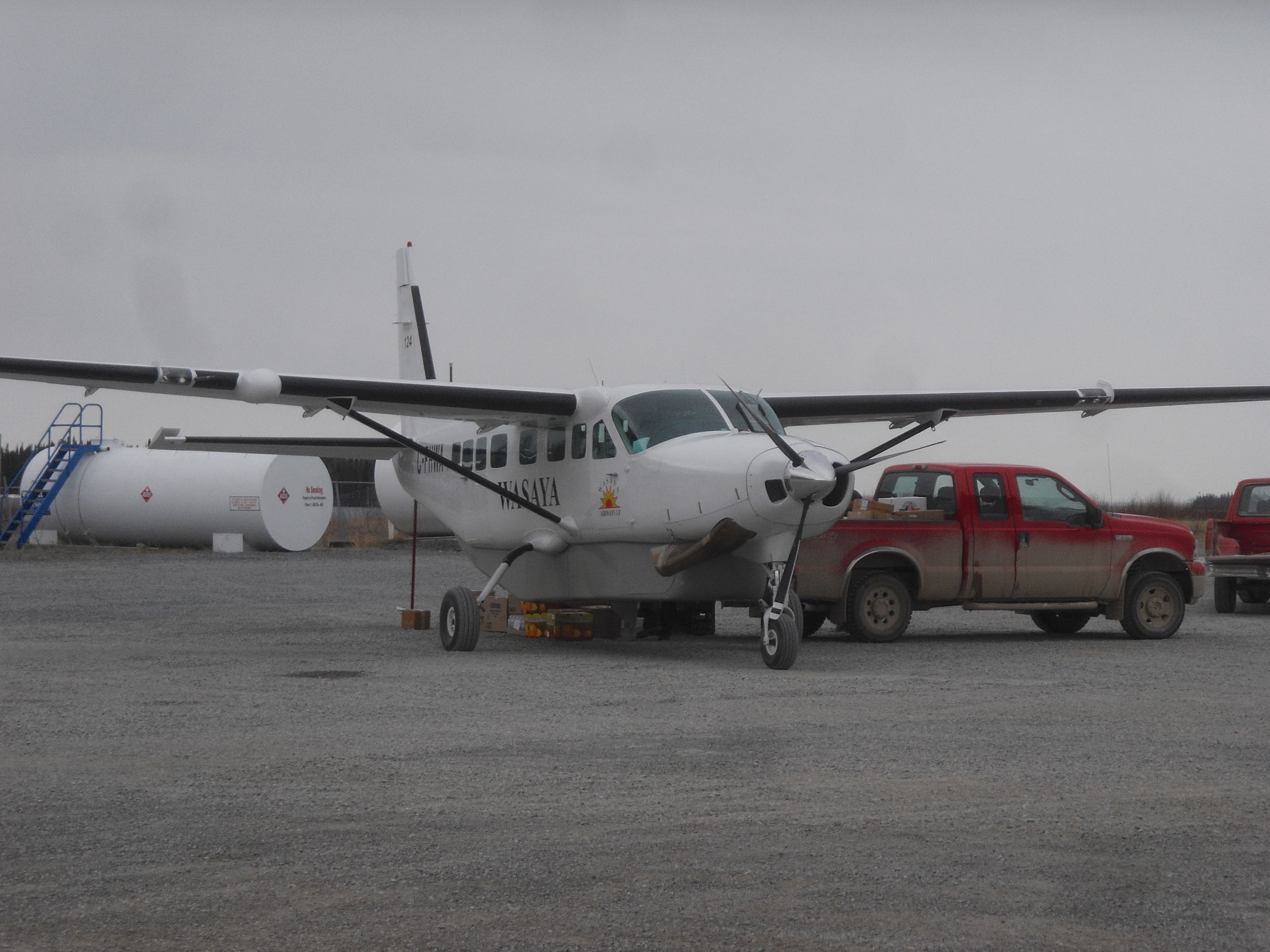
Wasaya Airways Plane at KI airport

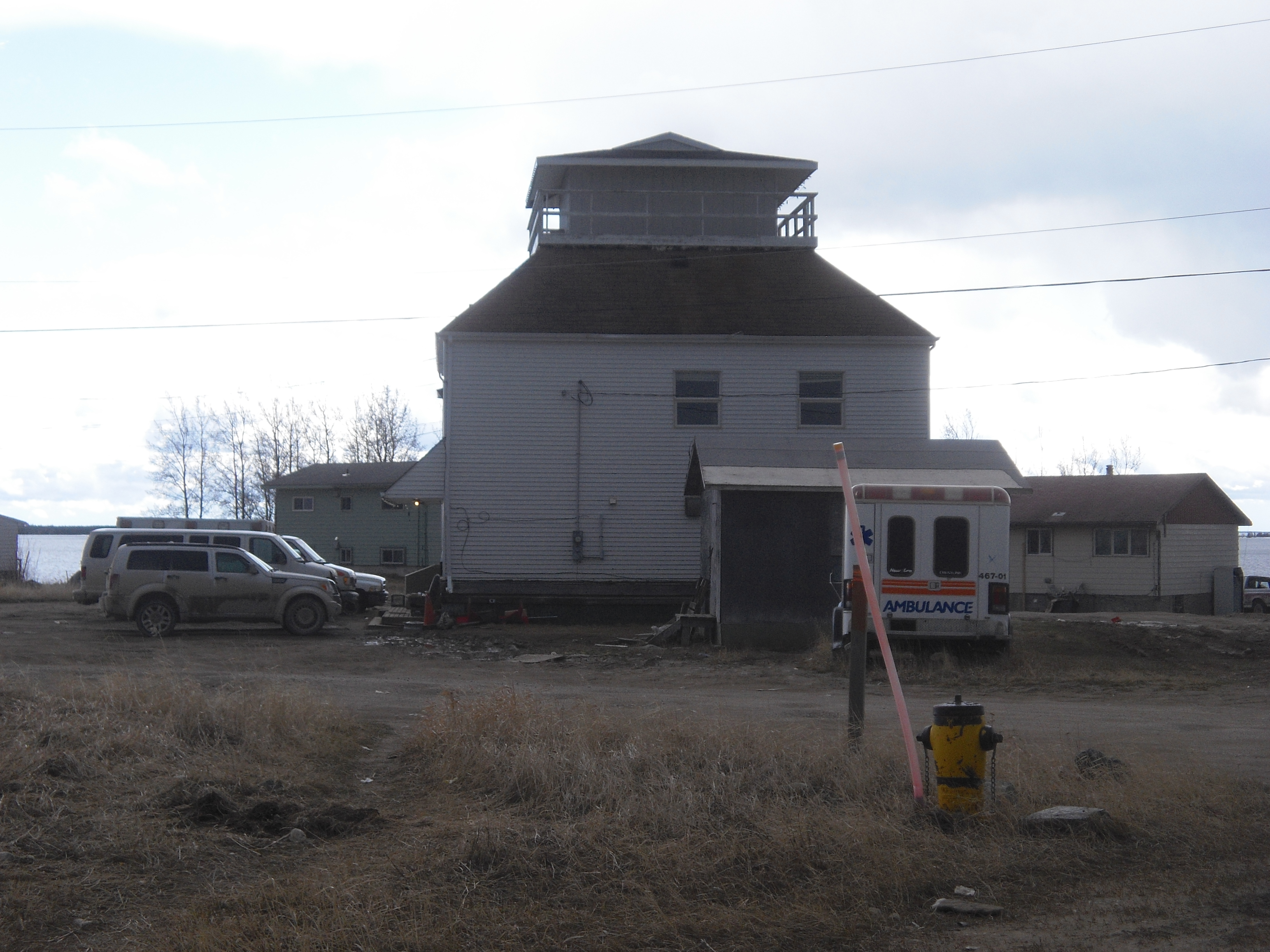
KI Health Office (old Weather Station)

There are water pumping stations providing underground running water to homes on the island while those living on the mainland are serviced by water tanker trucks. There is also underground sewage piping with two lagoons at the west end of the island. The school, teacherages, and Post Island houses are the only structures supplied by underground sewage, the remainder of the community is serviced by a sewage truck.

The community is a fly-in reservation with regularly scheduled flights by Wasaya Airways. The Big Trout Lake Airport has a gravel airstrip that is 1,191 metres (3,907 ft) in length. During the winter months, the community is accessible by winter road to Pickle Lake which is serviced by Ontario Highway 599, the northernmost highway in the province.

Healthcare was traditionally provided by the Hudson's Bay Company post master who would dispense medication etc. The first nursing station was constructed in 1938, funded entirely by Reverend Leslie Garrett. The two-storey building was 36 x 12; it included the electric light powered by a wind-turbine and battery storage. Department of Indian Affairs built a new nursing station in 1950 which was staffed by two nurses. The current nursing station was constructed in 1973. Like other reserves, the healthcare is delivered by the federal Health Canada (unlike the rest of the province). It's a six-nurse station with a physician on site Monday to Friday. The station also has visiting specialists including optometrists and dentists. The nursing station also plays host to two first year medical students every May from the Northern Ontario School of Medicine which is a key component of their first year curriculum.

== History ==
Radio-carbon dating of a human burial site nearby suggests that the region has been occupied for at least 7,000 years. The people of the region are called Inninuwug. The first Europeans gave various names to people of the region including Kiristinon or Kritinou which was eventually shortened to Cree. This reservation is located at the major head-water lake of the Fawn River and subsequently the Severn River to Hudson Bay. Consequently, it has been a traditional gathering place for centuries.

The first recorded European trader was James Swain who, in 1807, was charged with establishing a trading post at "Trout Lake" for the Hudson's Bay Company (HBC). Upon entering the area he noticed the ruins of a settlement left by the rival North West Company who possibly settled as early as 1793; though it was left apparently disused.

The community is predominantly Christian (Anglican and Pentecostal). The exposure to Christianity occurred as early as the late 1700s, brought by early fur traders. The first recorded missionary was W.W. Kirkby and his wife who, in 1872, formally brought the Anglican faith to the community. He discovered that many community members were already Christian reading from biblical texts written in Canadian Aboriginal syllabics (in some cases on birch bark texts). These texts were provided by the people living in Fort York, Churchill, Manitoba. One of the islands off the shore of Big Trout Lake roughly translates to "Catholic's dwelling island".

Built in 1830, the HBC post played an important role locally as it facilitated the trade of furs for goods (fur trade). Everything was traded according to the beaver pelt (Made Beaver – MB). For example, a blanket would cost 6 MB. Local people were then hired to ship the furs down the Fawn River to the Severn then up the Hudson Bay coast to Fort York (present day Churchill, Manitoba). The voyages took five days downstream and fifteen days up.

In 1940, a weather station was constructed and included hourly observations which were transmitted to the department of transport. In 1952 the station was enlarged and had a staff of six people. The building is now used as the Health Administration office.

The first regular communications with the outside world occurred with the "radio sked" which were regular communications between the weather station and the Winnipeg Airport via Morse Code. Northern Telecom supplied phone service in 1963 (by HF radio) which was upgraded in 1975 to satellite service.

=== Conflict with Platinex ===
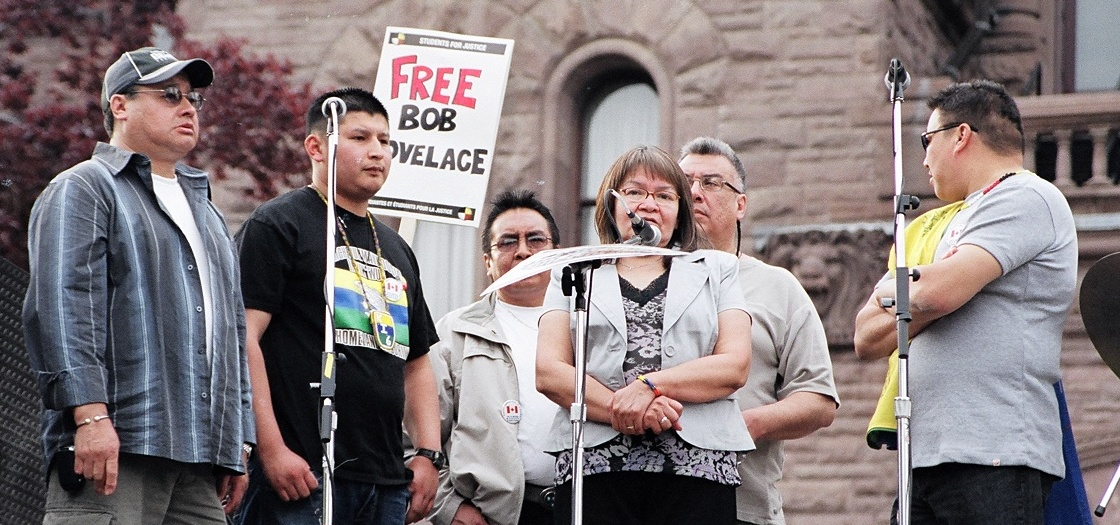
The "KI6" – leaders imprisoned for their protests over mining on traditional Kitchenuhmaykoosib Inninuwug land

The KSI was sued by Platinex Incorporated over an interim order preventing it from exploring. The decision was released May 22, 2007. The court issued three orders: a consultation protocol, a timetable and an MOU on the KI, Platinex and Ontario. The Ontario Superior Court held that appropriate consultation funding was necessary and that it would continue to supervise and facilitate the consultation process. The KI's position had been that "the serious imbalance between the fiscal position(s) of the parties renders the consultation process unfair." No specific finding on funding levels was made, but adequacy of funding was found to be assessable in the consultation process. Implications for other consultation processes remain uncertain.

In 2008, six leaders of the community (Chief Donny Morris, Jack McKay, Sam McKay, Darryl Sainnawap, Cecilia Begg and Bruce Sakakeep) were imprisoned for peacefully protesting development on their traditional land by Platinex. A sacred fire consecrated in front of the Thunder Bay jail which held them was extinguished by police on March 19, 2008. Some members spoke out about this alleged violation of the Canadian Charter of Rights and Freedoms and suppression of traditional ceremony. Several members of KI and surrounding nations protested their leaders' imprisonment by walking all the way from Kenora, Ontario to Toronto, Ontario. The leaders were given temporary parole to appear at the protest at Queen's Park on May 26, and were permanently freed by the Ontario Court of Appeal two days later.

In 2012, Chief Donny Morris and his wife were invited to New Zealand for a speaking tour discussing their experience with Platinex and the Government of Ontario.

== Climate ==
Climate data for Big Trout Lake (1991–2020 normals, extremes 1939–2020)
Month	Jan	Feb	Mar	Apr	May	Jun	Jul	Aug	Sep	Oct	Nov	Dec	Year
Record high humidex	2.4	6.9	14.3	23.4	32.5	44.4	44.0	39.9	34.1	26.4	15.7	4.5	44.4
Record high °C (°F)	2.1 (35.8)	7.7 (45.9)	16.0 (60.8)	24.4 (75.9)	32.4 (90.3)	36.5 (97.7)	35.6 (96.1)	32.9 (91.2)	30.6 (87.1)	24.8 (76.6)	16.2 (61.2)	4.7 (40.5)	36.5 (97.7)
Mean daily maximum °C (°F)	−16.6 (2.1)	−13.4 (7.9)	−5.1 (22.8)	3.8 (38.8)	12.0 (53.6)	19.4 (66.9)	22.4 (72.3)	20.6 (69.1)	14.3 (57.7)	5.5 (41.9)	−4.6 (23.7)	−13.5 (7.7)	3.8 (38.8)
Daily mean °C (°F)	−21.8 (−7.2)	−19.9 (−3.8)	−12.4 (9.7)	−3.0 (26.6)	5.5 (41.9)	13.0 (55.4)	16.4 (61.5)	15.0 (59.0)	9.6 (49.3)	2.2 (36.0)	−8.2 (17.2)	−17.9 (−0.2)	−1.8 (28.8)
Mean daily minimum °C (°F)	−27.1 (−16.8)	−26.4 (−15.5)	−19.7 (−3.5)	−9.8 (14.4)	−0.9 (30.4)	6.5 (43.7)	10.2 (50.4)	9.5 (49.1)	4.9 (40.8)	−1.3 (29.7)	−11.7 (10.9)	−22.3 (−8.1)	−7.3 (18.9)
Record low °C (°F)	−47.8 (−54.0)	−46.7 (−52.1)	−43.1 (−45.6)	−32.8 (−27.0)	−20.6 (−5.1)	−7.2 (19.0)	−1.1 (30.0)	−1.3 (29.7)	−7.8 (18.0)	−20 (−4)	−36 (−33)	−45.2 (−49.4)	−47.8 (−54.0)
Record low wind chill	−60.3	−59.0	−50.6	−40.3	−30.4	−11.2	−6.0	−5.5	−17.7	−25.0	−47.0	−55.8	−60.3
Average precipitation mm (inches)	23.0 (0.91)	20.6 (0.81)	27.9 (1.10)	32.2 (1.27)	37.8 (1.49)	74.3 (2.93)	90.9 (3.58)	87.8 (3.46)	83.0 (3.27)	52.7 (2.07)	50.1 (1.97)	28.8 (1.13)	609.1 (23.98)
Average rainfall mm (inches)	0 (0)	0 (0)	2.2 (0.09)	12.0 (0.47)	27.8 (1.09)	70.8 (2.79)	90.9 (3.58)	87.8 (3.46)	73.8 (2.91)	27.6 (1.09)	4.6 (0.18)	1.0 (0.04)	398.5 (15.69)
Average snowfall cm (inches)	26.0 (10.2)	22.6 (8.9)	28.2 (11.1)	21.3 (8.4)	10.4 (4.1)	3.4 (1.3)	0 (0)	0 (0)	9.3 (3.7)	25.9 (10.2)	48.4 (19.1)	31.7 (12.5)	227.2 (89.4)
Average precipitation days (≥ 0.2 mm)	13.8	12.1	11.2	9.1	10.4	14.1	15.2	14.6	16.1	14.9	17.4	16.4	165.3
Average rainy days (≥ 0.2 mm)	0.10	0.14	0.73	3.3	8.3	13.7	15.1	14.6	15.1	8.4	2.1	0.48	82.0
Average snowy days (≥ 0.2 cm)	14.0	12.1	10.9	6.9	4.0	1.2	0.05	0	2.7	9.3	17.0	16.4	94.4
Average relative humidity (%) (at 15:00 LST)	72.0	62.3	55.3	48.8	51.3	55.2	57.7	61.8	66.2	73.4	79.9	78.6	63.6
Source: Environment and Climate Change Canada
