= Kasabonika Lake First Nation =

Kasabonika Lake ᑳᐦᓴᐹᓇᐦᑳ ᓵᑲᐦᐃᑲᐣ
- Indian reserve
- Kasabonika Lake Indian Reserve
- Location within Ontario Location within Canada
- Coordinates: 53°35′N 88°39′W
- Country: Canada
- Province: Ontario
- District: Kenora
- First Nations: Kasabonika

Area
  - Land: 104.71 km^{2} (40.43 sq mi)

Population (2006)
  - Total: 681
  - Density: 6.5/km^{2} (17/sq mi)
- Website: kasabonika.ca

Kasabonika Lake First Nation (Oji-Cree: ᑳᐦᓴᐹᓇᐦᑳ ᓵᑲᐦᐃᑲᐣ; unpointed: ᑲᓴᐸᓇᑲ ᓴᑲᐦᐃᑲᐣ) or Kasabonika First Nation (Oji-Cree: ᑳᐦᓴᐹᓇᐦᑳ ᓂᐣᑕᒻ ᐊᓂᐦᕈᓂᓂᐧᐗᐠ (Gaasabaanakaa Nistam Anishininiwag); unpointed: ᓂᐣᑕᒻ ᐊᓂᕈᓂᓂᐊᐟ) is an Anisininew First Nations band government located north of Sioux Lookout, Ontario. There are no roads into the community and the only access is through Kasabonika Airport. It is part of the Shibogama First Nations Council and the Nishnawbe Aski Nation. The First Nation's landbase is the 10,806.5-hectare (26,703.4-acre) Kasabonika Lake Reserve.

In September, 2007, the total registered population was 914, of which the on-reserve population was 866.

The residents of Kasabonika were professional, and expert, tree planters for the Ontario Ministry of Natural Resources for many years in the 1960s and 1970s. They worked for several districts, Hearst, Geraldton, and Thunder Bay. Some planters were able to plant as many as 3,000 trees per day.

The Kasabonika First Nation detachment of the Nishnawbe-Aski Police Service was closed in early February 2008 as it lacked running water and relied on a wood fire in a 170 L (37 imp gal; 45 US gal) drum to heat the facility. Holding cells lacked toilet facilities, requiring detainees to use a slop bucket. Prisoners now must be flown to Sioux Lookout, costing as much as $10,000 per trip.

== Governance ==
As of December 2021, the chief of Kasabonika is Gordon Anderson, with Eno H. Anderson as the Deputy Chief. The First Nation's council consists of Head Councillor Nellie Semple and Councillors Josie Anderson Sr, Gordon Morris, Danny Wabasse and Ralph Begg.

== Departments ==
- Administration
- Health
- Tikinagan Workers
- Education
- Economic Development
- Operations & Maintenance
- Ontario Works Welfare

== Contact information ==
General Delivery
Kasabonika Lake, Ontario P0V 1Y0
