= Slate Falls First Nation =

Slate Falls
- Indian settlement
- Slate Falls Indian Settlement
- Location within Ontario
- Coordinates: 51°10′N 91°35′W
- Country: Canada
- Province: Ontario
- District: Kenora
- First Nation: Slate Falls

Government
  - Chief: Lorraine Crane

Area
  - Land: 8.75 km^{2} (3.38 sq mi)

Population (2021)
  - Total: 299
  - Density: 34.2/km^{2} (88.5/sq mi)

Slate Falls Nation (Ojibwe: Shakopaatikoong) is an Ojibwe First Nation band government in Ontario. It has a settlement at Slate Falls in Kenora District, Ontario. As of 2016, the First Nation had a registered population of 241 people, of which the on-reserve population was 9.
