= North Caribou Lake First Nation =

Weagamow Lake 87
- Indian reserve
- Weagamow Lake Indian Reserve No. 87
- Location within Ontario Location within Canada
- Coordinates: 52°58′N 91°16′W
- Country: Canada
- Province: Ontario
- District: Kenora
- First Nations: North Caribou Lake

Area
  - Land: 95.75 km^{2} (36.97 sq mi)

Population (2006)
  - Total: 700
  - Density: 7.3/km^{2} (19/sq mi)

North Caribou Lake First Nation or Weagamow First Nation (Severn Ojibwa: ᐗᐎᔦᑲᒪᐠ), sometimes also known as Round Lake First Nation, is an Anisininew First Nations band government who inhabit the Kenora District in northern Ontario, Canada. It is approximately 320 km (200 mi) by air north of Sioux Lookout. As of January 2008, the First Nations had a registered population of 928 people, of which their on-reserve population was 677.

== Name ==
Though the First Nation's official name registered with the Indian and Northern Affairs Canada is "North Caribou Lake First Nation," the Nation is located on Weagamow Lake, thus also known as "Weagamow First Nation" or by the literal translation of the Oji-Cree word Wiyaagamaa—"Round Lake."

== Governance ==
The First Nation elect their officials through a Custom Electoral System, consisting of a Chief and seven councillors. The current Chief is Cornelius Benson. Head Band Councillor is Ernest Quequish. Elder Band Councillor is Silas Jeremiah. Youth Advocate Band Councillor is Carlena Petawanick. The other Band Councillors are Paul Johnup, Raymond Adams, Grace Matawapit, & Leo Sakchekapo.[2020]

As a signatory to the 1929 Adhesion to Treaty No. 9, North Caribou Lake First Nation is a member of the Windigo First Nations Council, a Regional Chiefs Council, and Nishnawbe Aski Nation, a Tribal Political Organization that represents majority of First Nation governments in Northern Ontario. Signatories for the Nation, July 18, 1930, were Apin Kakapeness, Jonas Wasakimik, Samuel Sawanis, John Quequeish, Patrick Kakekayash, and Sena Sakchekapo, all of whom signed in Syllabic.

== Reserve ==
The First Nation have reserved for themselves the 9172.3 ha Weagamow Lake Indian Reserve 87. The community of Weagamow Lake, Ontario, is located on this Indian reserve.
