= Geography of Canada =

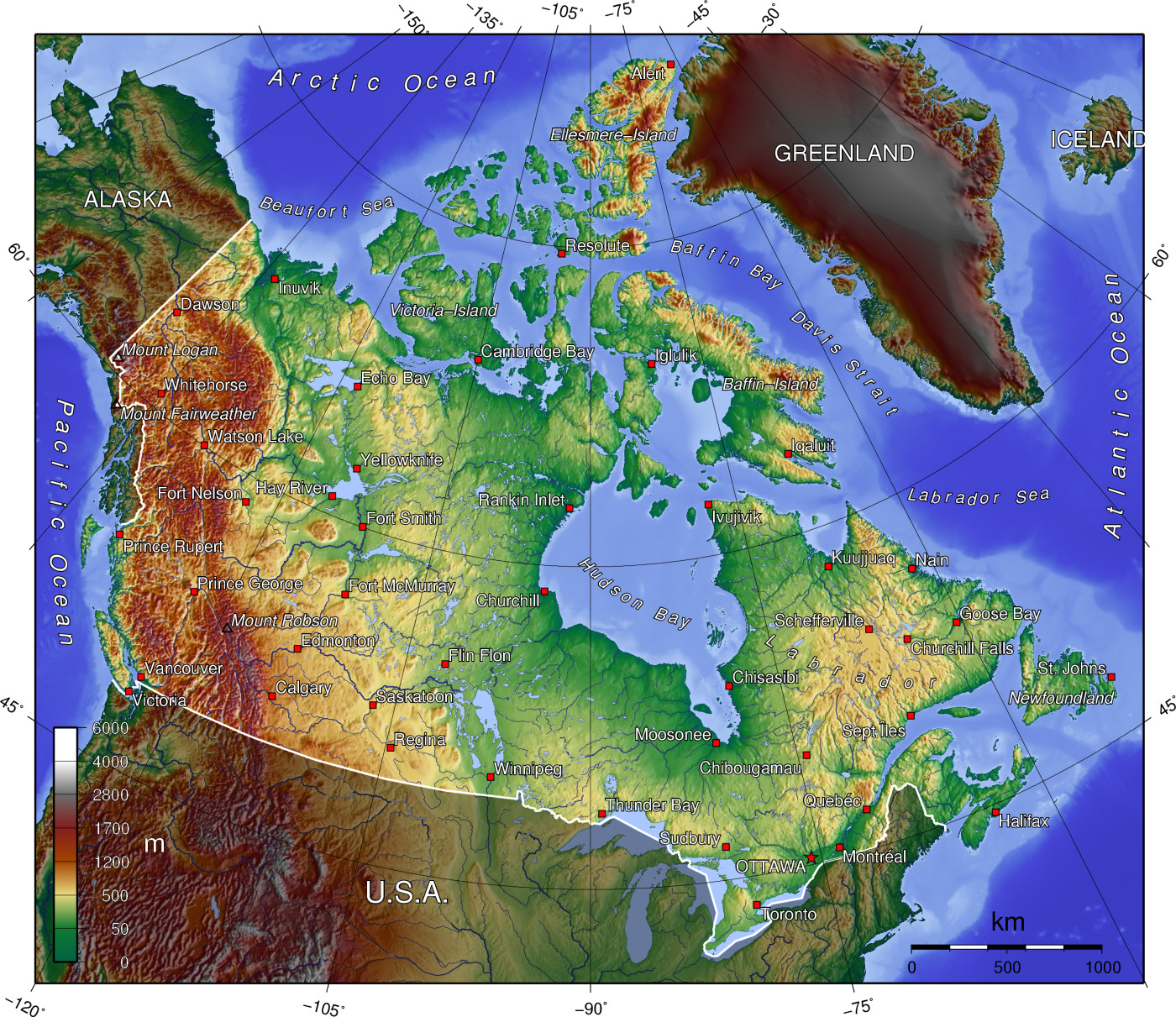
- Continent: North America
- Region: Northern America
- Coordinates: 60°00′N 95°00′W
- Area: Ranked 2nd
  - Total: 9,984,671 km^{2} (3,855,103 sq mi)
  - Land: 91.08%
  - Water: 8.92%
- Coastline: 243,042 km (151,019 mi)
- Borders: 8,893 km
- Highest point: Mount Logan, 5,959 m (19,551 ft)
- Lowest point: Atlantic Ocean, Sea Level
- Longest river: Mackenzie River, 4,241 km (2,635 mi)
- Largest lake: Great Bear Lake; 31,153 km^{2} (12,028 sq mi)
- Climate: temperate, or humid continental to subarctic or arctic in north, and tundra in mountainous areas, and the far north
- Terrain: mostly plains and mountains in west, to highlands (low mountains) in the south east, and east, to flatlands in the Great Lakes
- Natural resources: iron ore, nickel, zinc, copper, gold, lead, molybdenum, potash, diamonds, silver, fish, timber, wildlife, coal, petroleum, natural gas, hydropower
- Natural hazards: permafrost, cyclonic storms, tornadoes, earthquakes, forest fires
- Environmental issues: air and water pollution, acid rains
- Exclusive economic zone: 5,599,077 km^{2} (2,161,816 mi^{2})

Canada has a vast geography that occupies much of the continent of North America, sharing a land border with the contiguous United States to the south and the U.S. state of Alaska to the northwest. Canada stretches from the Atlantic Ocean in the east to the Pacific Ocean in the west; to the north lies the Arctic Ocean. Greenland is to the northeast, with a shared border on Tartupaluk/Hans Island. To the southeast Canada shares a maritime boundary with France's overseas collectivity of Saint Pierre and Miquelon, the last vestige of New France. By total area (including its waters), Canada is the second-largest country in the world, after Russia. By land area alone, however, Canada ranks fourth, the difference being due to it having the world's largest proportion of freshwater lakes. Of Canada's 13 provinces and territories, only two are landlocked (Alberta and Saskatchewan), while the other 11 all directly border one of three oceans.

Canada is home to the world's northernmost settlement, Canadian Forces Station Alert, on the northern tip of Ellesmere Island—latitude 82.5°N—which lies 817 kilometres (508 mi) from the North Pole. Much of the Canadian Arctic is covered by ice and permafrost. Canada has the longest coastline in the world, with a total length of 243,042 kilometres (151,019 mi); additionally, its border with the United States is the world's longest land border, stretching 8,891 kilometres (5,525 mi). Three of Canada's Arctic islands, Baffin Island, Victoria Island, and Ellesmere Island, are among the 10 largest in the world.

Canada can be divided into seven physiographic regions: the Canadian Shield, the Interior Plains, the Great Lakes–St. Lawrence Lowlands, the Appalachian region, the Western Cordillera, Hudson Bay Lowlands, and the Arctic Archipelago. Canada is also divided into 15 terrestrial and five marine ecozones, encompassing over 80,000 classified species of life. Since the end of the last glacial period, Canada has consisted of eight distinct forest regions, including extensive boreal forest on the Canadian Shield; 42 percent of the land acreage of Canada is covered by forests (approximately 8 percent of the world's forested land), made up mostly of spruce, poplar, and pine. Canada has over 2,000,000 lakes—563 greater than 100 km^{2} (39 sq mi)—which is more than any other country, containing much of the world's fresh water. There are also freshwater glaciers in the Canadian Rockies, the Coast Mountains, and the Arctic Cordillera. A recent global remote sensing analysis also suggested that there were 6,477 km^{2} of tidal flats in Canada, making it the 5th ranked country in terms of how much tidal flat occurs there. Protected areas of Canada and National Wildlife Areas have been established to preserve ecosystems.

Canada is geologically active, experiencing many earthquakes and potentially active volcanoes, notably the Mount Meager massif, Mount Garibaldi, Mount Cayley, and the Mount Edziza volcanic complex. Average winter and summer high temperatures across Canada range from Arctic weather in the north to hot summers in the southern regions, with four distinct seasons.

== Physiography ==
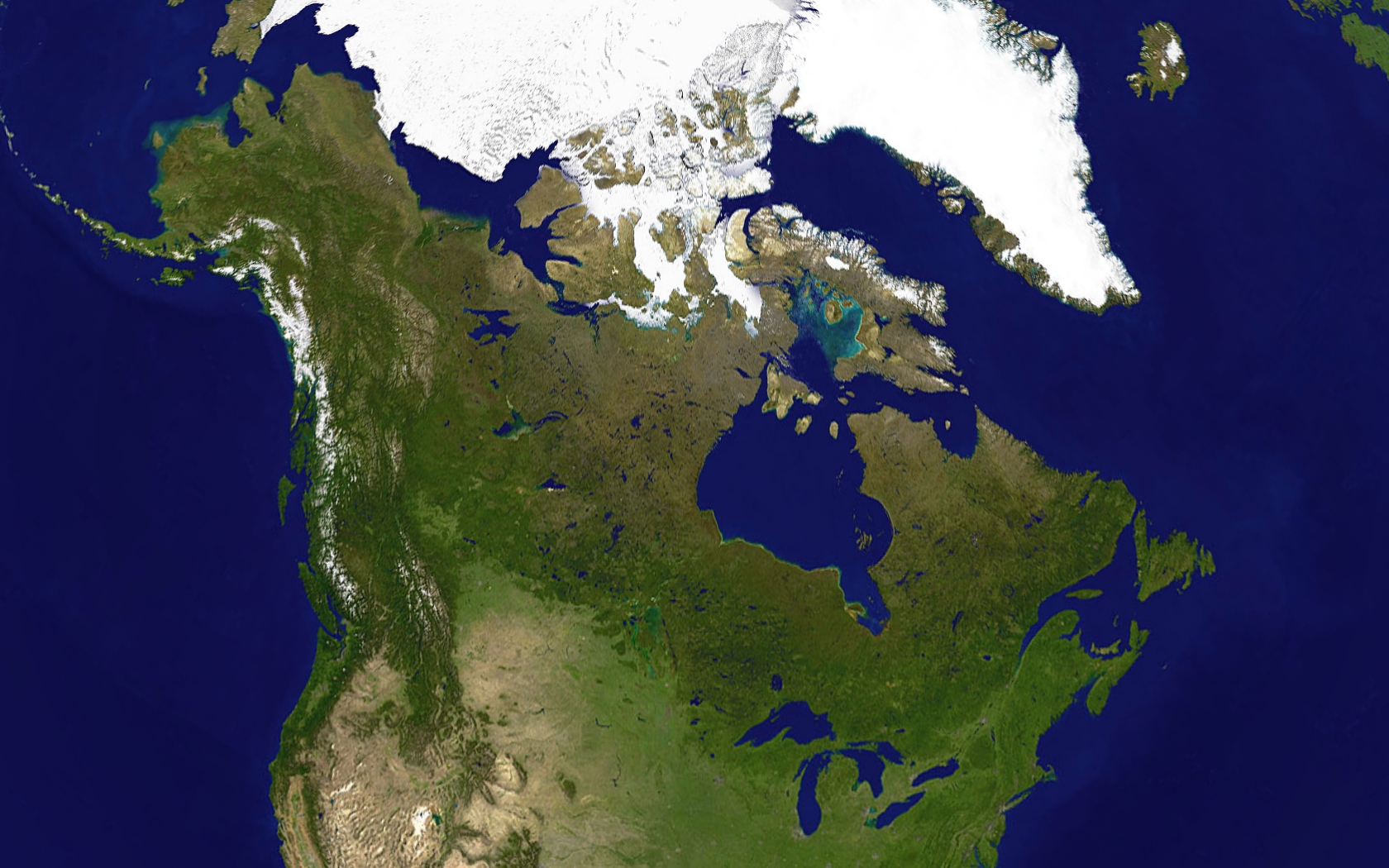
Canada can be divided into seven physiographic regions: the Canadian Shield, the Interior Plains, the Great Lakes–St. Lawrence Lowlands, the Appalachian region, the Western Cordillera, Hudson Bay Lowlands, and the Arctic Archipelago.

also encompasses vast maritime terrain, with the world's longest coastline of 243,042 kilometres (151,019 mi). The physical geography of Canada is widely varied. Boreal forests prevail throughout the country, ice is prominent in northerly Arctic regions and through the Canadian Rocky Mountains, and the relatively flat Canadian Prairies in the southwest facilitate productive agriculture. The Great Lakes feed the St. Lawrence River (in the southeast), where lowlands host much of Canada's population.

The National Topographic System is used by Natural Resources Canada to provide general–purpose topographic maps of the country. The maps provide detail on landforms and terrain, lakes and rivers, forested areas, administrative zones, populated areas, roads and railways, as well as other man-made features. These maps are used by all levels of government and industry for forest fire and flood control (as well as other environmental issues), depiction of crop areas, right-of-way, real estate planning, development of natural resources, and highway planning.

=== Appalachian Mountains ===
The Appalachian mountain range extends from Alabama in the southern United States through the Gaspé Peninsula and the Atlantic Provinces, creating rolling hills indented by river valleys. It also runs through parts of southern Quebec.

The Appalachian Mountains (more specifically, the Chic-Choc, Notre Dame, and Long Range Mountains) are an old and eroded range of mountains, approximately 380 million years old. Notable mountains in the Appalachians include Mount Jacques-Cartier (Quebec, 1,268 m or 4,160 ft), Mount Carleton (New Brunswick, 817 m or 2,680 ft), and The Cabox (Newfoundland, 814 m or 2,671 ft). Parts of the Appalachians are home to a rich endemic flora and fauna and are considered to have been nunataks during the last glaciation era.

=== Great Lakes and St. Lawrence Lowlands ===
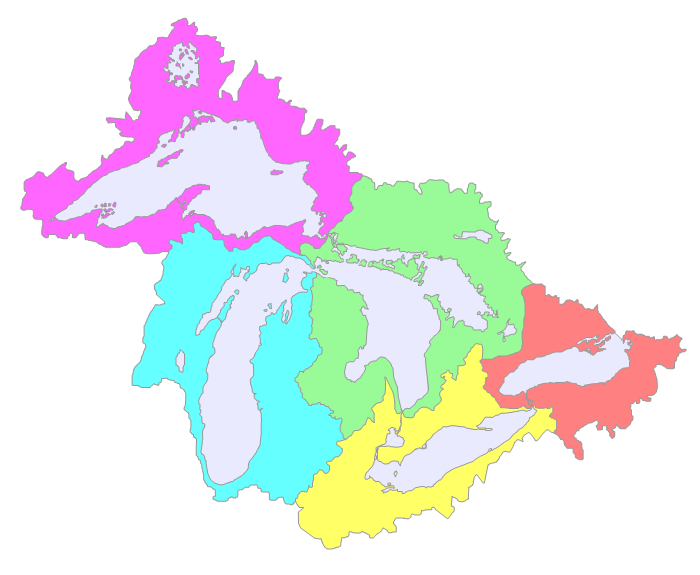
A map of the Great Lakes Basin showing the five sub-basins within. Left to right they are: Superior, including Nipigon's basin, (magenta); Michigan (cyan); Huron (pale green); Erie (yellow); Ontario (light coral).

The Great Lakes–St. Lawrence Lowlands, or simply St. Lawrence Lowlands, is a physiographic region of Eastern Canada that comprises a section of southern Ontario bounded on the north by the Canadian Shield and by three of the Great Lakes — Lake Huron, Lake Erie and Lake Ontario — and extends along the St. Lawrence River to the Strait of Belle Isle and the Atlantic Ocean. The lowlands comprise three sub-regions that were created by intrusions from adjacent physiographic regions — the West Lowland, Central Lowland and East Lowland. The West Lowland includes the Niagara Escarpment, extending from the Niagara River to the Bruce Peninsula and Manitoulin Island. The Central Lowland stretches between the Ottawa River and the St. Lawrence River. The East Lowland includes Anticosti Island, Îles de Mingan, and extends to the Strait of Belle Isle.

The St. Lawrence Lowlands is one of the most densely populated, prosperous and productive regions in Canada. Major urban areas include Toronto, Montreal, Ottawa-Gatineau and Quebec City.

The St. Lawrence Lowlands was covered by surficial deposits left by ice sheets following the Pleistocene glaciations. It is the smallest of Canada's seven physiographic regions — the others being the Arctic Lands, the Cordillera, the Interior Plains, the Canadian Shield, the Hudson Bay Lowlands and the Appalachian Uplands — distinguished by topography and geology. The boundaries of the area largely reflect that of the Mixedwood Plains Ecozone, the smallest of Canada's fifteen terrestrial ecozones.

=== Canadian Shield ===
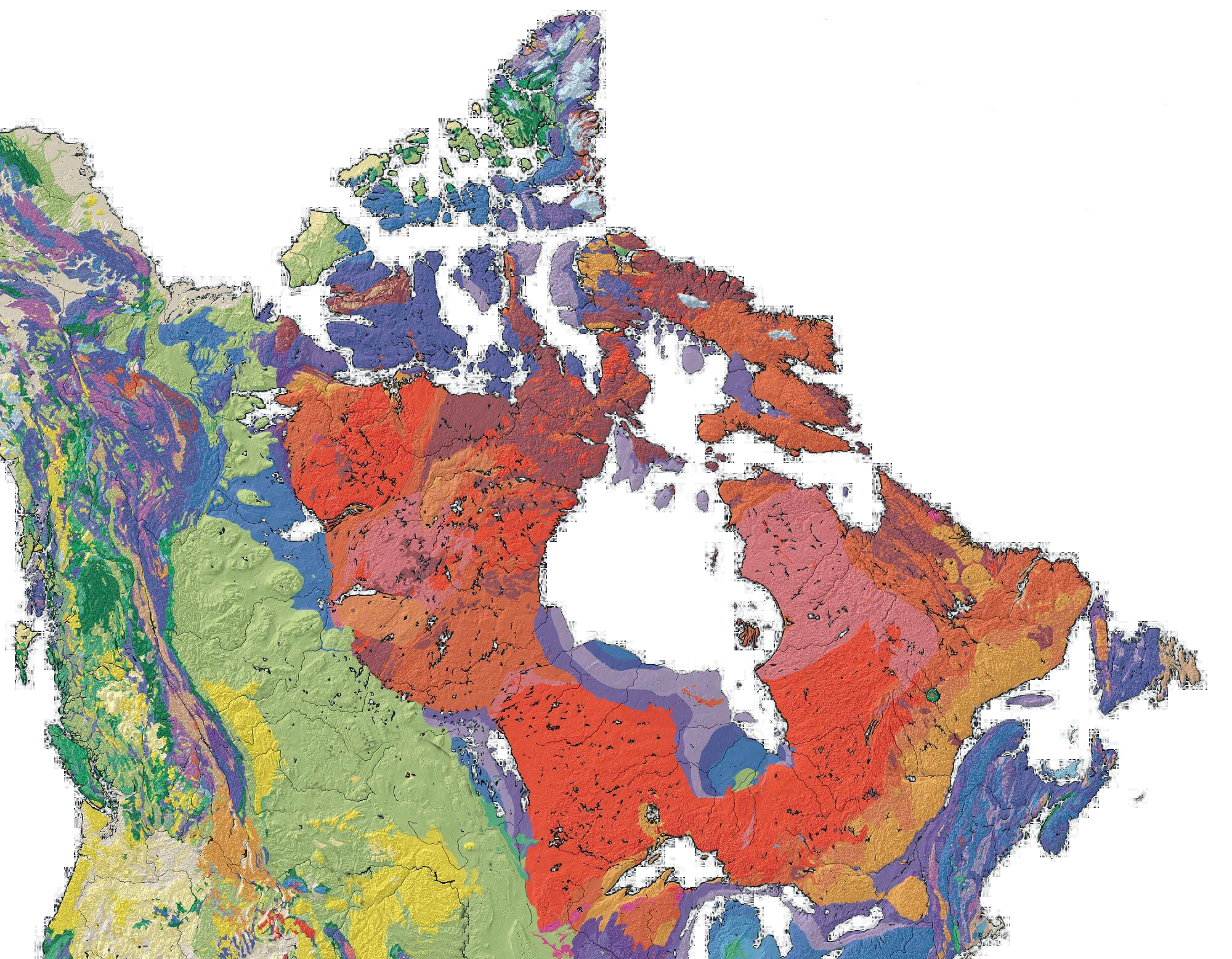
The Canadian Shield is a broad region of Precambrian rock (pictured in shades of red)

The northeastern part of Alberta, the northern parts of Saskatchewan, Manitoba, Ontario, and Quebec, all of Labrador, and the Great Northern Peninsula of Newfoundland, eastern mainland Northwest Territories, most of Nunavut's mainland, and its Arctic Archipelago, Baffin Island and significant bands through Somerset, Southampton, Devon and Ellesmere Islands are located on a vast rock base known as the Canadian Shield. The Shield mostly consists of eroded hilly terrain and contains many lakes and important rivers used for hydroelectric production, particularly in northern Quebec and Ontario. The Shield also encloses an area of wetlands around Hudson Bay. Some particular regions of the Shield are referred to as mountain ranges, including the Torngat and Laurentian Mountains.

The shield cannot support intensive agriculture, although there is subsistence agriculture and small dairy farms in many of the river valleys and around the abundant lakes, particularly in the southern regions. Boreal forest covers much of the shield, with a mix of conifers that provide valuable timber resources in areas such as the Central Canadian Shield forests ecoregion that covers much of Northern Ontario.

The Canadian Shield is known for its vast mineral reserves, such as emeralds, diamonds and copper, and is also referred to the "mineral house".

=== Canadian Interior Plains ===
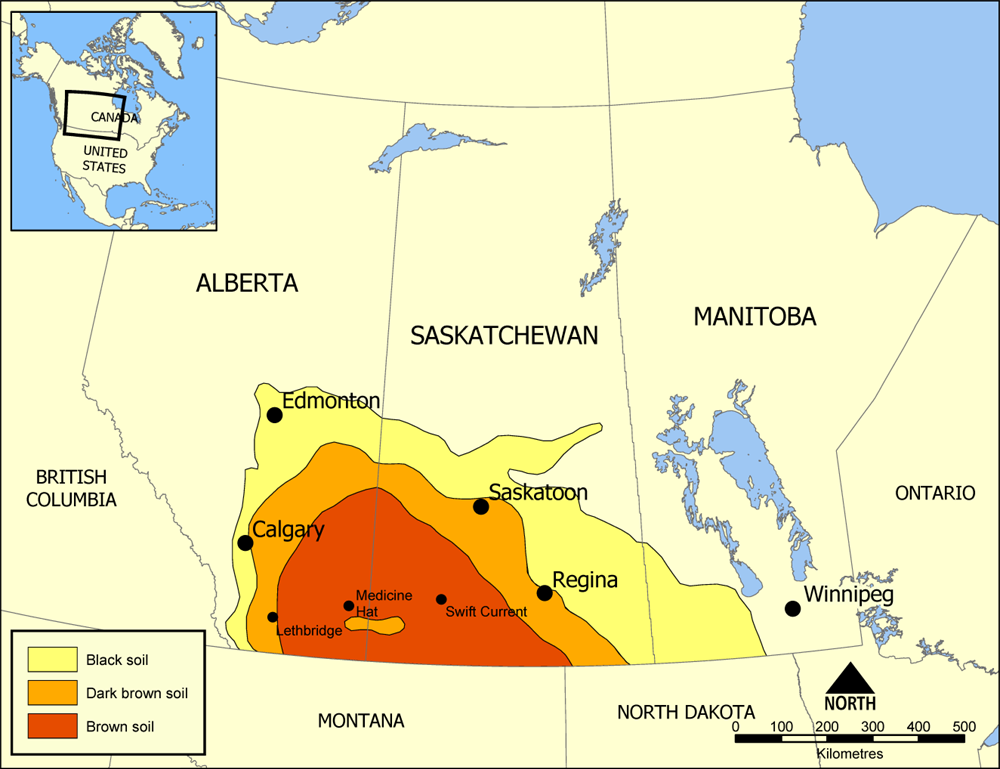
Palliser's Triangle, delineating prairie soil types in the Prairie provinces.

The Canadian Prairies (often referred to as simply the Prairies federally) is a region in Western Canada. It includes the Canadian portion of the Great Plains and the Prairie provinces, Alberta, Saskatchewan, and Manitoba. These provinces are partially covered by grasslands, plains, and lowlands, mostly in the southern regions. The northernmost reaches of the Canadian Prairies are less dense in population, marked by forests and more variable topography. If the region is defined to include areas only covered by prairie land, the corresponding region is known as the Interior Plains. Physical or ecological aspects of the Canadian Prairies extend to northeastern British Columbia, but that area is not included in the political use of the term.

The prairies in Canada are a biome of temperate grassland and shrubland within the prairie ecoregion of Canada. This ecoregion consists of northern mixed grasslands in Alberta, Saskatchewan, and southern Manitoba, as well as northern short grasslands in southeastern Alberta and southwestern Saskatchewan. The Prairies Ecozone of Canada includes the northern tall grasslands in southern Manitoba and Aspen parkland, which covers central Alberta, central Saskatchewan, and southern Manitoba. The Prairie starts from north of Edmonton and it covers the three provinces in a southward-slanting line east to the Manitoba–Minnesota border. Alberta has the most land classified as prairie, while Manitoba has the least, as the boreal forest begins more southerly in Manitoba than in Alberta.

=== Canadian Arctic ===
While the largest part of the Canadian Arctic is composed of seemingly endless permafrost and tundra north of the tree line, it encompasses geological regions of varying types: the Arctic Cordillera (with the British Empire Range and the United States Range on Ellesmere Island) contains the northernmost mountain system in the world. The Arctic Lowlands and Hudson Bay lowlands comprise a substantial part of the geographic region often designated as the Canadian Shield (in contrast to the sole geologic area). The ground in the Arctic is mostly composed of permafrost, making construction difficult and often hazardous, and agriculture virtually impossible.

The Arctic, when defined as everything north of the tree line, covers most of Nunavut and the northernmost parts of Northwest Territories, Yukon, Manitoba, Ontario, Quebec and Labrador. The archipelago consists of 36,563 islands, of which 94 are classified as major islands, being larger than 130 km^{2} (50 sq mi), and cover a total area of 1,400,000 km^{2} (540,000 sq mi).

=== Western Cordillera ===
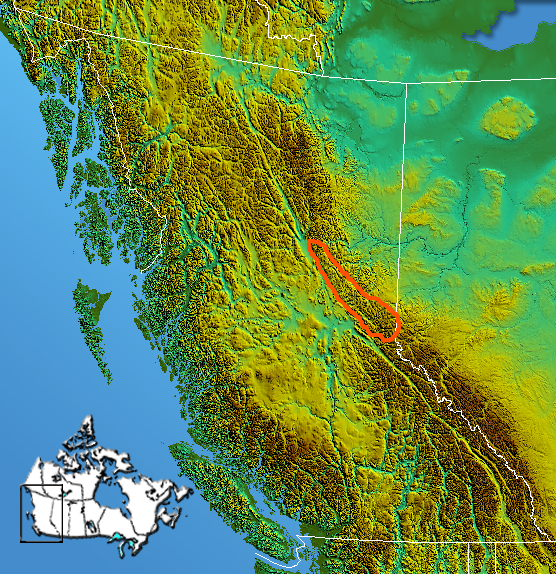
Map of the Hart Ranges in British Columbia

The Coast Mountains in British Columbia run from the lower Fraser River and the Fraser Canyon northwestward, separating the Interior Plateau from the Pacific Ocean. Its southeastern end is separated from the North Cascades by the Fraser Lowland, where nearly a third of Western Canada's population reside.

The coastal flank of the Coast Mountains is characterized by an intense network of fjords and associated islands, very similar to the Norwegian coastline in Northern Europe; while their inland side transitions to the high plateau with dryland valleys notable for a series of large alpine lakes similar to those in southern Switzerland, beginning in deep mountains and ending in flatland. They are subdivided in three main groups, the Pacific Ranges between the Fraser River and Bella Coola, the Kitimat Ranges from there northwards to the Nass River, and the Boundary Ranges from there to the mountain terminus in Yukon at Champagne Pass and Chilkat Pass northwest of Haines, Alaska. The Saint Elias Mountains lie to their west and northwest, while the Yukon Ranges and Yukon Basin lie to their north. On the inland side of the Boundary Ranges are the Tahltan and Tagish Highlands and also the Skeena Mountains, part of the Interior Mountains system, which also extend southwards on the inland side of the Kitimat Ranges.

The terrain of the main spine of the Coast Mountains is typified by heavy glaciation, including several very large icefields of varying elevation. Of the three subdivisions, the Pacific Ranges are the highest and are crowned by Mount Waddington, while the Boundary Ranges contain the largest icefields, the Juneau Icefield being the largest. The Kitimat Ranges are lower and less glacier-covered than either of the other two groupings, but are extremely rugged and dense.

The Coast Mountains are made of igneous and metamorphic rock from an episode of arc volcanism related to subduction of the Kula and Farallon Plates during the Laramide orogeny about 100 million years ago. The widespread granite forming the Coast Mountains formed when magma intruded and cooled at depth beneath volcanoes of the Coast Range Arc whereas the metamorphic formed when intruding magma heated the surrounding rock to produce schist.

The Insular Mountains extend from Vancouver Island in the south to the Haida Gwaii in the north on the British Columbia Coast. It contains two main mountain ranges, the Vancouver Island Ranges on Vancouver Island and the Queen Charlotte Mountains on Haida Gwaii.

=== Hudson Bay Lowlands ===
The Hudson Bay Lowlands approximately coincide with the Southern Hudson Bay taiga ecoregion of North America.

The Hudson Bay Lowlands is a vast wetland located between the Canadian Shield and southern shores of Hudson Bay and James Bay. Most of the area lies within the province of Ontario, with smaller portions reaching into Manitoba and Quebec. Many wide and slow-moving rivers flow through this area toward the saltwater of Hudson Bay: these include the Churchill, Nelson and Hayes in Manitoba, Severn, Fawn, Winisk, Asheweig, Ekwan, Attawapiskat, and Albany in Ontario, and the Harricana, Rupert and Eastmain in Quebec. This is the largest wetland in Canada, and one of the largest in the world. The region can be subdivided into three bands running roughly northwest to southeast: the Coastal Hudson Bay Lowland (a narrow band along the northern coast), Hudson Bay Lowland (a broader band extending to slightly south of the Ekwan River), and James Bay Lowland (all the rest of the southern/eastern lands, making up close to 50% of the total Lowlands area).

The entire area was covered by ice during the last glaciation, and the peatlands have accumulated over the last 10,000 years. Striations of muskeg like "tiger stripes up and down the Earth" represent stages in the receding coastline of the Tyrrell Sea (a term for prehistoric Hudson Bay). Plants from the boreal forest mix with arctic species. A majority of the wetland is peat bog and fen, although salt marshes occur along the coast, and marshes and wet meadows occur along the major rivers. The wetlands provide important habitat for migratory birds including shorebirds (e.g., yellow rail) and waterfowl (e.g., snow geese). Large mammals include polar bears and wolverines.

==== Extreme points ====
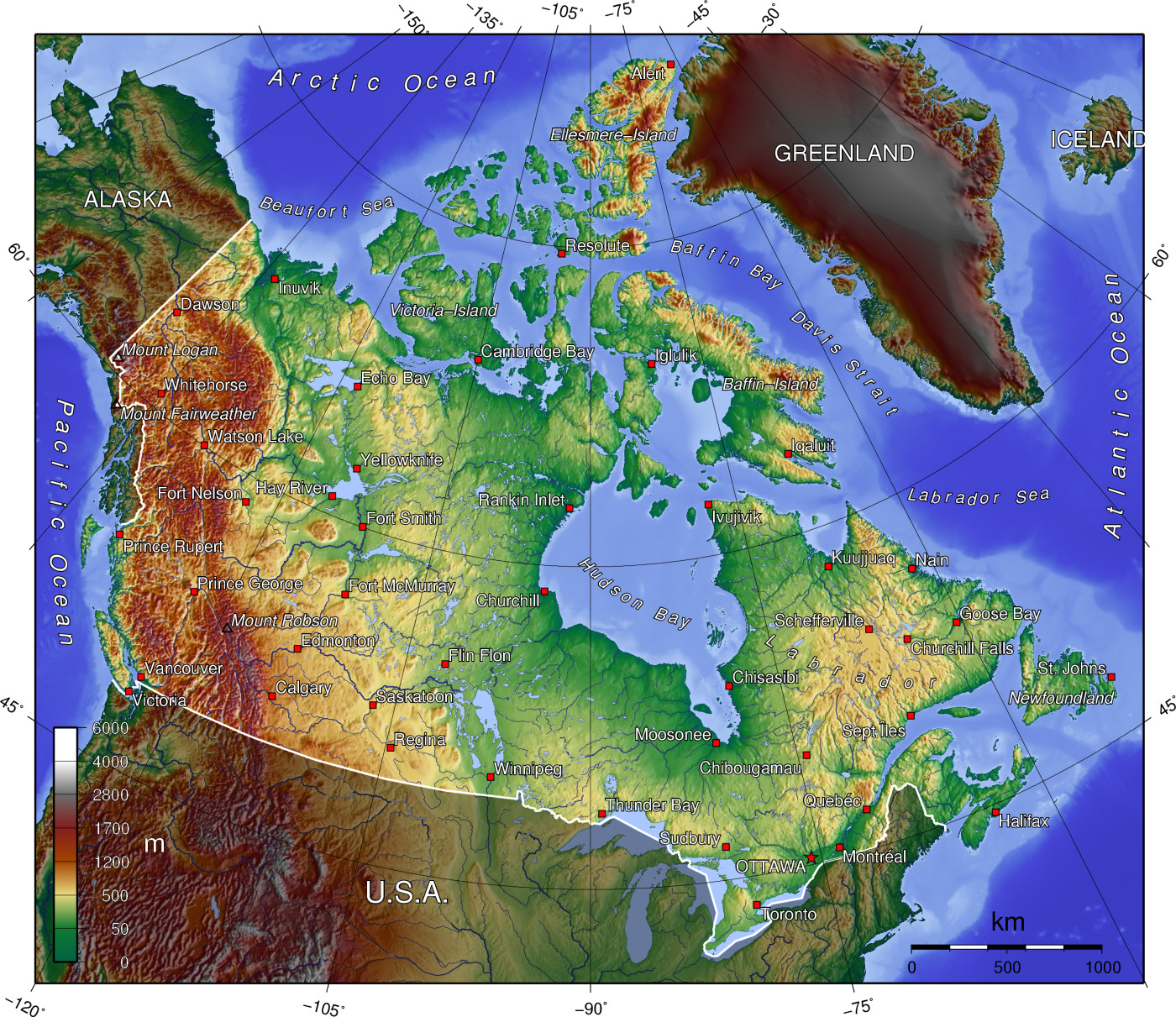
Topographic map

The northernmost point of land within the boundaries of Canada is Cape Columbia, Ellesmere Island, Nunavut 83.111°N 69.972°W. The northernmost point of the Canadian mainland is Zenith Point on Boothia Peninsula, Nunavut 72.002°N 94.655°W. The southernmost point is Middle Island, in Lake Erie, Ontario (41°41′N 82°40′W); the southernmost water point lies just south of the island, on the Ontario–Ohio border (41°40′35″N). The southernmost point of the Canadian mainland is Point Pelee, Ontario 41.909°N 82.509°W. The lowest point is sea level at 0 m, whilst the highest point is Mount Logan, Yukon, at 5,959 m / 19,550 ft 60.567°N 140.405°W.

The westernmost point is Boundary Peak 187 (60°18′22.929″N 141°00′7.128″W) at the southern end of the Yukon–Alaska border, which roughly follows 141°W but leans very slightly east as it goes North 60.301°N 141.010°W. The easternmost point is Cape Spear, Newfoundland (47°31′N 52°37′W) 47.523°N 52.619°W. The easternmost point of the Canadian mainland is Elijah Point, Cape St. Charles, Labrador (52°13′N 55°37′W) 52.217°N 55.621°W.

The Canadian pole of inaccessibility is allegedly near Jackfish River, Alberta (59°2′N 112°49′W). The furthest straight-line distance that can be travelled to Canadian points of land is between the southwest tip of Kluane National Park and Reserve (next to Mount Saint Elias) and Cripple Cove, Newfoundland (near Cape Race) at a distance of 3,005.60 nautical miles (5,566.37 km; 3,458.78 mi).

== Climatology ==
Köppen climate classification types of Canada

Climate varies widely from region to region. Winters can be harsh in many parts of the country, particularly in the interior and Prairie provinces, which experience a continental climate, where daily average temperatures are near −15 °C (5 °F), but can drop below −40 °C (−40 °F) with severe wind chills. In non-coastal regions, snow can cover the ground for almost six months of the year, while in parts of the north snow can persist year-round. Coastal British Columbia has a temperate climate, with a mild and rainy winter. On the east and west coasts, average high temperatures are generally in the low 20s °C (70s °F), while between the coasts, the average summer high temperature ranges from 25 to 30 °C (77 to 86 °F), with temperatures in some interior locations occasionally exceeding 40 °C (104 °F).

Much of Northern Canada is covered by ice and permafrost; however, the future of the permafrost is uncertain because the Arctic has been warming at three times the global average as a result of climate change in Canada. Canada's annual average temperature over land has warmed by 1.7 °C (3.1 °F), with changes ranging from 1.1 to 2.3 °C (2.0 to 4.1 °F) in various regions, since 1948. The rate of warming has been higher across the North and in the Prairies. In the southern regions of Canada, air pollution from both Canada and the United States—caused by metal smelting, burning coal to power utilities, and vehicle emissions—has resulted in acid rain, which has severely impacted waterways, forest growth and agricultural productivity in Canada.

== Biogeography ==
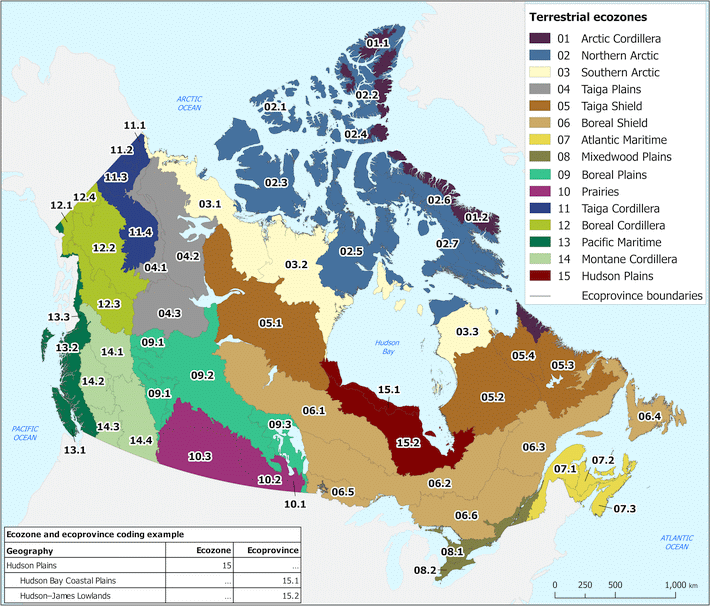
ELC Ecozones and ecoprovinces of Canada

Canada is divided into fifteen major terrestrial and five marine ecozones, that are further subdivided into 53 ecoprovinces, 194 ecoregions, and 1,027 ecodistricts. These eco-areas encompass over 80,000 classified species of Canadian wildlife, with an equal number yet to be formally recognized or discovered. Due to pollution, loss of biodiversity, over-exploitation of commercial species, invasive species, and habitat loss, there are currently more than 800 wild life species at risk of being lost.

Canada's major biomes are the tundra, boreal forest, grassland, and temperate deciduous forest. British Columbia contains several smaller biomes, including; mountain forest which extends to Alberta, and a small temperate rainforest along the Pacific coast, the semi arid desert located in the Okanagan and alpine tundra in the higher mountainous regions.

Over half of Canada's landscape is intact and relatively free of human development. Approximately half of Canada is covered by forest, totalling around 2.4 million km^{2} (0.93 million sq mi). The boreal forest of Canada is considered to be the largest intact forest on Earth, with around 300,000 square kilometres (120,000 sq mi) undisturbed by roads, cities or industry. The Canadian Arctic tundra is the second-largest vegetation region in the country consisting of dwarf shrubs, sedges and grasses, mosses and lichens.

Approximately 12.1 per cent of the nation's landmass and freshwater are conservation areas, including 11.4 per cent designated as protected areas. Approximately 13.8 per cent of its territorial waters are conserved, including 8.9 per cent designated as protected areas.

== Palaeogeography ==
Volcanic activity is a major part of the geology of Canada and is characterized by many types of volcanic landform, including lava flows, volcanic plateaus, lava domes, cinder cones, stratovolcanoes, shield volcanoes, submarine volcanoes, calderas, diatremes, and maars, along with less common volcanic forms such as tuyas and subglacial mounds.

Though Canada's volcanic history dates back to the Precambrian eon, at least 3.11 billion years ago, when its part of the North American continent began to form, volcanism continues to occur in Western and Northern Canada in modern times, where it forms part of an encircling chain of volcanoes and frequent earthquakes around the Pacific Ocean called the Pacific Ring of Fire. Because volcanoes in Western and Northern Canada are in relatively remote and sparsely populated areas and their activity is less frequent than with other volcanoes around the Pacific Ocean, Canada is commonly thought to occupy a gap in the Ring of Fire between the volcanoes of the western United States to the south and the Aleutian volcanoes of Alaska to the north. Even so, the mountainous landscapes of the Canadian provinces of Alberta, British Columbia, Yukon, and the Northwest Territories include more than 100 volcanoes that have been active during the past two million years and whose eruptions have claimed many lives.

Volcanic activity is responsible for many of Canada's geological and geographical features and mineralization, including the nucleus of the North American continent, known as the Canadian Shield. Volcanism has led to the formation of hundreds of volcanic areas and extensive lava formations across Canada. The country's different volcano and lava types originate from different tectonic settings and types of volcanic eruptions, ranging from passive lava eruptions to violent explosive eruptions. Canada has a rich record of very large volumes of magmatic rock called large igneous provinces, represented by deep-level plumbing systems consisting of giant dike swarms, sill provinces and layered intrusions. The most capable large igneous provinces in Canada are Archean greenstone belts estimated at 3.8 to 2.5 billion years old, containing a rare volcanic rock called komatiite.

== Hydrography ==
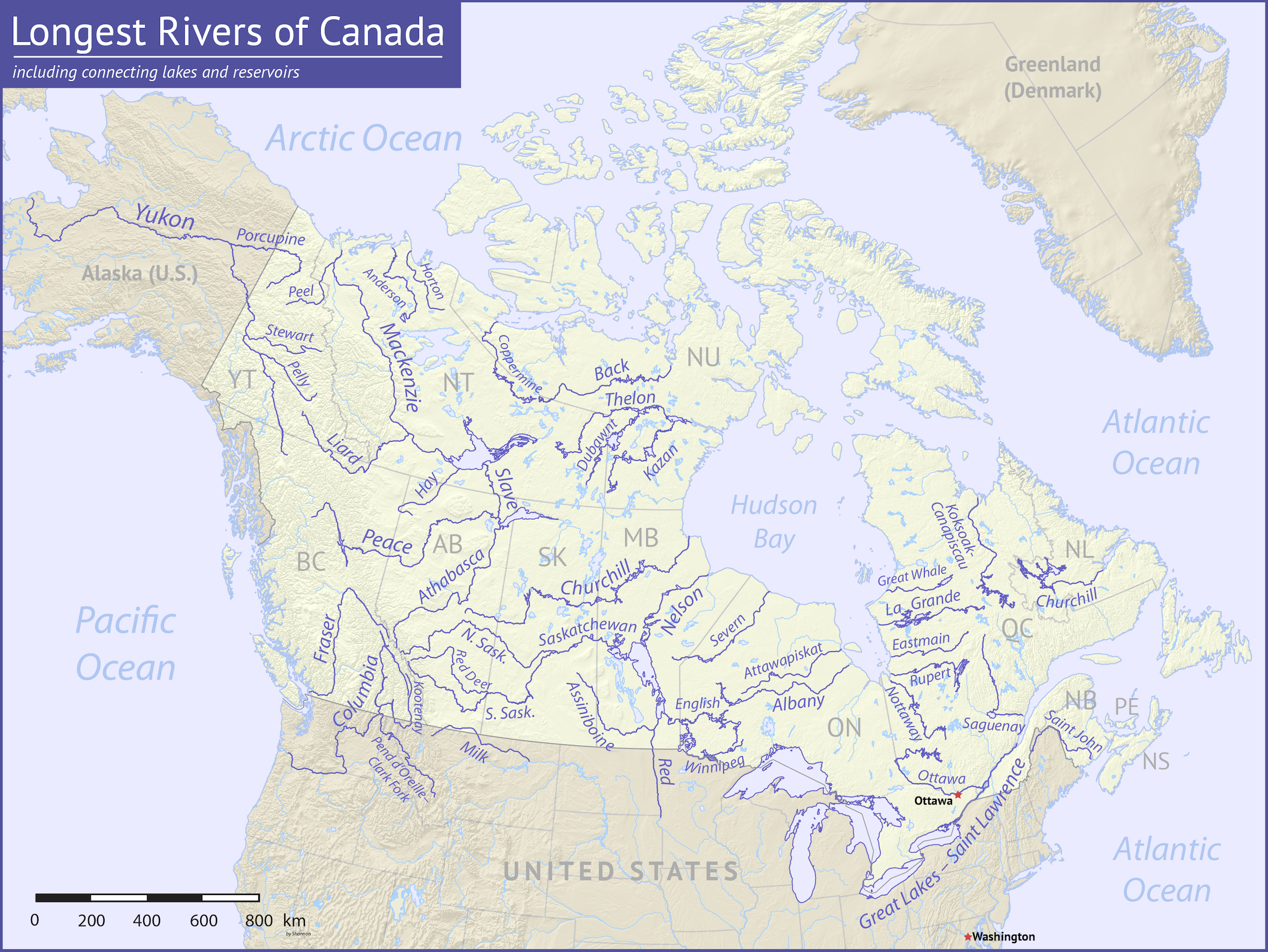
Rivers of Canada

Canada holds vast reserves of water: its rivers discharge nearly 7% of the world's renewable water supply, Canada has over 2,000,000 lakes—563 greater than 100 square kilometres (39 sq mi)—which is more than any other country and has the third largest amount of glacier water. Canada is also home to about twenty five per cent (134.6 million ha) of the world's wetlands that support a vast array of local ecosystems.

Canada's waterways host forty-seven rivers of at least 600 kilometres (370 mi) in length, with the two longest being the Mackenzie River, that begins at Great Slave Lake and ends in the Arctic Ocean, with its drainage basin covering a large part of northwestern Canada, and the Saint Lawrence River, which drains the Great Lakes into the Gulf of St. Lawrence ending in the Atlantic Ocean. The Mackenzie, including its tributaries is over 4,200 kilometres (2,600 mi) in length and lies within the second largest drainage basin of North America, while the St. Lawrence 3,058 kilometres (1,900 mi) in length, drains the world's largest system of freshwater lakes.

The Atlantic watershed drains the entirety of the Atlantic provinces (parts of the Quebec-Labrador border are fixed at the Atlantic Ocean-Arctic Ocean continental divide), most of inhabited Quebec and large parts of southern Ontario. It is mostly drained by the economically important St. Lawrence River and its tributaries, notably the Saguenay, Manicouagan, and Ottawa rivers. The Great Lakes and Lake Nipigon are also drained by the St. Lawrence. The Churchill River and Saint John River are other important elements of the Atlantic watershed in Canada.

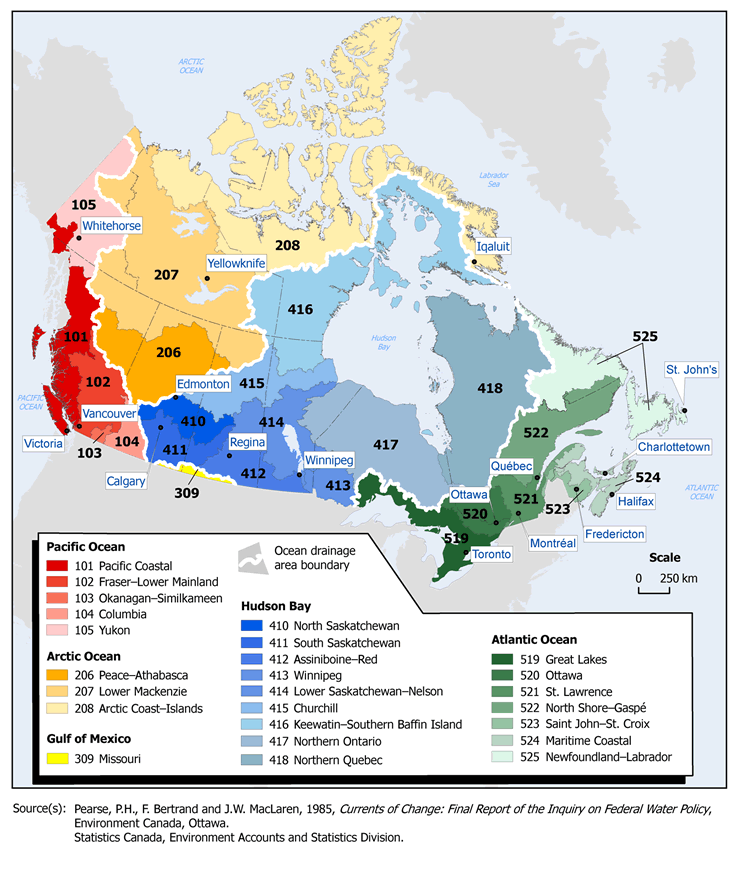
Drainage basins of Canada

The Hudson Bay watershed drains over a third of Canada. It covers Manitoba, northern Ontario and Quebec, most of Saskatchewan, southern Alberta, southwestern Nunavut, and the southern half of Baffin Island. This basin is most important in fighting drought in the prairies and producing hydroelectricity, especially in Manitoba, northern Ontario and Quebec. Major elements of this watershed include Lake Winnipeg, Nelson River, the North Saskatchewan and South Saskatchewan Rivers, Assiniboine River, and Nettilling Lake on Baffin Island. Wollaston Lake lies on the boundary between the Hudson Bay and Arctic Ocean watersheds and drains into both. It is the largest lake in the world that naturally drains in two directions.

The continental divide in the Rockies separates the Pacific watershed in British Columbia and Yukon from the Arctic and Hudson Bay watersheds. This watershed irrigates the agriculturally important areas of inner British Columbia (such as the Okanagan and Kootenay valleys), and is used to produce hydroelectricity. Major elements are the Yukon, Columbia and Fraser rivers.

The northern parts of Alberta, Manitoba, and British Columbia, most of Northwest Territories and Nunavut, and parts of Yukon are drained by the Arctic watershed. This watershed has been little used for hydroelectricity, with the exception of the Mackenzie River. The Peace, Athabasca and Liard Rivers, as well as Great Bear Lake and Great Slave Lake (respectively the largest and second largest lakes wholly enclosed by Canada) are significant elements of the Arctic watershed. Each of these elements eventually merges with the Mackenzie, thereby draining the vast majority of the Arctic watershed.

The southernmost part of Alberta drains into the Gulf of Mexico through the Milk River and its tributaries. The Milk River originates in the Rocky Mountains of Montana, then flows into Alberta, then returns into the United States, where it is drained by the Missouri River. A small area of southwestern Saskatchewan is drained by Battle Creek, which empties into the Milk River.

== Natural resources ==
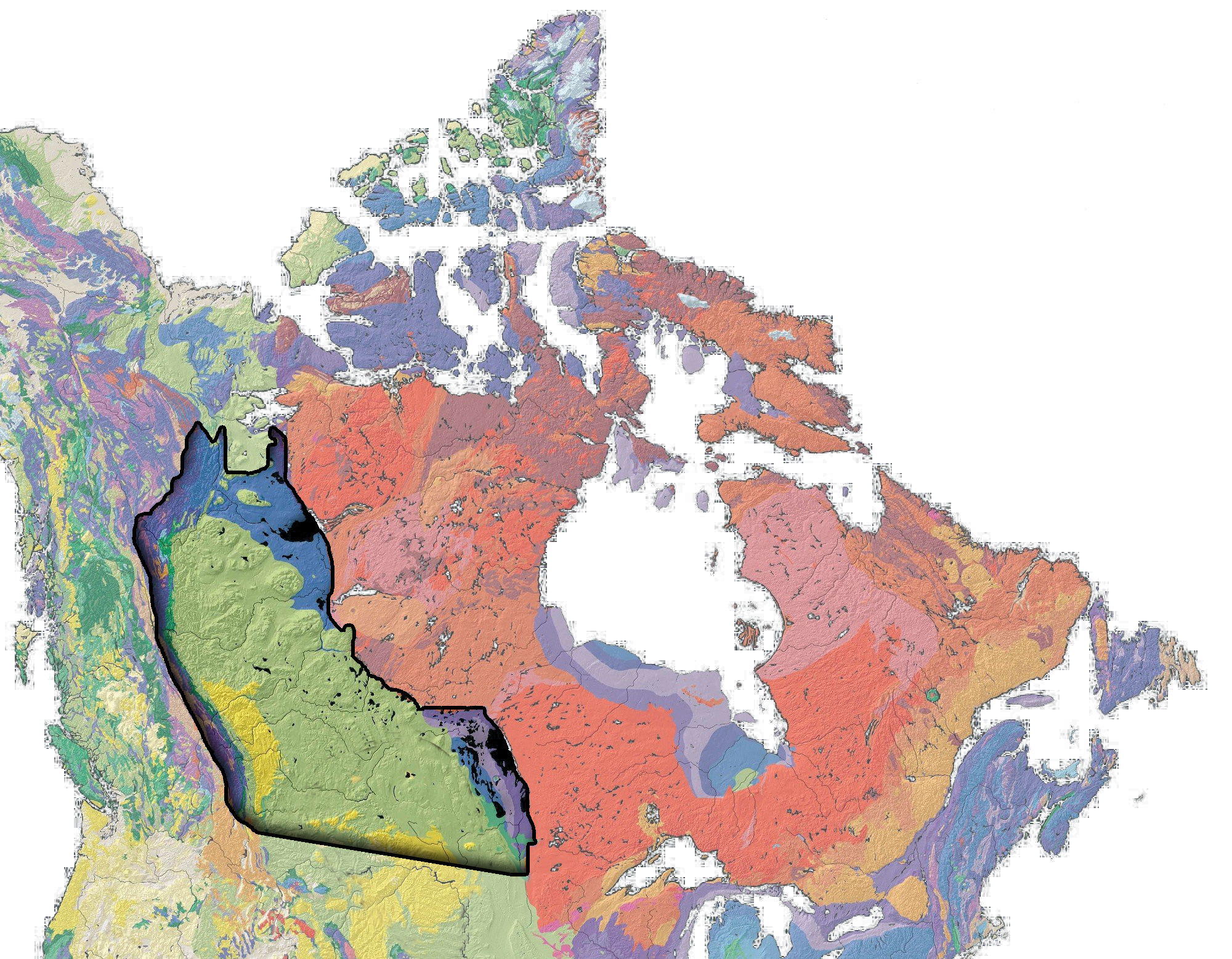
The bulk of oil and gas production occurs in the Western Canadian Sedimentary Basin (mostly light green), which stretches from southwestern Manitoba to northeastern British Columbia.

Canada's abundance of natural resources is reflected in their continued importance in the economy of Canada. Major resource-based industries are fisheries, forestry, agriculture, petroleum products and mining.

The fisheries industry has historically been one of Canada's strongest. Unmatched cod stocks on the Grand Banks of Newfoundland launched this industry in the 16th century. Today these stocks are nearly depleted, and their conservation has become a preoccupation of the Atlantic Provinces. On the West Coast, tuna stocks are now restricted. The less depleted (but still greatly diminished) salmon population continues to drive a strong fisheries industry. Canada claims 22 km (12 nmi) of territorial sea, a contiguous zone of 44 km (24 nmi), an exclusive economic zone of 5,599,077 km^{2} (2,161,816 mi^{2}) with 370 km (200 nmi) and a continental shelf of 370 km (200 nmi) or to the edge of the continental margin.

Five per cent of Canada's land area is arable, none of which is for permanent crops. Three per cent of Canada's land area is covered by permanent pastures. Canada has 7,200 square kilometres (2,800 mi^{2}) of irrigated land (1993 estimate). Agricultural regions in Canada include the Canadian Prairies, the Lower Mainland and various regions within the Interior of British Columbia, the St. Lawrence Basin and the Canadian Maritimes. Main crops in Canada include flax, oats, wheat, maize, barley, sugar beets and rye in the prairies; flax and maize in Western Ontario; Oats and potatoes in the Maritimes. Fruit and vegetables are grown primarily in the Annapolis Valley of Nova Scotia, Southwestern Ontario, the Golden Horseshoe region of Ontario, along the south coast of Georgian Bay and in the Okanagan Valley of British Columbia. Cattle and sheep are raised in the valleys and plateaus of British Columbia. Cattle, sheep and hogs are raised on the prairies, cattle and hogs in Western Ontario, sheep and hogs in Quebec, and sheep in the Maritimes. There are significant dairy regions in central Nova Scotia, southern New Brunswick, the St. Lawrence Valley, northeastern Ontario, southwestern Ontario, the Red River valley of Manitoba and the valleys in the British Columbia Interior, on Vancouver Island and in the Lower Mainland.

Fossil fuels are a more recently developed resource in Canada, with oil and gas being extracted from deposits in the Western Canadian Sedimentary Basin since the mid-1900s. While Canada's crude oil deposits are fewer, technological developments in recent decades have opened up oil production in Alberta's Oil Sands to the point where Canada now has some of the largest reserves of oil in the world. In other forms, Canadian industry has a long history of extracting large coal and natural gas reserves.

Canada's mineral resources are diverse and extensive. Across the Canadian Shield and in the north there are large iron, nickel, zinc, copper, gold, lead, molybdenum, and uranium reserves. Large diamond concentrations have been recently developed in the Arctic, making Canada one of the world's largest producers. Throughout the Shield there are many mining towns extracting these minerals. The largest, and best known, is Sudbury, Ontario. Sudbury is an exception to the normal process of forming minerals in the Shield since there is significant evidence that the Sudbury Basin is an ancient meteorite impact crater. The nearby, but less known Temagami Magnetic Anomaly has striking similarities to the Sudbury Basin. Its magnetic anomalies are very similar to the Sudbury Basin, and so it could be a second metal-rich impact crater. The Shield is also covered by vast boreal forests that support an important logging industry.

Canada's many rivers have afforded extensive development of hydroelectric power. Extensively developed in British Columbia, Ontario, Quebec and Labrador, the many dams have long provided a low carbon, dependable source of energy.

== Environmental issues ==
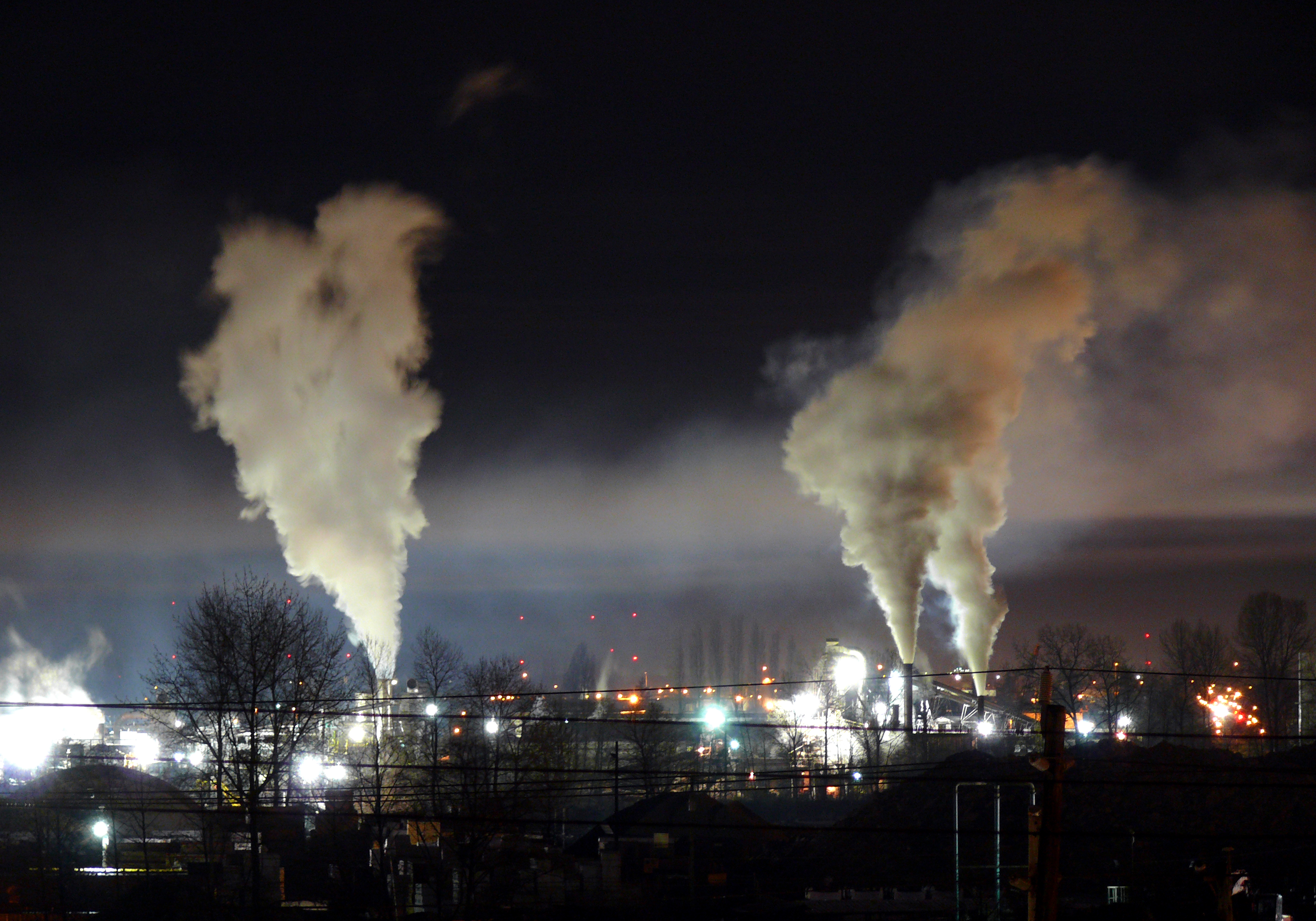
Industry is a significant source of air pollution in Canada.

Air pollution and resulting acid rain severely affects lakes and damages forests. Metal smelting, coal-burning utilities, and vehicle emissions impact agricultural and forest productivity. Ocean waters are also becoming contaminated by agricultural, industrial, mining, and forestry activities.

Global climate change and the warming of the polar region will likely cause significant changes to the environment, including loss of the polar bear, the exploration for resource then the extraction of these resources and an alternative transport route to the Panama Canal through the Northwest Passage.

Canada is currently warming at twice the global average, and this is effectively irreversible.

== Political geography ==
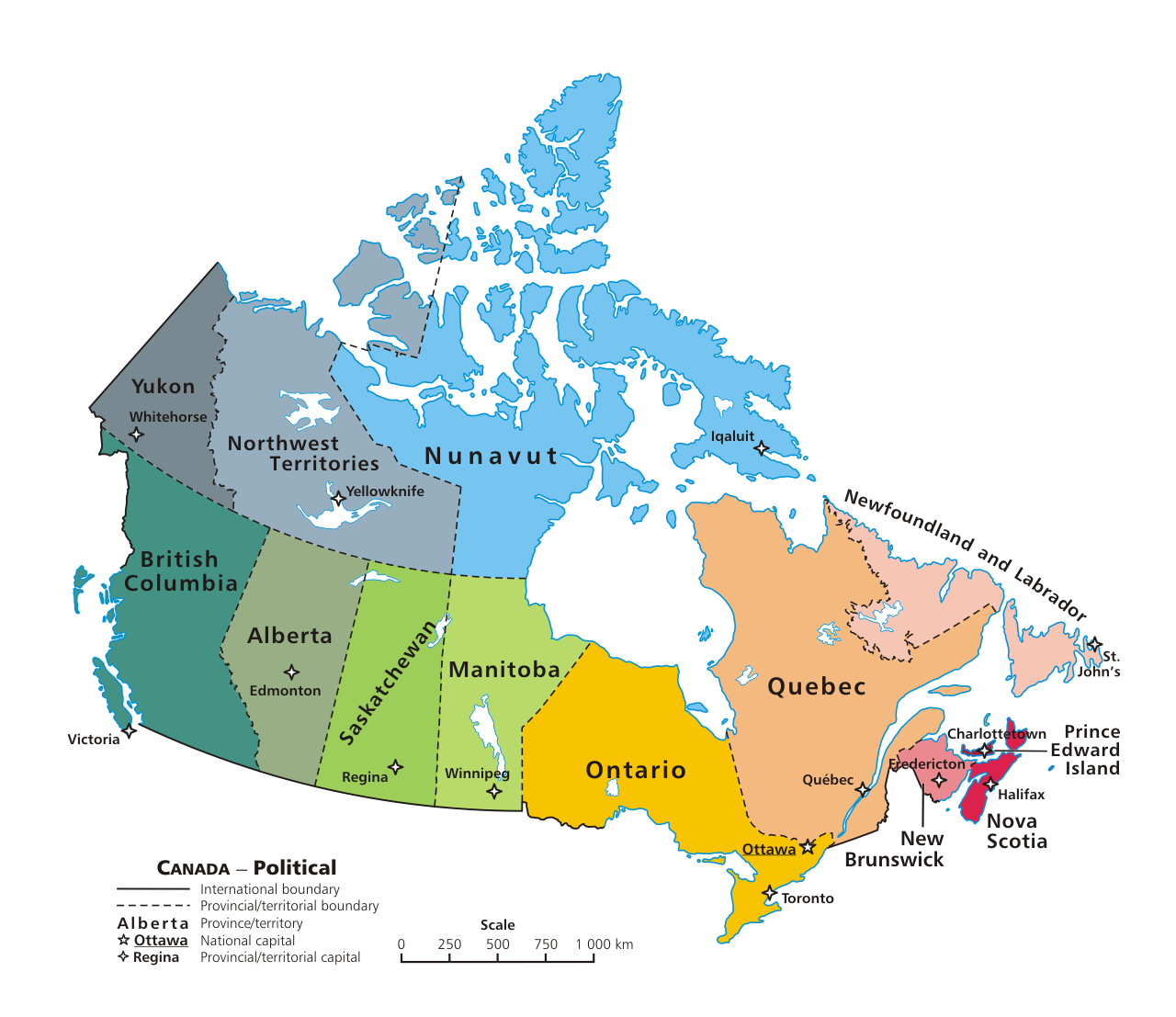
A political map of Canada showing its 10 provinces and three territories

Canada is divided into ten provinces and three territories. According to Statistics Canada, 72.0 per cent of the population is concentrated within 150 kilometres (93 mi) of the nation's southern border with the United States, 70.0% live south of the 49th parallel, and over 60 per cent of the population lives along the Great Lakes and St. Lawrence River between Windsor, Ontario, and Quebec City. This leaves the vast majority of Canada's territory as sparsely populated wilderness; Canada's population density is 3.5 people per square kilometre (9.1 people/mi^{2}), among the lowest in the world. Despite this, 79.7 per cent of Canada's population resides in urban areas, where population densities are increasing.

Canada shares with the US the world's longest binational border at 8,893 kilometres (5,526 mi); 2,477 kilometres (1,539 mi) are with Alaska. The Danish island dependency of Greenland lies to Canada's northeast, separated from the Canadian Arctic islands by Baffin Bay and Davis Strait. As of 14 June 2022, Canada shares a land border with Greenland on Hans Island. The French islands of Saint Pierre and Miquelon lie off the southern coast of Newfoundland in the Gulf of St. Lawrence and have a maritime territorial enclave within Canada's exclusive economic zone.

Canada's geographic proximity to the United States has historically bound the two countries together in the political world as well. Canada's position between the Soviet Union (now Russia) and the US was strategically important during the Cold War since the route over the North Pole and Canada was the fastest route by air between the two countries and the most direct route for intercontinental ballistic missiles. Since the end of the Cold War, there has been growing speculation that Canada's Arctic maritime claims may become increasingly important if global warming melts the ice enough to open the Northwest Passage.

== See also ==
Geography by province
- Atlas of Canada
- Canadian Geographic
- Canadian Rockies
- Cottage country
- Extreme points of North America
- List of highest points of Canadian provinces and territories
- National Parks of Canada
- List of Ultras of Canada
- Mountain peaks of Canada
- Rural Canada
