= Fishbasket Lake =

Lake in Ontario, Canada

- lac Fishbasket
- Location in Ontario
- Location: Kenora District, Ontario
- Coordinates: 52°36′33″N 87°57′09″W
- Part of: Hudson Bay drainage basin
- Primary inflows: Mameigwess Lake
- Primary outflows: Fishbasket River
- Basin countries: Canada
- Max. length: 14 kilometres (8.7 mi)
- Max. width: 2 kilometres (1.2 mi)
- Surface elevation: 245 metres (804 ft)

Fishbasket Lake (French: lac Fishbasket) is a lake in the Unorganized Part of Kenora District in northwestern Ontario, Canada. The lake is in the Hudson Bay drainage basin and is the source of the Fishbasket River.

The lake is 14 kilometres (8.7 mi) long and 2 kilometres (1.2 mi) wide, and lies at an elevation of 245 metres (804 ft).

The primary inflow is the water arriving directly from Mameigwess Lake at the centre east of the lake. The primary outflow, at the northwest tip of the lake, is the Fishbasket River, which flows to Winisk Lake, and then via the Winisk River to Hudson Bay.
