= Mameigwess Lake (Fishbasket Lake) =

- lac Mameigwess
- Location in Ontario
- Location: Kenora District, Ontario
- Coordinates: 52°33′45″N 87°51′10″W
- Type: Lake
- Part of: Hudson Bay drainage basin
- Primary inflows: Michikenopik Creek
- Primary outflows: Fishbasket Lake
- Basin countries: Canada
- Surface elevation: 245 metres (804 ft)

Mameigwess Lake (French: lac Mameigwess) is an irregularly shaped lake in the north of the Unorganized Part of Kenora District in northwestern Ontario, Canada. The lake is in the Hudson Bay drainage basin.

The lake lies at an elevation of 245 metres (804 ft).

The only named inflow is Michikenopik Creek at the southwest corner of the lake; there are numerous other unnamed inflows. The primary outflow is a channel, at the northwest, to Fishbasket Lake, which flows via the Fishbasket River, Winisk Lake, and the Winisk River to Hudson Bay.
