= Obabika Lake (Northwestern Ontario) =

- Location in Ontario
- Location: Kenora District, Ontario
- Coordinates: 51°52′30″N 90°54′53″W
- Type: Lake
- Etymology: Ojibwe for "One lake that is almost two"
- Part of: Hudson Bay drainage basin
- Basin countries: Canada
- Max. length: 4.2 kilometres (2.6 mi)
- Max. width: 2.5 kilometres (1.6 mi)
- Surface elevation: 373 metres (1,224 ft)

Obabika Lake is a lake in Kenora District in Northeastern Ontario, Canada. It is part of the Hudson Bay drainage basin.

The primary inflows are the Morris River, at the northwest, arriving from Dehoux Lake, and the outflow via the Obabika Narrows from Otoonabee Lake, at the east. The primary outflow, at the north, is also the Morris River, which flows via the Pipestone River and the Winisk River to Hudson Bay.

The entire lake is within Pipestone River Provincial Park.

== See also ==
- List of lakes in Ontario
