= Wunnummin Lake =

Lake in Kenora District, Ontario, Canada

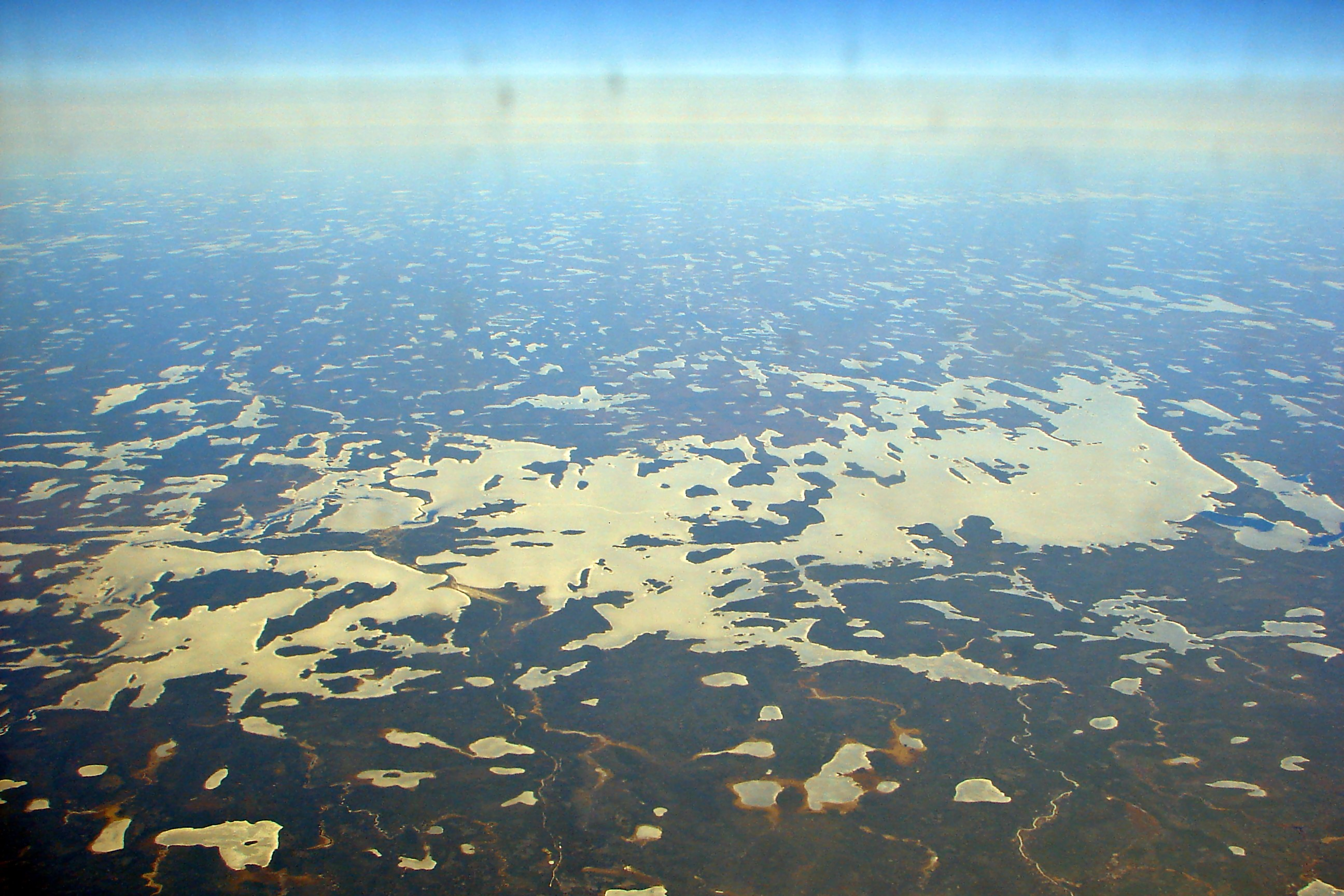

- Location within Ontario
- Location: Ontario, Canada
- Coordinates: 52°56′06″N 89°09′55″W
- Primary inflows: Pipestone River
- Primary outflows: Winisk River
- Basin countries: Canada
- Surface elevation: 242 m (794 ft)

Wunnummin Lake is a lake in northwestern Ontario, Canada. It is a remote freshwater lake, located in Kenora District.

The Wunnumin 1 Indian reserve of the Wunnumin Lake First Nation is located in the southwestern part of the lake.

== See also ==
- List of lakes in Ontario
