= Obabika Lake =

Obabika Lake may refer to:

- Obabika Lake (Northeastern Ontario)
- Obabika Lake (Northwestern Ontario)
