= Frog Rapids =

Frog Rapids may refer to one of two rapids in Kenora District, Ontario, Canada:

- Frog Rapids at Frog Rapids Narrows on the English River near Sioux Lookout
- Frog Rapids, further north, on the Pipestone River in the Hudson Bay watershed
