= Wunnumin Lake First Nation =

Human settlement in Ontario, Canada

Coordinates: 52°51′07″N 89°17′10″W

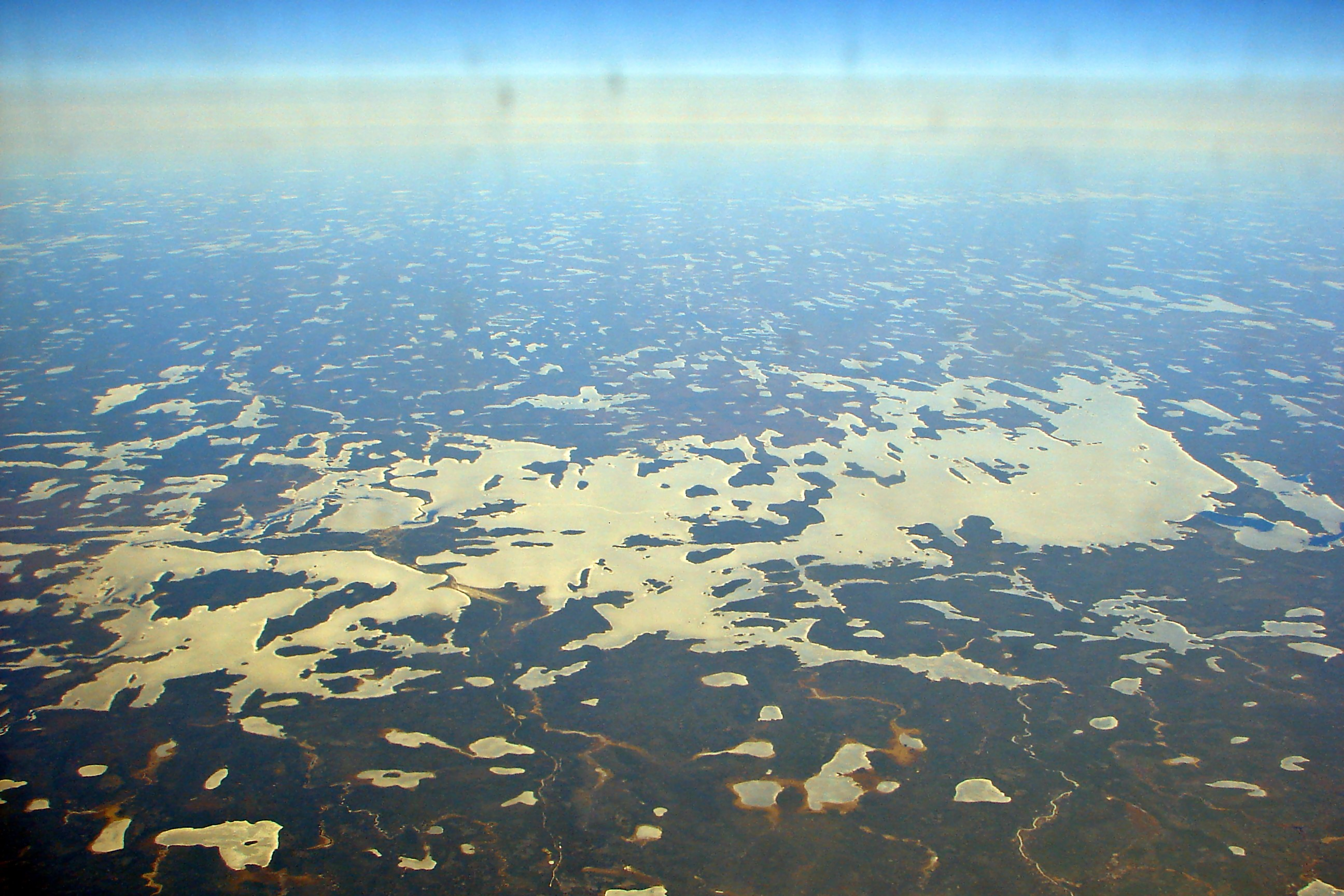
Aerial view of Wunnummin Lake, with the community of Wunnumin Lake in centre left.

Wunnumin Lake First Nation (Oji-Cree language: ᐊᐧᓇᒪᐣ ᓵᑲᐦᐃᑲᓃᕽ (Wanaman-zaaga'iganiing, "At Wunnumin Lake"); unpointed: ᐊᐧᓇᒪᐣ ᓴᑲᐃᑲᓂᐠ) is an Oji-Cree First Nation band government who inhabit territory on Wunnummin Lake 360 kilometres (220 mi) northeast of Sioux Lookout in northwestern Ontario, Canada. It consists of two reserves: the main reserve Wunnumin 1 and the nearby Wunnumin 2. Its registered population as of January 2007 was 565.

== Transportation ==
Wunnumin Lake First Nation can be accessed primarily through air transportation to Wunnumin Lake Airport; however, during the winter season, one can also travel to this community using the winter roads, The White Highway.

== Policing ==
Wunnumin Lake is policed by the Nishnawbe-Aski Police Service, an Aboriginal-based service.

== History ==
Wunnumin Lake is called Wanaman-zaaga'igan meaning "Vermillion Lake", in reference to the vermillion-coloured clay about the lake. Legend says that Wiisagejaak (the "Crane manidoo") used to hunt for food, found "Big Beaver" that lived on the Pipestone River and chased "Big Beaver" and its baby beaver to this area. When Wiisagejaak caught up with "Big Beaver" and its baby beaver, he killed the baby beaver and put it aside in this particular area with foliage; as the baby beaver laid there in this foliage, it bled from its wound. The blood from the baby beaver's wound seeped into the ground, staining the clay to this colour.

Residents of Wunnumin Lake originated from Big Beaver House, Ontario. After a large forest fire, the community at Big Beaver House relocated to two separate location, of which one was Wunnumin Lake. During 1929–1930 the leaders of Wunnumin Lake First Nation were summoned to Big Trout Lake to participate in the signing of the adhesion to Treaty 9. Its current government obtained their Reserve status on March 2, 1976.

== Government ==
The current Chief is Logan Winnepetonga, and the Deputy Chief is Dean Cromarty. Lawrence Gliddy, Clarence Anderson, Sheila Angees and Simon Winnepetonga are serving as Band Councillors. The next General Election for Chief and Council is in September 2020. Wunnumin Lake First Nation is affiliated with Shibogama First Nations Council.

Wunnumin Lake First Nation has two reserves: a 5,855.1-hectare (14,468-acre) Wunnumin 1 Reserve and a 3,794.4-hectare (9,376-acre) Wunnumin 2 Reserve.

The departments and programs offered by Wunnumin Lake First Nation are:

- Administration
- Crisis Prevention
- Economic Development
- Education Authority
- Health Authority
- Lands & Resources
- Public Works
- Social Workers
- Welfare
