= Wunnumin 2 =

- Indian reserve
- Wunnumin Indian Reserve No. 2
- Location within Ontario
- Coordinates: 52°51′N 89°05′W
- Country: Canada
- Province: Ontario
- District: Kenora
- First Nation: Wunnumin Lake

Area
  - Land: 37.94 km^{2} (14.65 sq mi)

Wunnumin 2 is a First Nations reserve in Kenora District, Ontario. It is one of the reserves of the Wunnumin Lake First Nation.
