= Pacific Cordillera (Canada) =

Top-level physiographic region of Canada

The Pacific Cordillera, also known as the Western Cordillera or simply The Cordillera, is a top-level physiographic region of Canada, referring mainly to the extensive cordillera system in Western and Northwestern Canada that constitutes the northern part of the North American Cordillera. The mountain ranges in this region were covered during the Pleistocene by the Cordilleran Ice Sheet, the extent of which gives perspective on the geographic extent of this region. The cordillera extends from the Alaska's Brooks and Alaska Ranges, southeast through most of the Yukon and British Columbia as well as the southwestern fringe of Northwest Territories and Alberta (bordered by the Mackenzie-Peel/Liard River basin and the Canadian Prairies in the east), to stretch its margin beyond the Canada–United States border with five extensive lobes reaching into the mountain valleys of Montana and Washington.

The Pacific Cordillera was formed by the collision of tectonic plates, causing the crust to buckle and creating the mountain ranges that are known today. This is the youngest of the three primary geographic regions of Canada, the others being the Canadian Shield and Interior Plains. This designation is peculiar to Canada because the country's intermontane plateaus are narrow and may be considered together with adjoining ranges.

Well-known mountain ranges in the Pacific Cordillera include the famous Canadian Rockies, the Coast Mountains and the Skagit Range of the North Cascades. Such places are major tourist attractions, such as the popular Sunshine Coast and Sea-to-Sky Corridor, and are the geographical basis of a sizable portion of the economy of the Canadian province of British Columbia.

== See also ==
- Arctic Cordillera
- Geography of Canada
