= Hudson Bay Lowlands =

Wetland located between the Canadian Shield and Hudson Bay

Coordinates: 54°45′N 83°00′W

The Hudson Bay Lowlands is a vast wetland located between the Canadian Shield and southern shores of Hudson Bay and James Bay. Most of the area lies within the province of Ontario, with smaller portions reaching into Manitoba and Quebec. Many wide and slow-moving rivers flow through this area toward the saltwater of Hudson Bay: these include the Churchill, Nelson and Hayes in Manitoba, Severn, Fawn, Winisk, Asheweig, Ekwan, Attawapiskat, and Albany in Ontario, and the Harricana, Rupert and Eastmain in Quebec. This is the largest wetland in Canada, and one of the largest in the world. The region can be subdivided into three bands running roughly northwest to southeast: the Coastal Hudson Bay Lowland (a narrow band along the northern coast), Hudson Bay Lowland (a broader band extending to slightly south of the Ekwan River), and James Bay Lowland (all the rest of the southern/eastern lands, making up close to 50% of the total Lowlands area).

The entire area was covered by ice during the last glaciation, and the peatlands have accumulated over the last 10,000 years. Striations of muskeg like "tiger stripes up and down the Earth" represent stages in the receding coastline of the Tyrrell Sea (a term for prehistoric Hudson Bay). Plants from the boreal forest mix with arctic species. A majority of the wetland is peat bog and fen, although salt marshes occur along the coast, and marshes and wet meadows occur along the major rivers. The wetlands provide important habitat for migratory birds including shorebirds (e.g., yellow rail) and waterfowl (e.g., snow geese). Large mammals include polar bears and wolverines.

The Hudson Bay Lowlands approximately coincide with the Southern Hudson Bay taiga ecoregion of North America.

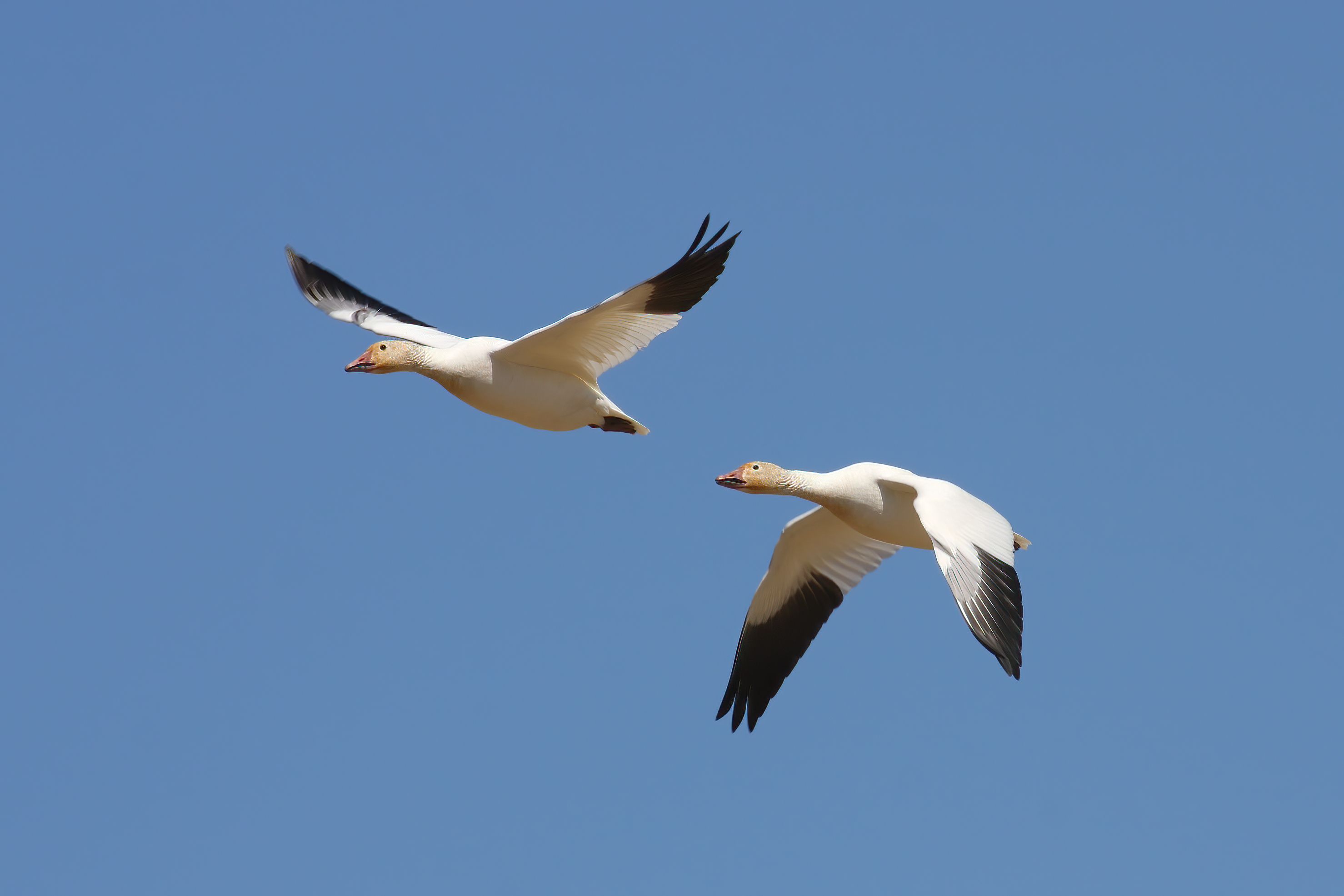
Snow geese migrate north each year to breed in the coastal marshes of the Hudson Bay Lowlands.

== Early discoveries and exploration ==
The local Ojibwa and Cree most likely came into contact with the region but did not populate the region due to the harsh, undesirable conditions and poor drainage patterns of the area. When Europeans arrived in the area, the Hudson's Bay Company set up trading posts such as Rankin Inlet, some of which remain populated today. However, these never grew into sizable towns, again because of the poor living conditions and climate. To this day, not all of the lowlands have been fully explored, Adam Shoalts for example in 2012 was the first person to traverse the length of the Again River where he discovered numerous waterfalls and other previously unknown geographic features. There are a few small First Nations settlements on the southern shore of Hudson Bay Lowlands at places like Moose Factory, Moosonee, Attawapiskat, and Fort Severn.

== Geography ==
The region is named after the nearby inland sea, Hudson Bay, the second largest in the world. The entire area drains into the bay through rivers such as the Churchill, Severn, and Attawapiskat. The region is located in the extreme north of Ontario, extending into both Manitoba to the west and Quebec in the east, and covers around 25 percent of Ontario's total land area (approximately 228,400 km^{2}). The area was covered in ice during the last glacial maximum, and then flooded as the ice receded, leaving behind plains that are slowly rising out of the ocean due to post-glacial rebound. Muskeg, comprising peaty bogs and fens, now cover much of the landscape, with other kinds of wetlands along rivers and the coast. The climate of the region depends largely on the water surface of the bay, which heats rapidly in the summer, breaking the ice and bringing rains to the lowlands. In the winter, the bay freezes over again, bringing freezing temperatures and winds. The soil is almost entirely peatland, dominated by lichen, moss, and sedges, with a mix of boreal forest, arctic, and sub-arctic plant species.

== Industries ==
The forestry industry is present in the coniferous forests of the region. There is a growing tourist industry which includes fly-fishing and beluga and seal-watching excursions.

The Hudson Bay Lowlands also contain vast mineral deposits, particularly chromite and nickel. The Ring of Fire development project plans to build roads to enable resource extraction. Plans for development in the area are under undergoing environmental assessment.

== See also ==
- Geology of Ontario
- Geography of Canada
