= Southern James Bay =

Wetland in Ontario, Canada

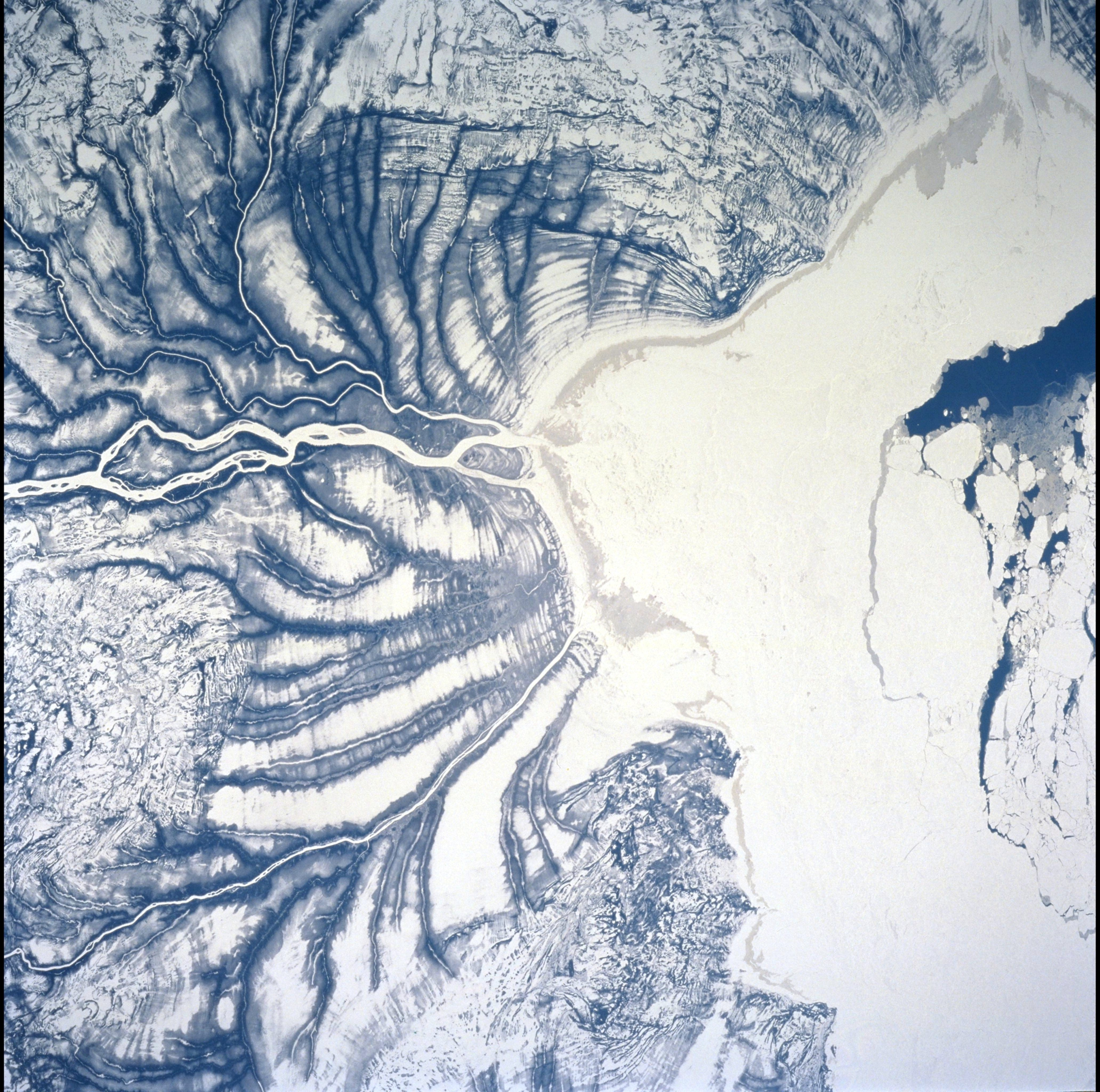
- Satellite view of the frozen Hannah Bay and Harricana River
- Interactive map of Southern James Bay
- Location: James Bay
- Coordinates: 51°20′N 80°25′W

Ramsar Wetland
- Designated: 27 May 1987
- Reference no.: 367

Southern James Bay is a coastal wetland complex in northeastern Ontario, Canada bordering James Bay and Quebec. It was designated as a wetland of international importance via the Ramsar Convention on May 27, 1987. The shallow waters of the James Bay region represent an important late autumn staging area for migratory, Arctic-breeding waterbirds.

Two migratory bird sanctuaries are located in the complex: the 14.6 square kilometres (5.6 sq mi) Moose River Bird Sanctuary is at the mouth of the Moose River, and the larger 238.3 square kilometres (92.0 sq mi) Hannah Bay Bird Sanctuary on the eastern coast of Hannah Bay at the mouth of the Harricana River. As many as 75,000 geese of various species may simultaneously use the staging area in autumn, and large populations of ducks are also easily observed. "Substantial numbers of diving sea ducks occur offshore." The sites are located on Ontario Crown land, except for outlying islands that are part of the Nunavut, which are federal Crown land. They are demarcated to prevent hunting within their boundaries, a policy which is enforced. Hunting is permitted in adjacent land.

Southern James Bay lies within the flat sedimentary basin of the Hudson Bay lowland in the Hudson Plains ecozone, and its coast is "characterised by a sequence of mudflats, intertidal marshes and supertidal meadow-marshes, which grade through a willow-alder shrub area into a drier forest interspersed with fens and bogs". Gradually rising inland from sea level, it attains elevations of no more than 50 metres (160 ft).
