= Polar Bear Provincial Park =

Provincial park in Ontario, Canada

- IUCN category II (national park)
- Location within Ontario
- Interactive map of Polar Bear Provincial Park
- Location: Ontario, Canada
- Nearest city: Peawanuck, Ontario
- Coordinates: 54°45′42″N 83°02′20″W
- Area: 23,552 km^{2} (9,093 sq mi)
- Established: 1970
- Governing body: Ontario Parks
- Website: Polar Bear Provincial Park

Ramsar Wetland
- Designated: 27 May 1987
- Reference no.: 360

Polar Bear Provincial Park is an isolated wilderness park in the far north of Ontario, Canada. It lies on the western shore where James Bay joins Hudson Bay. The terrain is part of the Hudson Bay Lowlands and features unspoiled low-lying tundra in the Hudson Plains ecozone.

Administered by Ontario Parks, the 23,552-square-kilometre (9,093 sq mi) Polar Bear Provincial Park is the largest park in Ontario. It has no visitor facilities, is reachable only by air, and special permission is required before visiting it. Its primary purpose is the preservation of habitat for wildlife, especially the several hundred polar bears that migrate through the area.

Visitors to Polar Bear should be prepared for any eventuality. They should bring at least one week's extra supplies in case their departure is delayed due to bad weather. Tents should not rise any higher than necessary, due to the possibility of strong winds. Polar Bear Provincial Park has been designated as a Wetland of International Importance under the Ramsar Convention since May 1987.

== See also ==
- List of Ontario Parks
