= James Bay =

Bay on the southern end of the Hudson Bay, Canada

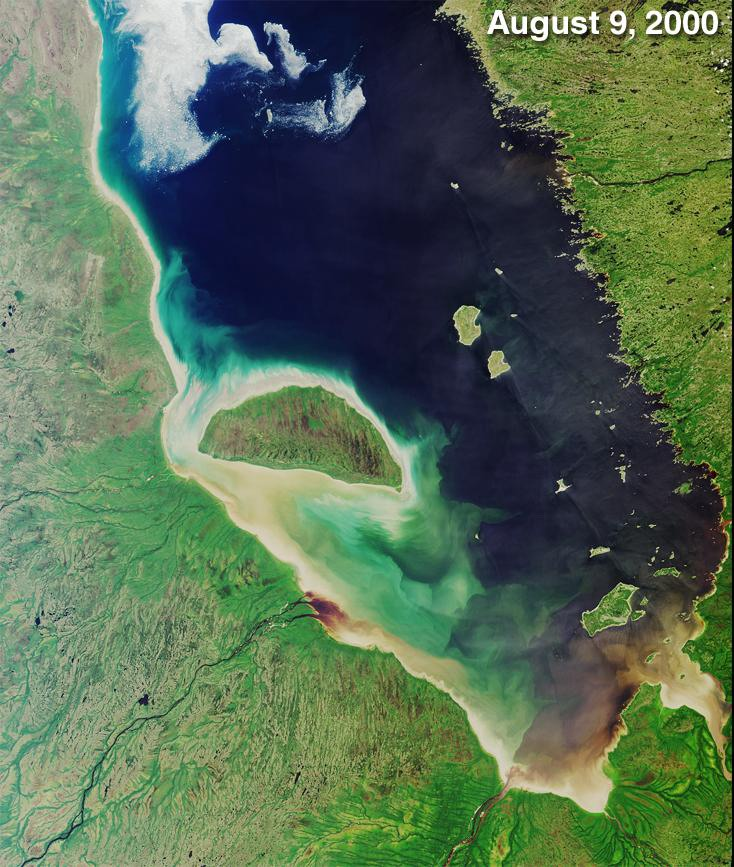
- A satellite image of James Bay

- Location within Ontario
- Location: Southern end of Hudson Bay, between the shores of Ontario and Quebec (waters and islands are in Nunavut)
- Coordinates: 53°30′N 80°30′W
- Basin countries: Canada
- Max. length: 443 km (275 mi)
- Max. width: 217 km (135 mi)
- Surface area: 68,300 km^{2} (26,400 mi^{2})
- Average depth: 60 m (200 ft)

James Bay (French: Baie James, pronounced [bɛ dʒɛmz]; Cree: ᐐᓂᐯᒄ, romanized: Wînipekw, lit. 'dirty water') is a body of water located on the southern end of Hudson Bay in Canada. Its shorelines are in the provinces of Quebec and Ontario; its islands, surface waters, and depths are in Nunavut. Its largest island is Akimiski.

Numerous waterways of the James Bay watershed have been modified with dams or diversions for several major hydroelectric projects, while still attracting river-based recreation. Several communities are located near or alongside James Bay, including a number of Aboriginal Canadian communities, such as the Kashechewan First Nation and nine communities affiliated with the Cree of northern Quebec.

James Bay is the last part of Hudson Bay to freeze over in winter, and the first to thaw in summer.

== History ==
Human presence along the shores of the bay began after the retreat of the glaciers at the end of the last ice age, around 8,150 years ago. A variety of indigenous cultures have lived in this area. At the time of contact with Europeans, the indigenous peoples along both shores of the bay were ethnically Cree peoples.

Henry Hudson is believed to have been the first European to enter the bay, when he explored it in 1610 as part of his exploration of the larger bay that was named for him. This southerly bay was named in honour of Thomas James, a Welsh captain who explored the area more thoroughly in 1630 and 1631.

James Bay is important in the history of Canada as one of the most hospitable parts of the Hudson Bay region, although it has had a low human population. It was an area of importance to the Hudson's Bay Company and British expansion into Canada. The fur-trapping duo of explorers Pierre-Esprit Radisson and Médard des Groseilliers convinced the English Crown, primarily Prince Rupert of the Rhine, a favoured nephew of Charles I and cousin to Charles II, that a colonial enterprise in the north would yield wealth in minerals and fur. Des Groseilliers accompanied Captain Zachariah Gillam on the ketch Nonsuch and they jointly founded Charles Fort, the first European fur-trading post on James Bay.

Their success was such that the company was chartered by Charles II on their return, although they did not bring any minerals. This charter granted a complete trading monopoly to the company of the whole Hudson Bay basin, which includes James Bay. At the same time, the first English colony on what is now mainland Canada, Rupert's Land, was formed, with the first "capital" designated at Charles Fort. The first colonial governor, Charles Baley (various spellings exist, including but not limited to "Bailey"), was a Quaker, and this is believed to have been a factor in his respectful relations with the company's trading partners, the First Nations.

Significant fur trapping has continued in the region. In general, the east coast or East Main of James Bay was too easily accessed by French and independent traders from the south. The Hudson's Bay Company emphasised from an early period trading relations with nations of interior trapping grounds, reached from the west coasts of James and Hudson bays. East Main was, nevertheless, the gateway to British settlements in what would become Manitoba (Winnipeg, for example) and as far west as the Rocky Mountains.

== Geography ==
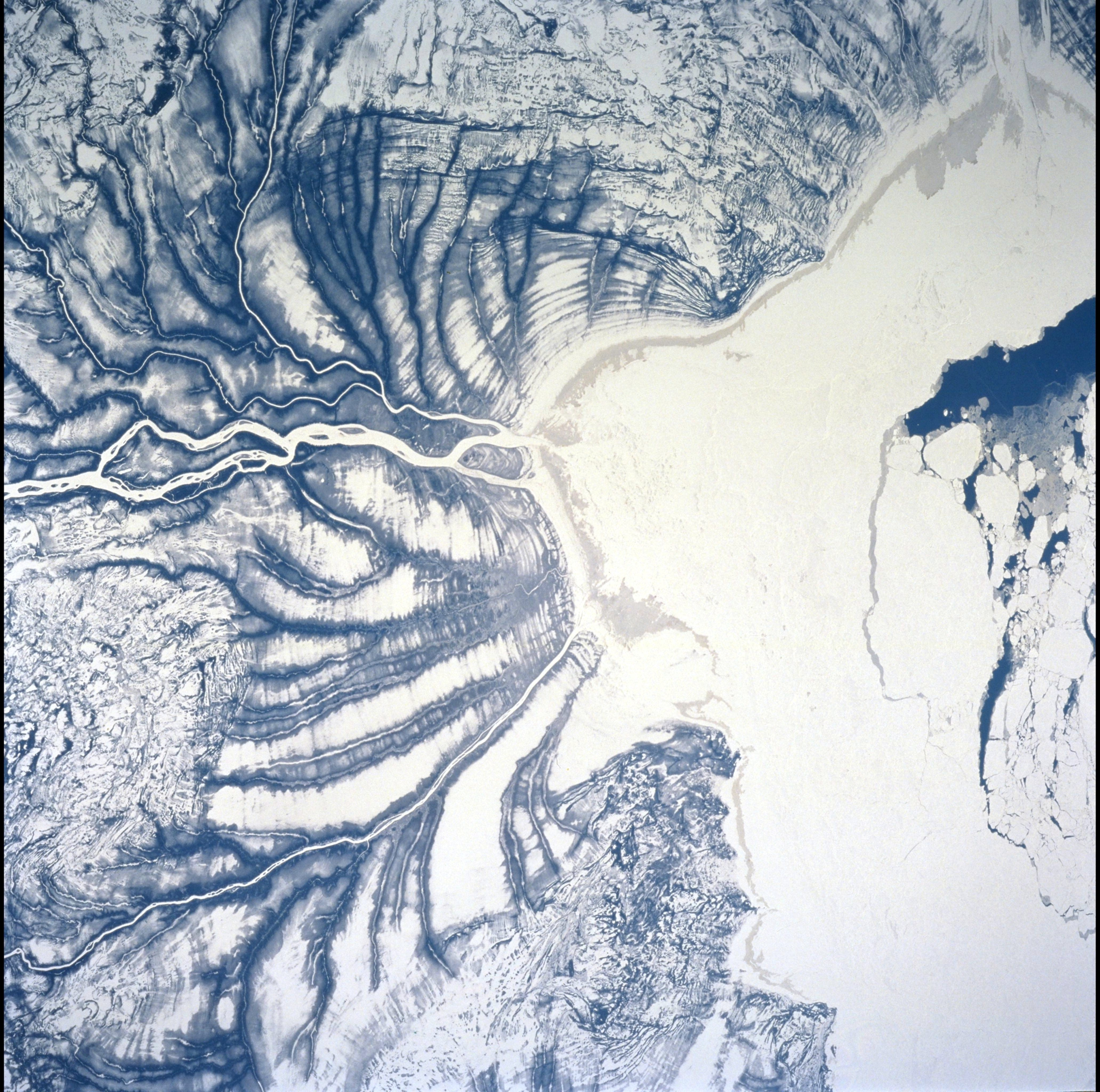
Hannah Bay at the southern end of James Bay

James Bay represents the southern extent of the Arctic Archipelago Marine ecozone. While the coastal areas are primarily in the Hudson Plains, the northeastern coast along Quebec is in the Taiga Shield ecozone. This rocky and hilly eastern shore forms the western edge of the Canadian Shield in Quebec and the main habitat is boreal forest of the Eastern Canadian Shield taiga ecoregion. The western shore in Ontario is characterised by broad tundra lowlands that are an extension of the Hudson Bay Lowlands, and the vegetation is mostly muskeg bog. A large portion of this area is part of the Polar Bear Provincial Park. Ringed seals are common elsewhere along James Bay and are hunted by polar bears. Beluga whales within James Bay basin could be distinct from those found in Hudson Bay.

Hundreds of rivers flow into James Bay, with many characteristics in common. They tend to be wide and shallow near the Bay (in the James Bay Lowlands), whereas they are steeper and narrower farther upstream (as they pour off the Canadian Shield). For a larger list of waterways in the region, see list of Hudson Bay rivers.

=== Hannah Bay ===
Hannah Bay is the southernmost bay of James Bay. Here the Kesagami and Harricana Rivers flow into James Bay. About 238 km^{2} (92 mi^{2}) is protected under the Migratory Birds Convention Act of Canada as the Hannah Bay Bird Sanctuary. This sanctuary has been designated as a Wetland of International Importance under the Ramsar Convention since May 1987.

The shores in this area are a mixture of intertidal mud, sand, and salt flats, estuarine waters, intertidal marshes, freshwater ponds, swamps, and forested peatlands. These elements make an abundance of wildlife.

=== Islands ===
James Bay contains numerous islands; the largest is Akimiski Island, which covers 3,002 square kilometres (1,159 sq mi).

All of northern Ontario and northern Quebec were part of the Hudson Bay Company's proprietary colony of Rupert's Land, and after Rupert's Land was transferred to Canada in 1869, the area became part of the North-West Territories (NWT). In the late 19th and early 20th centuries, the federal government transferred much of the NWT to the central provinces, forming modern Northern Ontario and Northern Quebec. However, all of the islands in Hudson Bay and James Bay remained part of the NWT until its the partition of the NWT in 1999, when the islands were transferred to the new territory of Nunavut.

== Human development ==
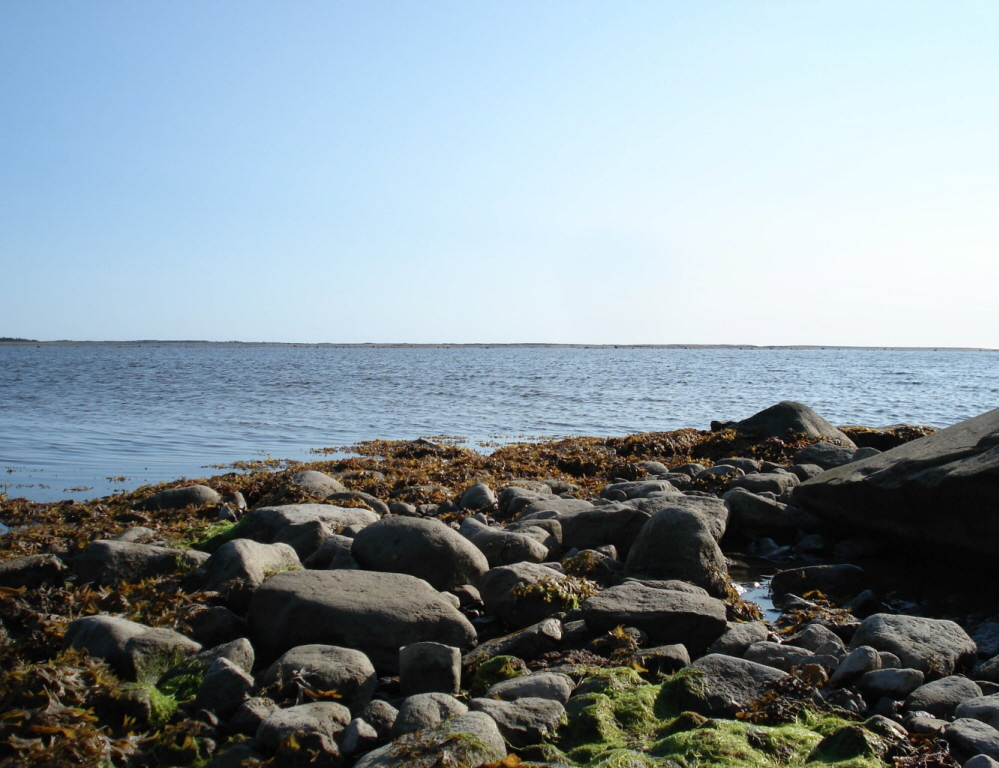
James Bay, near Chisasibi, Quebec

=== Coastal communities ===
The shores of James Bay are sparsely populated. On the eastern shore in Quebec there are four coastal communities belonging to the Cree, the indigenous people of the region (from south to north):

- Waskaganish
- Eastmain
- Wemindji
- Chisasibi

On the western shore in Ontario there are five coastal communities (from south to north):

- Moose Factory
- Moosonee
- Fort Albany
- Kashechewan
- Attawapiskat

=== Economic development ===
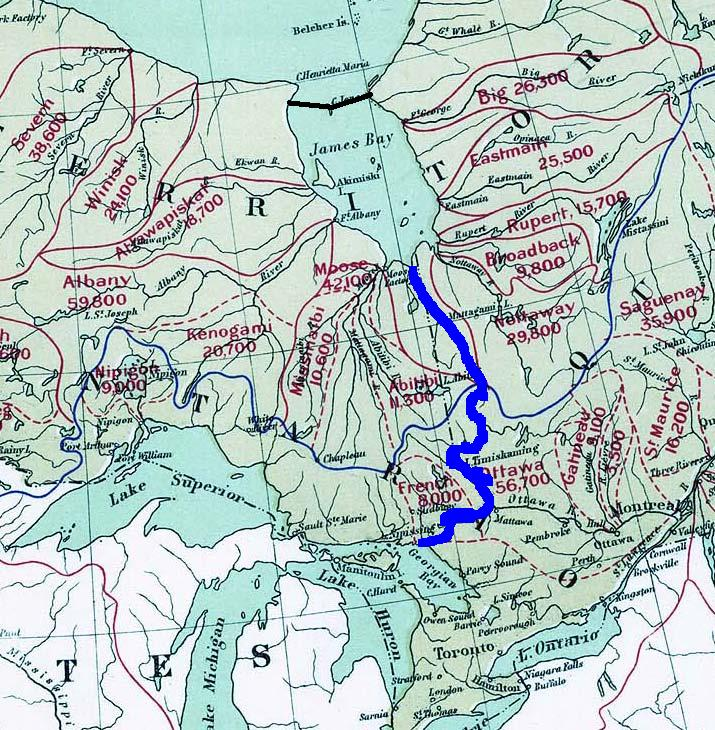
Possible scenario of the GRAND Canal scheme, showing the initial water capture and diversion into Lake Huron.

Since 1971, the government of Quebec has built hydroelectric dams on rivers in the James Bay watershed, notably La Grande and Eastmain rivers. Built between 1974 and 1996, the James Bay Project now has a combined generating capacity of 16,021 MW and produces about 83 billion kWh of electricity each year, about half of Quebec's consumption. Power is also exported to the United States via a direct transmission high voltage line. The James Bay Project continues to expand, with work that began in 2010 on a new phase that involves the diversion of the Rupert River.

A proposed development project, the Great Recycling and Northern Development Canal (GRAND Canal), centred on constructing a large dike to separate southern James Bay from Hudson Bay. This would turn the bay into a freshwater lake, due to the numerous rivers that empty into it. The main benefit expected from this would be to redirect this freshwater for human use. Water would be pumped south from the newly formed James Lake into the Harricana River, crossing into the Great Lakes watershed near Amos, into Lake Timiskaming and the Ottawa River, crossing near Mattawa into Lake Nipissing and the French River to Lake Huron (Georgian Bay).

== Recreation ==
=== Canoeing ===
Many of the rivers flowing into James Bay are popular destinations for wilderness canoe-trippers. Among the more popular rivers are:

- Albany River (Ontario)
- Moose River (Ontario)
- Missinaibi River (Ontario)—recognised as a Canadian Heritage River
- Broadback River (Quebec)
- Rupert River (Quebec)—diverted in 2009 for hydroelectric development and no longer a popular destination

Two less-travelled rivers are the Groundhog River and the Harricana. The Groundhog is less travelled in modern times due to a series of seven dams that are about a day or two up-river from the Moose. Canoeists can contact the dam company and arrange to be portaged around the dams on company trucks, but they must make arrangements specific to the hour, and they cannot be late. The Groundhog flows into the Mattagami. The Mattagami then flows into the Moose; it is at the meeting of the Missinaibi and Mattagami rivers that the Moose river begins, marked by an island known as Portage Island. This point is about two or three days travel by canoe to Moosonee. Though the Missinaibi and the Groundhog are both fairly high in the summer, the Moose is often quite low. Depending on the tides, groups have had to walk long stretches of the river. Rapids on the Groundhog tend to be bigger and more technical than those on the Missinaibi, but the campsites are few and poor, because the volume of travel is so much less.

The Harricana River is a dangerous river that flows into James Bay 40 miles (64 km) east of Moosonee after two infamous sections of river known as 1-mile and 7-mile island. Consistent whitewater and waterfalls make these sections of river extremely dangerous. Anyone wishing to take this route must allow about two days to cross the bay, a dangerous proposition if the tides and the weather are unfavourable.

The most common access point for paddlers to this area is Moosonee, at the southern end of James Bay. A campsite at Tidewater Provincial Park provides large campgrounds with firepits and outhouses on an island across the river from the town. Water taxis will ferry people back and forth for about C$20 each. Many of these rivers finish near Moosonee, and paddlers can take the Polar Bear Express train south to Cochrane at the end of a trip. This train regularly features a 'canoe car' enabling paddlers to travel with their canoes.

Waskaganish, Quebec, is a town farther to the north and east on James Bay. It is accessible via the James Bay Road, and is the most common end point for trips on the Broadback, Pontax, and Rupert rivers (the town itself is situated at the mouth of the Rupert).
