= Webequie First Nation =

Webequie
- Indian reserve
- Webequie Indian Reserve
- Location within Ontario
- Coordinates: 52°57′N 87°22′W
- Country: Canada
- Province: Ontario
- District: Kenora
- First Nation: Webequie

Area
  - Land: 303.41 km^{2} (117.15 sq mi)

Population (2015)
  - Total: 1,300
  - Density: 2/km^{2} (5.2/sq mi)
- Website: www.webequie.ca

Webequie First Nation is located on the northern peninsula of Eastwood Island on Winisk Lake, 540 km (336 mi) north of Thunder Bay in Ontario, Canada. Webequie is a fly-in community with no summer road access. The primary way into the community is by air to Webequie Airport or winter road, which connects to the Northern Ontario Resource Trail. The First Nation have the 34,279 ha Webequie Indian reserve. The Webequie or Webiqui Indian Settlement also have reserve status. Webequie First Nation is a member of the Matawa First Nations, a Regional Chiefs' Council and a member of the Nishnawbe Aski Nation.

The registered population of Webequie was 1,320 persons in September 2015, of which the on-reserve population was over 900. The reserve is entirely surrounded by territory of the Unorganized Kenora District.

Webequie is policed by the Nishnawbe-Aski Police Service, an Aboriginal-based service.

== History ==
When the Treaties were created between the Canadian government and the Aboriginal people of Canada, Webequie was mistakenly listed as part of the community of Fort Hope. They lived under this error until May 1985, when they were recognized as a distinct band. Despite this, the people of Webequie had to fight until February 15, 2001, to achieve full reserve status.

The name "Webequie" comes from the Anishinini word webikwe meaning "shaking head."

The community is profiled in the 2016 short documentary film The Road to Webequie.

In 2017, the provincial government of Ontario pledged support for the construction of a road that would connect Webequie, Nibinamik and the Northern Ontario Ring of Fire to Ontario Highway 599 at Pickle Lake.
