= Wunnumin 1 =

Wunnumin 1 ᐊᐧᓇᒪᐣᓵᑲᐦᐃᑲᓃᕽ
- Indian reserve
- Wunnumin Indian Reserve No. 1
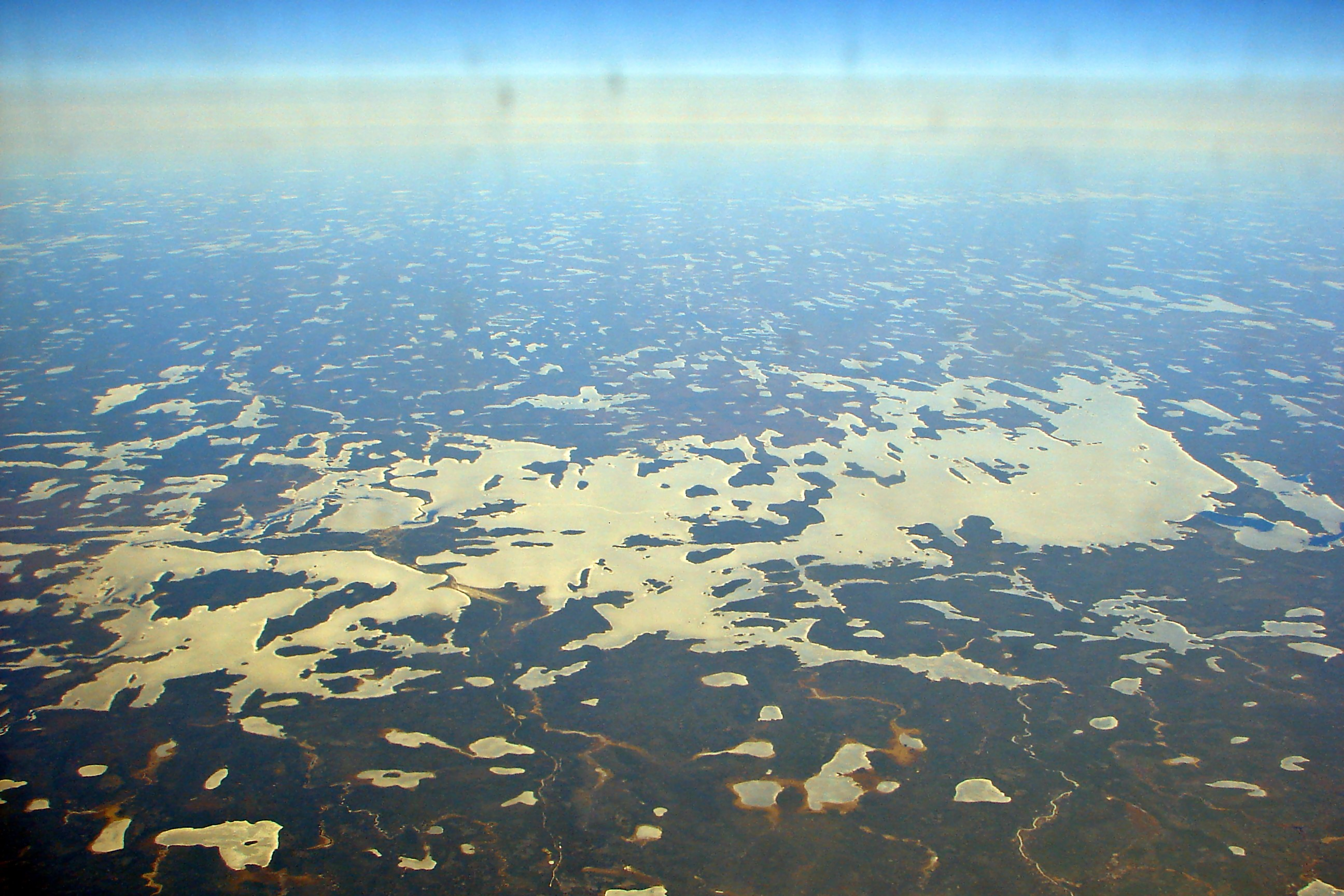
- Wunnummin Lake

- Location within Ontario
- Coordinates: 52°51′N 89°15′W
- Country: Canada
- Province: Ontario
- District: Kenora
- First Nation: Wunnumin Lake

Area
  - Land: 57.71 km^{2} (22.28 sq mi)

Population (2006)
  - Total: 487
  - Density: 8.4/km^{2} (22/sq mi)
- Website: www.wunnumin.ca

Wunnumin 1 is a First Nations reserve in Kenora District, Ontario, Canada. It is one of two reserves of the Wunnumin Lake First Nation.
