= Southern Hudson Bay taiga =

Taiga ecoregion of Canada

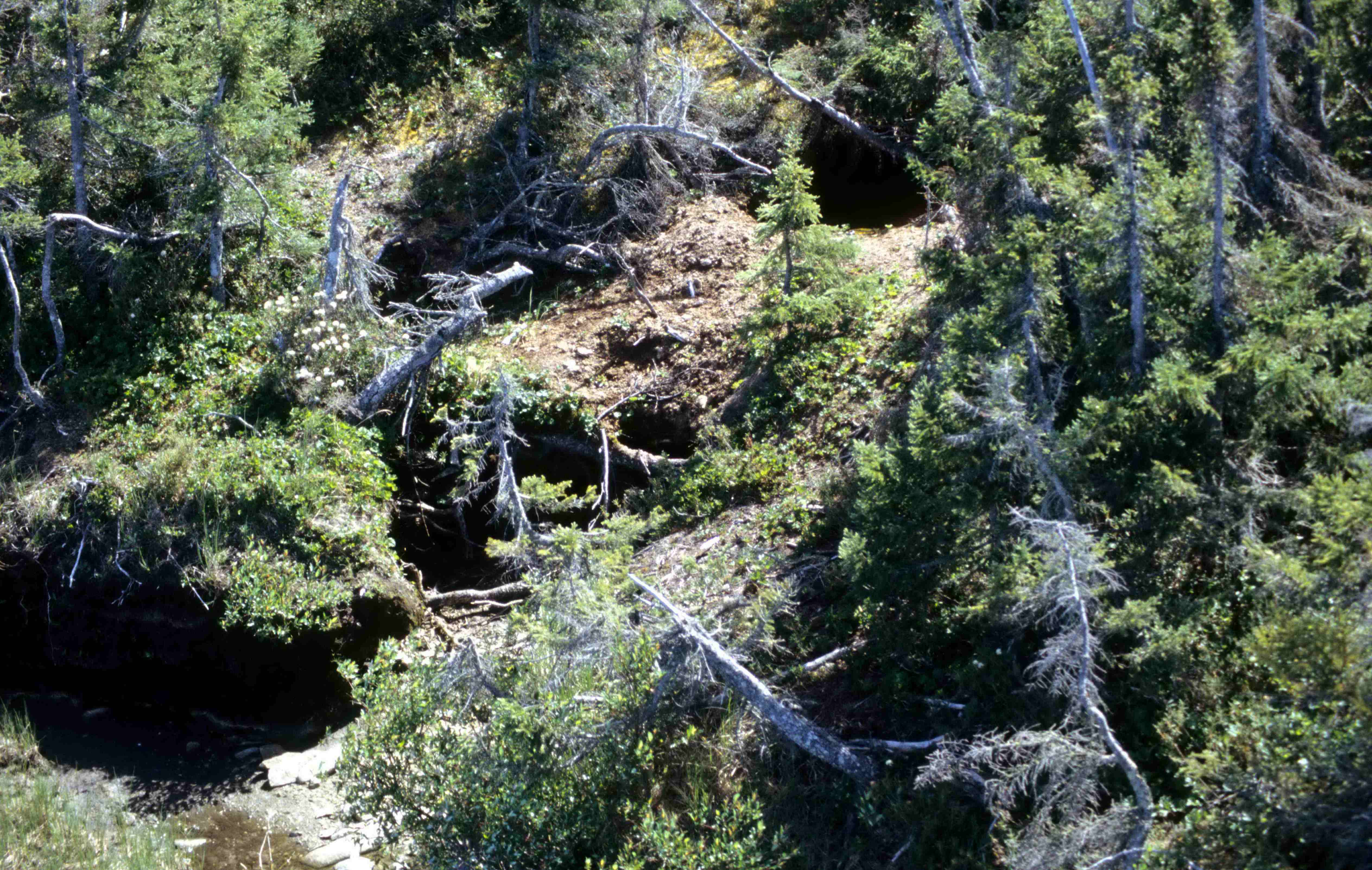
- Black spruce forest in Wapusk National Park, Manitoba. Note the presence of polar bear dens.

- Extent of the Southern Hudson Bay taiga ecoregion

Ecology
- Realm: Nearctic
- Biome: Boreal forests/taiga
- Borders: List: Central Canadian Shield forests; Eastern Canadian Shield taiga; Low Arctic tundra; Midwestern Canadian Shield forests; Northern Canadian Shield taiga
- Bird species: 180
- Mammal species: 45

Geography
- Area: 373,735 km^{2} (144,300 mi^{2})
- Country: Canada
- Province: Ontario; Manitoba; Quebec; Nunavut
- Elevation: 120 m asl
- Coordinates: 53.943°N 85.390°W
- Climate type: Humid continental and subarctic

Conservation
- Conservation status: Relatively Stable/Intact
- Habitat loss: 1%
- Protected: 9.32%

Hudson Plain
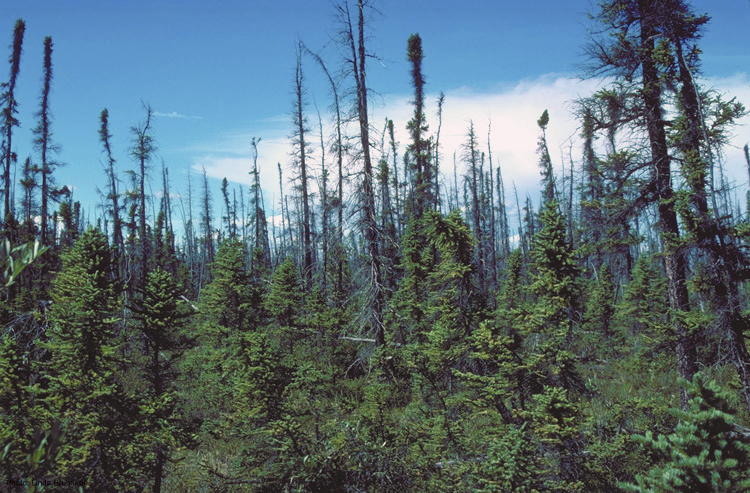
- Black Spruce (Picea mariana) forest typical of this ecozone

Ecology
- Borders: Boreal Shield; Southern Arctic; Taiga Shield

Geography
- Area: 373,718 km^{2} (144,293 mi^{2})
- Country: Canada
- Provinces: Manitoba; Nunavut; Ontario; Quebec
- Climate type: Subarctic

The Southern Hudson Bay taiga is a terrestrial ecoregion, as classified by the World Wildlife Fund, which extends along the southern coast of Hudson Bay and resides within the larger taiga biome. The region is nearly coterminous with the Hudson Plain, a Level I ecoregion of North America as designated by the Commission for Environmental Cooperation (CEC) in its North American Environmental Atlas.

Entirely located in Canada, the Southern Hudson Bay taiga covers an area of approximately 373,735 square kilometres (144,300 sq mi) and crosses the provinces of Manitoba, Ontario, and the western portion of Quebec. Various islands in James Bay which belong to Nunavut are also considered to be part of the ecoregion. It includes the largest continuous wetland in the world. It covers nearly a quarter of Ontario's landmass, and 3.6% of Canada's total area,

Its historical prominence is due to the harshness endured by pioneer explorers who established fortifications for Hudson's Bay Company, and as a result of regional wars between France and Britain. Today, it is primarily noted for the well-known Polar Bear Provincial Park, and to a lesser extent Wapusk National Park, as well as its vast wetlands which are used by migratory birds.

== Geography ==
The Southern Hudson Bay taiga is contained within the conceptually larger Nearctic realm and possesses a number of neighbouring ecoregions including the Eastern Canadian Shield taiga, Northern Canadian Shield taiga, Central Canadian Shield forests, and Midwestern Canadian Shield forests. Prominent geological features in the region include the Hudson Platform and an underlying layer of Paleozoic limestone bedrock. Its soils, which are primarily Gelic and Dystric Histosols and Eutric Gleysols, are characterized by shallow layers of permafrost, slightly acidic pH levels, and hydromorphic conditions. The Southern Hudson Bay taiga represents an area where a number of hydrologically significant rivers, such as the Nelson River and the Mattagami River, deposit their headwaters from farther inland into the Arctic Ocean via Hudson Bay. Alternative geographic classifications also commonly refer to the region as the Hudson Bay Lowlands.

The Palaeozoic and Proterozoic sedimentary deposits overlaying the bedrock have formed into a wide and level plain characterised by raised beaches and river deltas, with an elevation rarely exceeding 120 m. The relatively flat land slopes gently toward the two bays, which act as a drainage basin for the region. However, the relatively poor drainage system has spurred the natural development of numerous wetlands. It is encircled by the Canadian Shield, with which it overlaps in a few areas to the east and west.

To its north is the cold Arctic Archipelago Marine ecozone, and to the south is the milder Boreal Shield. Hence, this ecozone is transitional, which is easily evident as it transforms from barren tundra in the north to open taiga forests in the south. These forests resemble those of the boreal zone, with sparser vegetation.

Thousands of depressions carved by retreating glaciers have become lakes and wetlands. The Hudson Plains is also noted for coastal marshes and extensive tidal flats, with tidal marshes along the coast of Hudson Bay. Belts of raised beaches are evident where rebound from glacier retreat is most prominent.

== Climate ==
The ecoregion has a subarctic climate under the Köppen-Geiger climate classification system and is significantly influenced by the adjacent marine area of Hudson Bay, which features cold and moisture-laden low-pressure systems. Typical seasonal conditions in the Southern Hudson Bay taiga consist of brief, cool summers with significant daylight, and cold winters with prolonged darkness. Frigid polar high-pressure air masses commonly reach the area. Average temperatures range from 10.5°C to 11.5°C during summer months, -19°C to -16°C during winter months, and -5°C to -2°C throughout the year. Precipitation levels vary greatly within the region due to differences in temperature, with the eastern and western areas receiving an annual average of 500-800 mm and the northern areas as little as 400 mm.

== Flora and fauna ==
Referred to as an "insect-infested landscape of bog and fog", it teems with large insect populations that are a food source for migratory waterbirds. The Hudson Plains have become "notorious for their populations of biting insects". Vegetation is somewhat limited, with the northern areas abutting the Arctic Archipelago Marine being nearly treeless, whereas the southern extent, adjacent to the Boreal Shield, have open forest. Alder, willow, black spruce and tamarack are the most common plant species in the treed bogs and fens of the Hudson Plains, whereas sphagnum and shrubs such as crowberry and blueberry dominate the open bogs to the north, with white spruce appearing further south. Poorly drained areas produce dense sedge, moss and lichen cover.

The Hudson Plains also represent the southern extent of the polar bears yearly migratory route, which reaches the northwestern coast of Ontario. In autumn, polar bears migrate to the ice pack forming along the coast of Hudson Bay. The bears then follow the Hudson Bay Coast toward Churchill, Manitoba. Mammals such as moose, woodland caribou and black bears are comfortable in this environment, but smaller mammals are more common, including muskrats, weasels, Arctic foxes, martens, and fishers.

The adjacent marine ecozone of the Arctic Archipelago Marine supports mammal populations of walrus and bearded, harbour and ringed seals.

Millions of migratory shorebirds stage and nest in multiple areas of the Hudson Plains, particularly in three areas within Southern James Bay: Akimiski Island, and the migratory bird sanctuaries at Hannah Bay and the mouth of the Moose River. Representative species include the snow goose, Canada goose, king eider, swan, loon, gyrfalcon, and peregrine falcon.

Belonging to the circumboreal floristic region, the Southern Hudson Bay taiga contains a total of 1178 different plant species – none of which are considered endemic to the area. The major plant communities in this ecoregion, which are characteristic of the taiga biome, primarily consist of black spruce (Picea mariana) and tamarack (Larix laricina) forests. Species which commonly dominate the forest undergrowth are birch (Betula), willow (Salix), and marsh Labrador tea (Rhododendron tomentosum). Due to the tundra conditions in the northern extent of the region, a latitudinal gradient of plant biodiversity exists which increases towards the south. Wetlands in this ecoregion are estimated to occupy between 50 and 75% of the land area.

In terms of species composition, the animal populations of the Southern Hudson Bay taiga are largely transitional between those of the Central Canadian Shield forests and Low Arctic tundra. The region contains a total of 45 mammal species, 160 bird species, and 2 reptile species. The coastal areas of southern Hudson Bay are home to polar bears (Ursus marinus), arctic foxes (Vulpes lagopus), seals (Phocidae), beluga whales (Delphinapterus leucas), and tundra swans (Cygnus columbianus). Approaching the Central Canadian Shield forests near James Bay, the ecoregion gives way to moose (Alces), black bears (Ursus americanus), wolves (Canis lupus), and Canada lynx (Lynx canadensis). Other species which can be found throughout the entirety of the ecoregion are caribou (Rangifer tarandus), snowshoe hare (Lepus americanus), and Canada goose (Branta canadensis).

== Human use ==
With an average population density estimated at less than 1 person/km^{2}, the majority of the human population in the Southern Hudson Bay taiga is concentrated in a number of smaller towns and communities located along the southern coast of Hudson Bay. These include Churchill, Moosonee, and Moose Factory as well as the First Nation communities of Fort Severn, Fort Albany, and Attawapiskat. Much of the ecoregion is the traditional territory of the Cree, Dene, Inuit, and Métis peoples. The region also witnessed the development of the Hudson's Bay Company during the 17th century and played an integral role in the North American fur trade. It was part of a larger area referred to as Rupert's Land in which the Hudson's Bay Company had exclusive commercial rights until it was sold to the Canadian government in 1870.

== Conservation and threats ==
The World Wildlife Fund has classified the conservation status of the ecoregion as relatively stable/intact as a result of its sparse, low-impact human presence. It is therefore not part of the WWF's Global 200 list of ecoregions most in need of conservation efforts. Approximately 9.32% of all lands in the Southern Hudson Bay taiga are considered protected including Polar Bear Provincial Park, Wapusk National Park, and Jog Lake Conservation Reserve. As a result of its more northern latitude, the area is not subject to intense logging or deforestation pressures. The primary conservation concerns for the region surround the proposed hydroelectric projects near James Bay and the regulation of hunt camps. Estimates indicate that the Southern Hudson Bay taiga will experience an increase in temperature of 3.39°C and an increase in precipitation of 13.32 mm by 2050 as a result of climate change.

== See also ==
- List of ecoregions in Canada (WWF)
