= Winisk Lake =

Lake in Kenora District, Ontario, Canada

- lac Winisk
- Location of Winisk Lake in Ontario
- Location: Kenora District, Canada
- Coordinates: 52°54′35″N 87°23′03″W
- Part of: Hudson Bay drainage basin
- Primary inflows: Winisk River; Fishbasket River; Wapitotem River
- Primary outflows: Winisk River
- Max. length: 35 km (22 mi)
- Max. width: 19 km (12 mi)
- Surface elevation: 193 m (633 ft)
- Settlements: Webequie First Nation

Winisk Lake (French: lac Winisk) is a large, irregularly-shaped lake in the Unorganized Part of Kenora District in northwestern Ontario, Canada. It is on the Winisk River, and is part of the Hudson Bay drainage basin.

The lake is about 35 kilometres (22 mi) long and 19 kilometres (12 mi) wide and lies at an elevation of 193 metres (633 ft). The primary inflows are the Winisk River at the northeast, the Wapitotem River at the south and the Fishbasket River at the southwest. The primary outflow is the Winisk River at the north, which flows to Hudson Bay.

The Webequie First Nation (also known as Webequie, Ontario) and its airport are located on Eastwood Island in the middle of the lake.

== See also ==
- List of lakes in Ontario
