= Winisk River =

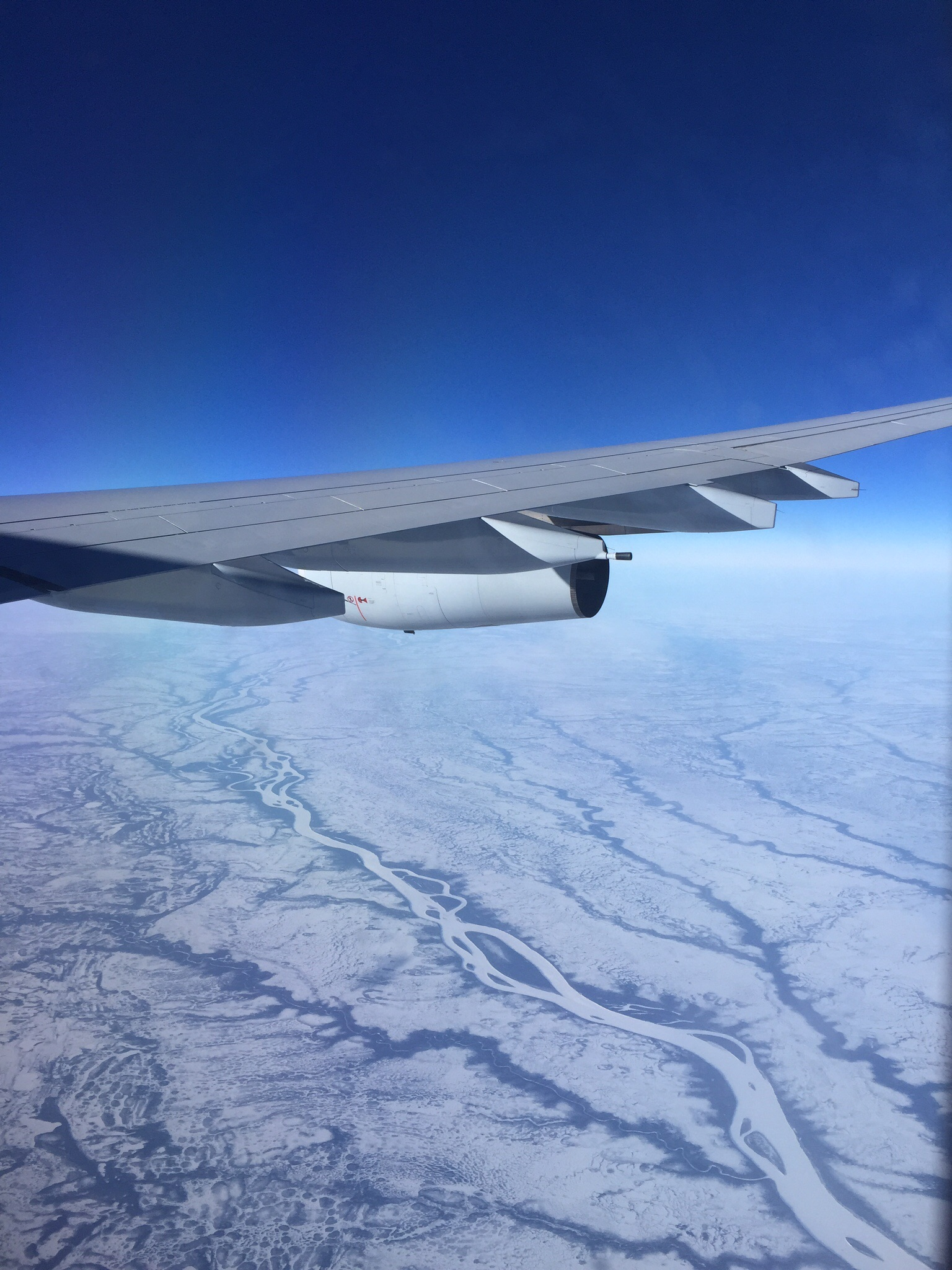

- Location within Ontario
- Etymology: groundhog river
- Native name: Winassko Sipi (Swampy Cree)

Location
- Country: Canada
- Province: Ontario
- District: Kenora

Physical characteristics
- Source
  - elevation: 242 m (794 ft)
- Mouth: Hudson Bay
  - coordinates: 55°16′30″N 85°5′30″W
  - elevation: 0 m (0 ft)
- Length: 475 km (295 mi)
- Basin size: 67,300 km^{2} (26,000 sq mi)

The Winisk River is a river in northern Ontario, Canada, that starts at Wunnummin Lake and flows east to Winisk Lake. From there it continues in a mostly northerly direction to Hudson Bay. The Winisk River is 475 kilometres (295 mi) long and has a drainage basin of 67,300 square kilometres (26,000 sq mi). The name is from Swampy Cree Winassko sipi meaning "groundhog river."^{:52}

The river is remote and not accessible by road. Only a few isolated communities are along the river: Wunnumin Lake First Nation (on same lake), Webequie (on Winisk Lake) and Peawanuck, about 30 kilometres (19 mi) from its end. It is characterized by strong currents and whitewater while flowing off the Canadian Shield into the Hudson Bay lowlands. Here the river becomes broad.

== Tributaries ==
- Pipestone River
- Asheweig River
- Shamattawa River

== Provincial Park ==
Winisk River Provincial Park
- IUCN category II (national park)
- Interactive map of Winisk River Provincial Park
- Location: Ontario, Canada
- Nearest town: Peawanuck
- Area: 1,411 km^{2} (545 sq mi)
- Established: 1969
- Governing body: Ontario Parks

For most of the length of the Winisk River and its banks, from Winisk Lake to the Polar Bear Provincial Park, has been designated a provincial waterway park.

It is a non-operating park, meaning no fees are charged and no visitor facilities or services are present. Visitors must be experienced in travelling through isolated wilderness and skilled in handling whitewater.

== See also ==
- List of rivers of Ontario
