= Pipestone River (Kenora District) =

- Location within Ontario

Location
- Country: Canada
- Province: Ontario
- District: Kenora

Physical characteristics
- Mouth
  - location: Wunnummin Lake
  - coordinates: 52°53′20″N 89°23′18″W
  - elevation: 242 m (794 ft)

Basin features
- Progression: Pipestone→ Winisk→ Hudson Bay

The Pipestone River is a river in northwestern Ontario, Canada. It is a major tributary of Winisk River via Wunnummin Lake. This pristine river flows through the rugged wilderness of Ontario's northern boreal forest, and drains into Wunnummin Lake.

The river has extensive whitewater sections, including 37 sets of rapids ranging from Class 1 to 5+. The portion of the river from Nord Road (formerly Highway 808) to its mouth is protected in the Pipestone River Provincial Park. Because of its remoteness and lack of facilities and services, canoeists require well-skilled wilderness and whitewater experience.

At Misamikwash Lake (formerly known as Big Beaver Lake), the Hudson's Bay Company operated a fur trading post and outpost called Big Beaver House, that operated from 1911 to 1965. It was established by William King Oman as an outpost in 1911 and became a full trading post in 1945. In 1948, a store and warehouse were built. It closed in 1965 and moved its business to Wunnummin Lake.

== Geography ==
Significant tributaries of the Pipestone River are (in upstream order):

- Wachusk River
- Paseminon River
- Morris River
- North Pipestone River

Significant lakes along its course include (in upstream order):

- Hilyard Lake
- Misamikwash Lake
- Horseshoe Lake
- Kecheokagan Lake

The Frog Rapids (52°12′05″N 90°47′30″W) are just upstream of where the Pipestone River flows into Horseshoe Lake. The 2 km (1.2 mi) Frog Portage, whose upstream endpoint is located about 7.8 km (4.8 mi) by water above the rapids on Kecheokagan Lake, allows canoeists to bypass the rapids. This segment of the Pipestone River is not part of Pipestone River Provincial Park.
