= List of airports in Canada =

Due to the size of the list it has been broken down into the following:
- List of airports in Canada (A-B)
- List of airports in Canada (C-D)
- List of airports in Canada (E-G)
- List of airports in Canada (H-K)
- List of airports in Canada (L-M)
- List of airports in Canada (N-Q)
- List of airports in Canada (R-S)
- List of airports in Canada (T-Z)

== See also ==
- Transport in Canada
- Wikipedia:WikiProject Aviation/Airline destination lists: North America#Canada
