= List of Canadian airports by location indicator: CE =

This is a list of all Nav Canada certified and registered water and land airports, aerodromes and heliports in the provinces and territories of Canada sorted by location identifier.

They are listed in the format:

- Location indicator – IATA – Airport name (alternate name) – Airport location

== CE – Canada – CAN ==
Also see airport category and list.

TC LID	IATA	Airport name	Community	Province or territory
CEA3		Olds-Didsbury Airport	Olds	Alberta
CEA5		Hardisty Airport	Hardisty	Alberta
CEA6		Cardston Airport	Cardston	Alberta
CEB4		Rockyford/Early Bird Air Aerodrome	Rockyford	Alberta
CEB5		Fairview Airport	Fairview	Alberta
CEB7		Carcross Water Aerodrome	Carcross	Yukon
CEB8		Essex/Billing Airstrip	Essex	Ontario
CEB9		Lutselk'e Water Aerodrome	Łutselk'e	Northwest Territories
CEC3		Fox Lake Airport	Fox Lake	Alberta
CEC4		Hinton/Jasper-Hinton Airport	Hinton	Alberta
CEC5		Fort Smith (District) Heliport	Fort Smith	Northwest Territories
CED3		Oyen Municipal Airport	Oyen	Alberta
CED4		Fox Creek Airport	Fox Creek	Alberta
CED5		Taber Airport	Taber	Alberta
CED6		De Winton (Highwood) Heliport	De Winton	Alberta
CED7		Colville Lake Water Aerodrome	Colville Lake	Northwest Territories
CED8		Thunder Bay/Eldorado Aerodrome	Thunder Bay	Ontario
CED9		Taltheilei Narrows Water Aerodrome	Great Slave Lake	Northwest Territories
CEE2		Calgary/Elephant Enterprises Inc. Heliport	Calgary	Alberta
CEE3		Inuvik/Shell Lake Water Aerodrome	Inuvik	Northwest Territories
CEE4		Hinton/Entrance Airport	Hinton	Alberta
CEE5		Wabasca Airport	Wabasca	Alberta
CEE6		Edmonton/Twin Island Airpark	Half Moon Lake	Alberta
CEE7		Edmonton/Cooking Lake Water Aerodrome	South Cooking Lake	Alberta
CEE8		Viking Airport	Viking	Alberta
CEF3		Bow Island Aerodrome	Bow Island	Alberta
CEF4		Airdrie Aerodrome	Airdrie	Alberta
CEF8		Hay River Water Aerodrome	Hay River	Northwest Territories
CEF9		Tincup Lake Water Aerodrome	Tincup Wilderness Lodge	Yukon
CEG3		Lacombe Regional Airport	Lacombe	Alberta
CEG4		Drumheller Municipal Airport	Drumheller	Alberta
CEG5		Chipewyan Lake Airport	Chipewyan Lake	Alberta
CEG6		Nordegg/Ahlstrom Heliport	Nordegg	Alberta
CEG8		North Seal River Airport	North Seal River	Manitoba
CEG9		Sambaa K'e Water Aerodrome	Sambaa K'e	Northwest Territories
CEH2		Black Diamond/Cu Nim Airport	Black Diamond	Alberta
CEH3		Ponoka (Labrie Field) Airport	Ponoka	Alberta
CEH4		De Winton/South Calgary Airport (RAF Station De Winton)	De Winton	Alberta
CEH5		Red Earth Creek Airport	Red Earth Creek	Alberta
CEH6		Provost Airport	Provost	Alberta
CEH7		Elkford Heliport	Elkford	British Columbia
CEH9		Truro (Colchester Health Centre) Heliport	Truro	Nova Scotia
CEJ3		Stettler Airport	Stettler	Alberta
CEJ4		Claresholm Industrial Airport (RCAF Station Claresholm)	Claresholm	Alberta
CEJ6		Elk Point Airport	Elk Point	Alberta
CEJ9		Watson Lake Water Aerodrome	Watson Lake	Yukon
CEK2		Braeburn Airport (Cinnamon Bun Airstrip)	Braeburn Lodge	Yukon
CEK6		Killam-Sedgewick/Flagstaff Regional Airport	Killam	Alberta
CEL3		East Linton (Kerr Field) Aerodrome	East Linton	Ontario
CEL4		Hanna Airport	Hanna	Alberta
CEL5		Valleyview Airport	Valleyview	Alberta
CEL6		Two Hills Airport	Two Hills	Alberta
CEL7		Ford Bay Water Aerodrome	Ford Bay, Great Bear Lake	Northwest Territories
CEL8		Éléonore Aerodrome	Opinaca Reservoir	Quebec
CEL9		Calgary/Eastlake Heliport	Calgary	Alberta
CEM2		Calgary (Rockyview Hospital) Heliport	Calgary	Alberta
CEM3		Whatì Airport	Whatì	Northwest Territories
CEM4		Innisfail/Big Bend Aerodrome (Big Bend Airport)	Innisfail	Alberta
CEM5		Swan Hills Airport	Swan Hills	Alberta
CEN2		Bassano Airport	Bassano	Alberta
CEN3		Three Hills Airport	Three Hills	Alberta
CEN4		Foothills Regional Aerodrome	High River	Alberta
CEN5		Cold Lake Regional Airport	Cold Lake	Alberta
CEN6		Vauxhall Airport	Vauxhall	Alberta
CEN7		Déline Water Aerodrome	Délı̨nę	Northwest Territories
CEN9		Yellowknife Water Aerodrome	Yellowknife	Northwest Territories
CEP2		Calgary (Bow Crow) Heliport	Calgary	Alberta
CEP3		Barrhead Airport	Barrhead	Alberta
CEP4		Coutts/Ross International Airport	Coutts	Alberta
CEP5		Janvier Airport	Janvier	Alberta
CEP6		Warner Airport	Warner	Alberta
CEP7		Elk Point (Healthcare Centre) Heliport	Elk Point	Alberta
CEP8		Edmonton/Eastport Heliport	Sherwood Park	Alberta
CEP9		Namushka Lodge Water Aerodrome	Namushka Lodge (Harding Lake)	Northwest Territories
CEQ3		Camrose Airport	Camrose	Alberta
CEQ4		Del Bonita/Whetstone International Airport	Del Bonita	Alberta
CEQ8		Whatì Water Aerodrome	Whatì	Northwest Territories
CER2		Castor Airport	Castor	Alberta
CER3		Drayton Valley Industrial Airport	Drayton Valley	Alberta
CER6		Aklavik Water Aerodrome	Aklavik	Northwest Territories
CER9		Fort Nelson (Parker Lake) Water Aerodrome	Fort Nelson	British Columbia
CES2		Saint-Esprit Aerodrome	Saint-Esprit	Quebec
CES3		Edmonton/St. Albert (Delta Helicopters) Heliport	St. Albert	Alberta
CES4		Westlock Airport	Westlock	Alberta
CES5		Centralia (Essery Field) Aerodrome	Centralia	Ontario
CES7		Fort McMurray Water Aerodrome	Fort McMurray	Alberta
CES8		Edmonton/Grey Nuns Community Hospital Heliport	Edmonton	Alberta
CES9		Great Bear Lake Water Aerodrome	Great Bear Lake	Northwest Territories
CET2		Conklin (Leismer) Airport	Conklin	Alberta
CET4		Fort Simpson Island Airport	Fort Simpson	Northwest Territories
CET5		Hay River (District) Heliport	Hay River	Northwest Territories
CET9		Jean Marie River Airport	Jean Marie River	Northwest Territories
CEU2		Beaverlodge Airport	Beaverlodge	Alberta
CEU4		Rocky Mountain House (Health Centre) Heliport	Rocky Mountain House	Alberta
CEU8		Norman Wells Water Aerodrome	Norman Wells	Northwest Territories
CEU9		Sambaa K'e Aerodrome	Sambaa K'e	Northwest Territories
CEV2		Edra Airport	Edra	Alberta
CEV3		Vegreville Airport	Vegreville	Alberta
CEV5		Mayerthorpe Airport	Mayerthorpe	Alberta
CEV7		Tofield Airport	Tofield	Alberta
CEV9		Snare River Airport	Snare River	Northwest Territories
CEW2		Elstow/Combine World Field Aerodrome	Elstow	Saskatchewan
CEW3		St. Paul Aerodrome	St. Paul	Alberta
CEW5		Milk River Airport	Milk River	Alberta
CEW7		Edmonton/University of Alberta (Stollery Children's Hospital) Heliport	Edmonton	Alberta
CEW8		Paulatuk Water Aerodrome	Paulatuk	Northwest Territories
CEW9		Canmore Municipal Heliport	Canmore	Alberta
CEX3		Wetaskiwin Regional Airport	Wetaskiwin	Alberta
CEX4		Carmacks Airport	Carmacks	Yukon
CEX9		Brant (Dixon Farm) Airport	Brant	Alberta
CEY3		Fort Macleod Airport (RCAF Station Fort Macleod)	Fort Macleod	Alberta
CEZ2		Chapman Aerodrome	Chapman Lake	Yukon
CEZ3		Edmonton/Cooking Lake Airport	South Cooking Lake	Alberta
CEZ4		Fort Vermilion (Wop May Memorial) Aerodrome	Fort Vermilion	Alberta
CEZ5		Whitehorse Water Aerodrome	Whitehorse (Schwatka Lake)	Yukon
CEZ7		Fort Simpson Island Water Aerodrome	Fort Simpson	Northwest Territories
