= Limberlost =

Limberlost may refer to:

- Limberlost (novel), a 2022 novel by Robbie Arnott
- Limberlost Swamp, in the U.S. state of Indiana
- Limberlost Forest and Wildlife Reserve, near Huntsville, Ontario, Canada
- Limberlost Place, a project currently under construction in Toronto, Canada
