= List of airports in Canada (H–K) =

This is an list of all Nav Canada certified and registered water and land airports, aerodromes and heliports in the provinces and territories of Canada. The list is sorted alphabetically as shown in the Canada Flight Supplement (and the name as used by the airport if different) and airports names in italics are part of the National Airports System.

They are listed in the format:

- Airport name as listed by either the Canada Flight Supplement (CFS) or the airport authority, alternate name, International Civil Aviation Organization (ICAO) code, Transport Canada Location identifier (TC LID) International Air Transport Association (IATA) code, community and province.

== H ==
Airport name	ICAO	TC LID	IATA	Community	Province or territory
Hafford Airport		CJC6		Hafford	Saskatchewan
Hagersville (West Haldimand General Hospital) Heliport		CPA6		Hagersville	Ontario
Haines Junction Airport	CYHT		YHT	Haines Junction	Yukon
Haliburton (Hospital) Heliport		CNF2		Haliburton	Ontario
Haliburton/Stanhope Municipal Airport		CND4		Haliburton	Ontario
Halifax (IWK Health Centre) Heliport		CIW2		Halifax	Nova Scotia
Halifax (QE II Health Sciences Centre) Heliport		CHQE		Halifax	Nova Scotia
Halifax/Shearwater Heliport (Shearwater Heliport, CFB Shearwater)	CYAW		YAW	Shearwater	Nova Scotia
Halifax (South End) Heliport		CHS7		Halifax	Nova Scotia
Halifax Stanfield International Airport	CYHZ		YHZ	Halifax	Nova Scotia
Halkirk/Paintearth (Fetaz) Aerodrome		CPE8		Halkirk	Alberta
Hamilton (General Hospital) Heliport		CPK3		Hamilton	Ontario
Hamilton/John C. Munro International Airport (John C. Munro Hamilton International Airport	CYHM		YHM	Hamilton	Ontario
Hamilton (McMaster University Medical Centre) Heliport		CPJ3		Hamilton	Ontario
Hamilton/Waterdown Heliport		CWD3		Waterdown	Ontario
Hanna Airport		CEL4		Hanna	Alberta
Hanna (Health Centre) Heliport		CHD3		Hanna	Alberta
Hanover (District Hospital) Heliport		CNZ7		Hanover	Ontario
Harbour Grace Airport		CHG2		Harbour Grace	Newfoundland and Labrador
Hardisty Airport		CEA5		Hardisty	Alberta
Hardisty (Health Centre) Heliport		CHD2		Hardisty	Alberta
Harrington Harbour Heliport		CTH5		Harrington Harbour	Quebec
Harrison Hot Springs Water Aerodrome		CAE7		Harrison Hot Springs	British Columbia
Harrow Airport		CGL2		Harrow	Ontario
Hartley Bay Water Aerodrome		CAY4	YTB	Hartley Bay	British Columbia
Hastings/Sweetwater Farms Aerodrome		CSW6		Hastings	Ontario
Hatchet Lake Airport		CJL2		Hatchet Lake	Saskatchewan
Hatchet Lake Water Aerodrome		CJX8		Hatchet Lake	Saskatchewan
Havelock Airport		CCS5		Havelock	New Brunswick
Havre Saint-Pierre Airport	CYGV		YGV	Havre-Saint-Pierre	Quebec
Havre Saint-Pierre Water Aerodrome		CTE3		Havre-Saint-Pierre	Quebec
Hawkesbury Airport		CNV4		Hawkesbury	Ontario
Hawkesbury (East) Airport		CPG5		Hawkesbury	Ontario
Hawk Junction Water Aerodrome		CNH6		Hawk Junction	Ontario
Hayes Camp Aerodrome		CHC5		Sandspit Lake	Nunavut
Hay River (District) Heliport		CET5		Hay River	Northwest Territories
Hay River/Merlyn Carter Airport	CYHY		YHY	Hay River	Northwest Territories
Hay River Water Aerodrome		CEF8		Hay River	Northwest Territories
Head Lake Water Aerodrome		CPV5		Head Lake	Ontario
Hearst/Carey Lake Water Aerodrome		CNJ5		Hearst	Ontario
Hearst (René Fontaine) Municipal Airport	CYHF		YHF	Hearst	Ontario
Heathcote/Wilkinson Field Aerodrome		CWF4		Heathcote	Ontario
Helmet Airport		CBH2		Helmet	British Columbia
Henderson/Big Gull Lake Water Aerodrome		CBG6		Henderson (Big Gull Lake)	Ontario
Hespero Airport		CFB3		Hespero	Alberta
Hespero/Safron Residence Heliport		CTS6		Hespero	Alberta
Highgate Airport		CNA2		Highgate	Ontario
High Level Airport	CYOJ		YOJ	High Level	Alberta
High Level (Monashee Helicopters) Heliport		CHL5		High Level	Alberta
High Prairie Airport	CZHP			High Prairie	Alberta
High River (Hospital) Heliport		CHR2		High River	Alberta
Hillaton/Kings Aerodrome		CHL2		Hillaton	Nova Scotia
Hillspring (Beck Farm) Aerodrome		CHS3		Hill Spring	Alberta
Hinton/Entrance Airport		CEE4		Hinton	Alberta
Hinton/Jasper-Hinton Airport		CEC4		Hinton	Alberta
Holland Landing Airpark		CLA4		Holland Landing	Ontario
Homewood Airport		CJT8		Homewood	Manitoba
Hoopers Lake Water Aerodrome		CDT2		Hoopers Lake	Nova Scotia
Hope Aerodrome	CYHE		YHE	Hope	British Columbia
Hope Bay Aerodrome		CHB3	UZM	Hope Bay	Nunavut
Hopedale Airport	CYHO		YHO	Hopedale	Newfoundland and Labrador
Hornepayne Municipal Airport	CYHN		YHN	Hornepayne	Ontario
Hornepayne Water Aerodrome		CNJ6		Hornepayne	Ontario
Houston Aerodrome		CAM5		Houston	British Columbia
Hudson's Hope Airport	CYNH		YNH	Hudson's Hope	British Columbia
Hudson Bay Airport	CYHB		YHB	Hudson Bay	Saskatchewan
Hudson Water Aerodrome		CJA9		Hudson	Ontario
Huggett/Goodwood Field Aerodrome		CGF5		Huggett	Alberta
Humboldt Airport		CJU4		Humboldt	Saskatchewan
Huntsville/Bella Lake Water Aerodrome		CPY7		Huntsville	Ontario
Huntsville/Grassmere S.D.W. Memorial Water Aerodrome		CHN2		Huntsville	Ontario
Huntsville (Memorial District Hospital) Heliport		CPC9		Huntsville	Ontario
Huntsville (North) Water Aerodrome		CHL6		Huntsville	Ontario
Huntsville Water Aerodrome		CNU6		Huntsville	Ontario
Hyland Airport		CFT5		Hyland	Yukon

== I ==
Airport name	ICAO	TC LID	IATA	Community	Province or territory
Igloolik Airport	CYGT		YGT	Igloolik	Nunavut
Ignace (MBCHC) Heliport		CJN3		Ignace	Ontario
Ignace Municipal Airport	CZUC		ZUC	Ignace	Ontario
Ignace Water Aerodrome		CJD9		Ignace	Ontario
Île-à-la-Crosse Airport		CJF3		Île-à-la-Crosse	Saskatchewan
Île aux Coudres Airport		CTA3		L'Isle-aux-Coudres	Quebec
Îles aux Oies Heliport		CIO2		Île aux Oies	Quebec
Îles-de-la-Madeleine Airport	CYGR		YGR	Magdalen Islands	Quebec
Ilford Airport	CZBD		ILF	Ilford	Manitoba
Indus/Winters Aire Park Airport		CFY4		Indus	Alberta
Ingenika Airport		CAP6		Ingenika	British Columbia
Innerkip Aerodrome		CNR2		Innerkip	Ontario
Innisfail/Big Bend Aerodrome (Big Bend Airport)		CEM4		Innisfail	Alberta
Innisfail (Hospital) Heliport		CSF2		Innisfail	Alberta
Inukjuak Airport	CYPH		YPH	Inukjuak	Quebec
Inuvik (Mike Zubko) Airport	CYEV		YEV	Inuvik	Northwest Territories
Inuvik/Shell Lake Water Aerodrome		CEE3		Inuvik	Northwest Territories
Invermere Airport		CAA8		Invermere	British Columbia
Invermere (District Hospital) Heliport		CIV2		Invermere	British Columbia
Inverness (Consolidated Memorial Hospital) Heliport		CNV2		Inverness	Nova Scotia
Iona Station (Bobier Strip) Aerodrome		COS2		Iona Station	Ontario
Iqaluit Airport	CYFB		YFB	Iqaluit	Nunavut
Iroquois Airport		CNP7		Iroquois	Ontario
Iroquois Falls Airport		CNE4		Iroquois Falls	Ontario
Island Lake Airport	CYIV		YIV	Island Lake	Manitoba
Isle-aux-Grues Airport		CSH2		Isle-aux-Grues	Quebec
Ituna Airport		CJM2		Ituna	Saskatchewan
Ivujivik Airport	CYIK		YIK	Ivujivik	Quebec

== J ==
Airport name	ICAO	TC LID	IATA	Community	Province or territory
JA Douglas McCurdy Sydney Airport	CYQY		YQY	Sydney	Nova Scotia
Jan Lake Airport		CKM4		Jan Lake	Saskatchewan
Janvier Airport		CEP5		Janvier	Alberta
Jasper Airport	CYJA			Jasper	Alberta
Jean Lake Airport		CFF3		Jean Lake	Alberta
Jean Marie River Airport		CET9		Jean Marie River	Northwest Territories
Jenpeg Airport	CZJG		ZJG	Jenpeg	Manitoba
John C. Munro Hamilton International Airport (Hamilton/John C. Munro International Airport)	CYHM		YHM	Hamilton	Ontario
John D'Or Prairie Aerodrome		CFG5		John D'Or Prairie	Alberta
Johnson Lake Airport		CFL9		Johnson Lake	Alberta
Joliette Airport		CSG3		Joliette	Quebec
Joliette/Saint-Thomas Aerodrome		CJO2		Saint-Thomas	Quebec
Juniper Airport		CCE3		Juniper	New Brunswick

== K ==
Airport name	ICAO	TC LID	IATA	Community	Province or territory
Kakabeka Falls Airport		CKG8		Kakabeka Falls	Ontario
Kamloops Airport	CYKA		YKA	Kamloops	British Columbia
Kamloops (Royal Inland Hospital) Heliport		CBC4		Kamloops	British Columbia
Kamloops Water Aerodrome		CAH7		Kamloops	British Columbia
Kamsack Airport		CJN2		Kamsack	Saskatchewan
Kananaskis Village Helistop Heliport		CFE7		Kananaskis Village	Alberta
Kanawata Aeroparc		CSJ2		Kanawata	Quebec
Kangiqsualujjuaq (Georges River) Airport	CYLU		XGR	Kangiqsualujjuaq	Quebec
Kangiqsujuaq (Wakeham Bay) Airport	CYKG			Kangiqsujuaq	Quebec
Kangirsuk Airport	CYAS		YKG	Kangirsuk	Quebec
Kapuskasing Airport	CYYU		YYU	Kapuskasing	Ontario
Kars/Jenkins Cove Water Aerodrome		CJO3		Kars	New Brunswick
Kars/Rideau Valley Air Park (Rideau Valley Air Park)		CPL3		Kars	Ontario
Kasabonika Airport	CYAQ		XKS	Kasabonika Lake First Nation	Ontario
Kasba Lake Airport		CJL8		Kasba Lake	Northwest Territories
Kasba Lake Water Aerodrome		CJP5		Kasba Lake	Northwest Territories
Kashabowie Outposts (Eva Lake) Water Aerodrome		CKO2		Kashabowie	Ontario
Kashabowie/Upper Shebandowan Lake Water Aerodrome		CKF5		Kashabowie	Ontario
Kashechewan Airport	CZKE		ZKE	Kashechewan First Nation	Ontario
Kaskattama River Aerodrome		CAS3		Kaskattama River	Manitoba
Kaslo Airport		CBR2		Kaslo	British Columbia
Kattiniq/Donaldson Airport		CTP9	YAU	Kattiniq	Quebec
Keene/Elmhirst's Resort Airport		CPS2		Keene	Ontario
Keene/Elmhirst's Resort Water Aerodrome		CNQ6		Keene	Ontario
Keewaywin Airport		CPV8	KEW	Keewaywin First Nation	Ontario
Kelowna (Alpine) Heliport		CAB7		Kelowna	British Columbia
Kelowna (Argus) Heliport		CRG2		Kelowna	British Columbia
Kelowna (General Hospital) Heliport		CKH9		Kelowna	British Columbia
Kelowna/Ikon Adventures Heliport		CIA2		Kelowna	British Columbia
Kelowna International Airport	CYLW		YLW	Kelowna	British Columbia
Kelowna (Valhalla) Heliport		CVA3		Kelowna	British Columbia
Kelowna (Wildcat Helicopters) Heliport		CWC2		Kelowna	British Columbia
Kelsey Airport	CZEE		KES	Kelsey	Manitoba
Kelvington Airport		CKV2		Kelvington	Saskatchewan
Kelvington/Clayton Air 2 Aerodrome		CKA2		Kelvington	Saskatchewan
Kemano Heliport		CBZ2		Kemano	British Columbia
Kemess Creek Airport		CBQ7		Kemess Mine	British Columbia
Kennisis Lake/Francis Water Aerodrome		CKS2		West Guilford (Kennisis Lake)	Ontario
Kennisis Lake/Halminen Water Aerodrome		CHM3		West Guilford (Kennisis Lake)	Ontario
Kennisis Lake/Jenny's Landing Water Aerodrome		CKL4		West Guilford (Kennisis Lake)	Ontario
Kenora Airport	CYQK		YQK	Kenora	Ontario
Kenora (Lake of The Woods District Hospital) Heliport		CJG6		Kenora	Ontario
Kenora (Peterson's Landing) Water Aerodrome		CPL7		Kenora	Ontario
Kenora Water Aerodrome		CJM9		Kenora	Ontario
Kentville (Camp Aldershot) Heliport		CKM9		Kentville	Nova Scotia
Kentville (Valley Regional Hospital) Heliport		CKV8		Kentville	Nova Scotia
Kerrobert Airport		CJP2		Kerrobert	Saskatchewan
Kerrobert Heliport		CKR2		Kerrobert	Saskatchewan
Key Lake Airport	CYKJ		YKJ	Key Lake	Saskatchewan
Kilbride (Bot) Heliport		CCB8		Kilbride	Ontario
Killam (Health Centre) Heliport		CKH5		Killam	Alberta
Killam-Sedgewick/Flagstaff Regional Airport		CEK6		Killam	Alberta
Killarney Airport		CPT2		Killarney	Ontario
Killarney (Killarney Mountain Lodge) Water Aerodrome		CKY4		Killarney	Ontario
Killarney Municipal Airport		CJS5		Killarney	Manitoba
Kimmirut Airport	CYLC		YLC	Kimmirut	Nunavut
Kincardine Municipal Airport	CYKM		YKD	Kincardine	Ontario
Kincardine/Shepherd's Landing Airport		CKS9		Kincardine	Ontario
Kincardine (South Bruce Grey Health Centre) Heliport		CPU2		Kincardine	Ontario
Kincolith Water Aerodrome		CBA3		Ging̱olx	British Columbia
Kindersley Regional Airport	CYKY		YKY	Kindersley	Saskatchewan
King City/Kingsbridge Heliport		CKC3		King City	Ontario
Kingfisher Lake Airport		CNM5	KIF	Kingfisher First Nation	Ontario
Kingston (General Hospital) Heliport		CPJ7		Kingston	Ontario
Kingston Norman Rogers Airport	CYGK		YGK	Kingston	Ontario
Kingston/Riverland Aerodrome		CRL9		Kingston	Ontario
Kinngait Airport	CYTE		YTE	Kinngait	Nunavut
Kipling Airport		CKD5		Kipling	Saskatchewan
Kirby Lake Aerodrome		CRL4		Kirby Lake	Alberta
Kirkfield/Balsam Lake Aerodrome		CKD8		Kirkfield (Balsam Lake)	Ontario
Kirkfield/Balsam Lake (Dutto) Water Aerodrome		CDA8		Kirkfield (Balsam Lake)	Ontario
Kirkfield/Balsam Lake (Erlandson) Water Aerodrome		CBE6		Kirkfield (Balsam Lake)	Ontario
Kirkfield/Balsam Lake (Grand Island) Water Aerodrome		CBG4		Kirkfield (Balsam Lake)	Ontario
Kirkfield/Balsam Lake Seaplane Base		CKW7		Kirkfield (Balsam Lake)	Ontario
Kirkfield/Dimkovski Airpark		CDM3		Kirkfield	Ontario
Kirkfield (Palestine) Aerodrome		CKP4		Kirkfield	Ontario
Kirkland Lake Airport	CYKX		YKX	Kirkland Lake	Ontario
Kisbey/Brigden Field Aerodrome		CBR3		Kisbey	Saskatchewan
Kitchener/Waterloo Regional Airport (Region of Waterloo International Airport)	CYKF		YKF	Regional Municipality of Waterloo	Ontario
Kitimat Airport		CBW2		Kitimat	British Columbia
Kitkatla Water Aerodrome		CAP7	YKK	Kitkatla	British Columbia
Kleinburg (Tavares Field) Aerodrome		CTV4		Kleinburg	Ontario
Knee Lake Airport		CJT3		Knee Lake	Manitoba
Knee Lake Water Aerodrome		CKW8		Knee Lake	Manitoba
Kugaaruk Airport	CYBB		YBB	Kugaaruk	Nunavut
Kugluktuk Airport	CYCO		YCO	Kugluktuk	Nunavut
Kuujjuaq Airport	CYVP		YVP	Kuujjuaq	Quebec
Kuujjuarapik Airport	CYGW		YGW	Kuujjuarapik	Quebec
Kyle Airport		CJB8		Kyle	Saskatchewan
Kyuquot Water Aerodrome		CAR7		Kyuquot	British Columbia
