= List of airports in Canada (C–D) =

This is an list of all Nav Canada certified and registered water and land airports, aerodromes and heliports in the provinces and territories of Canada. The list is sorted alphabetically as shown in the Canada Flight Supplement (and the name as used by the airport if different) and airports names in italics are part of the National Airports System.

They are listed in the format:

- Airport name as listed by either the Canada Flight Supplement (CFS) or the airport authority, alternate name, International Civil Aviation Organization (ICAO) code, Transport Canada Location identifier (TC LID) International Air Transport Association (IATA) code, community and province.

== C ==
Airport name	ICAO	TC LID	IATA	Community	Province or territory
Cable Head Airpark		CCA3		Cable Head	Prince Edward Island
Cabri Airport		CJJ5		Cabri	Saskatchewan
Cache Creek Airport		CAZ5		Cache Creek	British Columbia
Calgary (Aerial Recon) Heliport		CAR3		Calgary	Alberta
Calgary (Alberta Children's Hospital) Heliport		CAC6		Calgary	Alberta
Calgary/Blue Con Heliport		CBC6		Calgary	Alberta
Calgary (Bow Crow) Heliport		CEP2		Calgary	Alberta
Calgary/Christiansen Field Aerodrome		CRS3		Okotoks	Alberta
Calgary/Eastlake Heliport		CEL9		Calgary	Alberta
Calgary/Elephant Enterprises Inc. Heliport		CEE2		Calgary	Alberta
Calgary (Foothills Hospital McCaig Tower) Heliport		CMT3		Calgary	Alberta
Calgary International Airport (Calgary/YYC Calgary International Airport, Calgary International Airport)	CYYC	CYYC	YYC	Calgary	Alberta
Calgary/K. Coffey Residence Heliport		CKC4		Calgary	Alberta
Calgary/Okotoks Air Ranch Airport		CFX2		Okotoks	Alberta
Calgary/Okotoks (GG Ranch) Heliport		COK2		Okotoks	Alberta
Calgary/Okotoks (Rowland Field) Aerodrome		CRF4		Okotoks	Alberta
Calgary (Peter Lougheed Centre) Heliport		CLC3		Calgary	Alberta
Calgary (Rockyview Hospital) Heliport		CEM2		Calgary	Alberta
Calgary (South Health Campus Hospital) Heliport		CSH3		Calgary	Alberta
Calgary/Springbank Airport (Springbank Airport)	CYBW	CYBW	YBW	Calgary	Alberta
Calgary/YYC Calgary International Airport (Calgary International Airport, YYC Calgary International Airport)	CYYC	CYYC	YYC	Calgary	Alberta
Calling Lake Airport		CFK4		Calling Lake	Alberta
Calmar/Wizard Lake Aerodrome		CWL3		Calmar	Alberta
Cambridge Bay Airport	CYCB		YCB	Cambridge Bay	Nunavut
Cambridge Bay Water Aerodrome		CJD7		Cambridge Bay	Nunavut
Cambridge (Puslinch Lake) Water Aerodrome		CMB3		Cambridge (Puslinch Lake)	Ontario
Cambridge/Reid's Field Airport		CPE4		Cambridge	Ontario
Camden East Aerodrome		CCE6		Camden East	Ontario
Camden East/Varty Lake Aerodrome		CVL3		Camden East	Ontario
Cameron/Arbour Airfield		CAR4		Cameron	Ontario
Campbell River Airport	CYBL		YBL	Campbell River	British Columbia
Campbell River (Campbell River & District Hospital) Heliport		CAT6		Campbell River	British Columbia
Campbell River (Graham Air Limited) Heliport		CCR6		Campbell River	British Columbia
Campbell River (Sealand Aviation) Heliport		CSL4		Campbell River	British Columbia
Campbell River Water Aerodrome (Campbell River Harbour Airport)		CAE3	YBL	Campbell River	British Columbia
Campbellville (Bellshill Airpark) Aerodrome		CMB5		Campbellville	Ontario
Camp Cordero Water Aerodrome		CAK6		Camp Cordero	British Columbia
Camrose Airport		CEQ3		Camrose	Alberta
Camrose/St. Mary's Hospital Heliport		CMR6		Camrose	Alberta
Camsell Portage Airport		CJP6		Camsell Portage	Saskatchewan
CFB Bagotville (Bagotville Airport)	CYBG		YBG	La Baie	Quebec
CFB Borden (Borden Heliport)	CYBN		YBN	CFB Borden	Ontario
CFB Cold Lake (Cold Lake/Group Captain R.W. McNair Airport)	CYOD	CYOD	YOD	Cold Lake	Alberta
CFB Comox (Comox Airport)	CYQQ		YQQ	Comox	British Columbia
CFB Edmonton (Edmonton/Namao Heliport)	CYED	CYED	YED	Edmonton	Alberta
CFB Gagetown (Gagetown Heliport)	CYCX		YCX	Oromocto	New Brunswick
CFB Goose Bay (Goose Bay Airport)	CYYR		YYR	Happy Valley-Goose Bay	Newfoundland and Labrador
CFB Greenwood (Greenwood Airport)	CYZX		YZX	Greenwood	Nova Scotia
CFB Moose Jaw (Moose Jaw/Air Vice Marshal C.M. McEwen Airport)	CYMJ		YMJ	Moose Jaw	Saskatchewan
CFB Shearwater (Shearwater Heliport, Halifax/Shearwater Heliport)	CYAW		YAW	Shearwater	Nova Scotia
CFB Suffield (Suffield Heliport)	CYSD	CYSD	YSD	Suffield	Alberta
CFB Trenton (Trenton Airport)	CYTR		YTR	Trenton	Ontario
CFB Valcartier (Valcartier (W/C J.H.L. (Joe) Lecomte) Heliport)	CYOY		YOY	Saint-Gabriel-de-Valcartier	Quebec
CFB Wainwright (Wainwright/Camp Wainwright Field Heliport) (Note: Wainwright/Camp Wainwright Field Airport is a 5,036 ft (1,535 m) grass strip located at the base, and Wainwright/Wainwright (Field 21) Airport is a 7,349 ft (2,240 m) asphalt runway approximately 7 NM (13 km; 8.1 mi) west of the base.)		CFF7		Wainwright	Alberta
CFB Winnipeg (Winnipeg James Armstrong Richardson International Airport)	CYWG		YWG	Winnipeg	Manitoba
Candle Lake Airpark		CCL2		Candle Lake	Saskatchewan
Canmore (Hospital) Heliport		CCH3		Camrose	Alberta
Canmore Municipal Heliport		CEW9		Canmore	Alberta
Canmore/Nakoda Heliport		CNK7		Canmore	Alberta
Canso (Eastern Memorial Hospital) Heliport		CCE5		Canso	Nova Scotia
Carcross Airport		CFA4		Carcross	Yukon
Carcross Water Aerodrome		CEB7		Carcross	Yukon
Cardston Airport		CEA6		Cardston	Alberta
Carey Lake Airport		CNX3		Carey Lake	Ontario
Carignan (Bouthiller) Aerodrome		CRG3		Carignan	Quebec
Carignan/Rivère l'Acadie Water Aerodrome		CJF2		Carignan	Quebec
Carleton Place Airport		CNR6		Carleton Place	Ontario
Carlyle Airport		CJQ3		Carlyle	Saskatchewan
Carmacks Airport		CEX4		Carmacks	Yukon
Carman/Friendship Field Airport		CJB2		Carman	Manitoba
Carman (South) Airport		CJS7		Carman	Manitoba
Carnarvon/Kushog Lake Water Aerodrome		CKA7		Carnarvon	Ontario
Carnarvon/Whistlewing Aerodrome		CRV3		Carnarvon	Ontario
Carp Airport (Ottawa/Carp Airport)	CYRP		YRP	Carp	Ontario
Carstairs/Bishell's Airport		CGB2		Carstairs	Alberta
Cartwright Airport	CYCA		YRF	Cartwright	Newfoundland and Labrador
Carway/Grizzly Creek Ranch Heliport		CGC4		Carway	Alberta
Cascades Water Aerodrome		CTY3		Cascades	Quebec
Casey (Camp de Base) Aerodrome		CSQ4		Hibbard	Quebec
Casselman/Nation River Water Aerodrome		CAS6		Casselman	Ontario
Castlegar Airport (West Kootenay Regional Airport)	CYCG		YCG	Castlegar	British Columbia
Castlegar (Tarrys Convention Centre) Heliport		CCT3		Castlegar	British Columbia
Castor Airport		CER2		Castor	Alberta
Cat Lake Airport	CYAC		YAC	Cat Lake First Nation	Ontario
Causapscal Airport		CTF3		Causapscal	Quebec
Cayley/A. J. Flying Ranch Airport		CAJ7		Cayley	Alberta
Cayuga (Bruce Field) Aerodrome		CCG5		Cayuga	Ontario
Cayuga East Aerodrome		CAF2		Cayuga	Ontario
Central Butte Airport		CJC4		Central Butte	Saskatchewan
Centralia (Essery Field) Aerodrome		CES5		Centralia	Ontario
Centralia/James T. Field Memorial Aerodrome (RCAF Station Centralia)	CYCE		YCE	Centralia	Ontario
Centredale Aerodrome		CDL8		Centredale	Nova Scotia
Centreville/Graham Field		CGR7		Centreville	New Brunswick
Chandos Lake/Sciuk's Landing Water Aerodrome		CCL5		Apsley (Chandos Lake)	Ontario
Chapleau Airport	CYLD		YLD	Chapleau	Ontario
Chapman Aerodrome		CEZ2		Chapman Lake	Yukon
Charlevoix Airport	CYML		YML	Charlevoix	Quebec
Charlo Airport	CYCL		YCL	Charlo	New Brunswick
Charlot River Airport		CJP9		Charlot River Power Station	Saskatchewan
Charlottetown Airport		CCH4	YHG	Charlottetown	Newfoundland and Labrador
Charlottetown Alexander B. Campbell Airport	CYYG		YYG	Charlottetown	Prince Edward Island
Charlottetown (Queen Elizabeth Hospital) Heliport		CDV3		Charlottetown	Prince Edward Island
Chatham-Kent Airport	CYCK		XCM	Chatham-Kent	Ontario
Chatham-Kent Health Alliance (Chatham) Heliport		CPG8		Chatham-Kent	Ontario
Cheadle/Country Lane Farms Aerodrome		CLF2		Cheadle	Alberta
Chesterfield Inlet Airport	CYCS		YCS	Chesterfield Inlet	Nunavut
Chestermere (Kirkby Field) Airport		CFX8		Chestermere	Alberta
Chetwynd Airport	CYCQ		YCQ	Chetwynd	British Columbia
Chevery Airport	CYHR		YHR	Chevery	Quebec
Chibougamau/Chapais Airport	CYMT		YMT	Chibougamau	Quebec
Chibougamau Heliport		CSB4		Chibougamau	Quebec
Chibougamau (Hydro-Québec) Heliport		CSE2		Chibougamau	Quebec
Chicoutimi (C. H. de Chicoutimi) Heliport		CCS7		Chicoutimi	Quebec
Chicoutimi/Saint-Honoré Airport	CYRC			Chicoutimi	Quebec
Chilko Lake (Tsylos Park Lodge) Aerodrome		CAG3	CJH	Chilko Lake	British Columbia
Chilko Lake (Wilderness Lodge) Aerorome		CCL6		Chilko Lake	British Columbia
Chilliwack Airport	CYCW		YCW	Chilliwack	British Columbia
Chipewyan Lake Airport		CEG5		Chipewyan Lake	Alberta
Chipman Airport		CFU3		Chipman	Alberta
Chipman Airport		CCS4		Chipman	New Brunswick
Chipman/M.Y. Airfield		CMY2		Chipman	Alberta
Chisasibi Airport		CSU2	YKU	Chisasibi	Quebec
Christina Basin Airport		CFF2		Christina Basin	Alberta
Christina Lake Aerodrome		CCL3		Christina Lake	Alberta
Churchill Airport	CYYQ		YYQ	Churchill	Manitoba
Churchill Falls Airport	CZUM		ZUM	Churchill Falls	Newfoundland and Labrador
Churchill (Hudson Bay Helicopters) Heliport		CHB2		Churchill	Manitoba
Churchill/Truway Field Aerodrome		CKS3		Churchill	Ontario
Churchill Water Aerodrome		CJJ7		Churchill	Manitoba
Church Lake Water Aerodrome		CHL3		Church Lake	Nova Scotia
Chute-Saint-Philippe Aerodrome		CCP3		Chute-Saint-Philippe	Quebec
Cigar Lake Airport		CJW7		Cigar Lake mine	Saskatchewan
Clairmont/Meyer’s Airstrip		CMY3		Clairmont	Alberta
Clarenville Airport		CCZ3		Clarenville	Newfoundland and Labrador
Claresholm (General Hospital) Heliport		CFV7		Claresholm	Alberta
Claresholm Industrial Airport (RCAF Station Claresholm)		CEJ4		Claresholm	Alberta
Clearwater Aerodrome		CDJ4		Clearwater	New Brunswick
Clearwater River Airport		CFS8		Clearwater River	Alberta
Cline River Heliport		CCR5		Cline River	Alberta
Clova/Lac Duchamp Water Aerodrome		CST6		Clova	Quebec
Clyde River Airport	CYCY		YCY	Clyde River	Nunavut
Coaldale (Rednek Air) Aerodrome		CRD2		Coaldale	Alberta
Coal Harbour Water Aerodrome		CAQ3		Coal Harbour	British Columbia
Cobden/Bruce McPhail Memorial Airport		CPF4		Cobden	Ontario
Cobourg (Northumberland Hills Hospital) Heliport		CNB4		Cobourg	Ontario
Cochrane Aerodrome	CYCN		YCN	Cochrane	Ontario
Cochrane/Arkayla Springs Airport		CKY8		Cochrane	Alberta
Cochrane Water Aerodrome		CNN5		Cochrane	Ontario
Cold Lake/Group Captain R.W. McNair Airport (CFB Cold Lake)	CYOD	CYOD	YOD	Cold Lake	Alberta
Cold Lake Healthcare Centre Heliport		CCH9		Cold Lake	Alberta
Cold Lake Regional Airport		CEN5		Cold Lake	Alberta
Cold Lake/Three Bears Landing Aerodrome		CTB8		Cold Lake	Alberta
Collingwood Airport		CNY3		Collingwood	Ontario
Collingwood/Alta Heliport		CWD2		Collingwood	Ontario
Collingwood (Blue Mountain) Heliport		CBM4		Collingwood	Ontario
Collingwood (General and Marine Hospital) Heliport		CPP2		Collingwood	Ontario
Collingwood/Mountain Road Heliport		CMR4		Collingwood	Ontario
Collingwood (Wilsons) Heliport		CCW2		Collingwood	Ontario
Collins Bay Airport	CYKC			Collins Bay	Saskatchewan
Colville Lake/Tommy Kochon Aerodrome	CYVL		YCK	Colville Lake	Northwest Territories
Colville Lake Water Aerodrome		CED7		Colville Lake	Northwest Territories
Combermere/Bonnie Brae Airfield		CMB8		Combermere	Ontario
Comox Airport (CFB Comox)	CYQQ		YQQ	Comox	British Columbia
Comox Valley Hospital Heliport		CBV8		Comox	British Columbia
Comox Water Aerodrome		CCX6		Comox	British Columbia
Conestogo/Largo Woods Field Aerodrome		CLW6		Conestogo	Ontario
Confederation Lake Water Aerodrome		CJL7		Confederation Lake	Ontario
Conklin (Leismer) Airport		CET2		Conklin	Alberta
Conn Aerodrome		CCN4		Conn	Ontario
Conne River Water Aerodrome		CCR8		Miawpukek First Nation	Newfoundland and Labrador
Consort Airport		CFG3		Consort	Alberta
Consort (Health Centre) Heliport		CCS2		Consort	Alberta
Constance Lake Water Aerodrome		CNQ5		Constance Lake	Ontario
Cooks Creek Aerodrome		CCC3		Cooks Creek	Manitoba
Cookstown Airport		CCT2		Cookstown	Ontario
Cookstown/Kirby Field Aerodrome		CKF8		Cookstown	Ontario
Cookstown/Platinum Park Aerodrome		CRJ2		Cookstown	Ontario
Cookstown/Tally-Ho Field Aerodrome		CTH8		Cookstown	Ontario
Cooper Falls Aerodrome		COP5		Cooper's Falls	Ontario
Coral Harbour Airport	CYZS		YZS	Coral Harbour	Nunavut
Cordova Mines/Belmont Lake Water Aerodrome		CBE4		Cordova Mines (Belmont Lake)	Ontario
Cormier Aerodrome		CRM4		Cormier-Village	New Brunswick
Cornwall (Community Hospital McConnell Site) Heliport		CPS6		Cornwall	Ontario
Cornwall (DEV Centre) Heliport		CNC2		Cornwall	Ontario
Cornwall Regional Airport	CYCC		YCC	Cornwall	Ontario
Coronach/Scobey Border Station Airport		CKK3		Coronach / Scobey, Montana	Saskatchewan
Coronation Airport	CYCT			Coronation	Alberta
Coronation (Health Centre) Heliport		CRH2		Coronation	Alberta
Cortes Island Aerodrome		CCI9	YCF	Cortes Island	British Columbia
Cortes Island Heliport		CBL7		Cortes Island	British Columbia
Cottam Airport		CRB2		Cottam	Ontario
Coulson/Norwood Dale Field Aerodrome		CAD9		Coulson	Ontario
Courtenay Airpark		CAH3	YCA	Courtenay	British Columbia
Courtenay Airpark Water Aerodrome		CBG9		Courtenay	British Columbia
Courtenay (Smit Field) Airport		CCS6		Courtenay	British Columbia
Coutts/Ross International Airport		CEP4		Coutts	Alberta
Cowley Airport	CYYM			Cowley	Alberta
Craik Airport		CJC2		Craik	Saskatchewan
Cranbrook/Canadian Rockies International Airport	CYXC		YXC	Cranbrook	British Columbia
Cranbrook (East Kootenay Regional Hospital) Heliport		CAE2		Cranbrook	British Columbia
Cree Lake/Crystal Lodge (Midgett Field) Aerodrome		CKS8		Cree Lake	Saskatchewan
Cree Lake (Crystal Lodge) Water Aerodrome		CRE4		Cree Lake	Saskatchewan
Creemore Aerodrome		CCR9		Creemore	Ontario
Creston Aerodrome		CAJ3		Creston	British Columbia
Cross Lake (Charlie Sinclair Memorial) Airport	CYCR		YCR	Cross Lake	Manitoba
Crystal City-Pilot Mound/Louise Municipal Airport		CKZ6		Crystal City	Manitoba
Cudworth Municipal Airport		CJD2		Cudworth	Saskatchewan
Cumberland Bay Water Aerodrome		CCB7		Cumberland Bay	New Brunswick
Cumberland House Airport		CJT4		Cumberland House	Saskatchewan

== D ==
Airport name	ICAO	TC LID	IATA	Community	Province or territory
Dalrymple Lake/Powers Water Aerodrome		CDR2		Kirkfield	Ontario
Danville Aerodrome		CDN2		Danville	Quebec
Davidson Municipal Airport		CJC3		Davidson	Saskatchewan
Dawson City Airport	CYDA		YDA	Dawson City	Yukon
Dawson Creek Airport	CYDQ		YDQ	Dawson Creek	British Columbia
Dawson Creek (Flying L Ranch) Airport		CDC3		Dawson Creek	British Columbia
Daysland Health Centre Heliport		CDL3		Daysland	Alberta
Dease Lake Airport	CYDL		YDL	Dease Lake	British Columbia
Debden Airport		CKH3		Debden	Saskatchewan
Debert Airport (CFS Debert)		CCQ3		Debert	Nova Scotia
DeBolt Aerodrome		CFG4		DeBolt	Alberta
DeBolt Fire Hall Heliport		CDB2		DeBolt	Alberta
Deep River/Rolph Airport		CPH2		Deep River	Ontario
Deer Lake Airport	CYVZ		YVZ	Deer Lake First Nation	Ontario
Deer Lake Regional Airport	CYDF		YDF	Deer Lake	Newfoundland and Labrador
Del Bonita/Whetstone International Airport		CEQ4		Del Bonita	Alberta
Delburne/Hall Residence Heliport		CDB3		Delburne	Alberta
Delburne/Stonehill Farms Aerodrome		CSF6		Delburne	Alberta
De Lesseps Lake Airport		CKF9		De Lesseps Lake	Ontario
Delhi Aerodrome		CDH6		Delhi	Ontario
Déline Airport	CYWJ		YWJ	Délı̨nę	Northwest Territories
Déline Water Aerodrome		CEN7		Délı̨nę	Northwest Territories
Deloraine Airport		CJJ4		Deloraine	Manitoba
Delta Heritage Air Park		CAK3		Delta	British Columbia
Denny Island Aerodrome	CYJQ			Denny Island	British Columbia
Detour Lake Aerodrome		CDT9		Detour Lake Mine	Ontario
De Winton (Hamlet) Heliport		CDW3		De Winton	Alberta
De Winton (Highwood) Heliport		CED6		De Winton	Alberta
De Winton/South Calgary Airport (RAF Station De Winton)		CEH4		De Winton	Alberta
Diavik Airport		CDK2		Diavik Diamond Mine	Northwest Territories
Didsbury District Health Services Heliport		CDD7		Didsbury	Alberta
Didsbury/Minty Field Aerodrome		CDM2		Didsbury	Alberta
Digby (General Hospital) Heliport		CDG2		Digby	Nova Scotia
Digby Municipal Airport	CYID		YDG	Digby	Nova Scotia
Dinsmore Aerodrome		CKX5		Dinsmore	Saskatchewan
Disley Aerodrome		CDS2		Lumsden	Saskatchewan
Doaktown Airport		CDU6		Doaktown	New Brunswick
Doctor's Lake East Water Aerodrome		CDL5		Yarmouth	Nova Scotia
Doctor's Lake West Water Aerodrome		CDL6		Yarmouth	Nova Scotia
Dolbeau-Mistassini/Potvin Heli-Base Heliport		CPH4		Dolbeau-Mistassini	Quebec
Donnelly Airport		CFM4		Donnelly	Alberta
Dorset/Averell's Cove Water Aerodrome		CAC5		Dorset	Ontario
Dorset/Kawagama Lake (South) Water Aerodrome		CDK3		Dorset	Ontario
Douglas Lake Airport		CAL3		Douglas Lake	British Columbia
Downs Gulch Aerodrome		CDV2		Downs Gulch	New Brunswick
Drayton Valley (Hospital & Care Centre) Heliport		CFV9		Drayton Valley	Alberta
Drayton Valley Industrial Airport		CER3		Drayton Valley	Alberta
Drumheller (Health Centre) Heliport		CDH2		Drumheller	Alberta
Drumheller Municipal Airport		CEG4		Drumheller	Alberta
Drummondville Airport		CSC3		Drummondville	Quebec
Drummondville Water Aerodrome		CSA7		Drummondville	Quebec
Dryden Best Western Heliport		CKV3		Dryden	Ontario
Dryden Regional Airport	CYHD		YHD	Dryden	Ontario
Dryden Water Aerodrome		CJD8		Dryden	Ontario
Duncan Airport		CAM3	DUQ	Duncan	British Columbia
Duncan (Cowichan District Hospital) Heliport		CDH4		Duncan	British Columbia
Dundalk (Tripp Field) Aerodrome		CTF4		Dundalk	Ontario
Dundas Heliport		CDU2		Dundas	Ontario
Dungannon Aerodrome		CDG3		Dungannon	Ontario
Dunnville (Haldimand War Memorial Hospital) Heliport		CPA9		Dunnville	Ontario
Dunrobin/Django Field Aerodrome		CDJ8		Dunrobin	Ontario
Dunrobin/Parti Field Aerodrome		CPF3		Dunrobin	Ontario
Dunsford Aerodrome		CDU5		Dunsford	Ontario
Dunsford Heliport		CDU8		Dunsford	Ontario
Dunsford Seaplane Base Water Aerodrome		CDS5		Dunsford	Ontario
Durham (Memorial Hospital) Heliport		CPD3		Durham	Ontario
du Rocher-Percé (Pabok) Airport		CTG3		Grande-Rivière	Quebec
Dwight Aerodrome		CNF8		Dwight	Ontario
Dwight (Fox Point) Water Aerodrome		CFP2		Dwight	Ontario
Dwight/Limberlost Forest Water Aerodrome		CLL4		Dwight	Ontario
Dwight/South Portage Water Aerodrome		CLB3		Dwight	Ontario
