= List of airports in Canada (A–B) =

This is an list of all Nav Canada certified and registered water and land airports, aerodromes and heliports in the provinces and territories of Canada. The list is sorted alphabetically as shown in the Canada Flight Supplement (and the name as used by the airport if different) and airports names in italics are part of the National Airports System.

They are listed in the format:

- Airport name as listed by either the Canada Flight Supplement (CFS) or the airport authority, alternate name, International Civil Aviation Organization (ICAO) code, Transport Canada Location identifier (TC LID) International Air Transport Association (IATA) code, community and province.

== A ==
Airport name	ICAO	TC LID	IATA	Community	Province or territory
Abbotsford International Airport	CYXX		YXX	Abbotsford	British Columbia
Abbotsford (Regional Hospital & Cancer Centre) Heliport		CAB5		Abbotsford	British Columbia
Abbotsford (Sumas Mountain) Heliport		CSM7		Abbotsford	British Columbia
Abbotsford (Teck) Heliport		CTK8		Abbotsford	British Columbia
Airdrie Aerodrome		CEF4		Airdrie	Alberta
Airdrie/Waldhof Heliport		CAW3		Airdrie	Alberta
Ajax-Pickering General Hospital Heliport		CPE2		Ajax	Ontario
Ajax (PR Ajax) Aerodrome		CAJ5		Ajax	Ontario
Aklavik/Freddie Carmichael Airport	CYKD		LAK	Aklavik	Northwest Territories
Aklavik Water Aerodrome		CER6		Aklavik	Northwest Territories
Akulivik Airport	CYKO		AKV	Akulivik	Quebec
Alert Airport	CYLT		YLT	Alert	Nunavut
Alert Bay Airport	CYAL		YAL	Alert Bay	British Columbia
Alert Bay Water Aerodrome		CBC3		Alert Bay	British Columbia
Alexandria Aerodrome		CNS4		Alexandria	Ontario
Algoma Mills Water Aerodrome		CPN6		Algoma Mills	Ontario
Alhambra/Ahlstrom Aerodrome		CAM4		Alhambra	Alberta
Alida/Cowan Farm Private Aerodrome		CCF7		Alida	Saskatchewan
Allan Aerodrome		CAN5		Allan	Saskatchewan
Allan J. MacEachen Port Hawkesbury Airport (Port Hawkesbury Airport)	CYPD		YPS	Port Hawkesbury	Nova Scotia
Allan Park Aerodrome		CAP2		Allan Park	Ontario
Alliford Bay Water Aerodrome		CBE7		Alliford Bay	British Columbia
Alliston Airport		CNY4		Alliston	Ontario
Alliston Heliport		CPJ2		Alliston	Ontario
Alliston (Stevenson Memorial Hospital) Heliport		CPZ2		Alliston	Ontario
Alma Airport	CYTF		YTF	Alma	Quebec
Alma (Rivière La Grande Décharge) Water Aerodrome		CGD2		Alma	Quebec
Almonte (General Hospital) Heliport		CAL5		Almonte	Ontario
Amos/Magny Airport	CYEY		YEY	Amos	Quebec
Anahim Lake Airport		CAJ4	YAA	Anahim Lake	British Columbia
Angling Lake/Wapekeka Airport		CKB6	YAX	Wapekeka First Nation	Ontario
Antigonish (St. Martha's Regional Hospital) Heliport		CDY5		Antigonish	Nova Scotia
Antler Valley Farm Heliport		CAV2		Red Deer County	Alberta
Anzac (Long Lake) Heliport		CNZ2		Athabasca oil sands	Alberta
Arborfield Airport		CJM6		Arborfield	Saskatchewan
Arborg Airport		CJU6		Arborg	Manitoba
Arcola Airport		CJA7		Arcola	Saskatchewan
Arctic Bay Airport	CYAB		YAB	Arctic Bay	Nunavut
Arctic Watch Lodge Aerodrome		CRW4		Somerset Island	Nunavut
Arichat (St. Anne Ladies Auxiliary Hospital) Heliport		CDT3		Arichat	Nova Scotia
Armstrong Airport	CYYW		YYW	Armstrong	Ontario
Armstrong Water Aerodrome		CJF6		Armstrong	Ontario
Arnprior Airport		CNP3		Arnprior	Ontario
Arnprior Water Aerodrome		CNB5		Arnprior	Ontario
Arthur (Damascus Field) Aerodrome		CDF6		Arthur	Ontario
Arthur (Peskett Field) Aerodrome		CPK9		Arthur	Ontario
Arthur (Walter's Field) Aerodrome		CPC3		Arthur	Ontario
Arviat Airport	CYEK		YEK	Arviat	Nunavut
Arviat Water Aerodrome		CRV8		Arviat	Nunavut
Ashern Airport		CJE7		Ashern	Manitoba
Assiniboia Airport (RCAF Station Assiniboia)		CJN4		Assiniboia	Saskatchewan
Astorville/Lake Nosbonsing Water Aerodrome		CLN5		Astorville	Ontario
Athabasca Regional Airport	CYWM			Athabasca	Alberta
Atikokan (General Hospital) Heliport		CKF3		Atikokan	Ontario
Atikokan Municipal Aerodrome	CYIB		YIB	Atikokan	Ontario
Atikokan Water Aerodrome		CJH6		Atikokan	Ontario
Atlin Airport	CYSQ			Atlin	British Columbia
Atlin Water Aerodrome		CAD6		Atlin	British Columbia
Attawapiskat Airport	CYAT		YAT	Attawapiskat First Nation	Ontario
Atwood/Coghlin Airport		CAT1		Atwood	Ontario
Aupaluk Airport	CYLA		YPJ	Aupaluk	Quebec
Ayr/Eagle Valley Private Airfield		CAY5		Ayr	Ontario

== B ==
Airport name	ICAO	TC LID	IATA	Community	Province or territory
Baddeck (Guneden) Aerodrome		CDW2		Baddeck	Nova Scotia
Bagotville Airport (CFB Bagotville)	CYBG		YBG	La Baie	Quebec
Baie-Comeau Airport	CYBC		YBC	Baie-Comeau	Quebec
Baie-Comeau (Manic 1) Airport		CSL9		Baie-Comeau	Quebec
Baker Lake Airport	CYBK		YBK	Baker Lake	Nunavut
Baker Lake Water Aerodrome		CJK6		Baker Lake	Nunavut
Bala Aerodrome		CBL8		Bala	Ontario
Bala/Gibson Lake Water Aerodrome		CGL3		Bala (Gibson Lake)	Ontario
Bala (Medora Lake) Aerodrome		CME3		Bala	Ontario
Bala/Muskoka Float Flying Club Water Aerodrome		CBA6		Bala	Ontario
Baldwin Airport		CPB9		Baldwin	Ontario
Baldwin West Aerodrome		CBW8		Baldwin	Ontario
Bamfield Water Aerodrome		CAE9		Bamfield	British Columbia
Bancroft Airport		CNW3		Bancroft	Ontario
Bancroft (North Hastings District Hospital) Heliport		CPB7		Bancroft	Ontario
Banff Airport	CYBA			Banff	Alberta
Banff Mineral Springs (Hospital) Heliport		CBM7		Banff	Alberta
Banff (Park Compound) Heliport		CBP2		Banff	Alberta
Barrage Gouin Water Aerodrome		CTP3		Barrage Gouin Lodge (Saint-Maurice River)	Quebec
Barrhead Airport		CEP3		Barrhead	Alberta
Barrhead (Healthcare Centre) Heliport		CHC3		Barrhead	Alberta
Barrie/Grenfel Field Aerodrome		CGF7		Barrie	Ontario
Barrie-Orillia (Lake Simcoe Regional) Airport (Lake Simcoe Regional Airport)	CYLS		YLK	Barrie	Ontario
Barrie (Royal Victoria Hospital) Heliport		CRV2		Barrie	Ontario
Bar River Airport		CPF2		Bar River	Ontario
Bar River Water Aerodrome		CNE5		Bar River	Ontario
Barry's Bay/Madawaska Valley Airpark		CNZ4		Barry's Bay (Madawaska Valley)	Ontario
Barry's Bay (St. Francis Memorial Hospital) Heliport		CPV6		Barry's Bay	Ontario
Bashaw Airport		CFK2		Bashaw	Alberta
Bassano Airport		CEN2		Bassano	Alberta
Bassano (Health Centre) Heliport		CBL4		Bassano	Alberta
Bathurst Airport	CZBF		ZBF	Bathurst	New Brunswick
Bawlf (Blackwells) Airport		CFR2		Bawlf	Alberta
Beardmore (Health Centre) Heliport		CPY3		Beardmore	Ontario
Bearskin Lake Airport		CNE3	XBE	Bearskin Lake First Nation	Ontario
Beauval Airport		CJK3		Beauval	Saskatchewan
Beaver Creek Airport	CYXQ		YXQ	Beaver Creek	Yukon
Beaverley Airport		CBA8		Beaverley	British Columbia
Beaverlodge Airport		CEU2		Beaverlodge	Alberta
Beaverlodge/Clanachan Aerodrome		CLN4		Beaverlodge	Alberta
Bécancour Heliport		CSV3		Bécancour	Quebec
Beddis Beach Heliport		CBB4		Beddis Beach	British Columbia
Bedwell Harbour Water Aerodrome		CAB3		Bedwell Harbour	British Columbia
Beeton Field Aerodrome		CBF3		Beeton	Ontario
Beiseker Airport		CFV2		Beiseker	Alberta
Bella Bella (Campbell Island) Airport		CBBC	ZEL	Bella Bella	British Columbia
Bella Bella/Shearwater Water Aerodrome		CAW8	YSX	Shearwater	British Columbia
Bella Bella/Waglisla Water Aerodrome		CAR9		Bella Bella	British Columbia
Bella Coola Airport	CYBD		YBD	Bella Coola	British Columbia
Belleville (Marker Field) Aerodrome		CNU4		Belleville	Ontario
Belleville (QHC) Heliport		CBV5		Belleville	Ontario
Bell Island Airport		CCV4		Bell Island	Newfoundland and Labrador
Belwood (Baird Field) Aerodrome		CBF2		Belwood	Ontario
Belwood (Heurisko Pond) Water Aerodrome		CHP2		Belwood	Ontario
Benalto/Hillman's Farm Aerodrome		CBH7		Benalto	Alberta
Berens River Airport	CYBV		YBV	Berens River	Manitoba
Bethany/Whitetail Valley Farm Aerodrome		CVF3		Bethany	Ontario
Big Bay Water Aerodrome		CAF6		Big Bay	British Columbia
Big Bend Airport (Innisfail/Big Bend Aerodrome)		CEM4		Innisfail	Alberta
Biggar Airport		CJF8		Biggar	Saskatchewan
Big Hook Wilderness Camp Water Aerodrome		CJS6		Opasquia Provincial Park	Ontario
Big River Airport		CKX8		Big River	Saskatchewan
Big Sand Lake Airport		CJQ9		Sand Lakes Provincial Park	Manitoba
Big Trout Lake Airport	CYTL		YTL	Kitchenuhmaykoosib Inninuwug First Nation	Ontario
Billy Bishop Toronto City Airport (Toronto Island Airport, Toronto/Billy Bishop Toronto City Airport)	CYTZ		YTZ	Toronto	Ontario
Billy Bishop Toronto City Water Aerodrome		CPZ9		Toronto	Ontario
Birch Hills Airport		CJD3		Birch Hills	Saskatchewan
Birch Mountain Aerodrome		CFM2		Birch Mountain	Alberta
Bird River (Lac du Bonnet) Airport		CJP7		Lac du Bonnet	Manitoba
Bird River Water Aerodrome		CJX6		Lac du Bonnet	Manitoba
Bissett Water Aerodrome		CJY6		Bissett	Manitoba
Bistcho Airport		CPB8		Bistcho Lake	Alberta
Black Diamond/Cu Nim Airport		CEH2		Black Diamond	Alberta
Black Diamond/Flying R Ranch Aerodrome		CBD8		Black Diamond	Alberta
Black Diamond (Oilfields General Hospital) Heliport		CFL3		Black Diamond	Alberta
Blackie/McElroy Ranch Heliport		CMC5		Blackie	Alberta
Blackie/Wilderman Farm Airport		CFT2		Blackie	Alberta
Black Lake Water Aerodrome		CJZ6		Black Lake	Saskatchewan
Blackstock/Martyn Aerodrome		CBM2		Blackstock	Ontario
Black Tickle Airport		CCE4	YBI	Black Tickle	Newfoundland and Labrador
Blairmore (Crowsnest Pass Hospital) Heliport		CBS9		Blairmore	Alberta
Blind Channel Water Aerodrome		CAG6		Blind Channel	British Columbia
Bloodvein River Airport	CZTA		YDV	Bloodvein First Nation	Manitoba
Blue River Airport	CYCP		YCP	Blue River	British Columbia
Bobcaygeon/Chesher Lakehurst Aerodrome		CLH5		Bobcaygeon	Ontario
Bob Quinn Lake Airport		CBW4	YBO	Bob Quinn Lake	British Columbia
Bolton Heliport		CNB2		Bolton	Ontario
Bonadventure (H. Stever) Heliport		CBS3		Bonaventure	Quebec
Bonaventure Airport	CYVB		YVB	Bonaventure	Quebec
Bonnyville Aerodrome	CYBF			Bonnyville	Alberta
Bonnyville Health Centre Heliport		CBN2		Bonnyville	Alberta
Borden Heliport (CFB Borden)	CYBN		YBN	CFB Borden	Ontario
Boston Brook Airport		CCJ3		Boston Brook	New Brunswick
Bottrel/Anchor 9 Ranch Aerodrome		CBR9		Bottrel	Alberta
Bouctouche Aerodrome		CDT5		Grand-Bouctouche	New Brunswick
Boundary Bay Airport (Vancouver/Boundary Bay Airport)	CZBB		YDT	Delta	British Columbia
Bow Island Aerodrome		CEF3		Bow Island	Alberta
Bowmanville Haines St. Hospital Heliport		CLH8		Bowmanville	Ontario
Boyle Airport		CFM7		Boyle	Alberta
Bracebridge (Goltz Farm) Aerodrome		CBG3		Bracebridge	Ontario
Bracebridge (South Muskoka Memorial Hospital) Heliport		CPL2		Bracebridge	Ontario
Bracebridge (Stone Wall Farm) Aerodrome		CSW4		Bracebridge	Ontario
Bracebridge (Tinkham Field) Aerodrome		CTA6		Bracebridge	Ontario
Bracebridge West Aerodrome		CWB2		Bracebridge	Ontario
Bradford Aerodrome		CPM7		Bradford	Ontario
Braeburn Airport (Cinnamon Bun Airstrip)		CEK2		Braeburn Lodge	Yukon
Brampton-Caledon Airport		CNC3		Brampton	Ontario
Brampton (National "D") Heliport		CPC4		Brampton	Ontario
Brandon Municipal Airport (McGill Field)	CYBR		YBR	Brandon	Manitoba
Brant (Dixon Farm) Airport		CEX9		Brant	Alberta
Brantford Airport	CYFD		YFD	Brantford	Ontario
Brebeuf Lake/The Beuf Water Aerodrome		CBR4		Gogama	Ontario
Brechin/Ronan Aircraft Aerodrome (Note: Includes a 2,000 ft (610 m) long water runway.)		CDU7		Brechin	Ontario
Bridgewater/Dayspring Airpark		CDY6		Bridgewater	Nova Scotia
Bridgewater (South Shore Regional Hospital) Heliport		CDT6		Bridgewater	Nova Scotia
Briercrest South Airport		CBS7		Briercrest	Saskatchewan
Bristol Aerodrome		CDA6		Florenceville-Bristol	New Brunswick
Brochet Airport	CYBT		YBT	Brochet	Manitoba
Brockville Regional Tackaberry Airport		CNL3	XBR	Brockville	Ontario
Brockway Airport		CCX3		Brockway	New Brunswick
Bromont (Roland Désourdy) Airport (Roland-Désourdy Airport)	CZBM		ZBM	Bromont	Quebec
Brooks (Community Health Centre) Heliport		CFV8		Brooks	Alberta
Brooks Regional Aerodrome	CYBP			Brooks	Alberta
Bruce Mines/Kerr Field Aerodrome		CBM3		Bruce Mines	Ontario
Brussels (Armstrong Field) Airport		CPD4		Brussels	Ontario
Buckhorn/Upper Buckhorn Lake Water Arodrome		CUB2		Buckhorn (Buckhorn Lake)	Ontario
Buffalo (Jaques Farms) Aerodrome		CJF4		Buffalo	Alberta
Buffalo Narrows Airport	CYVT		YVT	Buffalo Narrows	Saskatchewan
Buffalo Narrows (Fire Centre) Heliport		CBN3		Buffalo Narrows	Saskatchewan
Buffalo Narrows Water Aerodrome		CJB7		Buffalo Narrows	Saskatchewan
Burditt Lake Water Aerodrome		CJC7		Burditt Lake	Ontario
Burk’s Falls/Katrine (Three Mile Lake) Water Aerodrome		CTM5		Burk's Falls	Ontario
Burleigh Falls/Breeze Island Water Aerodrome		CBI3		Burleigh Falls	Ontario
Burlington Executive Airport	CZBA			Burlington	Ontario
Burlington/Hamilton Harbour Water Aerodrome		CHH2		Burlington	Ontario
Burns Lake Airport	CYPZ		YPZ	Burns Lake	British Columbia
Burns Lake (LD Air) Water Aerodrome		CLD3		Burns Lake	British Columbia
Burwash Airport	CYDB		YDB	Burwash Landing	Yukon
