= Limberlost Forest and Wildlife Reserve =

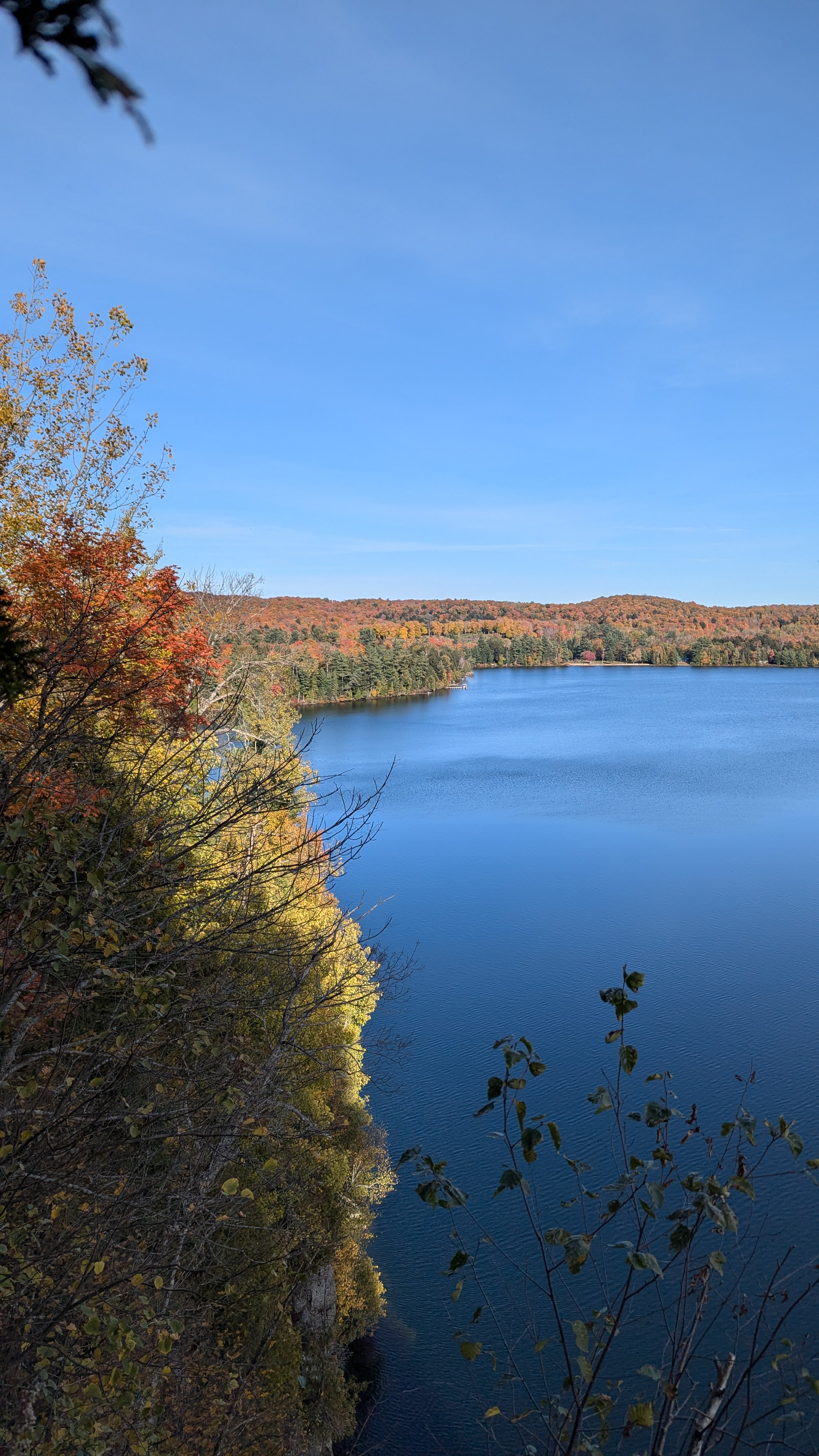
- In J. Albert Bauer Provincial Park facing Limberlost Forest and Wildlife Reserve

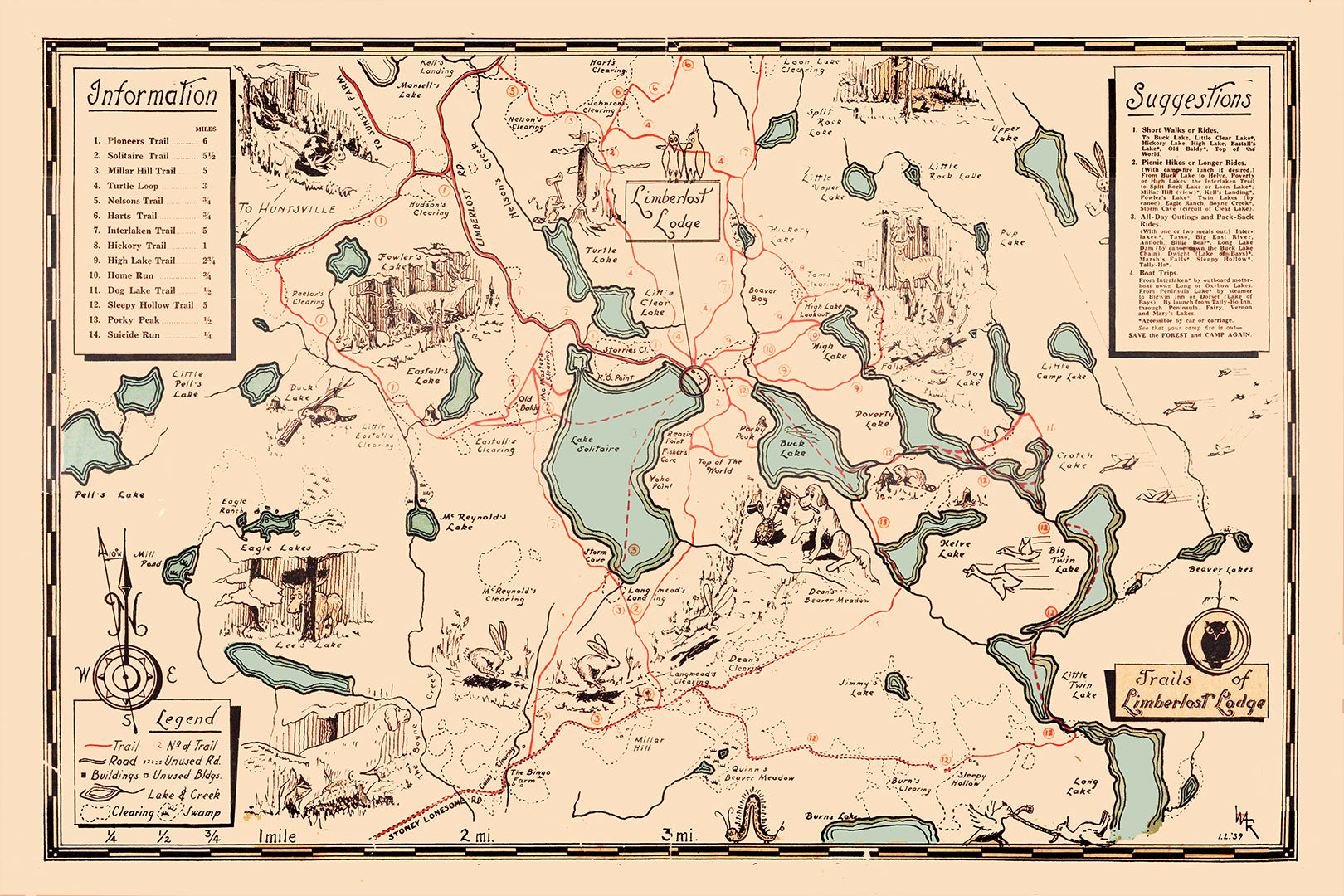

Geography
- Location: Muskoka, Ontario, Canada
- Coordinates: 45.3990°N 79.0011°W

Administration
- Authority: Haliburton Forest Group
- Website: limberlostforest.com

Ecology
- WWF Classification: Eastern Forest–Boreal Transition (NA0606)
- CEC Classification: Georgian Bay Ecoregion, 5E
- Dominant tree species: Red, Sugar, and Striped Maple, Eastern Hemlock, White Pine, Larch, Basswood, White Ash, White and Yellow Birch, American Beech, White Spruce, Balsam Fir and to a limited extent Black Cherry and Oak.

The Limberlost Forest and Wildlife Reserve is a publicly accessible private property near Huntsville, Ontario, Canada. The private forest contains many lakes and forest stands with hiking, biking, skiing and snowshoeing trails throughout that has been made available to the public at no charge. Limberlost practices a form of land management referred to as Conscientious Forest Management which focuses on ensuring the sustainability of their management objectives and actions for generations to come. Some of the management actions undertaken by the private forest include sustainably harvesting timber using the Ontario Ministry of Natural Resources Single Tree Selection System; encouraging the use of the forest by all visitors and eco-tourists at no charge; supporting environmental research programs and institutes; and offering both modern and traditional forest land use options to the local community. The forest's management claims that harvesting is a secondary operation after recreation, and that "some small harvest[s] happen from time to time", and compares it to Haliburton Forest - managed by the same company - which is viewed as a working forest.

The forest contains 20 lakes.

Limberlost's primary objective is to offer continued free access to the 10,000 ac Muskoka property for the purpose of encouraging safe wilderness experiences. They are able to accomplish this by supporting several youth organizations, such as the Trails Youth Initiative, as well as providing hiking trails, associated maps and safety information to day visitors. Upkeep of the property is funded through chalet, cottage, fish-camp, glamping sites, and camp site rentals.

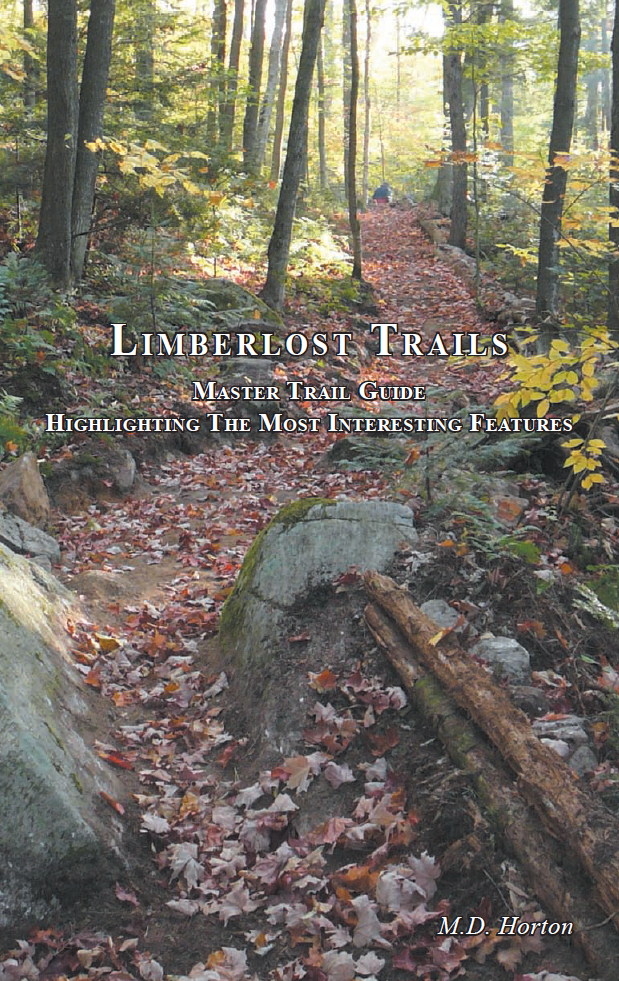
The Master Trail Guide. https://limberlosttestsite.files.wordpress.com/2015/03/limberlost_master_trail_guide.pdf

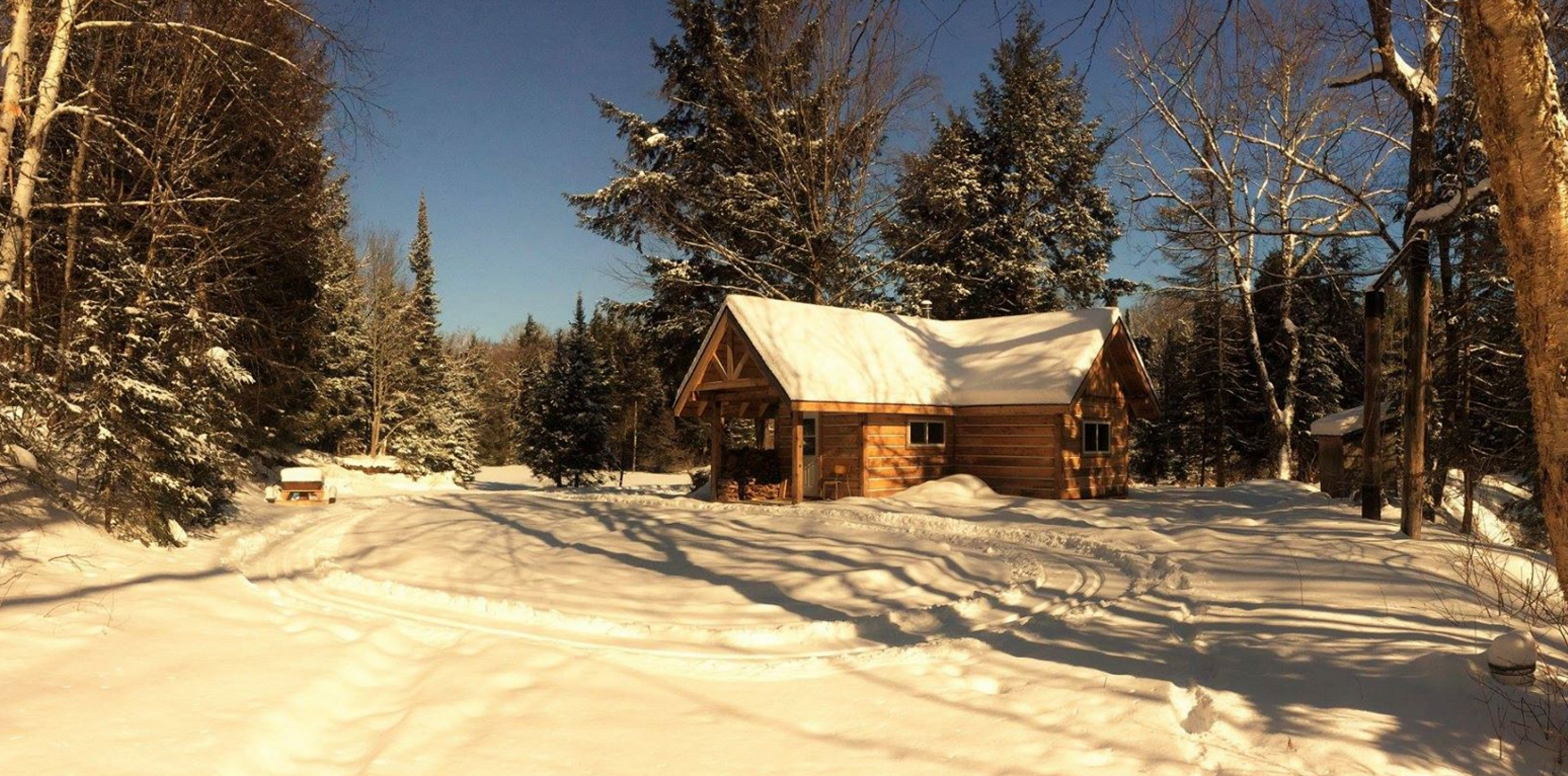
One of the rustic cabins available for rent at the Limberlost Forest. http://limberlostforest.com/accommodations/

Access of the Limberlost Forest is available at the main gate located 3 km off of Muskoka Road 8 in Lake of Bays. Limberlost does not permit the recreational use of snowmobiles, ATVs, UTVs, or any gas powered motor boats, however, bicycles, paddles, hiking boots, and snowshoes are welcome and encouraged.

Since 2003, the Limberlost Reserve has been open to the public, receiving several thousand visitors per year mainly for hiking and bird-watching. It hosts the annual Limberlost Challenge, a 14-56 km run, since 2010.

The forest is owned by the Haliburton Forest Group, which also owns Haliburton Forest, Timmins Forest, and several related wood product businesses. Staff were awarded the Robert de Pencier Award for forest management and promoting forestry education in 2018 from Forests Ontario, and that same year the management company was awarded a leadership award from the Forest Stewardship Council.

The forest inspired Limberlost Place, a timber core building in Toronto.

== See also ==
- Sustainable forest management
