= Haliburton Forest =

Privately owned forest in Ontario, Canada

Coordinates: 45°06′23″N 78°04′02″W

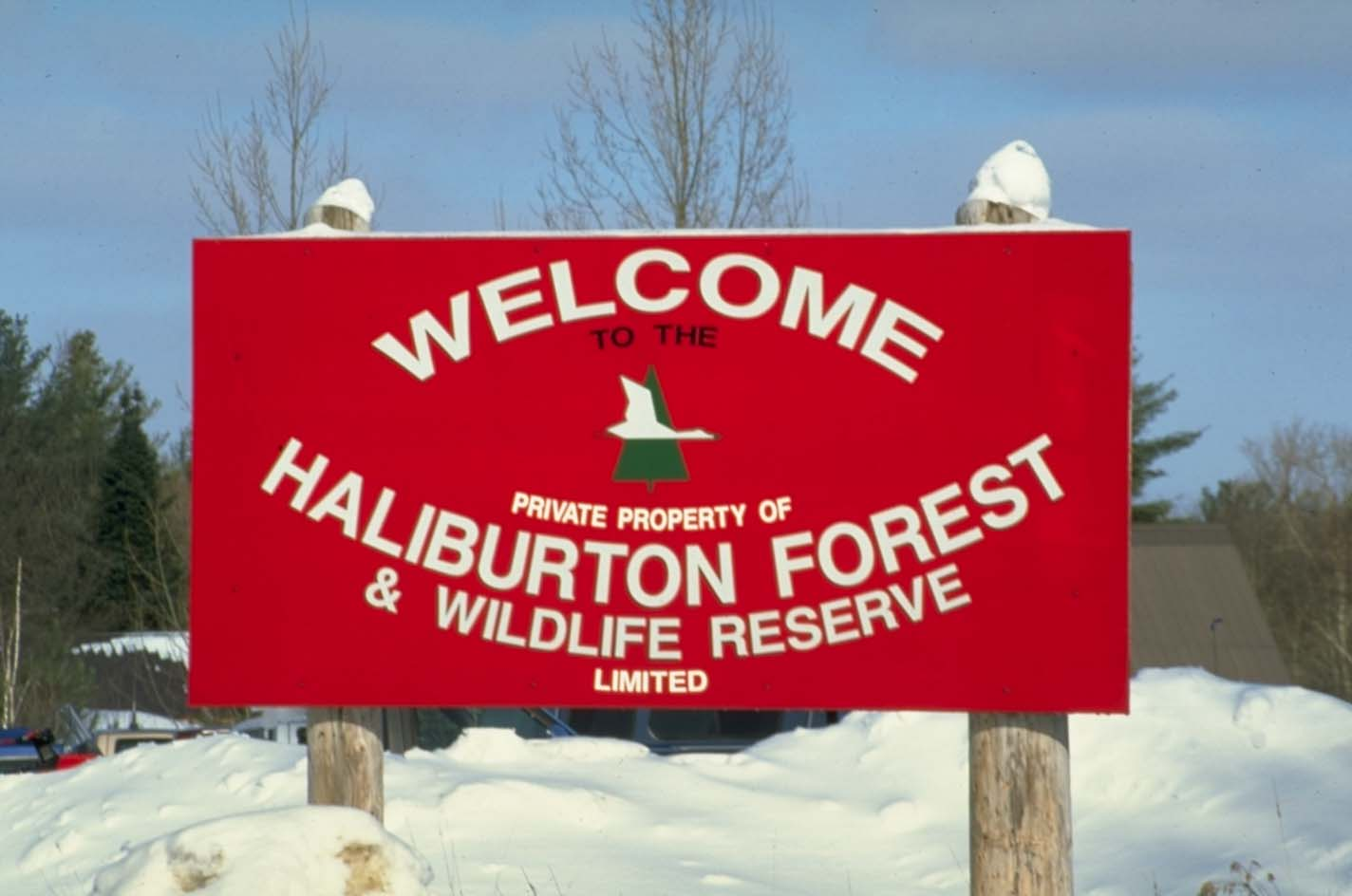
Welcome sign at Base Camp

Haliburton Forest & Wild Life Reserve Ltd. is a 300-square-kilometre (120 sq mi) forest in Haliburton County, Ontario. Forestry operations within the reserve are certified by the international Forest Stewardship Council in Canada. Haliburton Forest also supports ecosystem-based research projects, primarily conducted by the University of Toronto's Faculty of Forestry, and operates year-round recreation, tourism, and education programs.

== History ==
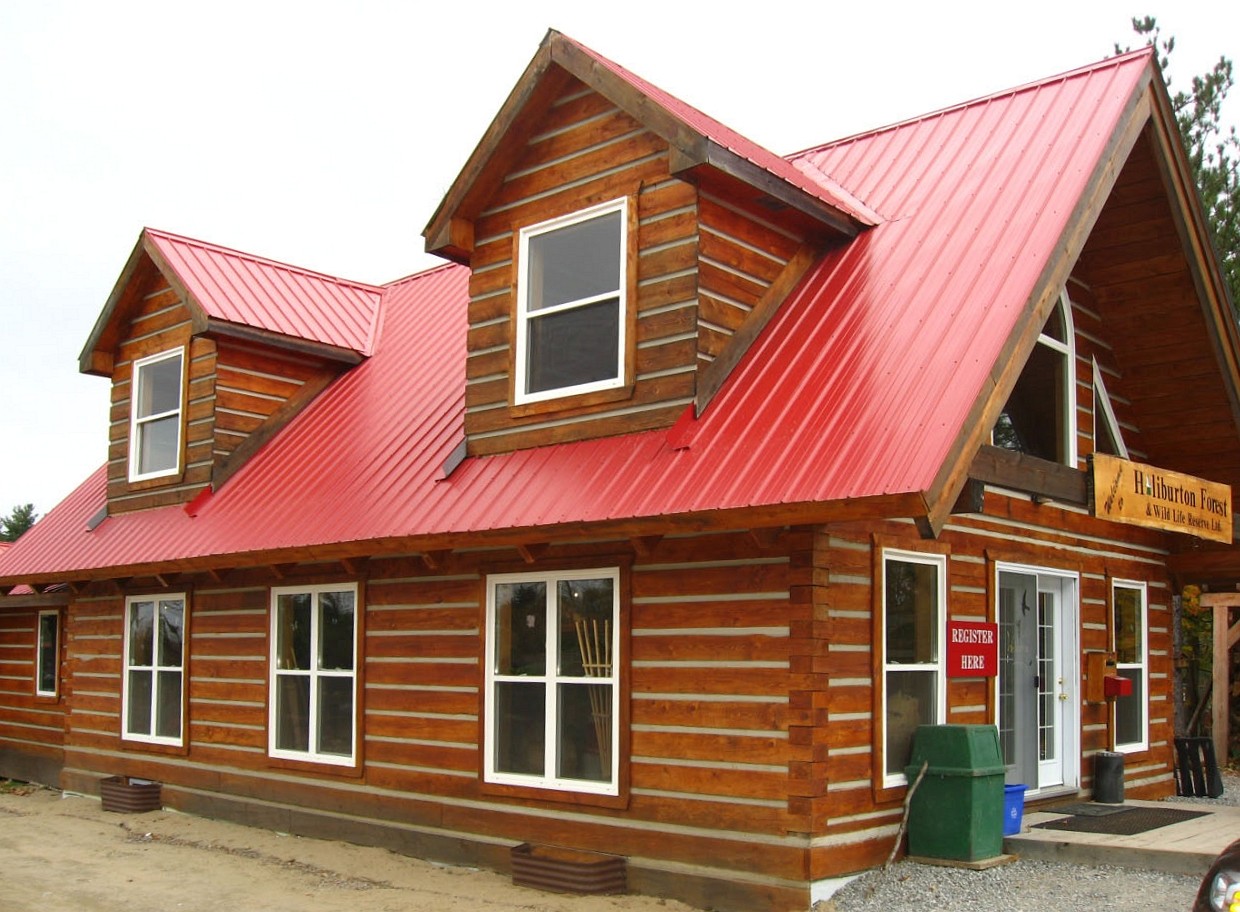
Haliburton Forest Base Camp Office

In the British North American Province of Upper Canada, the northern townships of Peterborough County were first surveyed during the winters of 1862 and 1863. In 1885, 10 of these townships were sold to the London-based Canadian Land and Emigration Company under the leadership of Thomas Chandler Haliburton.

The company planned on subdividing its holdings into 100-acre (0.40 km^{2}) lots and selling them to British emigrants as farmland. These plans were soon canceled when it became obvious that the plots in question, with the exception of a few small parcels, were unsuitable for agriculture. The company went into receivership and was renamed the "Canadian Land and Immigration Company", with headquarters in Toronto.

From 1870 to 1910, large lumber companies acquired cutting rights and cleared most of the white pine stands.

By the 1930s, up to 80,000 acres (320 km^{2}) remained in the hands of the Algonquin Corporation who continued harvesting timber until they were acquired by Hay and Co., a veneer milling company based in Woodstock, Ontario, in 1946. Between 1946 and 1971, more than 150,000,000 board feet (350,000 m^{3}) of lumber had been sawn and several million more board feet of veneer left northern Haliburton for the mother mill in Woodstock. Most of this timber was cut on the land that today makes up Haliburton Forest.

By 1960, two forest inventories suggested that the harvestable volume of timber was rapidly declining on Hay and Co. lands, which had been taken over in the meantime by Weldwood of Canada. The decline in trees due to destructive harvesting methods and the sheer volume cut down during the past century left future milling to be deemed detrimental to the area and unprofitable. This eventually would lead to the land being put up for sale.

In 1962, German Baron von Fuerstenberg acquired the Weldwood property and renamed his holding Haliburton Forest and Wild Life Reserve Ltd. Previously, the lakeshores of Redstone and Kennisis Lakes had been sold off to a development company. The timber rights remained with the Weldwood mill until 1967 before being turned over to the new company. A few years later, in 1970, the sawmill at Kennisis Lake closed down.

== Attractions ==
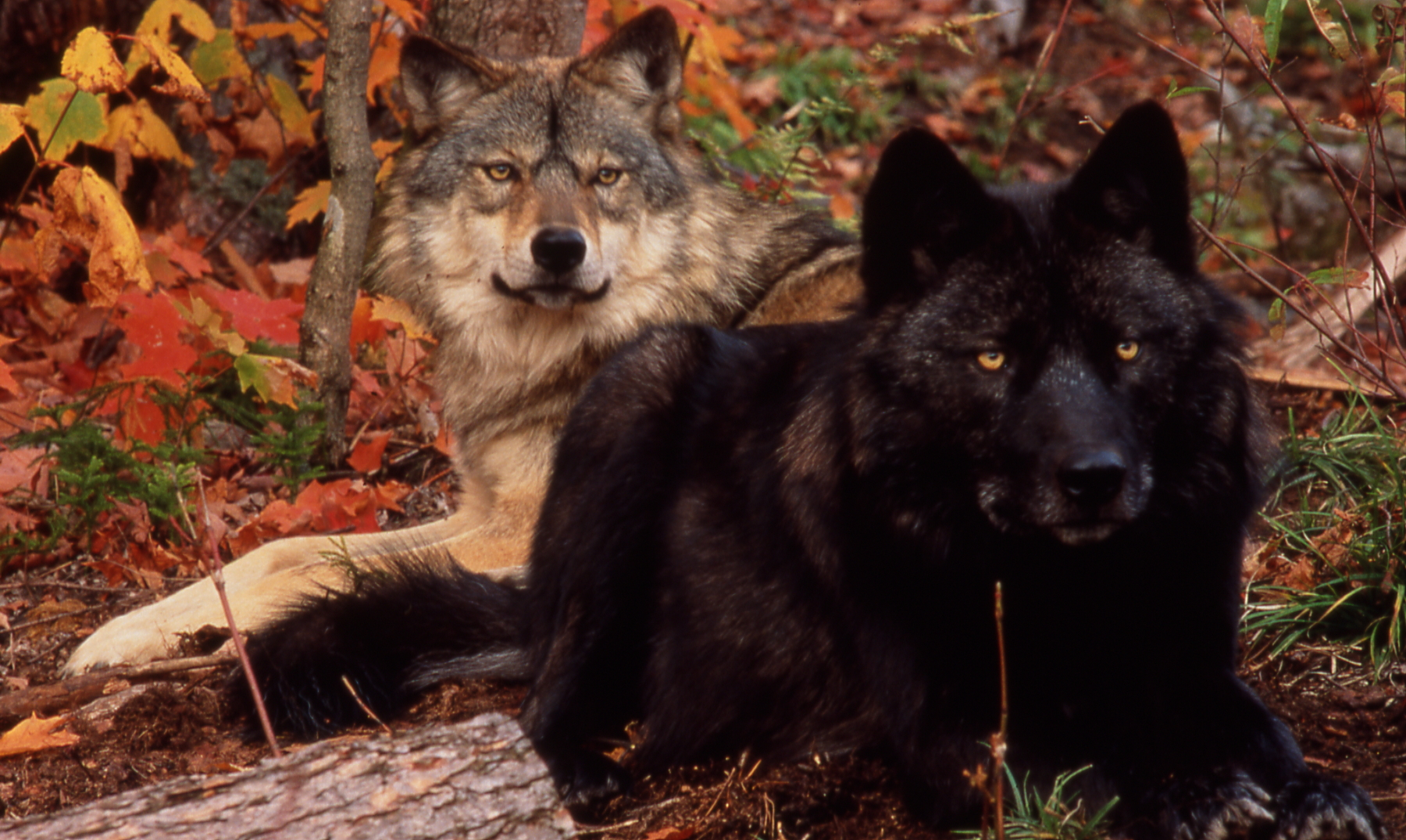
Haliburton Forest wolves

The Wolf Centre opened in July 1996 to the general public and is home to a pack of five timber wolves (Canis lupus). Within the 61,000-square-metre (656,600 sq ft) enclosure, they roam freely. Fed on a random schedule (approximately once a week), they can often be found near the viewing area due to it being close to both the highest point in the enclosure and the wolf's water source.

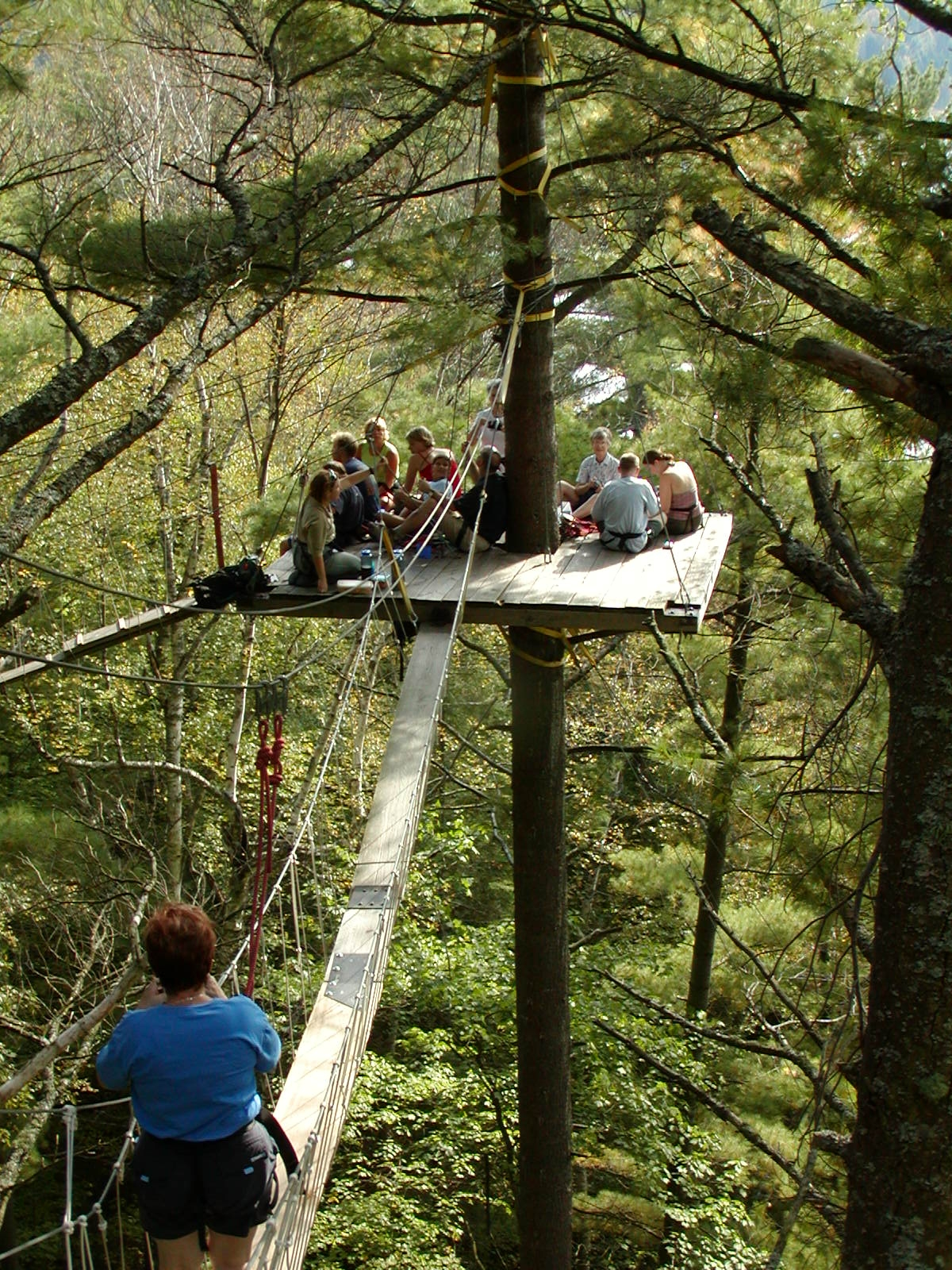
"A Walk in the Clouds", the Haliburton Forest Canopy Tour

The Canopy Tour experience, named "A Walk in the Clouds", is offered to those who visit the reserve and includes the following: a guided van tour through the private lands of Haliburton Forest and Wildlife Reserve Ltd. that passes through forests and along lakes and streams; a 0.5 km walk along the scenic Pelaw River: a short, guided voyageur-canoe ride across a wilderness lake to the final destination—Canopy Boardwalk.

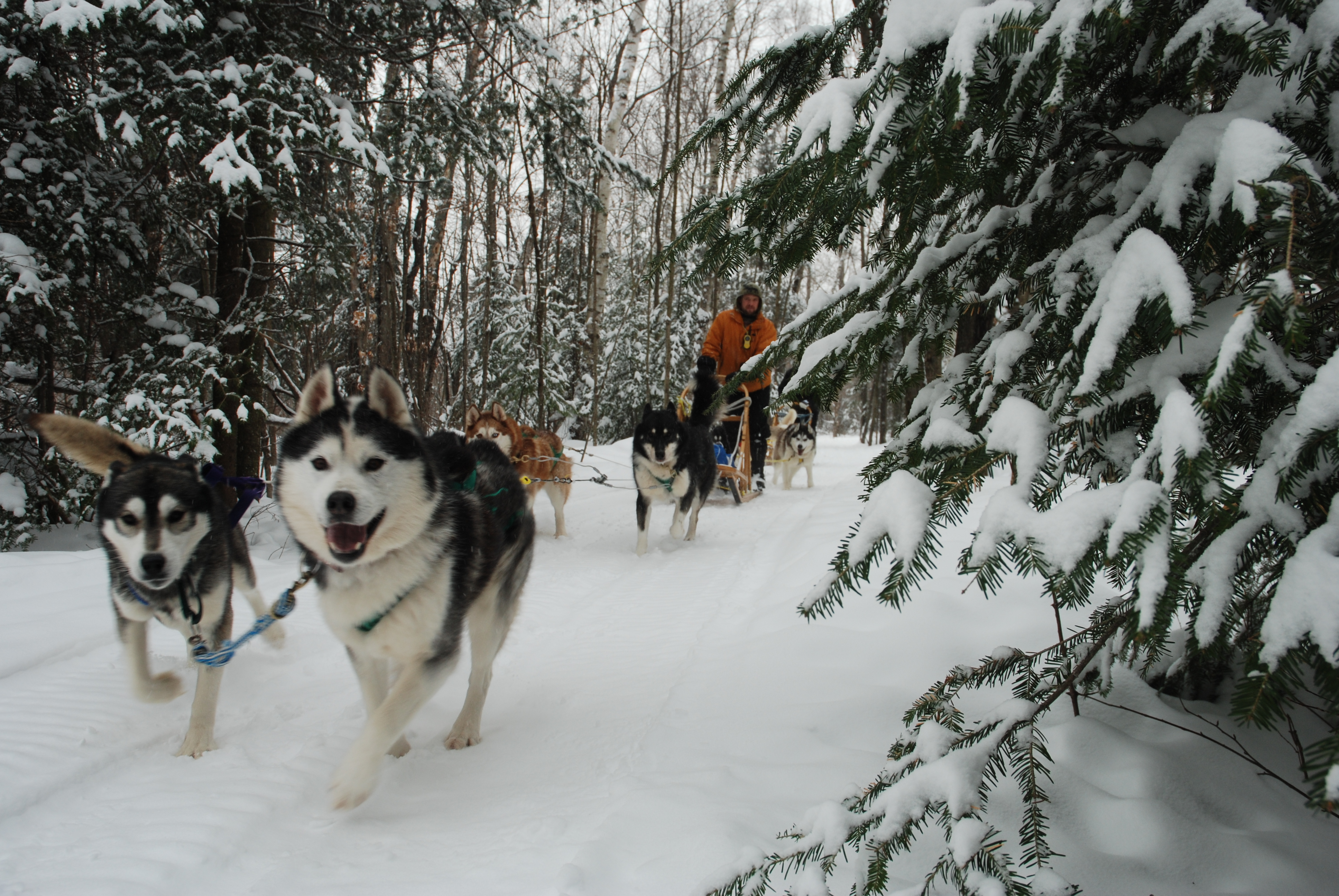
Siberian Huskies mushing at Haliburton Forest

Both half and full-day dog sledding tours are available at Haliburton Forest along groomed winter trails with over 130 Siberian Huskies. Dog Sledding program at Haliburton Forest was shut down in 2021.

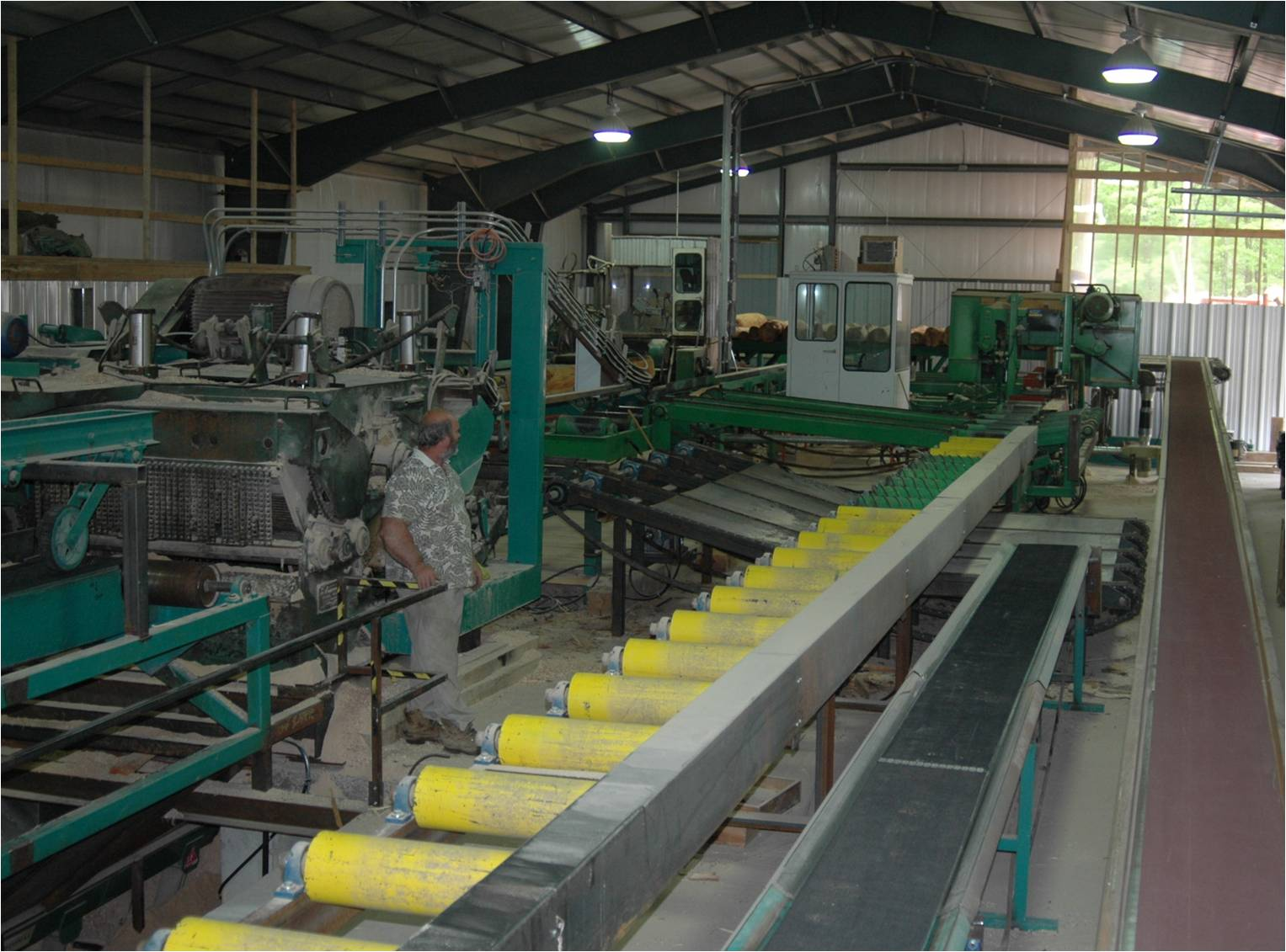
Haliburton Forest sawmill

The new Haliburton Forest sawmill opened to the public in 2010, and hosts tours featuring the milling process.
