= Kennisis Lake =

- sunset in late summer

- Location within Ontario Location within Canada
- Location: Haliburton Highlands, Ontario
- Coordinates: 45°13′N 78°38′W
- Type: Cold Water Glacial Lake
- Basin countries: Canada
- Surface area: 14.17 km^{2} (5.47 sq mi)
- Average depth: 23.4 m (77 ft)
- Max. depth: 95 m (312 ft)
- Water volume: 332.05×10^{6} m^{3} (269,200 acre⋅ft)
- Residence time: 5.26 years
- Surface elevation: 370 m (1,210 ft)

Kennisis Lake is a lake just southwest of Algonquin Provincial Park in Ontario, Canada. With a surface area of over 1,640 hectares (4,100 acres), it is the second-largest lake in the Haliburton Highlands. From end to end, the lake is approximately 11.5 kilometres (7.1 mi) long, including the smaller, interconnected Little Kennisis Lake.

The lake's shoreline lots are almost entirely privately owned, with the newest residences and summer homes being built on the western shore. Kennisis Lake is bordered by Haliburton Forest on the north and east, nearby Algonquin Provincial Park to the north, and also a third tract of land to the west, which is a 24,000-hectare (59,000-acre) tract of Crown land referred to as the Frost Center Area, after Leslie M. Frost. The lake is accessible through the town of West Guilford on County Road 7, Kennisis Lake Road.

== History ==
=== Origins and Ownership ===
Big and Little Lake Kennisis lie in the geographical Township of Havelock and the Municipality of Dysart in Haliburton County, Central Ontario, Canada. The Township of Havelock was named after British general Sir Henry Havelock after his success in relieving the city of Lucknow during the 1857 Mutiny in India. Lake Kennisis was originally named Lake Alexandra by the Canadian Land and Emigration Company (C.L. & E.C.) to honour Alexandra, Princess of Wales. The name was also an attempt by the company directors of London to make the area more appealing to British settlers, but the names didn't remain for long.

In 1859, the Crown Land Department of the Province of Canada offered the ten townships of the area for sale with the hope that private enterprise would enable them to be open to settlement. Sir Francis Bond Head, former Governor of Upper Canada, had interested potential investors in England and was expected to be chairman of the C.L. & E.C., which was incorporated in London in 1861. Yet, Thomas Chandler Haliburton, reputable author, lawyer, justice of the Nova Scotia Supreme Court, and Member of the British Parliament, took Head's place after he turned down the position. After negotiation between the company and the Province of Canada in 1864, the C.L. & E.C. gained ownership of the ten townships. Haliburton's name was given to the settlement in Dysart Township that same year and to the county in 1874 when three townships from Victoria Country and twenty from Peterborough County were joined to create the Provisional County of Haliburton.

=== Settlement ===
The settlement on Lake Kennisis consisted of hard granite that was ill-suited for cultivation, causing few to stay as permanent residents. In addition to the agricultural difficulties brought upon by the land was the lack of proper roads for access to the townships in the area. Although the Bobcaygeon Road, which ran near Minden, and Peterson Road, which ran east from the village of Muskoka Falls near Bracebridge, were available for travel, both roads were virtually impassable much of the year in the early days. By the 1930s, a deal was made by the C.L. & C.E. to have another road constructed from Haliburton Village to Eagle Lake and Redstone. However, it was only in the completion of the road from West Guilford in the 1940s that the area became a vacation property that attracted many people. Later in 1964, the Department of Highways map showed a road along the southern shore of Lake Kennisis and on the northern coast to the Narrow between Big and Little Kennisis. By the first decade of the 21st century, a large number of cottages along the two lakes were built as roads improved and dependable snow clearing made it possible for retirees to live in comfort and security all year long.

== Kennisis Lake Cottage Owner’s Association (KLCOA) ==
The Kennisis Lake Cottage Owner’s Association (KLCOA) is a non-profit organization committed to contributing and providing the best services to its members, cottagers, and visitors. The organization sponsors and conducts many activities for cottagers of all ages during the summer. KLCOA does not operate on a loan, mortgage or any other debt to run its affairs.

=== Events conducted by KLCOA ===
Events and contests that are held by KLOCA every summer include:

- Fishing Tournament
- Island and Road Clean-up, where volunteers and participants spend a couple of hours picking up trash
- Regatta

Celebrations are held for holidays such as Canada Day. All the members, cottagers, and visitors gather together and participate in various activities, barbecues, and fireworks shows at night.

=== The Association ===
The Association consists of Executive Community members such as a President, Vice President, Treasurer, Secretary and Directors. Each member has a role and duty assigned by the Board that contributes to the Association and the cottagers.

The Board conducts meetings during each season to discuss the Association and the events to be held during the summer or other occasions. During these meetings, the Board decides how to improve or solve any problems at Kennisis Lake.

The KLCOA only consists of people who pay an annual fee to be a member. The membership fee is currently $50.

== Norah’s Island ==
Norah's Island is the largest island in Kennisis Lake (22 acres and 1000 meters from the nearest shoreline). The island was named after Norah Carruthers, the late wife of Bruce Carruthers, who owned the island for 32 years. Bruce Carruthers donated the island to the Haliburton Highlands Land Trust in the summer of 2007. Since then, many members of the KLCOA have donated money to the Land Trust's Endowment Fund to maintain the cost of preserving the island's natural habitat. Norah's Island has been deemed a lasting piece of land representing the true ecosystem of Kennisis Lake. The island ecosystem consists of native trees surrounding the lake and many rare, native species of orchids. The island's natural habitat is protected, prohibiting development and allowing access to all of the cottagers to enjoy. The Norah's Island Committee of the Haliburton Highlands Land Trust is in the process of developing a plaque to acknowledge the donors of the Endowment Fund who donated more than $50,000.

=== Norah's Island Land Transfer ===
The land transfer was initiated by Bruce Carruther and the Haliburton Highlands Land Trust under Environment Canada's Ecological Gifts Program, as the Island is ecologically sensitive. The donation of Norah's Island from Bruce Carruthers, in memory of his late wife Norah, in 2007. Ribbons were tied to symbolize the uniting of the Halliburton Highlands Land Trust and the Kennisis Lake Cottage Association. On the day of the land transfer, members of the KLCOA and their families gathered on the island to celebrate the day.

== Activities ==
=== Snowmobiling ===
Volunteers measure ice thickness in the winter and mark water trails that form part of the OFSC main trail system. Kennisis Lake also has connector trails leading to Haliburton Forest and Wildlife’s network of 400km of groomed winter trails.

=== Skiing ===
Residents of the lake maintain the Kennisis ski trails. Measuring 10 kilometres in length, the ski trails reopened off the west shores of Kennisis Lake (in what is known as the Clear Lake Conservation Area). With access on West Shore Road, the trails map west of Kennisis down to the south of Red Pine Lake. The trails first cross 2 parcels of privately owned land (1 parcel belonging to G & T Williams), and the remainder is through the conservation area.

=== Fishing ===
There are three public access points to Kennisis Lake. One access point is adjacent the marina, one point nears the lake's southeast shore between Little and Big Kennisis, while the third access point is at the Kennisis Dam. The availability of access opens the public to the opportunity of fishing on the lake. Kennisis has been stocked with thousands of lake trout since 1925. At all depths, the lake is well-oxygenated all year round. This contributed to the optimal conditions for the growth and naturalized reproduction of the trout population. Despite lacking documented breeding sites, natural reproduction is evident with reported fair catches of unmarked lake trout.

The common white sucker, longnose sucker, yellow perch, brown bullhead, smallmouth bass, largemouth bass, rock bass, and a wide variety of minnow species stocked the rest of the lake's fish population.

=== Tree Planting ===
The tree and shrub planting program was recently established in 2009. This program allows Kennisis members to rehabilitate open or harvested areas, control erosion, create windbreaks, naturalize shorelines, or create wildlife surroundings. For this program, the KLCOA offers two classifications of trees (coniferous and deciduous trees) and two classifications of shrubs (shoreline and upland shrubs). Kennisis members can order the tree or shrub of their choosing.

The coniferous trees of the KLCOA include white pine (that grows 30–45 m tall), white spruce (30–45 m tall), and balsam fir (20–35 m tall). The deciduous trees consist of red oak (60–90 m tall), white birch (45–60 m tall), and sugar maple (60–90 m tall). The program also provides shoreline shrubs such as red osier dogwood (60–90 cm tall) and upland shrubs including staghorn sumac (30–45 cm tall).

Maintenance of the planted trees and shrubs involves controlling weeds or other competing species around the young plants and providing adequate watering in the event of summer drought conditions to help the plants establish.

=== Sailing ===
During the summer, the Ontario Sailing Association (OSA) runs a BOOM Sailing Program at Kennisis Lake. The program offers Kennisis resident members and non-members five days of lessons. This program includes in-water and in-class sessions teaching Kennisis members how to sail on the lake. The Ontario Sailing Association provides professional instructors for a limited class of sixteen students. The OSA also supplies instructional boats, teaching aids and lifejackets for all the participants. Although the summer program targets children ages nine to fifteen, the OSA offers an adult "learn to sail" program with a more limited number of participants.

=== Regatta ===
The annual Regatta is an all-day event that brings residents together to participate in games and activities. A marathon swim, horseshoe tournament, battleship golf, mini putt, Frisbee, morning swim races, water balloon toss, bubblegum blowing contest, afternoon boat races, egg tosses, log rolling contests, and more activities fill the day. Most activities compete for prizes, typically trophies named after generous donors. The major events include:

==== Marathon swim ====
All participants must be accompanied by a boat as they swim from the island to the Marina Property.

==== Morning swim ====
With the exception of boys six years old and under falling under one category, KLCOA categorizes boys in their own age together. All the boys compete against other boys approximately their own age. Similar to the boys morning swim competition, girls compete against other girls in their same age groups. In the morning swims that include girls and boys as one category have a wider ranged age group (for example, fourteen years and under, twelve and under, twelve and over, thirteen and over). For most of these gender integrated races, the participants are competing individually. The exception for these single races is the T-shirt relay. The relay allows four members per group.

The adults (starting from age seventeen and over) have age groups, but are more extensive than the children's age groups. Men have two age groups. One age group varies from ages seventeen to twenty-nine; the other, thirty year old and over. Kennisis also has an all-star swim race for the men. Women age groups are similar, but their younger age group starts at age nineteen. The women can also compete in their own all-star swim competition. The time when women can swim against men is in the age group of fifty-five and over for the Remax Cup.

==== Afternoon boat races ====
After the midday activities of water balloon tosses and bubble gum blowing contests, boat races load the afternoon with friendly competition. The usual boat races at Kennisis include:

- Pie Plate Race a race consisting of boats and canoes that are propelled by metal pie plates. This race often includes four participants per boat or canoe. They supply their own metal pie plates and create their own propeller.
- Paddle Boat Race
- Open Canoe Race a canoe race that only has one participant in each canoe.
- Kayak Race a race in which Kennisis divides the kayak races into separate age categories. One age group consists of both boys and girls sixteen years old and under. The other age group is made up of both men and women ages seventeen and older.
- Backwards Canoe Race a group race in which each group comprises two men and two women racing together in one canoe.
- In and Out Canoe Race a race n which each team involves two members racing in one canoe.
- Canoe Race a race that involves teams of four. Each team includes two male and two female participants. Like many of the races, the canoe race divides itself into two age groups. The youth race participants range from ages sixteen and under. The adult race has members starting from ages seventeen and over.
- Family Members Canoe Race a group race that involves members of the same family racing together as one unit.

== Water Quality ==
Kennisis Lake is located within the Canadian Shield, so it is among deep lakes containing few minerals. This is because of the erosion of granite in the lakes doesn't happen as much as it would elsewhere. There have been observations of a lack in clarity of the water, but this is not due to mineral or chemical buildup. The average measurement of phosphorus in the lake water is around 7 μg/L. However, deposits of dissolved organic carbon may affect the clarity of the water due to the lake acting as a watershed to nearby wetlands. Increased rainfall can cause sediment to get into the lake, also decreasing clarity. That being said, though, it is only a slight issue and is not a major problem to the water itself.

== Interesting Facts ==
The Kennisis Lake got its name from the early settlers who recorded the name of Joe Kennisis, a First Nations man, whose family had lived by hunting and fishing around the lake. By the 1880s, a four-foot dam was built where the Kennisis River flows out of the lake to provide a few weeks longer of sufficient water to float logs down to the mills. The First Nation in the Kennisis area gave up all rights to lands, along the Trent-Severn Waterway due to the Williams Treaty signed in 1923, between the federal government and the tribes of the land. Relics of these nations have been found in the areas of Haliburton where villages of the Hurons were established. In 1955, Hayward and Jones Ltd. of Peterborough obtained an option to buy the shoreline of Big and Little Kennisis from Hay and Co. Hence, the development of Big and Little Kennisis began in 1957 and 1962 respectively. After Hayward and Jones Ltd. sold its lot of land to the Kennisis Lake Development Ltd in 1963, three bridges, a hydro service, and a dam were developed.

== See also ==
- List of lakes in Ontario
