= List of airports in Canada (E–G) =

This is an list of all Nav Canada certified and registered water and land airports, aerodromes and heliports in the provinces and territories of Canada. The list is sorted alphabetically as shown in the Canada Flight Supplement (and the name as used by the airport if different) and airports names in italics are part of the National Airports System.

They are listed in the format:

- Airport name as listed by either the Canada Flight Supplement (CFS) or the airport authority, alternate name, International Civil Aviation Organization (ICAO) code, Transport Canada Location identifier (TC LID) International Air Transport Association (IATA) code, community and province.

== E ==
| Airport name | ICAO | TC LID | IATA | Community | Province or territory |
|---|---|---|---|---|---|
| Eagle River/Rifflin' Hitch Water Aerodrome | | CRH3 | | Cartwright (Eagle River) | Newfoundland and Labrador |
| Eaglesham/Bice Farm Aerodrome | | CBI2 | | Eaglesham | Alberta |
| Eaglesham/Codesa South Aerodrome | | CCP7 | | Eaglesham | Alberta |
| Eaglesham/Delta Tango Field Aerodrome | | CDT8 | | Eaglesham | Alberta |
| Eaglesham South Aerodrome | | CGL4 | | Eaglesham | Alberta |
| Ear Falls Aerodrome | | CDP2 | | Ear Falls | Ontario |
| Ear Falls Water Aerodrome | | CJE8 | | Ear Falls | Ontario |
| Earlton/McLean Heliport | | CCM2 | | Earlton | Ontario |
| Earlton (Timiskaming Regional) Airport | CYXR | | YXR | Earlton | Ontario |
| Easterville Airport | | CKM6 | | Easterville | Manitoba |
| East Gore Eco Airpark | | CCY4 | | East Gore | Nova Scotia |
| East Linton (Kerr Field) Aerodrome | | CEL3 | | East Linton | Ontario |
| Eastmain River Airport | CZEM | | ZEM | Eastmain | Quebec |
| Eatonia (Elvie Smith) Municipal Airport | | CJG2 | | Eatonia | Saskatchewan |
| Echo Valley Airport | | CBJ4 | | Echo Valley | British Columbia |
| Edam Airport | | CJU7 | | Edam | Saskatchewan |
| Edenvale Airport | | CNV8 | | Edenvale | Ontario |
| Edmonton/Bailey Heliport | | CBY2 | | Sherwood Park | Alberta |
| Edmonton/Calmar (Maplelane Farm) Aerodrome | | CMF2 | | Calmar | Alberta |
| Edmonton (City) Heliport | | CCE7 | | Edmonton | Alberta |
| Edmonton/Cooking Lake Airport | | CEZ3 | | South Cooking Lake | Alberta |
| Edmonton/Cooking Lake Water Aerodrome | | CEE7 | | South Cooking Lake | Alberta |
| Edmonton/Eastport Heliport | | CEP8 | | Sherwood Park | Alberta |
| Edmonton/Gartner Airport | | CFQ7 | | Edmonton Metropolitan Region | Alberta |
| Edmonton/Grey Nuns Community Hospital Heliport | | CES8 | | Edmonton | Alberta |
| Edmonton International Airport | CYEG | | YEG | Nisku | Alberta |
| Edmonton/Josephburg Aerodrome | | CFB6 | | Josephburg | Alberta |
| Edmonton/Kelsonae Heliport | | CSG6 | | Edmonton | Alberta |
| Edmonton/Misericordia (Community Hospital) Heliport | | CMC2 | | Edmonton | Alberta |
| Edmonton/Morinville (Currie Field) Aerodrome | | CCF6 | | Edmonton | Alberta |
| Edmonton/Morinville (Mike's Field) Aerodrome | | CMN6 | | Edmonton | Alberta |
| Edmonton/Namao Heliport (CFB Edmonton) | CYED | CYED | YED | Edmonton | Alberta |
| Edmonton Parkland Executive Airport | CYEP | | | Parkland County | Alberta |
| Edmonton (Royal Alexandra Hospital) Heliport | | CFH7 | | Edmonton | Alberta |
| Edmonton/St. Albert (Delta Helicopters) Heliport | | CES3 | | St. Albert | Alberta |
| Edmonton/Sturgeon Community Hospital Heliport | | CSA3 | | Edmonton | Alberta |
| Edmonton/Twin Island Airpark | | CEE6 | | Half Moon Lake | Alberta |
| Edmonton/University of Alberta (Stollery Children's Hospital MAHI) Heliport | | CEW7 | | Edmonton | Alberta |
| Edmonton/Villeneuve Airport (Villeneuve Airport) | CZVL | CZVL | | Villeneuve | Alberta |
| Edmonton/Villeneuve (Rose Field) Aerodrome | | CRF3 | | Villeneuve | Alberta |
| Edmundston Airport | CYES | | | Edmundston | New Brunswick |
| Edmundston (Madawaska River) Water Aerodrome | | CMA8 | | Edmundston (Madawaska River) | New Brunswick |
| Edra Airport | | CEV2 | | Edra | Alberta |
| Edson Airport | CYET | | YET | Edson | Alberta |
| Ekati Airport | CYOA | | YOA | Ekati Diamond Mine | Northwest Territories |
| Éléonore Aerodrome | | CEL8 | | Opinaca Reservoir | Quebec |
| Elkford Heliport | | CEH7 | | Elkford | British Columbia |
| Elkin Creek Guest Ranch Airport | | CBL9 | | Elkin Creek Guest Ranch | British Columbia |
| Elk Island Airport | | CKZ3 | | Elk Island | Manitoba |
| Elk Lake Water Aerodrome | | CNV5 | | Elk Lake | Ontario |
| Elko/Lionel P. Demers Memorial Airpark | | CBE2 | | Elko | British Columbia |
| Elk Point Airport | | CEJ6 | | Elk Point | Alberta |
| Elk Point (Healthcare Centre) Heliport | | CEP7 | | Elk Point | Alberta |
| Elliot Lake Municipal Airport | CYEL | | YEL | Elliot Lake | Ontario |
| Elliot Lake Water Aerodrome | | CGB5 | | Elliot Lake | Ontario |
| Elmira Airport | | CNT6 | | Elmira | Ontario |
| Elora Aerodrome | | CDF5 | | Elora | Ontario |
| Elstow/Combine World Field Aerodrome | | CEW2 | | Elstow | Saskatchewan |
| Empress Airport | CYEA | | | Empress | Alberta |
| Emsdale Airport | | CNA4 | | Emsdale | Ontario |
| Englehart (Dave's Field) Aerodrome | | CDF3 | | Englehart | Ontario |
| Englehart (District Hospital) Heliport | | CNS3 | | Englehart | Ontario |
| Erickson Municipal Airport | | CKQ6 | | Erickson | Manitoba |
| Erik Nielsen Whitehorse International Airport | | CYXY | YXY | Whitehorse | Yukon |
| Essex Airport | | CNE9 | | Essex | Ontario |
| Essex/Billing Airstrip | | CEB8 | | Essex | Ontario |
| Esterhazy Airport | | CJK4 | | Esterhazy | Saskatchewan |
| Estevan (Blue Sky) Aerodrome | | CBS2 | | Estevan | Saskatchewan |
| Estevan Regional Aerodrome | CYEN | | YEN | Estevan | Saskatchewan |
| Estevan (St. Josephs's Hospital) Heliport | | CSJ3 | | Estevan | Saskatchewan |
| Eston Airport | | CJR4 | | Eston | Saskatchewan |
| Ethel Airport | | CPD2 | | Ethel | Ontario |
| Eureka Aerodrome | CYEU | | YEU | Eureka | Nunavut |
| Exploits Valley (Botwood) Airport | | CCP2 | | Botwood | Newfoundland and Labrador |
| Eye Hill Municipal Airport (Macklin Aerodrome) | | CJJ8 | | Macklin | Saskatchewan |

== F ==
| Airport name | ICAO | TC LID | IATA | Community | Province or territory |
|---|---|---|---|---|---|
| Fairmont Hot Springs Airport | CYCZ | | YCZ | Fairmont Hot Springs | British Columbia |
| Fairview Airport | | CEB5 | | Fairview | Alberta |
| Fall River Water Aerodrome | | CFR3 | | Fall River | Nova Scotia |
| Farnham Airport | | CSN7 | | Farnham | Quebec |
| Faro Airport | CZFA | | ZFA | Faro | Yukon |
| Fenelon Falls/Sturgeon Lake Water Aerodrome | | CFG8 | | Sturgeon Lake | Ontario |
| Fergus (Groves Memorial Community Hospital) Heliport | | CPB2 | | Fergus | Ontario |
| Fergus (Holyoake Airfield) Aerodrome | | CPY9 | | Fergus | Ontario |
| Fergus (Juergensen Field) Airport | | CPG7 | | Fergus | Ontario |
| Fergus (Vodarek Field) Aerodrome | | CVF2 | | Fergus | Ontario |
| Fermont Heliport | | CSD5 | | Fermont | Quebec |
| Fernie (Elk Valley Hospital) Heliport | | CBP3 | | Fernie | British Columbia |
| Fillmore Airport | | CKN5 | | Fillmore | Saskatchewan |
| Finlay Air Park | | CDH3 | | Finlay | Nova Scotia |
| Finlayson Lake Airport | | CFT3 | | Ross River | Yukon |
| Fisher Branch Airport | | CKX4 | | Fisher Branch | Manitoba |
| Flamboro Centre Aerodrome | | CFC8 | | Flamborough | Ontario |
| Flesherton (Smithorrs Field) Aerodrome | | CFL4 | | Flesherton | Ontario |
| Flin Flon Airport | CYFO | | YFO | Flin Flon | Manitoba |
| Flin Flon/Bakers Narrows Water Aerodrome | | CFF8 | | Bakers Narrows | Manitoba |
| Flin Flon/Channing Water Aerodrome | | CJK8 | | Flin Flon | Manitoba |
| Florenceville Airport | | CCR3 | | Florenceville-Bristol | New Brunswick |
| Fogo Aerodrome | | CDY3 | | Fogo | Newfoundland and Labrador |
| Fond-du-Lac Airport | CZFD | | ZFD | Fond du Lac Denesuline First Nation | Saskatchewan |
| Fontages Airport | | CTU2 | | Fontanges | Quebec |
| Foot's Bay Water Aerodrome | | CFB8 | | Foot's Bay | Ontario |
| Foothills Regional Aerodrome | | CEN4 | | High River | Alberta |
| Ford Bay Airport | | CBC2 | | Ford Bay, Great Bear Lake | Northwest Territories |
| Ford Bay Water Aerodrome | | CEL7 | | Ford Bay, Great Bear Lake | Northwest Territories |
| Fordwich Airport | | CPH9 | | Fordwich | Ontario |
| Foremost Airport | | CFD4 | | Foremost | Alberta |
| Forestville Airport | CYFE | | YFE | Forestville | Quebec |
| Fort Albany Airport | CYFA | | YFA | Fort Albany First Nation | Ontario |
| Fort Chipewyan Airport | CYPY | | YPY | Fort Chipewyan | Alberta |
| Fort Erie (Airbus Helicopters Canada Ltd) Heliport | | CPG3 | | Fort Erie | Ontario |
| Fort Frances Municipal Airport | CYAG | | YAG | Fort Frances | Ontario |
| Fort Frances Water Aerodrome | | CJM8 | | Fort Frances | Ontario |
| Fort Good Hope Airport | CYGH | | YGH | Fort Good Hope | Northwest Territories |
| Fort Grahame Airport | | CBW3 | | Fort Grahame | British Columbia |
| Fort Hope Airport | CYFH | | YFH | Eabametoong First Nation | Ontario |
| Fort Langley Airport | | CBQ2 | | Fort Langley | British Columbia |
| Fort Langley Water Aerodrome | | CAS4 | | Fort Langley | British Columbia |
| Fort Liard Airport | CYJF | | YJF | Fort Liard | Northwest Territories |
| Fort MacKay/Albian Aerodrome | | CAL4 | | Fort McKay | Alberta |
| Fort MacKay/Firebag Aerodrome | CYFI | | YFI | Fort McKay | Alberta |
| Fort MacKay/Horizon Airport | CYNR | | | Fort McKay | Alberta |
| Fort Macleod Airport (RCAF Station Fort Macleod) | | CEY3 | | Fort Macleod | Alberta |
| Fort Macleod (Alcock Farm) Airport | | CFM8 | | Fort Macleod | Alberta |
| Fort Macleod (Hospital) Heliport | | CFM9 | | Fort Macleod | Alberta |
| Fort McMurray International Airport | CYMM | | YMM | Fort McMurray | Alberta |
| Fort McMurray (Legend) Aerodrome | | CLG7 | | Fort McMurray | Alberta |
| Fort McMurray/Northern Lights Regional Health Centre Heliport | | CNO9 | | Fort McMurray | Alberta |
| Fort McMurray (North Liege) Aerodrome | | CNL2 | | Fort McMurray | Alberta |
| Fort McMurray (South Liege) Aerodrome | | CLS3 | | Fort McMurray | Alberta |
| Fort McMurray Water Aerodrome | | CES7 | | Fort McMurray | Alberta |
| Fort McPherson Airport | CZFM | | ZFM | Fort McPherson | Northwest Territories |
| Fort Nelson Airport | CYYE | | YYE | Fort Nelson | British Columbia |
| Fort Nelson/Gordon Field Airport | | CBL3 | | Fort Nelson | British Columbia |
| Fort Nelson (Parker Lake) Water Aerodrome | | CER9 | | Fort Nelson | British Columbia |
| Fort Providence Airport | CYJP | | | Fort Providence | Northwest Territories |
| Fort Qu'Appelle (All Nations Healing Hospital) Heliport | | CFQ2 | | Fort Qu'Appelle | Saskatchewan |
| Fort Reliance Water Aerodrome | | CJN8 | | Fort Reliance | Northwest Territories |
| Fort Resolution Airport | CYFR | | YFR | Fort Resolution | Northwest Territories |
| Fort St. James (Perison) Airport | CYJM | | YJM | Fort St. James | British Columbia |
| Fort St. James (Stuart Lake Hospital) Heliport | | CFJ2 | | Fort St. James | British Columbia |
| Fort St. James/Stuart River Water Aerodrome | | CAZ6 | | Fort St. James | British Columbia |
| Fort St. John Airport (North Peace Airport) | CYXJ | | YXJ | Fort St. John | British Columbia |
| Fort Saskatchewan (Community Hospital) Heliport | | CSV4 | | Fort Saskatchewan | Alberta |
| Fort Selkirk Aerodrome | | CFS3 | | Fort Selkirk | Yukon |
| Fort Severn Airport | CYER | | YER | Fort Severn First Nation | Ontario |
| Fort Simpson Airport | CYFS | | YFS | Fort Simpson | Northwest Territories |
| Fort Simpson (Great Slave No. 1) Heliport | | CFS2 | | Fort Simpson | Northwest Territories |
| Fort Simpson (Great Slave No. 2) Heliport | | CFD8 | | Fort Simpson | Northwest Territories |
| Fort Simpson Island Airport | | CET4 | | Fort Simpson | Northwest Territories |
| Fort Simpson Island Water Aerodrome | | CEZ7 | | Fort Simpson | Northwest Territories |
| Fort Smith Airport | CYSM | | YSM | Fort Smith | Northwest Territories |
| Fort Smith (District) Heliport | | CEC5 | | Fort Smith | Northwest Territories |
| Fort Vermilion/Country Gardens B&B Heliport | | CKV9 | | Fort Vermilion | Alberta |
| Fort Vermilion (Wop May Memorial) Aerodrome | | CEZ4 | | Fort Vermilion | Alberta |
| Fort Ware Airport | | CAJ9 | | Kwadacha | British Columbia |
| Fort Ware Water Aerodrome | | CAW6 | | Kwadacha | British Columbia |
| Fox Creek Airport | | CED4 | | Fox Creek | Alberta |
| Fox Harbour Airport | | CFH4 | | Fox Harbour | Nova Scotia |
| Fox Lake Airport | | CEC3 | | Fox Lake | Alberta |
| Frank Channel (Forestry) Heliport | | CFB2 | | Frank Channel | Northwest Territories |
| Fraser Lake Airport | | CBZ9 | | Fraser Lake | British Columbia |
| Fraser Lake Water Aerodrome | | CBJ8 | | Fraser Lake | British Columbia |
| Fraserwood/Tribble Ranch Field Aerodrome | | CTR8 | | Fraserwood | Manitoba |
| Fredericton International Airport (Greater Fredericton International Airport) | CYFC | | YFC | Fredericton | New Brunswick |
| Fredericton (RCMP) Heliport | | CRC2 | | Fredericton | New Brunswick |
| French River/Alban Aerodrome | | CFR5 | | Alban | Ontario |
| Frontier Airport | | CJM5 | | Frontier | Saskatchewan |
| Fullerton/Monro Aerodrome | | CMR3 | | Fullarton | Ontario |

== G ==
| Airport name | ICAO | TC LID | IATA | Community | Province or territory |
|---|---|---|---|---|---|
| Gagetown Heliport (CFB Gagetown) | CYCX | | YCX | Oromocto | New Brunswick |
| Gahcho Kue Aerodrome | | CGK2 | | Gahcho Kue Diamond Mine | Northwest Territories |
| Galore Creek Heliport | | CGC2 | | Galore Creek mine | British Columbia |
| Gamètì/Rae Lakes Airport | CYRA | | YRA | Gamèti | Northwest Territories |
| Gananoque Airport | | CNN8 | | Gananoque | Ontario |
| Gander International Airport | CYQX | | YQX | Gander | Newfoundland and Labrador |
| Gander (James Paton Memorial Regional Health Centre) Heliport | | CGH2 | | Gander | Newfoundland and Labrador |
| Ganges (Lady Minto/Gulf Islands Hospital) Heliport | | CAL7 | | Ganges | British Columbia |
| Ganges Water Aerodrome | | CAX6 | YGG | Ganges | British Columbia |
| Ganonoque Heliport | | CGN4 | | Gananoque | Ontario |
| Ganonoque/Signature Stables Heliport | | CGS3 | | Gananoque | Ontario |
| Garden Bay/Sakinaw Lake South Water Aerodrome | | CAS8 | | Agamemnon Channel | British Columbia |
| Garden River Airport | | CFU4 | | Garden River | Alberta |
| Gaspé (Michel-Pouliot) Airport (Michel-Pouliot Gaspé Airport) | CYGP | | YGP | Gaspé | Quebec |
| Gatineau-Ottawa Executive Airport (Ottawa/Gatineau Airport) | CYND | | YND | Gatineau | Quebec |
| George Lake Aerodrome | | CGR3 | | George Lake | Nunavut |
| Georgetown (Georgetown & District Hospital) Heliport | | CNZ6 | | Georgetown | Ontario |
| Geraldton (District Hospital) Heliport | | CPJ4 | | Geraldton | Ontario |
| Geraldton (Greenstone Regional) Airport | CYGQ | | YGQ | Geraldton | Ontario |
| Gilford Aerodrome | | CGF6 | | Gilford | Ontario |
| Gilford Island/Echo Bay Water Aerodrome | | CAA7 | | Gilford Island | British Columbia |
| Gilford Island/Health Bay Water Aerodrome | | CAD7 | | Gilford Island | British Columbia |
| Gillam Airport | CYGX | | YGX | Gillam | Manitoba |
| Gillam Water Aerodrome | | CJP8 | | Gillam | Manitoba |
| Gimli Industrial Park Airport | CYGM | | YGM | Gimli | Manitoba |
| Gjoa Haven Airport | CYHK | | YHK | Gjoa Haven | Nunavut |
| Gladstone Aerodrome | | CJR5 | | Gladstone | Manitoba |
| Glaslyn Airport | | CJE5 | | Glaslyn | Saskatchewan |
| Glenboro Airport | | CJJ2 | | Glenboro | Manitoba |
| Glenwood Aerodrome | | CGW2 | | Glenwood | Alberta |
| Goderich Airport | CYGD | | YGD | Goderich | Ontario |
| Gods Lake Airport | | CJB6 | | Gods Lake | Manitoba |
| Gods Lake Narrows Airport | CYGO | | YGO | Gods Lake Narrows | Manitoba |
| Gods River Airport | CZGI | | ZGI | Manto Sipi Cree Nation | Manitoba |
| Golden Airport | CYGE | | YGE | Golden | British Columbia |
| Golden (Golden & District General Hospital) Heliport | | CBT5 | | Golden | British Columbia |
| Gold River (49 North Helicopters) Heliport | | CGR2 | | Gold River | British Columbia |
| Gold River (The Ridge) Heliport | | CGR4 | | Gold River | British Columbia |
| Gold River Water Aerodrome | | CAU6 | | Gold River | British Columbia |
| Gooderham/Pencil Lake Water Aerodrome | | CNN7 | | Gooderham | Ontario |
| Goodsoil Airport | | CKF4 | | Goodsoil | Saskatchewan |
| Goose Bay Airport (CFB Goose Bay) | CYYR | | YYR | Happy Valley-Goose Bay | Newfoundland and Labrador |
| Goose Lake Aerodrome | | CGS2 | | Goose Lake | Nunavut |
| Goose (Otter Creek) Water Aerodrome | | CCB5 | | Happy Valley-Goose Bay | Newfoundland and Labrador |
| Gordon Lake Airport | | CFW2 | | Gordon Lake | Alberta |
| Gore Bay-Manitoulin Airport | CYZE | | YZE | Gore Bay | Ontario |
| Graham Lake (Yellow Dog Lodge) Water Aerodrome | | CYD2 | | Graham Lake | Northwest Territories |
| Granby/Artopex Plus Heliport | | CTR4 | | Granby | Quebec |
| Grand Bend Airport (RCAF Detachment Grand Bend) | | CPL4 | | Grand Bend | Ontario |
| Grande Airport | | CFA5 | | Grande | Alberta |
| Grande Cache (Community Health Complex) Heliport | | CGC3 | | Grande Cache | Alberta |
| Grande Prairie Airport | CYQU | | YQU | Grande Prairie | Alberta |
| Grande Prairie Regional Hospital Heliport | | CGP4 | | Grande Prairie | Alberta |
| Grand Etang Pubnico Water Aerodrome | | CGE2 | | Lower West Pubnico | Nova Scotia |
| Grand Falls Airport | | CCK3 | | Grand Falls | New Brunswick |
| Grand Falls-Windsor Heliport | | CFW8 | | Grand Falls-Windsor | Newfoundland and Labrador |
| Grand Forks Airport | CZGF | | ZGF | Grand Forks | British Columbia |
| Grand Forks (Boundary Hospital) Heliport | | CGF4 | | Grand Forks | British Columbia |
| Grand Manan Airport | | CCN2 | | Grand Manan | New Brunswick |
| Grand Rapids Aerodrome | | CJV8 | | Grand Rapids | Manitoba |
| Grand River Executive Airport | | CPP6 | | York | Ontario |
| Grand Valley (Black Field) Aerodrome | | CGV5 | | Grand Valley | Ontario |
| Grand Valley/Luther Field Aerodrome | | CGV2 | | Grand Valley | Ontario |
| Grand Valley (Martin Field) Aerodrome | | CGV6 | | Grand Valley | Ontario |
| Grand Valley North Aerodrome | | CGV3 | | Grand Valley | Ontario |
| Granitehill Lake Water Aerodrome | | CND6 | | Hornepayne | Ontario |
| Gravelbourg Airport | | CJM4 | | Gravelbourg | Saskatchewan |
| Gravenhurst (Downtown) Water Aerodrome | | CGR6 | | Gravenhurst | Ontario |
| Gravenhurst (Morrison Lake) Water Aerodrome | | CML4 | | Gravenhurst | Ontario |
| Gravenhurst/Muskoka Bay Water Aerodrome | CYN6 | | | Gravenhurst | Ontario |
| Gravenhurst (Pr Muskoka) Water Aerodrome | | CGV4 | | Gravenhurst | Ontario |
| Gravenhurst/Sniders Bay Water Aerodrome | | CMC8 | | Gravenhurst | Ontario |
| Great Bear Lake Airport | | CFF4 | DAS | Great Bear Lake | Northwest Territories |
| Great Bear Lake Water Aerodrome | | CES9 | | Great Bear Lake | Northwest Territories |
| Greenbank Airport | | CNP8 | | Greenbank | Ontario |
| Green Lake Aerodrome | | CBG2 | | Green Lake | British Columbia |
| Green Lake Water Aerodrome | | CBY6 | | Green Lake | British Columbia |
| Greenwood Airport (CFB Greenwood) | CYZX | | YZX | Greenwood | Nova Scotia |
| Grenfell Airport | | CKU6 | | Grenfell | Saskatchewan |
| Grimsby Regional Airport | | CNZ8 | | Grimsby | Ontario |
| Grimshaw Airport | | CFD5 | | Grimshaw | Alberta |
| Grise Fiord Airport | CYGZ | | YGZ | Grise Fiord | Nunavut |
| Grovedale Fire Hall Heliport | | CGR8 | | Grovedale | Alberta |
| Guelph Airpark | | CNC4 | | Guelph | Ontario |
| Gull Lake Airport | | CJK5 | | Gull Lake | Saskatchewan |
| Gunisao Lake Airport | | CJK2 | | Gunisao Lake | Manitoba |
| Gunisao Lake Water Aerodrome | | CJW8 | | Gunisao Lake | Manitoba |
| Gun Lake Heliport | | CGL5 | | Gun Lakes | British Columbia |
