= RAF Station De Winton =

- De Winton, Alberta in Canada

Site information
- Operator: Formerly Royal Canadian Air Force

Location
- Location within Alberta
- Coordinates: 50.8212°N 113.82368°W

Airfield information
- Identifiers: IATA: none, ICAO: none
- Elevation: 3325' AMSL
Runways
Direction	Length and surface
16/34	3,100 feet (945 m) Hard Surfaced
04/22	3,000 feet (914 m) Hard Surfaced
10/28	3,200 feet (975 m) Hard Surfaced

RAF Station De Winton was a World War II air training station located south of Calgary, and east of De Winton, Alberta, Canada. The Royal Air Force (RAF) established No. 31 Elementary Flying Training School (31 EFTS) at the station. Like other RAF stations in Canada, it was subject to RCAF administrative and operational control.

The aerodrome was completed in 1940 and No. 31 EFTS began operating in June 1941. In 1942, the school formally became part of the British Commonwealth Air Training Plan. It was a civilian operation with instructors from the Toronto Flying Club who originally instructed at No. 1 Elementary Flying Training School at Malton, Ontario. Aircraft flown at De Winton include Boeing Stearmans, de Havilland Tiger Moth, and Fairchild Cornells.

De Winton was closed in September 1944 and is now the privately operated De Winton/South Calgary Airport.

Although the runways and some concrete structures from the airbase remain, the airfield is no longer active for fixed wing use. Some helicopter training, such as auto-rotation and hover practice, is still performed at the airfield, but all flights originate from other airports. Two of the runways are in disrepair and overgrown with grass, while the third runway and tarmac only partially maintained for use as an automotive driver training area.

== Aerodrome Information ==
The airfield was constructed in a typical BCATP wartime pattern, with three runways formed in a triangle. In approximately 1942 the aerodrome was listed at 50°49′N 113°50′W with a Var. 24 degrees E and elevation of 3,325 feet (1,013 m). Three runways were listed as follows:

Runway Name	Length	Width	Surface
16/34	3,100 feet (945 m)	150 feet (46 m)	Hard surfaced
4/22	3,000 feet (914 m)	150 feet (46 m)	Hard surfaced
10/28	3,200 feet (975 m)	150 feet (46 m)	Hard surfaced
