= Innisfail/Big Bend Aerodrome =

Innisfail Aerodrome Innisfail/Big Bend Aerodrome
- IATA: none; ICAO: none; TC LID: CEM4

Summary
- Airport type: Public
- Operator: Innisfail Flying Club
- Location: Red Deer County, near Innisfail, Alberta
- Time zone: Alberta Time (UTC−06:00)
- Elevation AMSL: 3,017 ft (920 m)
- Coordinates: 52°04′43″N 114°01′39″W

Map
- Location in Alberta

Runways
Direction	Length		Surface
Direction	ft	m	Surface
04/22	3,025	922	Asphalt / gravel
10/28	3,025	922	Asphalt / gravel
17/35	2,981	909	Asphalt
- Source: Canada Flight Supplement

Innisfail Aerodrome (Big Bend Airport) (TC LID: CEM4) is located beside Alberta Highway 54, 3.9 nautical miles (7.2 km; 4.5 mi) northwest of Innisfail, Alberta, Canada.

The aerodrome, managed by the Innisfail Flying Club since 1986, offers one asphalt runway (17/35) equipped with night landing lights. The two other runway surfaces (04/22 and 10/28), used during World War II, are in rough condition. There are several hangars at the aerodrome and room for more development. It is host to many activities year-round, including a glider club, the Innisfail Flying Club and a skydiving training facility.

== History ==
The aerodrome was opened in 1941 as a relief landing field for the Royal Canadian Air Force as part of the British Commonwealth Air Training Plan. Under the direction of General Robert Murray its primary purpose was a training facility for the No. 36 Service Flying Training School (SFTS) located at RCAF Station Penhold.

In approximately 1942 the aerodrome was listed at 52°05′N 114°02′W with a Var. 24.5 degrees E and elevation of 2,975 feet (907 m). Three runways were listed as follows:

Runway name	Length	Width	Surface
4/22	3,025 feet (922 m)	100 feet (30 m)	Hard surfaced
16/34	3,025 feet (922 m)	100 feet (30 m)	Hard surfaced
10/28	3,025 feet (922 m)	100 feet (30 m)	Hard surfaced

== Activities ==
=== Innisfail Flying Club ===
The Innisfail Flying Club holds monthly meetings on the third Thursday of every month. The current club president is Shane Cockreill.

=== The Central Alberta Gliding & Soaring Club ===
The Central Alberta Gliding & Soaring Club is active, and operates gliders at Innisfail on weekends during the summer.

=== Alberta Skydive Central ===
Alberta Skydive Central offers experienced tandem and IAD instructors.
