= List of airports in Canada (R–S) =

This is an list of all Nav Canada certified and registered water and land airports, aerodromes and heliports in the provinces and territories of Canada. The list is sorted alphabetically as shown in the Canada Flight Supplement (and the name as used by the airport if different) and airports names in italics are part of the National Airports System.

They are listed in the format:

- Airport name as listed by either the Canada Flight Supplement (CFS) or the airport authority, alternate name, International Civil Aviation Organization (ICAO) code, Transport Canada Location identifier (TC LID) International Air Transport Association (IATA) code, community and province.

== R ==
Airport name	ICAO	TC LID	IATA	Community	Province or territory
Radium Hot Springs Airport		CBL6		Radium Hot Springs	British Columbia
Radville Airport		CKF2		Radville	Saskatchewan
Rae/Edzo Airport		CRE2		Behchokǫ̀	Northwest Territories
Rainbow Lake Airport	CYOP			Rainbow Lake	Alberta
Rainy River Water Aerodrome		CKQ4		Rainy River	Ontario
Rankin Inlet Airport	CYRT		YRT	Rankin Inlet	Nunavut
Rawdon/Camping Pontbriand (Hydro) Water Aerodrome		CCP5		Rawdon	Quebec
Red Deer/Allan Dale Residence Heliport		CAD2		Red Deer	Alberta
Red Deer/Allan Dale Trailers & RV Heliport		CAD3		Red Deer	Alberta
Red Deer/Chong Residence Heliport		CRE5		Red Deer	Alberta
Red Deer Forestry Airport		CFR7		Sundre	Alberta
Red Deer/Leblanc Heliport		CLB5		Red Deer	Alberta
Red Deer Regional Airport	CYQF		YQF	Red Deer	Alberta
Red Deer Regional Hospital Centre Heliport		CRD3		Red Deer	Alberta
Red Deer/Truant Aerodrome		CRD5		Red Deer	Alberta
Red Deer/Truant South Aerodrome		CRD6		Red Deer	Alberta
Red Earth Creek Airport		CEH5		Red Earth Creek	Alberta
Red Lake Airport	CYRL		YRL	Red Lake	Ontario
Red Lake (Howey Bay) Water Aerodrome		CKS4		Red Lake	Ontario
Red Lake (Margaret Cochenour Memorial Hospital) Heliport		CRL3		Red Lake	Ontario
Rednersville/Aery Aerodrome		CRA3		Rednersville	Ontario
Red Sucker Lake Airport	CYRS		YRS	Red Sucker Lake	Manitoba
Red Sucker Lake Water Aerodrome		CKT4		Red Sucker Lake	Manitoba
Redwater (Health Centre) Heliport		CRW8		Redwater	Alberta
Redwater (Heliworks) Heliport		CRW2		Redwater	Alberta
Redwater (Pembina) Heliport		CRP3		Redwater	Alberta
Regina/Aerogate Aerodrome		CAG2		Regina	Saskatchewan
Regina Beach Airport		CKL9		Regina Beach	Saskatchewan
Regina General Hospital Heliport		CRQ2		Regina	Saskatchewan
Regina International Airport	CYQR		YQR	Regina	Saskatchewan
Region of Waterloo International Airport (Kitchener/Waterloo Regional Airport)	CYKF		YKF	Regional Municipality of Waterloo	Ontario
Reindeer Lake Aerodrome		CRL7		Reindeer Lake	Saskatchewan
Renard Aerodrome		CFX5		Renard diamond mine	Quebec
Renfrew/Black Donald Lake Water Aerodrome		CPK8		Renfrew	Ontario
Renfrew/Hurds Lake Water Aerodrome		CNL6		Renfrew	Ontario
Renfrew (Victoria Hospital) Heliport		CPG9		Renfrew	Ontario
Réservoir Gouin\Pourvoirie Escapade Aerodrome		CGN2		Réservoir Gouin	Quebec
Réservoir Gouin/Pourvoirie Escapade Water Aerodrome		CGN5		Réservoir Gouin (Obedjiwan)	Quebec
Réservoir Kiamika (Pourvoirie Cécaurel) Water Aerodrome		CRK3		Réservoir Kiamika (Sainte-Véronique)	Quebec
Resolute Bay Airport	CYRB		YRB	Resolute	Nunavut
Reston/R.M. of Pipestone Airport		CRP2		Pipestone	Manitoba
Revelstoke (Queen Victoria Hospital) Heliport		CQV3		Revelstoke	British Columbia
Rideau Valley Air Park (Kars/Rideau Valley Air Park)		CPL3		Kars	Ontario
Riding Mountain Airport		CRM2		Riding Mountain House (Riding Mountain National Park)	Manitoba
Rigolet Airport		CCZ2	YRG	Rigolet	Newfoundland and Labrador
Rimbey Airport		CFC7		Rimbey	Alberta
Rimbey (Hospital & Care Centre) Heliport		CRH5		Rimbey	Alberta
Rimouski Aerodrome	CYXK		YXK	Rimouski	Quebec
Rivers Inlet Water Aerodrome		CAU8	YRN	Rivers Inlet	British Columbia
Riverton Airport		CKG2		Riverton	Manitoba
Rivière-aux-Saumons Aerodrome		CTH7		Rivière-aux-Saumons	Quebec
Rivière Bell Aerodrome		CRB5		Rivière Bell	Quebec
Rivière Blanche/Cardinal Aviation Water Aerodrome		CRB7		Gatineau	Quebec
Rivière Bonnard Airport		CRB4		Mont-Valin	Quebec
Rivière-du-Loup Airport	CYRI		YRI	Rivière-du-Loup	Quebec
Rivière-du-Loup Heliport		CSS2		Rivière-du-Loup	Quebec
Roberval Airport	CYRJ		YRJ	Roberval	Quebec
Roblin Airport		CKB7		Roblin	Manitoba
Rockcliffe Airport (Ottawa/Rockcliffe Airport)	CYRO		YRO	Ottawa	Ontario
Rockglen Airport		CKC7		Rockglen	Saskatchewan
Rockton Airport		CPT3		Rockton	Ontario
Rockton (Onward Aviation Private) Heliport		CRO2		Rockton	Ontario
Rockyford Airport		CFC6		Rockyford	Alberta
Rockyford/Early Bird Air Aerodrome		CEB4		Rockyford	Alberta
Rocky Mountain House Airport	CYRM		YRM	Rocky Mountain House	Alberta
Rocky Mountain House (Health Centre) Heliport		CEU4		Rocky Mountain House	Alberta
Rodney/Pinder Airfield		CPN2		Rodney	Ontario
Roland-Désourdy Airport (Bromont (Roland Désourdy) Airport)	CZBM		ZBM	Bromont	Quebec
Roland (Graham Field) Airport		CKD7		Roland	Manitoba
Roseneath/Lilac Lodge Water Aerodrome		CLL5		Roseneath	Ontario
Rosenort Airport		CKJ2		Rosenort	Manitoba
Rosetown Airport		CJX4		Rosetown	Saskatchewan
Ross Creek Aerodrome		CRC3		Ross Creek	British Columbia
Rosseau Aerodrome		CRS4		Rosseau	Ontario
Ross River Airport	CYDM		XRR	Ross River	Yukon
Rougemont Aerodrome		CTY5		Rougemont	Quebec
Round Lake (Weagamow Lake) Airport	CZRJ		ZRJ	North Caribou Lake First Nation	Ontario
Round Lake (Weagamow Lake) Water Aerodrome		CKP6		North Caribou Lake First Nation (Weagamow Lake	Ontario
Rouyn-Noranda Airport	CYUY		YUY	Rouyn-Noranda	Quebec
Russell Airport		CJW5		Russell	Manitoba

== S ==
Airport name	ICAO	TC LID	IATA	Community	Province or territory
Sable Island Aerodrome		CSB2		Sable Island	Nova Scotia
Sable Island Heliport		CST5		Sable Island	Nova Scotia
Sachigo Lake Airport	CZPB		ZPB	Sachigo Lake First Nation	Ontario
Sachs Harbour (David Nasogaluak Jr. Saaryuaq) Airport	CYSY		YSY	Sachs Harbour	Northwest Territories
Sagard Heliport		CSG9		Sagard	Quebec
Saguenay (Harvey) Water Aerodrome		CSA8		Saguenay	Quebec
Saguenay/Oligny Heliport		COL5		Saguenay	Quebec
Saguenay/Saint-Charles-de-Bourget Water Aerodrome		CSA5		Saint-Charles-de-Bourget	Quebec
Saintfield/Stone Aerodrome		CST4		Saintfield	Ontario
Saint John Airport	CYSJ		YSJ	Saint John	New Brunswick
Saint John (Regional Hospital) Heliport		CSN6		Saint John	New Brunswick
Sainte-Agathe (AIM) Heliport		CSV2		Sainte-Agathe-des-Monts	Quebec
Saint-Alphonse/Lac Cloutier Water Aerodrome		CTC2		Saint-Alphonse-de-Granby	Quebec
Saint-André-Avellin Aerodrome		CAA2		Saint-André-Avellin	Quebec
St. Andrews Airport (Winnipeg/St. Andrews Airport)	CYAV			St. Andrews	Manitoba
St. Andrews (Codroy Valley) Airport		CDA5		St. Andrew's	Newfoundland and Labrador
Ste-Anne (Hospital) Heliport		CHS6		Ste. Anne	Manitoba
Sainte-Anne-des-Monts Aerodrome	CYSZ			Sainte-Anne-des-Monts	Quebec
Sainte-Anne-du-Lac (Aviation PLMG Inc.) Aerodrome		CAL8		Sainte-Anne-du-Lac	Quebec
Sainte-Anne-du-Lac Water Aerodrome		CSP9		Sainte-Anne-du-Lac	Quebec
St. Anthony Airport	CYAY		YAY	St. Anthony	Newfoundland and Labrador
Saint-Apollinaire (Airpro) Aerodrome		CAA4		Saint-Apollinaire	Quebec
Saint-Augustin Airport	CYIF		YIF	Saint-Augustin	Quebec
Saint-Augustin Heliport		CTH9		Saint-Augustin	Quebec
Sainte-Barbe Heliport		CBB8		Sainte-Barbe	Quebec
Saint-Basile (Marcotte) Aerodrome		CTR6		Saint-Basile	Quebec
St. Brieux Airport		CKK2		St. Brieux	Saskatchewan
Saint-Bruno-de-Guigues Aerodrome		CTA4		Saint-Bruno-de-Guigues	Quebec
St. Catharines/Niagara District Airport	CYSN		YCM	St. Catharines	Ontario
St. Catharines (Niagara Health System) Heliport		CNH4		St. Catharines	Ontario
Saint-Cuthbert (Ulm Québec) Aerodrome		CCU2		Saint-Cuthbert	Quebec
Saint-Dominique Aerodrome		CSS4		Saint-Dominique	Quebec
Saint-Donat Aerodrome		CSY4		Saint-Donat	Quebec
Saint-Esprit Aerodrome		CES2		Saint-Esprit	Quebec
Saint-Étienne-des-Grès/Hydravion Adventure Water Aerodrome		CHA2		Saint-Boniface	Quebec
Saint-Ferdinand Aerodrome		CSH5		Saint-Ferdinand	Quebec
St. François Xavier Airport		CKA8		St. François Xavier	Manitoba
Saint-Frédéric Aerodrome		CSZ4		Saint-Frédéric	Quebec
Saint-Georges Aerodrome	CYSG			Saint-Georges	Quebec
Saint-Hyacinthe Aerodrome		CSU3		Saint-Hyacinthe	Quebec
Saint-Jean Airport (Saint-Jean-sur-Richelieu Airport)	CYJN		YJN	Saint-Jean-sur-Richelieu	Quebec
Saint-Jean-Chrysostome Aerodrome		CSG5		Saint-Jean-Chrysostome	Quebec
Saint-Jérôme (Hydro-Québec) Heliport		CSZ6		Saint-Jérôme	Quebec
St. John's International Airport	CYYT		YYT	St. John's	Newfoundland and Labrador
St. John's (Health Sciences Centre) Heliport		CCK2		St. John's	Newfoundland and Labrador
St. John's (Paddys Pond) Water Aerodrome		CCQ5		St. John's	Newfoundland and Labrador
St. John's (Quinlan Heliflight Services) Heliport		CDC2		St. John's	Newfoundland and Labrador
Saint-Lambert-de-Lauzon Aerodrome		CST7		Saint-Lambert-de-Lauzon	Quebec
Saint-Léonard Aerodrome	CYSL		YSL	Saint-Léonard	New Brunswick
St. Lewis (Fox Harbour) Airport		CCK4		St. Lewis	Newfoundland and Labrador
Saint-Louis-de-France Aerodrome		CSJ5		Saint-Louis-de-France	Quebec
Saint-Mathias Aerodrome		CSP5		Saint-Mathias-sur-Richelieu	Quebec
Saint-Mathias/Grant Aerodrome		CSX5		Saint-Mathias-sur-Richelieu	Quebec
Saint-Mathias Water Aerodrome		CSV9		Saint-Mathias-sur-Richelieu	Quebec
Saint-Mathieu-de-Beloeil Aerodrome		CSB3		Saint-Mathieu-de-Beloeil	Quebec
Saint-Mathieu-de-Laprairie Aerodrome		CML8		Saint-Mathieu-de-Laprairie	Quebec
Saint-Michel Heliport		CML9		Saint-Michel	Quebec
Saint-Michel-des-Saints Aerodrome		CSM5		Saint-Michel-des-Saints	Quebec
Saint-Michel-des-Saints/Lac Kaiagamac Water Aerodrome		CLK4		Saint-Michel-des-Saints	Quebec
Saint-Michel-des-Saints/Port Saint Michel Water Aerodrome		CMS3		Saint-Michel-des-Saints	Quebec
St. Paul Aerodrome		CEW3		St. Paul	Alberta
St. Paul (Saint Therese Healthcare Centre) Heliport		CTP5		St. Paul	Alberta
St. Peter's/Cape George Water Aerodrome		CCG6		St. Peter's	Nova Scotia
St-Pierre-Jolys (Carl's Field) Aerodrome		CPJ6		St-Pierre-Jolys	Manitoba
Saint-Raymond/Paquet Aerodrome		CSK5		Saint-Raymond	Quebec
Saint-Remi-d'Amherst/Kanata Tremblant Resort Heliport		CKT6		Saint-Remi-d'Amherst	Quebec
St. Stephen Airport		CCS3		St. Stephen	New Brunswick
St. Theresa Point Airport	CYST		YST	St. Theresa Point First Nation	Manitoba
St. Thomas Municipal Airport	CYQS		YQS	St. Thomas	Ontario
Sainte-Véronique Water Aerodrome		CSW9		Sainte-Veronique	Quebec
Saint-Victor-de-Beauce Aerodrome		CSL5		Saint-Victor	Quebec
Salaberry-de-Valleyfield Aerodrome		CSD3		Salaberry-de-Valleyfield	Quebec
Salluit Airport	CYZG		YZG	Salluit	Quebec
Salmon Arm Airport	CZAM		YSN	Salmon Arm	British Columbia
Sambaa K'e Aerodrome		CEU9		Sambaa K'e	Northwest Territories
Sambaa K'e Water Aerodrome		CEG9		Sambaa K'e	Northwest Territories
Sand Point Lake Water Aerodrome		CJD6		Sand Point Lake	Ontario
Sandspit Airport	CYZP		YZP	Sandspit	British Columbia
Sandy Bay Airport		CJY4		Sandy Bay	Saskatchewan
Sandy Bay Water Aerodrome		CKB5		Sandy Bay	Saskatchewan
Sandy Lake Airport	CZSJ		ZSJ	Sandy Lake First Nation	Ontario
Sandy Lake Water Aerodrome		CKE5		Sandy Lake First Nation	Ontario
Sanikiluaq Airport	CYSK		YSK	Sanikiluaq	Nunavut
Sanirajak Airport	CYUX		YUX	Sanirajak	Nunavut
Sarnia (Bluewater Health) Heliport		CBW5		Sarnia	Ontario
Sarnia Chris Hadfield Airport	CYZR		YZR	Sarnia	Ontario
Saskatoon/Banga Air Aerodrome		CJN5		Saskatoon	Saskatchewan
Saskatoon (Jim Pattison Children's Hospital) Heliport		CJP4		Saskatoon	Saskatchewan
Saskatoon John G. Diefenbaker International Airport	CYXE		YXE	Saskatoon	Saskatchewan
Saskatoon/Richter Field Aerodrome		CRF5		Martensville	Saskatchewan
Saugeen Municipal Airport	CYHS			Hanover	Ontario
Sault Ste. Marie Airport	CYAM		YAM	Sault Ste. Marie	Ontario
Sault Ste. Marie Heliport		CNR3		Sault Ste. Marie	Ontario
Sault Ste. Marie/Partridge Point Water Aerodrome		CPP9		Sault Ste. Marie	Ontario
Sault Ste. Marie (Sault Area Hospital) Heliport		CSM9		Sault Ste. Marie	Ontario
Sault Ste. Marie Water Aerodrome		CPX8		Sault Ste. Marie	Ontario
Savant Lake (Sturgeon Lake) Water Aerodrome		CJP3		Savant Lake	Ontario
Schefferville Airport	CYKL		YKL	Schefferville	Quebec
Schefferville/Squaw Lake Water Aerodrome		CSZ9		Schefferville	Quebec
Schomberg/Amaroo Heliport		CNA6		Schomberg	Ontario
Schomberg (Sloan Field) Aerodrome		CSV8		Schomberg	Ontario
Scottsfield Airpark		CCF9		Fredericton	New Brunswick
Scugog/Charlies Landing Water Aerodrome		CHS4		Scugog	Ontario
Seabee Mine Aerodrome		CCB2		Seabee Gold Mine	Saskatchewan
Seagrave/North Port Aerodrome		CNP4		Seagrave	Ontario
Seagrave/North Port Water Aerodrome		CNP2		Seagrave	Ontario
Sechelt Aerodrome		CAP3		Sechelt / Gibsons	British Columbia
Sechelt (Sechelt Hospital) Heliport		CBP4		Sechelt	British Columbia
Selkirk Aerodrome		CJA2		Selkirk	Ontario
Selkirk Airport		CKL2		Selkirk	Manitoba
Selkirk Water Aerodrome		CKC5		Selkirk	Manitoba
Sept-Îles Airport	CYZV		YZV	Sept-Îles	Quebec
Sept-Îles (H, Stever) Heliport		CHS2		Sept-Îles	Quebec
Sept-Îles/Héli-Boréal Heliport		CHB4		Sept-Îles	Quebec
Sept-Îles (Hydro-Québec) Heliport		CTA2		Sept-Îles	Quebec
Sept-Îles/Lac Rapides Water Aerodrome		CSM8		Sept-Îles	Quebec
Sept-Îles/Mustang Helicopters Heliport		CHE3		Sept-Îles	Quebec
Severn Bridge Aerodrome		CSB7		Severn Bridge	Ontario
Severn Bridge/Buck Lake Water Aerodrome		CBL2		Severn Bridge	Ontario
Sevogle Airport		CCM3		Big Sevogle River	New Brunswick
Sexsmith/Exeter Airport		CSX7		Exeter	Ontario
Seymour Arm Aerodrome		CSM4		Seymour Arm	British Columbia
Shamattawa Airport	CZTM		ZTM	Shamattawa First Nation	Manitoba
Shaunavon Airport		CJC5		Shaunavon	Saskatchewan
Shawnigan Lake (Elie Acres) Heliport		CLE3		Shawnigan Lake	British Columbia
Shawnigan Lake Water Aerodrome		CAV8		Shawnigan Lake	British Columbia
Shearwater Heliport (CFB Shearwater, Halifax/Shearwater Heliport)	CYAW		YAW	Shearwater	Nova Scotia
Shediac Bridge Aerodrome		CSB5		Shediac Bridge-Shediac River	New Brunswick
Shefford Heliport		CSC4		Shefford	Quebec
Shelburne/Fisher Field Aerodrome		CNN3		Shelburne	Ontario
Shelburne (Roseway Hospital) Heliport		CCZ9		Shelburne	Nova Scotia
Shelburne (Schaefer Field) Aerodrome		CSF4		Shelburne	Ontario
Shellbrook Airport		CJZ4		Shellbrook	Saskatchewan
Sherbrooke Airport	CYSC		YSC	Sherbrooke	Quebec
Sherbrooke (CHUS)/François Desourdy Heliport		CSG7		Sherbrooke	Quebec
Shoal Lake Airport		CKL5		Shoal Lake	Manitoba
Shoal Lake Water Aerodrome		CKB9		Shoal Lake	Manitoba
Shubenacadie Heliport		CSU4		Shubenacadie	Nova Scotia
Shunda (Fire Base) Heliport		CDA7		Shunda	Alberta
Sicamous/Owls Landing Heliport		COL4		Sicamous	British Columbia
Silver City Airport		CFQ5		Silver City	Yukon
Silver Falls Airport		CKB8		Silver Falls	Manitoba
Silver Falls Water Aerodrome		CKJ5		Silver Falls	Manitoba
Simcoe (Dennison Field) Airport		CPA4		Simcoe	Ontario
Simco (Norfolk General Hospital) Heliport		CPA8		Simcoe	Ontario
Sioux Lookout Airport	CYXL		YXL	Sioux Lookout	Ontario
Sioux Lookout/Pelican Lake Water Aerodrome		CKA6		Sioux Lookout	Ontario
Six Mile Lake (Hungry Bay) Water Aerodrome		CML6		Six Mile Lake	Ontario
Six Mile Lake (South) Water Aerodrome		CSM6		Six Mile Lake	Ontario
Skeleton Lake Water Aerodrome		CPQ7		Skeleton Lake	Ontario
Slate Falls Airport		CKD9		Slate Falls First Nation	Ontario
Slave Lake Airport	CYZH		YZH	Slave Lake	Alberta
Slave Lake/Slave Lake Helicopters Heliport		CSL6		Slave Lake	Alberta
Smithers Airport	CYYD		YYD	Smithers	British Columbia
Smithers (Canadian) Heliport		CAA6		Smithers	British Columbia
Smithers/Tyhee Lake Water Aerodrome		CAX8		Smithers	British Columbia
Smiths Falls (Community Hospital) Heliport		CNS9		Smiths Falls	Ontario
Smiths Falls-Montague Airport (Smiths Falls-Montague (Russ Beach) Airport)	CYSH		YSH	Smiths Falls	Ontario
Smithville Aerodrome		CLS6		Smithville	Ontario
Smokey Lake (George McDougall Health Centre) Heliport		CGM2		Smoky Lake	Alberta
Smoky Lake Water Aerodrome		CNS2		Port Loring	Ontario
Snare River Airport		CEV9		Snare River	Northwest Territories
Snow Lake Airport		CJE4		Snow Lake	Manitoba
Snow Lake (Gogal) Heliport		CSN5		Snow Lake	Manitoba
Snow Lake Water Aerodrome		CKM5		Snow Lake	Manitoba
Somerset Aerodrome		CKC8		Somerset	Manitoba
Sonora Resort Heliport		CSR6		Sonora Island	British Columbia
Sorel Airport		CSY3		Sorel-Tracy	Quebec
Souris Glenwood Industrial Air Park		CJX5		Souris	Manitoba
Southampton Aerodrome		CPF7		Southampton	Ontario
South Brook Water Aerodrome		CCT5		South Brook	Newfoundland and Labrador
South Cariboo Regional Airport (108 Mile Ranch Airport)	CZML		ZMH	108 Mile Ranch	British Columbia
Southend/Hans Ulricksen Field Aerodrome		CKA9		Southend	Saskatchewan
Southend Water Aerodrome		CKP5		Southend	Saskatchewan
South Indian Lake Airport	CZSN		XSI	South Indian Lake	Manitoba
South Shore Regional Airport	CYAU			Liverpool	Nova Scotia
Spanish/Aird Island Water Aerodrome		CRD8		Spanish	Ontario
Sparwood/Elk Valley Airport	CYSW			Sparwood	British Columbia
Spirit River Airport		CFS5		Spirit River	Alberta
Spiritwood/H & M Fast Farms Aerodrome		CHM2		Spiritwood	Saskatchewan
Spout Lake Water Aerodrome		CSU6		Spout Lake	British Columbia
Springbank Airport (Calgary/Springbank Airport)	CYBW	CYBW	YBW	Calgary	Alberta
Springdale Aerodrome		CCD2		Springdale	Newfoundland and Labrador
Springdale/Davis Pond Water Aerodrome		CDU4		Springdale	Newfoundland and Labrador
Springhouse Airpark		CAQ4	YSE	Springhouse	British Columbia
Springvale Aerodrome		CGV7		Springvale	Ontario
Spring Valley (North) Airport		CKP2		Spring Valley	Saskatchewan
Springwater (Barrie Airpark) Aerodrome		CNA3		Springwater	Ontario
Squamish Airport	CYSE		ZST	Squamish	British Columbia
Stanley Airport		CCW4		Stanley	Nova Scotia
Stanstead/Weller Airport		CTQ2		Stanstead	Quebec
Starbuck Aerodrome		CKJ7		Starbuck	Manitoba
Staunton Lake Water Aerodrome		CKK8		Staunton Lake	Ontario
Stayner (Clearview Field) Aerodrome		CLV2		Stayner	Ontario
Steinbach Airport		CJB3		Steinbach	Manitoba
Steinbach (South) Airport		CKK7		Steinbach	Manitoba
Stenen/Clayton Air 3 Aerodrome		CCA5		Stenen	Saskatchewan
Stephenville International Airport	CYJT		YJT	Stephenville	Newfoundland and Labrador
Stettler Airport		CEJ3		Stettler	Alberta
Stettler (Hospital & Care Centre) Heliport		CLH2		Stettler	Alberta
Stettler/Lyster Field Aerodrome		CLY3		Stettler	Alberta
Stewart Aerodrome	CZST			Stewart	British Columbia
Stewart Water Aerodrome		CAC9		Stewart	British Columbia
Stirling Aerodrome		CPJ5		Stirling-Rawdon	Ontario
Stoney Creek Airport		CPF6		Stoney Creek	Ontario
Stoney Point (Le Cunff) Airport		CRML		Stoney Point	Ontario
Stony Plain (Stony Field) Aerodrome		CSP3		Stony Plain	Alberta
Stony Plain (Westview Health Centre) Heliport		CSP2		Stony Plain	Alberta
Stony Rapids Airport	CYSF		YSF	Stony Rapids	Saskatchewan
Stony Rapids Water Aerodrome		CKW5		Stony Rapids	Saskatchewan
Stouffville Aerodrome		CBB2		Stouffville	Ontario
Straffordville/Bushhawk Creek Aerodrome		CBH5		Straffordville	Ontario
Stratford Municipal Airport	CYSA			Stratford	Ontario
Strathclair Airport		CJY5		Strathclair	Manitoba
Strathmore (Appleton Field) Aerodrome		CAP9		Strathmore	Alberta
Strathmore (D.J. Murray) Airport		CDJ5		Strathmore	Alberta
Strathmore (District Health Services) Heliport		CSM2		Strathmore	Alberta
Strathroy (Blue Yonder) Airport		CPK2		Strathroy-Caradoc	Ontario
Sturgeon Bay/Richards Beach Water Aerodrome		CRB6		Sturgeon Bay	Ontario
Sturgeon Falls (West Nipissing General Hospital) Heliport		CNM3		Sturgeon Falls	Ontario
Sudbury Airport (Greater Sudbury Airport)	CYSB		YSB	Greater Sudbury	Ontario
Sudbury/Azilda Water Aerodrome		CNC5		Greater Sudbury	Ontario
Sudbury/Coniston Airport		CSC9		Greater Sudbury	Ontario
Sudbury (Health Sciences North) Hospital Heliport		CSL8		Greater Sudbury	Ontario
Sudbury/Kelly Lake Heliport		CSU8		Greater Sudbury	Ontario
Sudbury/Lively (Skyline Helicopter Technologies) Heliport		CSK7		Greater Sudbury	Ontario
Sudbury/Long Lake (Wavy) Water Aerodrome		CLL6		Greater Sudbury	Ontario
Sudbury/Ramsey Lake Water Aerodrome		CNB8		Greater Sudbury	Ontario
Suffield Heliport (CFB Suffield)	CYSD	CYSD	YSD	Suffield	Alberta
Sullivan Bay Water Aerodrome		CAV5	YTG	Sullivan Bay	British Columbia
Summer Beaver Airport		CJV7	SUR	Nibinamik First Nation	Ontario
Summerside Airport	CYSU		YSU	Summerside	Prince Edward Island
Summerside (Prince County Hospital) Heliport		CCH6		Summerside	Prince Edward Island
Sunderland Aerodrome		CSD7		Sunderland	Ontario
Sundre Airport		CFN7		Sundre	Alberta
Sundre/Goodwins Farm Airport		CFZ5		Sundre	Alberta
Sundre (Hospital & Health Care Centre) Heliport		CSD2		Sundre	Alberta
Sundridge/South River Airpark		CPE6		South River / Sundridge	Ontario
Surge Narrows Water Aerodrome		CAG9		Surge Narrows Provincial Park	British Columbia
Sussex Aerodrome		CCY3		Sussex	New Brunswick
Swan Hills Airport		CEM5		Swan Hills	Alberta
Swan River Airport	CZJN		ZJN	Swan River	Manitoba
Swan River/PVA1 Aerodrome		CSR2		Swan River	Manitoba
Swift Current Airport	CYYN		YYN	Swift Current	Saskatchewan
Swift Current (Cypress Regional Hospital) Heliport		CCY2		Swift Current	Saskatchewan
Sydney (Cape Breton Regional Hospital) Heliport		CSY9		Sydney	Nova Scotia
