= List of Canadian airports by location indicator: CK =

This is a list of all Nav Canada certified and registered water and land airports, aerodromes and heliports in the provinces and territories of Canada sorted by location identifier.

They are listed in the format:

- Location indicator – IATA – Airport name (alternate name) – Airport location

== CK – Canada – CAN ==
Also see airport category and list.

TC LID	IATA	Airport name	Community	Province or territory
CKA2		Kelvington/Clayton Air 2 Aerodrome	Kelvington	Saskatchewan
CKA3		Leaf Rapids Water Aerodrome	Leaf Rapids	Manitoba
CKA4		Zhoda Airport	Zhoda	Manitoba
CKA6		Sioux Lookout/Pelican Lake Water Aerodrome	Sioux Lookout	Ontario
CKA7		Carnarvon/Kushog Lake Water Aerodrome	Carnarvon	Ontario
CKA8		St. François Xavier Airport	St. François Xavier	Manitoba
CKA9		Southend/Hans Ulricksen Field Aerodrome	Southend	Saskatchewan
CKB2		Patuanak Airport	Patuanak	Saskatchewan
CKB3		Trail (Kootenay Boundary Regional Hospital) Heliport	Trail	British Columbia
CKB4		Otter Lake Water Aerodrome	Otter Lake	Saskatchewan
CKB5		Sandy Bay Water Aerodrome	Sandy Bay	Saskatchewan
CKB6	YAX	Angling Lake/Wapekeka Airport	Wapekeka First Nation	Ontario
CKB7		Roblin Airport	Roblin	Manitoba
CKB8		Silver Falls Airport	Silver Falls	Manitoba
CKB9		Shoal Lake Water Aerodrome	Shoal Lake	Manitoba
CKC2		Points North Landing Water Aerodrome	Points North Landing	Saskatchewan
CKC3		King City/Kingsbridge Heliport	King City	Ontario
CKC4		Calgary/K. Coffey Residence Heliport	Calgary	Alberta
CKC5		Selkirk Water Aerodrome	Selkirk	Manitoba
CKC6		Lanigan Airport	Lanigan	Saskatchewan
CKC7		Rockglen Airport	Rockglen	Saskatchewan
CKC8		Somerset Aerodrome	Somerset	Manitoba
CKC9		Pangman Airport	Pangman	Saskatchewan
CKD2		Porcupine Plain Airport	Porcupine Plain	Saskatchewan
CKD3		Lynn Lake (Eldon Lake) Water Aerodrome	Lynn Lake	Manitoba
CKD5		Kipling Airport	Kipling	Saskatchewan
CKD6		Thompson Water Aerodrome	Thompson	Manitoba
CKD7		Roland (Graham Field) Airport	Roland	Manitoba
CKD8		Kirkfield/Balsam Lake Aerodrome	Kirkfield (Balsam Lake)	Ontario
CKD9		Slate Falls Airport	Slate Falls First Nation	Ontario
CKE2		Quill Lake Airport	Quill Lake	Saskatchewan
CKE4		Pelican Narrows Water Aerodrome	Pelican Narrows	Saskatchewan
CKE5		Sandy Lake Water Aerodrome	Sandy Lake First Nation	Ontario
CKE6		Thunder Bay Water Aerodrome	Thunder Bay	Ontario
CKE8		Unity Aerodrome	Unity	Saskatchewan
CKE9		Nipigon (District Memorial Hospital) Heliport	Nipigon	Ontario
CKF2		Radville Airport	Radville	Saskatchewan
CKF3		Atikokan (General Hospital) Heliport	Atikokan	Ontario
CKF4		Goodsoil Airport	Goodsoil	Saskatchewan
CKF5		Kashabowie/Upper Shebandowan Lake Water Aerodrome	Kashabowie	Ontario
CKF6		MacGregor Airfield	MacGregor	Manitoba
CKF8		Cookstown/Kirby Field Aerodrome	Cookstown	Ontario
CKF9		De Lesseps Lake Airport	De Lesseps Lake	Ontario
CKG2		Riverton Airport	Riverton	Manitoba
CKG4		Pickle Lake Water Aerodrome	Pickle Lake	Ontario
CKG5		Manitou Airport	Manitou	Manitoba
CKG6		Uranium City Water Aerodrome	Uranium City	Saskatchewan
CKG8		Kakabeka Falls Airport	Kakabeka Falls	Ontario
CKH3		Debden Airport	Debden	Saskatchewan
CKH5		Killam (Health Centre) Heliport	Killam	Alberta
CKH6		Vermilion Bay Water Aerodrome	Vermilion Bay	Ontario
CKH8		Lumsden (Colhoun) Airport	Lumsden	Saskatchewan
CKH9		Kelowna (General Hospital) Heliport	Kelowna	British Columbia
CKJ2		Rosenort Airport	Rosenort	Manitoba
CKJ3		McGavock Lake Water Aerodrome	McGavock Lake	Manitoba
CKJ5		Silver Falls Water Aerodrome	Silver Falls	Manitoba
CKJ7		Starbuck Aerodrome	Starbuck	Manitoba
CKJ8		Molson Lake Airport	Molson Lake	Manitoba
CKJ9		Lemberg Airport	Lemberg	Saskatchewan
CKK2		St. Brieux Airport	St. Brieux	Saskatchewan
CKK3		Coronach/Scobey Border Station Airport	Coronach / Scobey, Montana	Saskatchewan
CKK7		Steinbach (South) Airport	Steinbach	Manitoba
CKK8		Staunton Lake Water Aerodrome	Staunton Lake	Ontario
CKL2		Selkirk Airport	Selkirk	Manitoba
CKL3	WNN	Wunnumin Lake Airport	Wunnumin Lake First Nation	Ontario
CKL4		Kennisis Lake/Jenny's Landing Water Aerodrome	West Guilford (Kennisis Lake)	Ontario
CKL5		Shoal Lake Airport	Shoal Lake	Manitoba
CKL6		Little Bear Lake Airport	Little Bear Lake	Saskatchewan
CKL8		Upsala Heliport	Upsala	Ontario
CKL9		Regina Beach Airport	Regina Beach	Saskatchewan
CKM4		Jan Lake Airport	Jan Lake	Saskatchewan
CKM5		Snow Lake Water Aerodrome	Snow Lake	Manitoba
CKM6		Easterville Airport	Easterville	Manitoba
CKM7		Thompson Heliport	Thompson	Manitoba
CKM8		Opapimiskan Lake Airport	Musselwhite mine	Ontario
CKM9		Kentville (Camp Aldershot) Heliport	Kentville	Nova Scotia
CKN5		Fillmore Airport	Fillmore	Saskatchewan
CKN8		Nekweaga Bay Airport	Nekweaga Bay	Saskatchewan
CKO2		Kashabowie Outposts (Eva Lake) Water Aerodrome	Kashabowie	Ontario
CKP2		Spring Valley (North) Airport	Spring Valley	Saskatchewan
CKP3		Minaki/Pistol Lake Water Aerodrome	Minaki	Ontario
CKP4		Kirkfield (Palestine) Aerodrome	Kirkfield	Ontario
CKP5		Southend Water Aerodrome	Southend	Saskatchewan
CKP6		Round Lake (Weagamow Lake) Water Aerodrome	North Caribou Lake First Nation (Weagamow Lake	Ontario
CKP8		Obre Lake/North of Sixty Water Aerodrome	North of Sixty Fishing Camps	Northwest Territories
CKQ3	YNO	North Spirit Lake Airport	North Spirit Lake First Nation	Ontario
CKQ4		Rainy River Water Aerodrome	Rainy River	Ontario
CKQ5		Lucky Lake Airport	Lucky Lake	Saskatchewan
CKQ6		Erickson Municipal Airport	Erickson	Manitoba
CKQ7		Vermilion Bay Airport	Machin	Ontario
CKQ8		McArthur River Airport	McArthur River uranium mine	Saskatchewan
CKR2		Kerrobert Heliport	Kerrobert	Saskatchewan
CKR4		Lundar Airport	Lundar	Manitoba
CKR7		Virden (Gabrielle Farm) Airport	Virden	Manitoba
CKS2		Kennisis Lake/Francis Water Aerodrome	West Guilford (Kennisis Lake)	Ontario
CKS3		Churchill/Truway Field Aerodrome	Churchill	Ontario
CKS4		Red Lake (Howey Bay) Water Aerodrome	Red Lake	Ontario
CKS7		Wadena Airport	Wadena	Saskatchewan
CKS8		Cree Lake/Crystal Lodge (Midgett Field) Aerodrome	Cree Lake	Saskatchewan
CKS9		Kincardine/Shepherd's Landing Airport	Kincardine	Ontario
CKT3		Nestor Falls Water Aerodrome	Nestor Falls	Ontario
CKT4		Red Sucker Lake Water Aerodrome	Red Sucker Lake	Manitoba
CKT6		Saint-Remi-d'Amherst/Kanata Tremblant Resort Heliport	Saint-Remi-d'Amherst	Quebec
CKT7		Wakaw Airport	Wakaw	Saskatchewan
CKT8		Pine Dock Water Aerodrome	Pine Dock	Manitoba
CKU2		Treherne Airport	Treherne	Manitoba
CKU6		Grenfell Airport	Grenfell	Saskatchewan
CKU7		Watrous Airport	Watrous	Saskatchewan
CKV2		Kelvington Airport	Kelvington	Saskatchewan
CKV3		Dryden Best Western Heliport	Dryden	Ontario
CKV4	YDW	Obre Lake/North of Sixty Airport	North of Sixty Fishing Camps	Northwest Territories
CKV8		Kentville (Valley Regional Hospital) Heliport	Kentville	Nova Scotia
CKV9		Fort Vermilion/Country Gardens B&B Heliport	Fort Vermilion	Alberta
CKW3		Nestor Falls/Sabaskong Bay Water Aerodrome	Nestor Falls	Ontario
CKW5		Stony Rapids Water Aerodrome	Stony Rapids	Saskatchewan
CKW7		Kirkfield/Balsam Lake Seaplane Base	Kirkfield (Balsam Lake)	Ontario
CKW8		Knee Lake Water Aerodrome	Knee Lake	Manitoba
CKX4		Fisher Branch Airport	Fisher Branch	Manitoba
CKX5		Dinsmore Aerodrome	Dinsmore	Saskatchewan
CKX8		Big River Airport	Big River	Saskatchewan
CKY2		Whitewood Airport	Whitewood	Saskatchewan
CKY3		Norway House Water Aerodrome	Norway House	Manitoba
CKY4		Killarney (Killarney Mountain Lodge) Water Aerodrome	Killarney	Ontario
CKY8		Cochrane/Arkayla Springs Airport	Cochrane	Alberta
CKZ3		Elk Island Airport	Elk Island	Manitoba
CKZ5		Meteghan/Keizers Air Park	Meteghan	Nova Scotia
CKZ6		Crystal City-Pilot Mound/Louise Municipal Airport	Crystal City	Manitoba
CKZ7		Winkler Aerodrome	Winkler	Manitoba
