= North Star Air =

Canadian charter and cargo airline

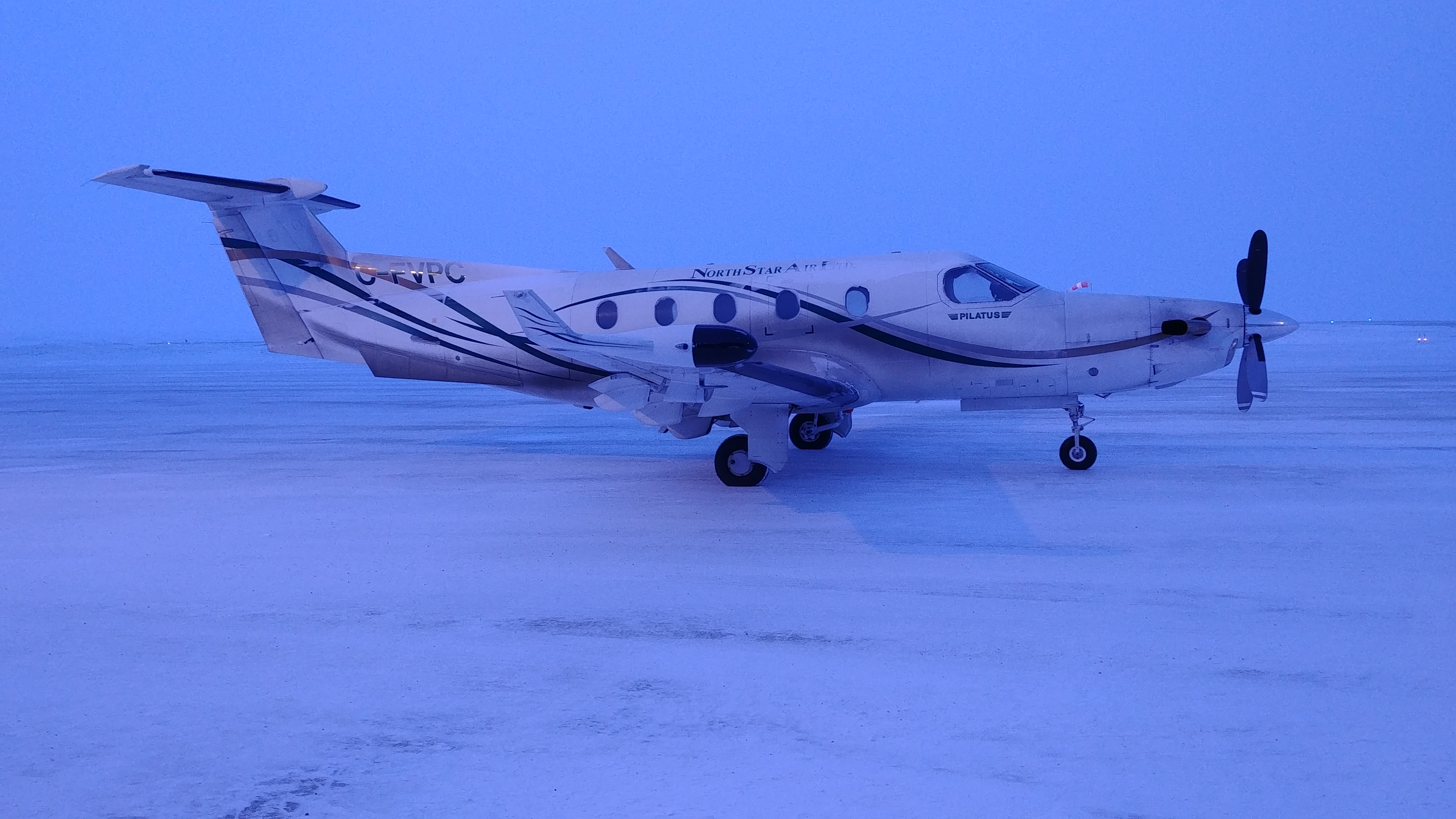
- North Star Air Pilatus PC-12
IATA	CDD	Call sign
0N	BF	BLACKFLY
- AOC #: 11025
- Hubs: Thunder Bay International Airport
- Secondary hubs: Sioux Lookout Airport
- Fleet size: 15, 19
- Destinations: 18
- Parent company: The North West Company
- Headquarters: Thunder Bay, Ontario
- Key people: Frank Kelner
- Website: www.northstarair.ca

North Star Air is a Canadian charter, passenger, and cargo airline with its headquarters in Thunder Bay, Ontario. It maintains a secondary passenger hub in Sioux Lookout, Ontario, and cargo hubs in Pickle Lake, Red Lake, Kapuskasing and Thompson, Manitoba. The airline primarily serves First Nations communities, providing regular service to 18 airports under its "Flex Flight Passenger Service". It also serves other regional destinations on an on-demand basis. Founded in 1997 as a floatplane operator with two DHC-2 Beaver aircraft based in Pickle Lake, the airline has expanded over time and was acquired by new ownership in 2012. In 2015, Cargo North and North Star Air merged under the North Star banner. In 2022, North Star Air opened a new cargo depot in Winnipeg.

On April 28, 2017, The North West Company announced its purchase of North Star Air for $31 million.

== First Nations partners ==
North Star Air partners with eleven First Nations:

Tribal Council	First Nations
Keewaytinook Okimakanak Council	Deer Lake First Nation
Keewaytinook Okimakanak Council	North Spirit Lake First Nation
Keewaytinook Okimakanak Council	Poplar Hill First Nation
Matawa First Nations	Eabametoong First Nation
Matawa First Nations	Marten Falls First Nation
Matawa First Nations	Neskantaga First Nation
Matawa First Nations	Webequie First Nation
Mushkegowuk Council	Kashechewan First Nation
Windigo First Nations Council	Cat Lake First Nation
Windigo First Nations Council	North Caribou Lake First Nation
Windigo First Nations Council	Sachigo Lake First Nation

== Destinations ==
As of April 2025, North Star Air serves the following Ontario destinations:

Province/territory	City	Airport	Notes
Ontario	Bearskin Lake First Nation	Bearskin Lake Airport	
Ontario	Cat Lake First Nation	Cat Lake Airport	
Ontario	Deer Lake First Nation	Deer Lake Airport	
Ontario	Eabametoong First Nation (Fort Hope)	Fort Hope Airport	
Ontario	Kitchenuhmaykoosib Inninuwug First Nation (Big Trout Lake)	Big Trout Lake Airport	
Ontario	Marten Falls First Nation	Ogoki Post Airport	
Ontario	Muskrat Dam Lake First Nation	Muskrat Dam Airport	
Ontario	Neskantaga First Nation	Lansdowne House Airport	
Ontario	North Caribou Lake First Nation (Weagamow / Round Lake)	Round Lake (Weagamow Lake) Airport	
Ontario	North Spirit Lake First Nation	North Spirit Lake Airport	
Ontario	Pikangikum First Nation	Pikangikum Airport	
Ontario	Poplar Hill First Nation	Poplar Hill Airport	
Ontario	Red Lake	Red Lake	
Ontario	Sachigo Lake First Nation	Sachigo Lake Airport	
Ontario	Sioux Lookout	Sioux Lookout Airport	Secondary hub
Ontario	Thunder Bay	Thunder Bay International Airport	Hub
Ontario	Wapekeka First Nation	Angling Lake/Wapekeka Airport	
Ontario	Webequie First Nation	Webequie Airport	

== Fleet ==
As of April 2025 North Star Air had 15 aircraft registered with Transport Canada but lists 19 on its website.

North Star Air fleet
Aircraft	Number TC list	Number North Star list	Variants	Notes
ATR 72	4	5	ATR 72-212A (ATR 72-500)	Based at Thompson, freight only
De Havilland Canada Dash 8	—	4	Series 100/300	Combi aircraft, based at Thunder Bay, up to 39 passengers. Flights are operated by Summit Air.
Douglas DC-3	3	3	Basler BT-67	Based at Kapuskasing, Pickle Lake, Red Lake and Thompson, freight only
Pilatus PC-12	8	7	PC-12/45, PC-12/47, PC-12/47E	Combi aircraft, based at Sioux Lookout and Thunder Bay, up to 9 passengers
Total	15	19		

== Bases ==
North Star Air operates six bases at the following airports:

- Thunder Bay International Airport
- Pickle Lake Airport
- Red Lake Airport
- Kapuskasing Airport
- Sioux Lookout Airport
- Thompson Airport
