= Perimeter Aviation =

Regional Canadian airline, based in Winnipeg

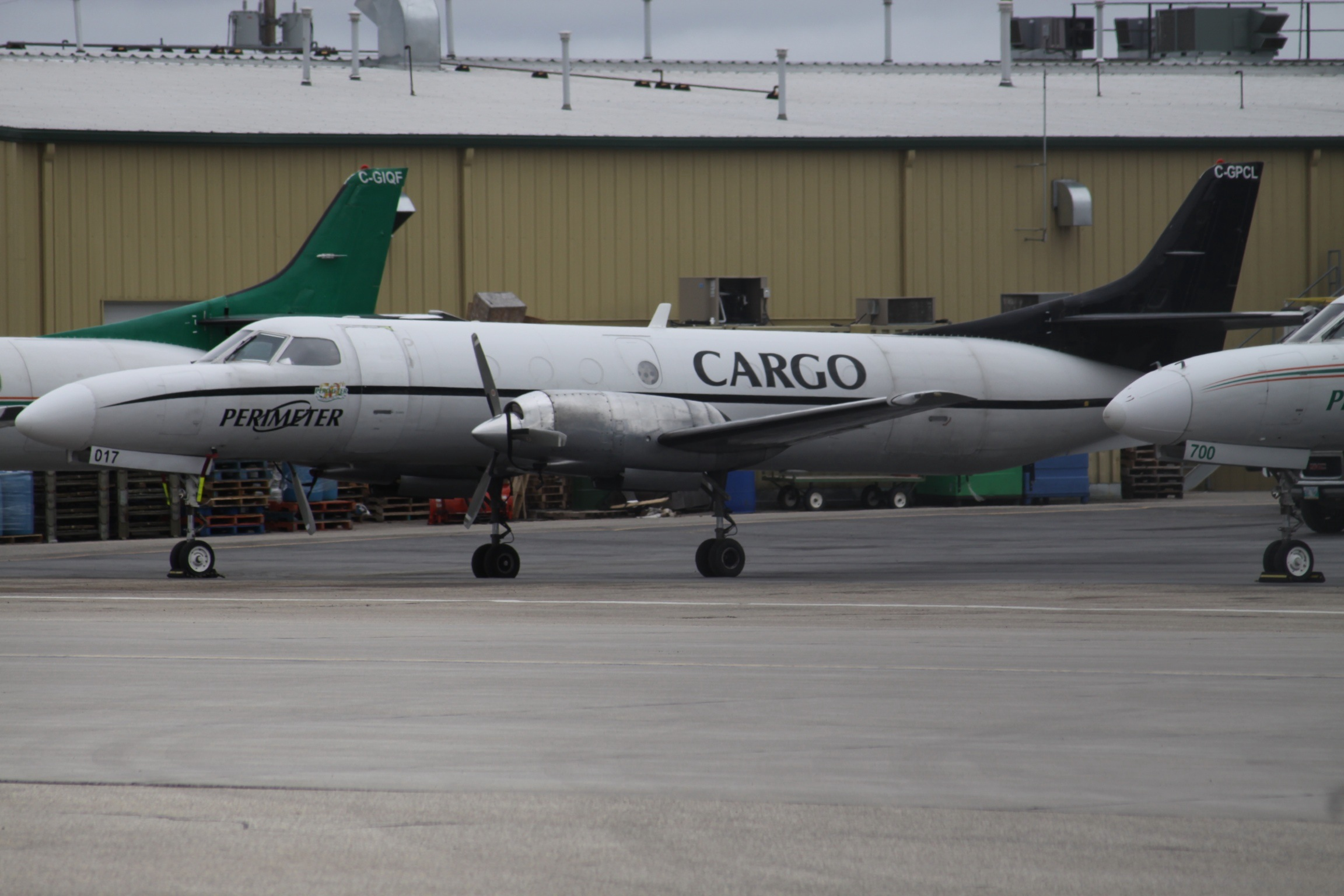
- Perimeter Aviation Fairchild Metroliner
IATA	ICAO	Call sign
JV	PAG	PERIMETER
- Founded: 1960
- AOC #: Canada: 1861; United States: VBBF766I
- Hubs: Winnipeg James Armstrong Richardson International Airport
- Secondary hubs: Thompson Airport, Sioux Lookout Airport
- Focus cities: Thompson; Sioux Lookout
- Frequent-flyer program: Connecting Rewards
- Subsidiaries: Bearskin Airlines
- Fleet size: 41
- Destinations: 23
- Parent company: Exchange Income Corporation
- Headquarters: 626 Ferry Road, Winnipeg James Armstrong Richardson International Airport; Winnipeg, Manitoba, Canada
- Key people: Joey Petrisor (CEO and president), David Patrick (CFO)
- Website: perimeter.ca

Perimeter Aviation is an airline with its head office on the property of Winnipeg James Armstrong Richardson International Airport in Winnipeg, Manitoba, Canada. Perimeter Aviation operates more than 30 aircraft on scheduled, charter, and medevac service. It was established and started operations in 1960. It operates scheduled passenger services from Winnipeg to 23 destinations, freight and MEDEVAC services. Its main base is Winnipeg International Airport.

Perimeter is the largest carrier in Manitoba, in terms of number of aircraft and number of flights.

== Destinations ==
As of 8 June 2026, Perimeter provides scheduled passenger service to the following destinations:

- Manitoba
  - Brochet (Brochet Airport)
  - Cross Lake (Cross Lake (Charlie Sinclair Memorial) Airport)
  - Gods Lake Narrows (Gods Lake Narrows Airport)
  - Island Lake/Garden Hill First Nation (Island Lake Airport)
  - Lac Brochet (Lac Brochet Airport)
  - Manto Sipi Cree Nation (Gods River) (Gods River Airport)
  - Norway House (Norway House Airport)
  - Oxford House (Oxford House Airport)
  - Red Sucker Lake (Red Sucker Lake Airport)
  - St. Theresa Point First Nation / Wasagamack (St. Theresa Point Airport)
  - Shamattawa First Nation (Shamattawa Airport)
  - South Indian Lake (South Indian Lake Airport)
  - Tadoule Lake (Tadoule Lake Airport)
  - Thompson (Thompson Airport) hub
  - Winnipeg (Winnipeg James Armstrong Richardson International Airport) hub
  - York Factory First Nation (York Landing Airport)
- Ontario
  - Deer Lake First Nation (Deer Lake Airport)
  - North Bay (North Bay/Jack Garland Airport)
  - North Caribou Lake First Nation or Weagamow First Nation (Round Lake (Weagamow Lake) Airport)
  - North Spirit Lake First Nation (North Spirit Lake Airport)
  - Pikangikum First Nation (Pikangikum Airport)
  - Red Lake (Red Lake Airport)
  - Sachigo Lake First Nation (Sachigo Lake Airport)
  - Sandy Lake First Nation (Sandy Lake Airport)
  - Sault Ste. Marie (Sault Ste. Marie Airport)
  - Sioux Lookout (Sioux Lookout Airport) hub
  - Sudbury (Sudbury Airport)
  - Thunder Bay (Thunder Bay Airport)

== Fleet ==
Perimeter operates more than 30 aircraft on scheduled, charter, and MEDEVAC service. The fleet includes 27 Swearingen Metroliner variants, and 17 Bombardier Dash-8s. The Metros can be quickly configured from straight freighter configuration to a 19-seat commuter interior. The Dash-8s can be configured to 37 seats, 29 seats, 21 seats, for the 100 series or up to 45 seats for the 300 series. Straight freighter configuration can accommodate up to 9,280 lb (4,210 kg) cargo

As of 8 June 2026, there were 41 aircraft registered to Perimeter Aviation with Transport Canada:

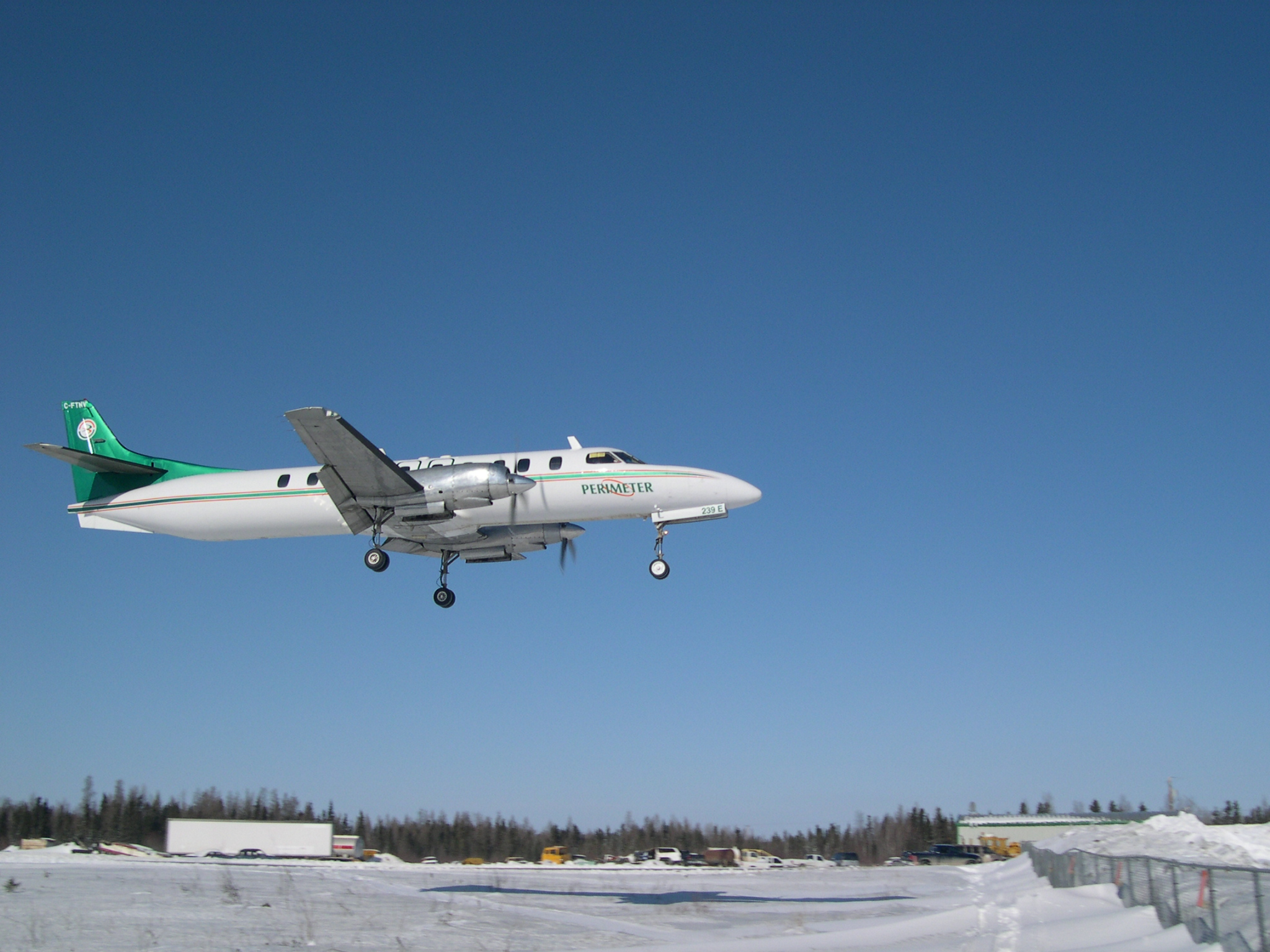
Perimeter Aviation Metro II

Perimeter Aviation fleet
Aircraft	No. of aircraft	Variants	Notes
De Havilland Canada Dash 8	17	6 - DHC-8-102; 2 - DHC-8-106; 9 - DHC-8-314	Up 37 passengers or 7,500 lb (3,400 kg) (100 series) and up to 45 passengers or 9,280 lb (4,210 kg) of cargo (300 series)
Fairchild Metro III	16	11 - SA227-AC; 2 - SA227-CC; 3 - SA227-DC	19 passengers, up to 3,000 lb (1,400 kg) cargo
Swearingen Metro II	7	SA226-TC	Used for MEDEVAC operations and can carry up to 2,800 lb (1,300 kg) cargo
Swearingen Merlin	1	SA226-T	Up to 6 passengers and 700 lb (320 kg) cargo
Total	41		

== Accidents and incidents ==
Perimeter Airlines has had five reported accidents.

- On 1 November 1996, a Swearingen SA.226TC Metro II aircraft was on a scheduled flight to Gods River (ZGI) from Gods Lake Narrows (YGO). With about 345 ft (105 m) to the threshold of runway 27, the right hand main gear touched the ground and collapsed. After travelling about 20 ft (6.1 m), the aircraft hit a ridge of snow. The left gear touched down about 326 ft (99 m) ahead of the threshold and the aircraft went off the right side of the runway. Though the two pilots and five passengers were uninjured, the aircraft was written off.
- In October 2001, a Swearingen SA.226TC Metro II operating as Perimeter Flight 962 arrived at Shamattawa on a MEDIVAC flight to pick up a patient. The aircraft executed a missed approach and was flying to the left of the runway centerline when it hit some trees and came to rest in some muskeg. There were three people on board; both pilots were killed and the third person required hospitalization.
- On 8 November 2006, a Swearingen SA.226TC Metro II was touching down at Norway House. The crew selected propeller reverse and the aircraft veered left with the main tire making contact with some loose snow. The aircraft went over a ditch and climbed an embankment where the landing gear collapsed. The seven passengers and two crew evacuated the plane safely but it was a write-off.
- On 23 December 2012, a Swearingen SA227-AC Metro III passenger plane with nine people aboard, operated by Perimeter on behalf of Keewatin Air, crashed at Sanikiluaq Airport (YSK) in Sanikiluaq, Nunavut, killing an infant boy and injuring the other eight people on board. The aircraft was on a second approach at the time.
