= ZSJ =

ZSJ may refer to:

- ZSJ, the IATA code for Sandy Lake Airport, Ontario, Canada
- ZSJ, ring name of wrestler Zack Sabre Jr.

== See also ==
- ZSJ Škodovy závody, Czech ice hockey team
- ZSJ Technomat Teplice, Czech football club
