= Sandy Lake Airport =

Airport in Ontario, Canada

- IATA: ZSJ; ICAO: CZSJ; WMO: 71098

Summary
- Airport type: Public
- Operator: Government of Ontario - MOT
- Serves: Sandy Lake First Nation
- Location: Sandy Lake
- Time zone: CST (UTC−06:00)
  - Summer (DST): CDT (UTC−05:00)
- Elevation AMSL: 951 ft / 290 m
- Coordinates: 53°03′51″N 093°20′40″W

Map
- Location in Ontario

Runways
Direction	Length		Surface
Direction	ft	m	Surface
11/29	3,507	1,069	Gravel
- Sources: Canada Flight Supplement; Environment Canada

Sandy Lake Airport (IATA: ZSJ, ICAO: CZSJ) is a domestic airport located adjacent to Sandy Lake, Ontario, Canada.

== Airlines and destinations ==
Airlines	Destinations
Bearskin Airlines	Sioux Lookout
Northway Aviation	Deer Lake, Poplar Hill, Winnipeg/St. Andrews
Perimeter Aviation	Pikangikum, Sachigo Lake, Sioux Lookout, Winnipeg
Wasaya Airways	Sioux Lookout, Thunder Bay

== See also ==
- Sandy Lake Water Aerodrome
