= YXL =

YXL or yxl may refer to:

- YXL, the IATA code for Sioux Lookout Airport, Ontario, Canada
- yxl, the ISO 639-3 code for Yardliyawarra language, an extinct language of New South Wales, Australia
