= North Spirit Lake Airport =

- IATA: YNO; ICAO: none; TC LID: CKQ3

Summary
- Airport type: Public
- Operator: Government of Ontario
- Location: North Spirit Lake First Nation
- Time zone: CST (UTC−06:00)
  - Summer (DST): CDT (UTC−05:00)
- Elevation AMSL: 1,082 ft / 330 m
- Coordinates: 52°29′24″N 092°58′16″W

Map
- Location in Ontario

Runways
Direction	Length		Surface
Direction	ft	m	Surface
13/31	3,518	1,072	Gravel
- Source: Canada Flight Supplement

North Spirit Lake Airport (IATA: YNO, TC LID: CKQ3) is located 5 nautical miles (9.3 km; 5.8 mi) southeast of the First Nations community of North Spirit Lake, Ontario, Canada.

== Airlines and destinations ==
Airlines	Destinations
Bearskin Airlines	Sioux Lookout
North Star Air	Red Lake, Sioux Lookout
Perimeter Aviation	Sioux Lookout, Winnipeg
Wasaya Airways	Sioux Lookout
