= Sioux Lookout Airport =

Canadian airport

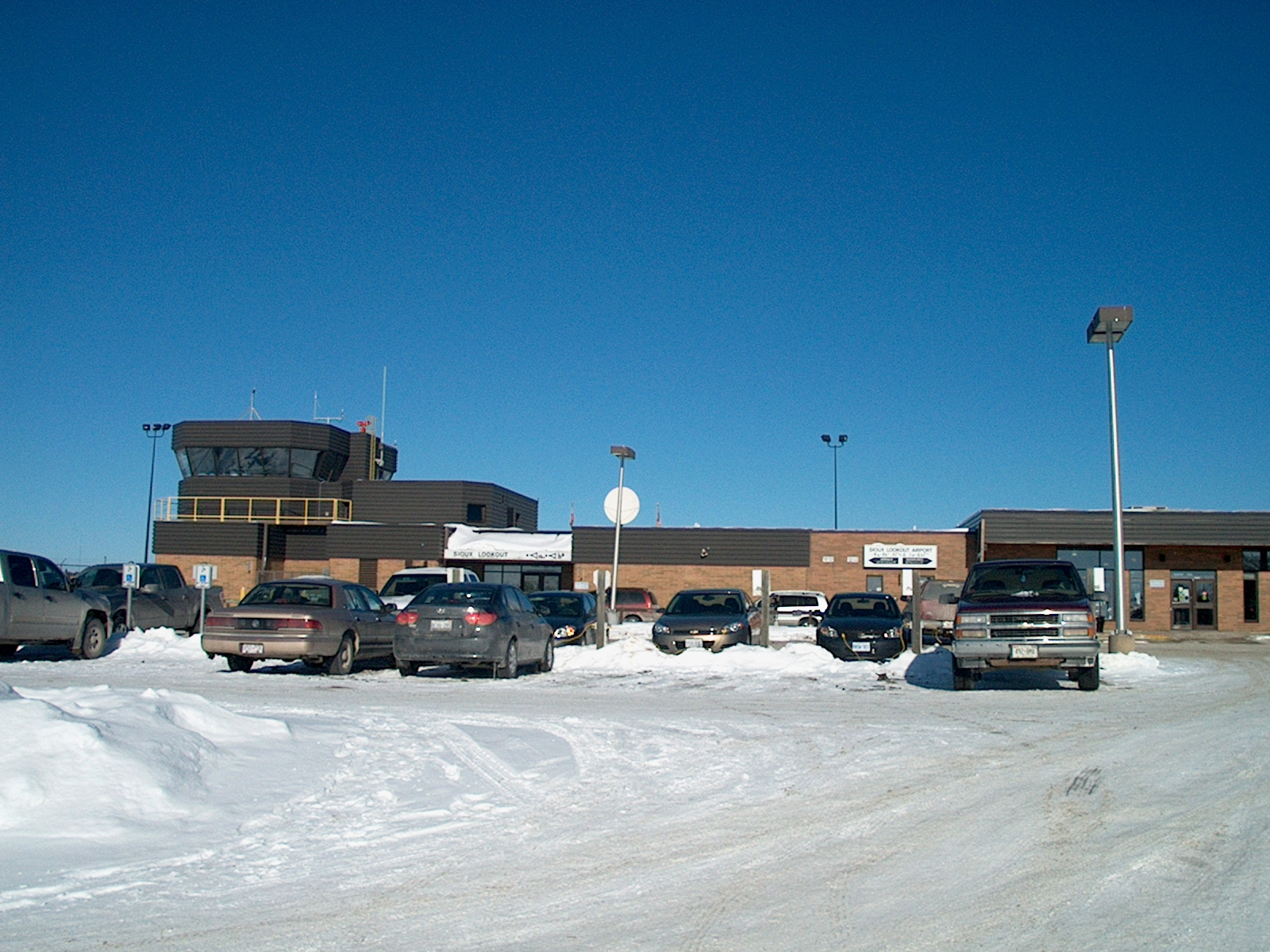
- IATA: YXL; ICAO: CYXL; WMO: 71842

Summary
- Airport type: Public
- Operator: Municipality of Sioux Lookout
- Location: Sioux Lookout, Ontario
- Opened: 1933
- Hub for: North Star; Wasaya Airways; Perimeter Aviation; Slate Falls Airways; Bearskin Airlines
- Time zone: CST (UTC−06:00)
  - Summer (DST): CDT (UTC−05:00)
- Elevation AMSL: 1,257 ft (383 m)
- Coordinates: 50°06′49″N 091°54′20″W

Map
- Location in Ontario CYXL (Canada)

Runways
Direction	Length		Surface
Direction	ft	m	Surface
16/34	5,300	1,615	Asphalt

Statistics (2010)
- Aircraft movements: 28,564
- Sources: Canada Flight Supplement; Environment Canada; Movements from Statistics Canada

Sioux Lookout Airport (IATA: YXL, ICAO: CYXL) is a regional airport located in Sioux Lookout, Ontario, Canada. It is known locally as the "Hub of the North". The airport opened in 1933. In the 1930s, it was reported to be the second-busiest airport in North America, after Chicago Midway International Airport. Today, the airport is a "mini-hub" facilitating travel to and from many northern communities in Northwestern Ontario.

== History ==
Western Canada Airways, formed in 1926, was the first company to operate flights servicing Sioux Lookout. In 1946, Hudson Bay Air Transport began operations at Sioux Lookout.

In 1974, the Municipality of Sioux Lookout bought the airport from the Federal Ministry of Transportation.

In the early 2000s, the airport was averaging about 120,000 passengers per year and 30,000 aircraft movements per year.

== Airlines and destinations ==
Airlines	Destinations
North Star Air	Bearskin Lake, Cat Lake, North Spirit Lake, Poplar Hill, Sachigo Lake, Thunder Bay, Weagamow
Perimeter Aviation	Deer Lake, North Spirit Lake, Pikangikum, Sachigo Lake, Sandy Lake, Weagamow
Slate Falls Airways	Cat Lake, Slate Falls
Wasaya Airways	Thunder Bay

== Tenants ==
- Ornge Air operating Pilatus PC-12 aircraft in Medevac configuration.
- SkyCare Air Ambulance operating Medevac and charter operations.
- Wasaya Airways maintenance facility.
- Bearskin Airlines maintenance facility.
- Northern Skies Air Service operating charters with Piper Chieftains.
- Slate Falls Airways scheduled and charter services.

== See also ==
- Sioux Lookout Water Aerodrome
