= Round Lake (Weagamow Lake) Airport =

- IATA: ZRJ; ICAO: CZRJ

Summary
- Airport type: Public
- Operator: Government of Ontario - MOT
- Serves: North Caribou Lake First Nation
- Location: Weagamow Lake, Ontario
- Time zone: CST (UTC−06:00)
  - Summer (DST): CDT (UTC−05:00)
- Elevation AMSL: 974 ft / 297 m
- Coordinates: 52°56′37″N 091°18′45″W

Map
- Location in Ontario

Runways
Direction	Length		Surface
Direction	ft	m	Surface
03/21	3,613	1,101	Gravel
- Source: Canada Flight Supplement

Round Lake (Weagamow Lake) Airport (IATA: ZRJ, ICAO: CZRJ) is located 1.0 nautical mile (1.9 km; 1.2 mi) east of North Caribou Lake First Nation, (Weagamow Lake) Ontario, Canada.

== Airlines and destinations ==
Airlines	Destinations
Bearskin Airlines	Sioux Lookout
North Star Air	Sioux Lookout, Thunder Bay
Perimeter Aviation	Sioux Lookout
Wasaya Airways	Sioux Lookout

== See also ==
- Round Lake (Weagamow Lake) Water Aerodrome
