= Poplar Hill First Nation =

Poplar Hill Obazaadiikaang anishinaabeg
- Indian reserve
- Poplar Hill Indian Reserve
- Location within Ontario
- Coordinates: 52°06′N 94°18′W
- Country: Canada
- Province: Ontario
- District: Kenora
- First Nation: Poplar Hill

Area
  - Land: 7.02 km^{2} (2.71 sq mi)

Population (2016)
  - Total: 473
  - Density: 65.4/km^{2} (169/sq mi)
- Website: poplarhill.firstnation.ca

Poplar Hill First Nation (Ojibwe: Obazaadiikaang, ᐅᐸᓴᑎᑲᐠ) is an Anishinaabe (Ojibway) First Nation band government, approximately 120 km north of Red Lake near the Ontario-Manitoba border. The First Nation is accessible by air and winter road. In May 2016, the First Nation had a registered population of 473 people.

== History ==
Poplar Hill First Nation achieved full Band and reserve status in 1978 when it separated from the Pikangikum First Nation. The community maintains strong ties with Pikangikum and Little Grand Rapids in Manitoba.

== Governance ==
The First Nation's governing council is elected through the Custom Electoral System, consisting of a Chief, Deputy Chief and three councillors. The current Chief is Patrick Owen, with Jacob acting as the Deputy Chief. The Councillors are Eil Moose, Gary Owen, Rita, and Pardemas.

As a signatory to Treaty 5, the First Nation is a member of the Keewaytinook Okimakanak Council, a Regional Chiefs Council and Nishnawbe Aski Nation, a Tribal Political Organization representing majority of the First Nation governments in northern Ontario.

=== Reserve ===
The First Nation have reserved for themselves the 705.2 ha Poplar Hill Indian reserve. The community of Poplar Hill is located within this Reserve.

== Services ==
- School
  - Abe Scatch Memorial School, K-8th Grade
  - KiHS Poplar Hill of the Keewaytinook Internet Highschool. Some students may elect to 'go out' for school and board in either Sioux Lookout, Ontario, Thunder Bay, or Red Lake, Ontario.
- Child and Family Services worker provided through Tikinagan Child and Family Services in Sioux Lookout
- Health clinic with a Community Health Representative. The community also have access to Sioux Lookout Zone Hospital; hospital services also available in Red Lake.

The community of Poplar Hill is served by the Poplar Hill Airport, 1.1 km to the east of the town. It is linked to Pikangikum, Ontario and points south by winter roads and ice roads.

Poplar Hill is policed by the Nishnawbe-Aski Police Service, an Aboriginal-based service. In addition, Northern Air Patrol from Sioux Lookout and OPP Red Lake Detachment provide additional policing services.
