= Cat Lake Airport =

Airport in Cat Lake First Nation, Ontario, Canada

- IATA: YAC; ICAO: CYAC

Summary
- Airport type: Public
- Operator: Government of Ontario
- Location: Cat Lake First Nation
- Time zone: CST (UTC−06:00)
  - Summer (DST): CDT (UTC−05:00)
- Elevation AMSL: 1,344 ft / 410 m
- Coordinates: 51°43′38″N 091°49′28″W

Map
- Location in Ontario

Runways
Direction	Length		Surface
Direction	ft	m	Surface
11/29	3,963	1,208	Gravel
- Source: Canada Flight Supplement

Cat Lake Airport (IATA: YAC, ICAO: CYAC) is located adjacent to the Cat Lake First Nation, Kenora District, Ontario, Canada, on the central north shore of Cat Lake.

== Airlines and destinations ==
Airlines	Destinations
North Star Air	Sioux Lookout
Perimeter Aviation	Sioux Lookout
Slate Falls Airways	Sioux Lookout
