= Sachigo Lake Airport =

Airport in Ontario, Canada

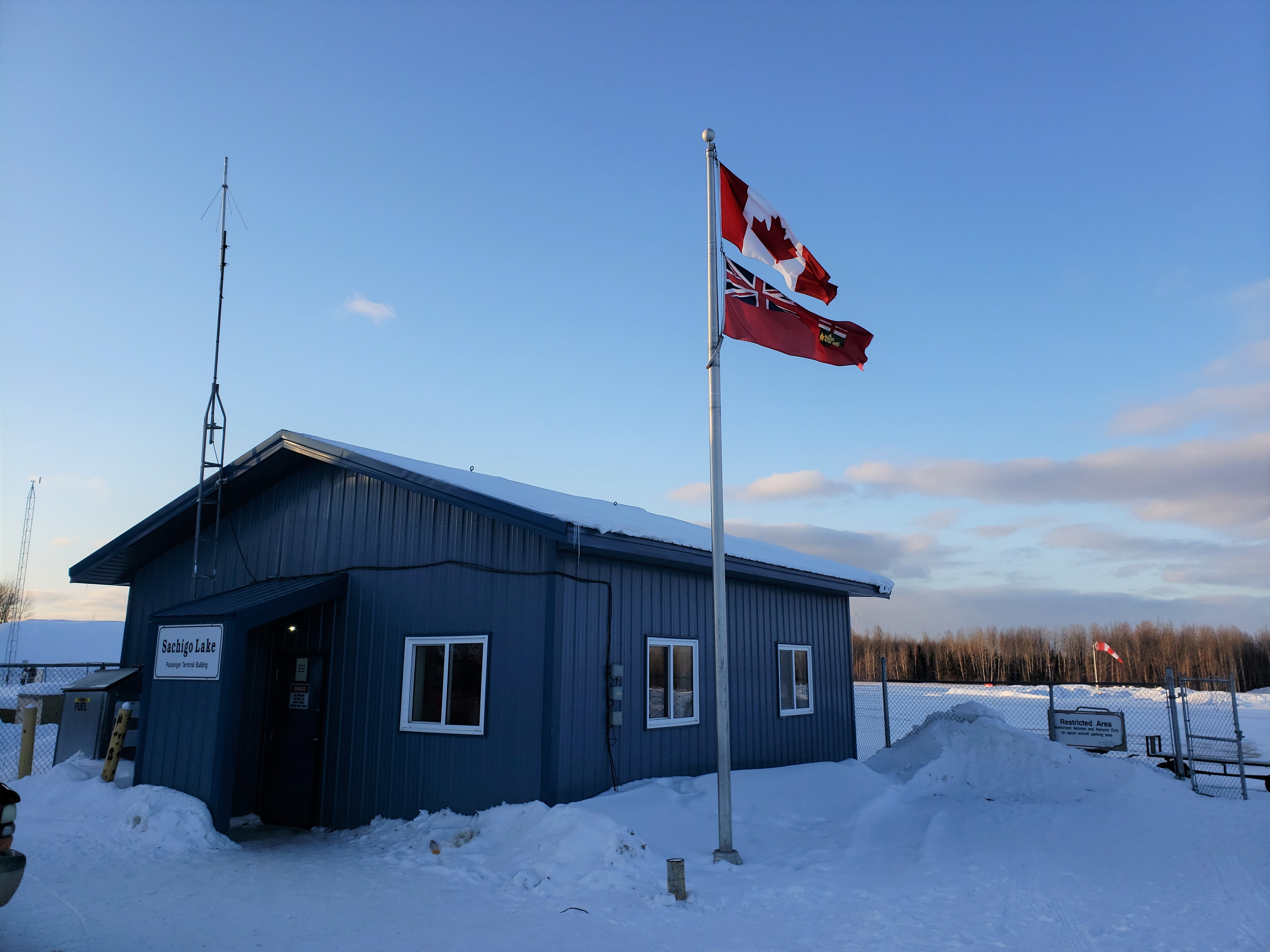
- Airport terminal building, as of February 22, 2019
- IATA: ZPB; ICAO: CZPB

Summary
- Airport type: Public
- Operator: Government of Ontario - MOT
- Location: Sachigo Lake First Nation
- Time zone: CST (UTC−06:00)
  - Summer (DST): CDT (UTC−05:00)
- Elevation AMSL: 876 ft (267 m)
- Coordinates: 53°53′28″N 092°11′47″W

Map
- Location in Ontario

Runways
Direction	Length		Surface
Direction	ft	m	Surface
10/28	3,507	1,069	Gravel

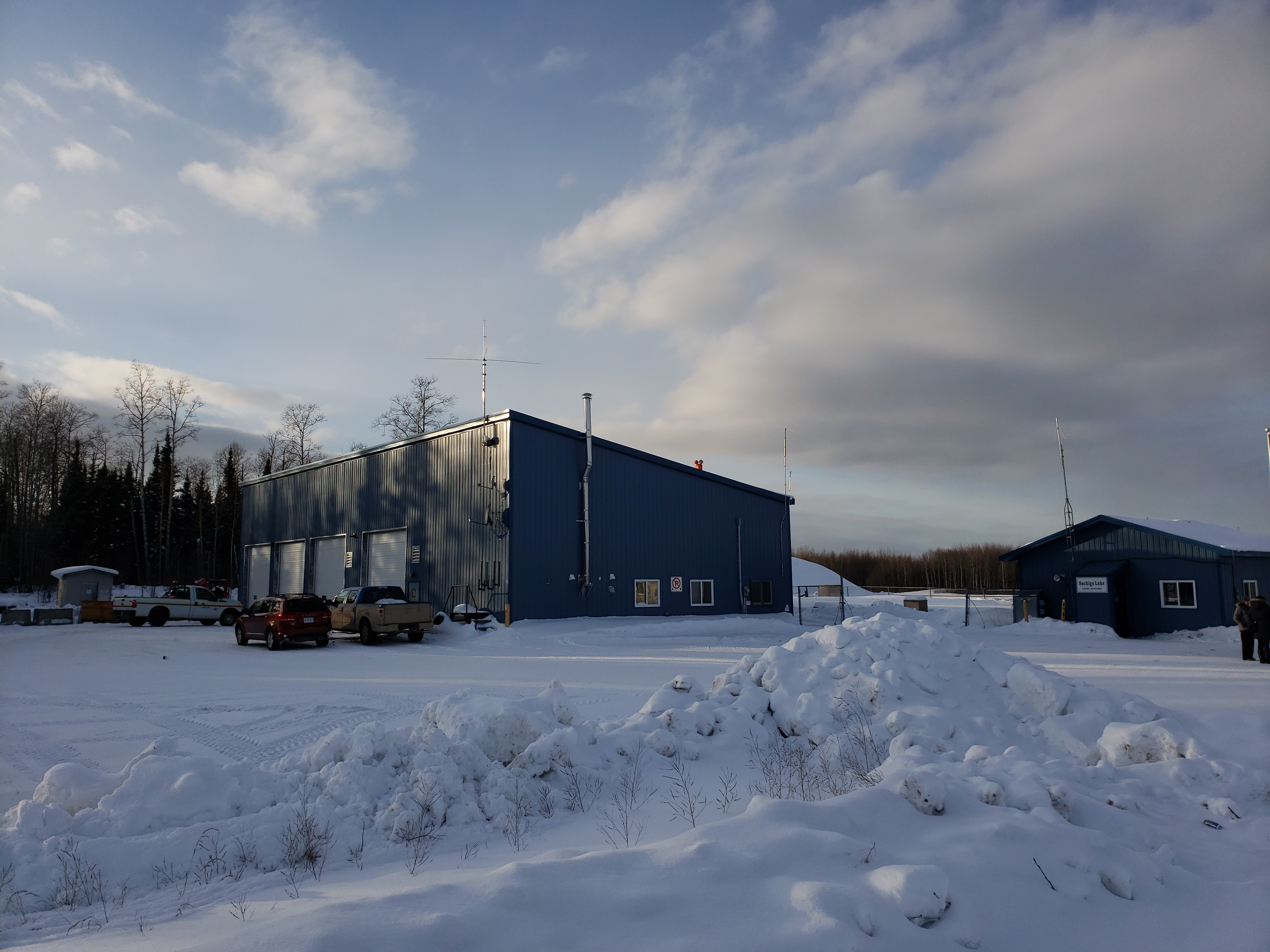
Airport extension, as of February 22, 2019

Sachigo Lake Airport (IATA: ZPB, ICAO: CZPB) is an airport in Sachigo Lake, Ontario, Canada; it is located 1.5 nautical miles (2.8 km; 1.7 mi) north of the First Nations community.

Because Sachigo Lake First Nation is alcohol-free (a "dry" community), each arriving passenger has their luggage searched in a separate arrivals building to make sure they are not bringing any contraband in with them.

== Airlines and destinations ==
Airlines	Destinations
Bearskin Airlines	Sioux Lookout, Thunder Bay
North Star Air	Sioux Lookout, Thunder Bay
Perimeter Aviation	Sandy Lake, Sioux Lookout, Winnipeg

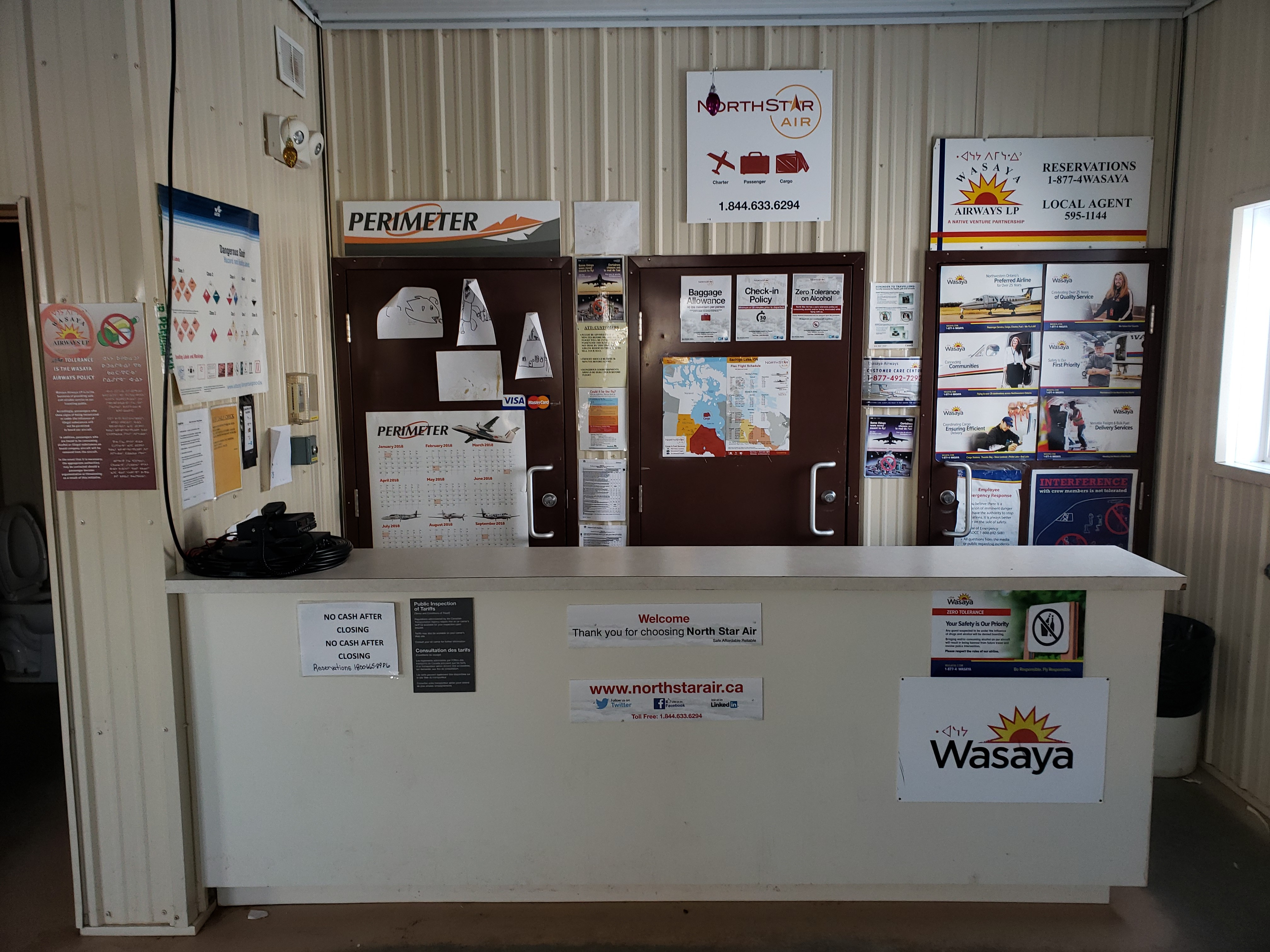
Interior of the Departures building, February 22, 2019

== Accidents and incidents ==
- On 19 January 1986, Douglas C-47A C-GNNA of Austin Airways struck a 150 ft (46 m) high non-directional beacon tower and crashed at Sachigo Lake Airport.
- On 3 December 2019, Basler BT-67 C-FKAL of North Star Air was written off when it collided with terrain 500 metres (1,600 ft) southwest of the threshold of runway 10 while flying Visual Flight Rules (VFR) in Instrument Flight Rules (IFR) conditions. The two crew, the only occupants, were unhurt.
