= Pikangikum Airport =

- IATA: YPM; ICAO: CYPM

Summary
- Airport type: Public
- Operator: Government of Ontario - MTO
- Location: Pikangikum First Nation
- Time zone: CST (UTC−06:00)
  - Summer (DST): CDT (UTC−05:00)
- Elevation AMSL: 1,117 ft / 340 m
- Coordinates: 51°49′11″N 093°58′24″W

Map
- Location in Ontario

Runways
Direction	Length		Surface
Direction	ft	m	Surface
09/27	3,508	1,069	Gravel
- Source: Canada Flight Supplement

Pikangikum Airport (IATA: YPM, ICAO: CYPM) is located 1 nautical mile (1.9 km; 1.2 mi) northeast of the First Nations community of Pikangikum, Ontario, Canada.

== Airlines and destinations ==
Airlines	Destinations
Bearskin Airlines	Sioux Lookout
Perimeter Aviation	Sandy Lake, Sioux Lookout, Winnipeg
Wasaya Airways	Sioux Lookout, Winnipeg

== See also ==
- Pikangikum Water Aerodrome
