= Slate Falls Airport =

- IATA: none; ICAO: none; TC LID: CKD9

Summary
- Airport type: Public
- Operator: Government of Ontario
- Location: Slate Falls, Ontario
- Time zone: CST (UTC−06:00)
  - Summer (DST): CDT (UTC−05:00)
- Elevation AMSL: 1,355 ft / 413 m
- Coordinates: 51°07′48″N 091°39′56″W

Map
- Location in Ontario

Runways
| Direction | Length | | Surface |
| Direction | ft | m | Surface |
|---|---|---|---|
| 10/28 | 3,507 | 1,069 | Gravel |
- Source: Canada Flight Supplement

Slate Falls Airport (TC LID: CKD9) is located 2 nautical miles (3.7 km; 2.3 mi) southwest of Slate Falls, Ontario, Canada.

== Airlines and destinations ==
| Airlines | Destinations |
|---|---|
| Slate Falls Airways | Cat Lake, Sioux Lookout |
