= Thunder Bay Airport =

Airport in Ontario, Canada

Thunder Bay Airport Aéroport de Thunder Bay
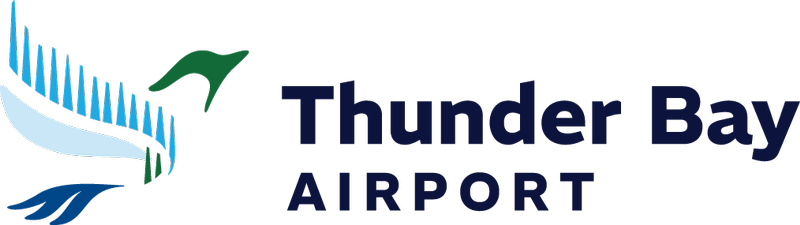

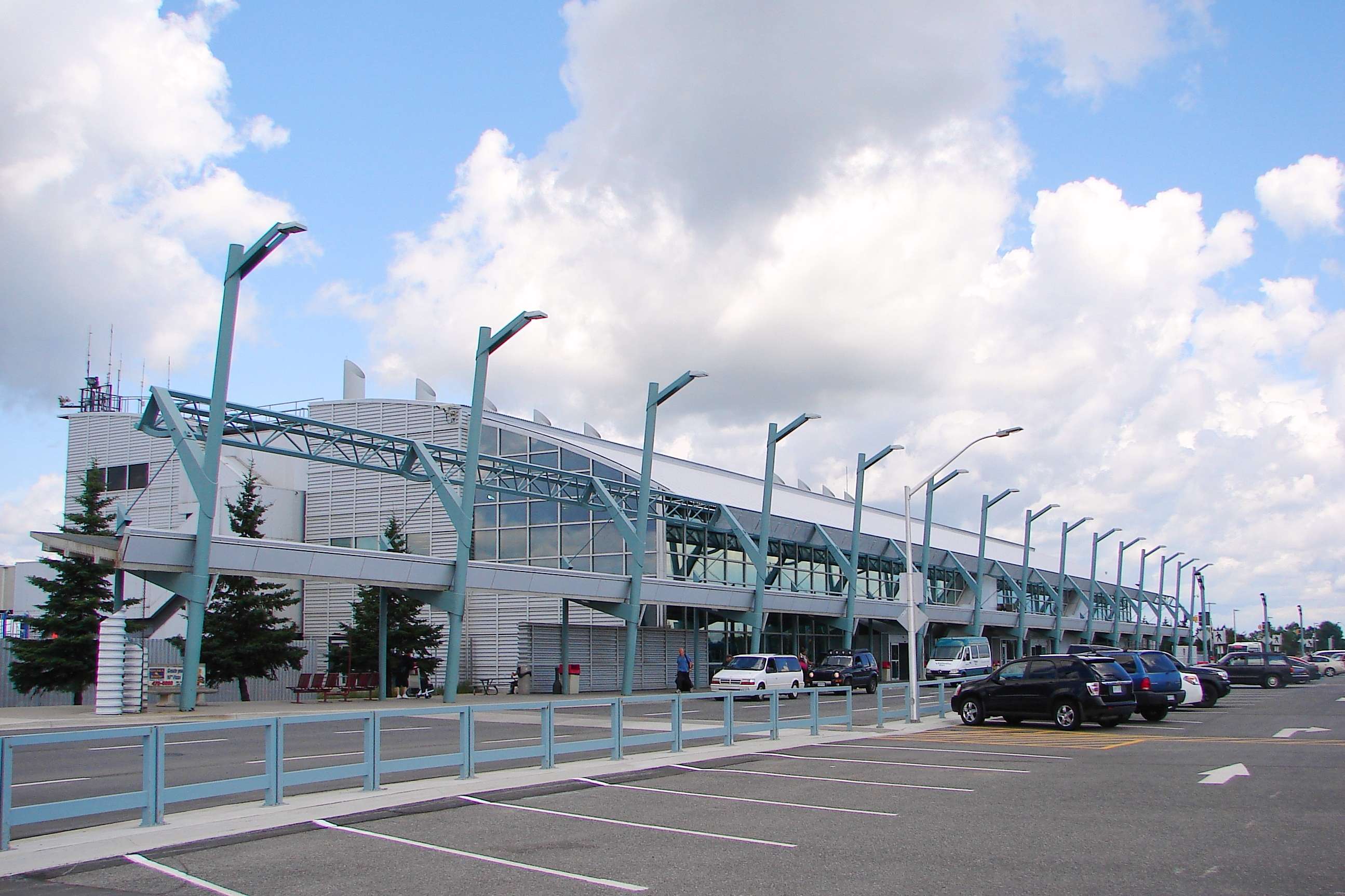
- IATA: YQT; ICAO: CYQT; WMO: 71072 (Note: Previously 71749, this is now the code for the automated weather observing system (AWOS))

Summary
- Airport type: Public
- Owner: Transport Canada (Note: Part of the National Airports System)
- Operator: Thunder Bay International Airports Authority
- Serves: Thunder Bay, Ontario
- Opened: 1938; 88 years ago
- Time zone: EST (UTC−05:00)
  - Summer (DST): EDT (UTC−04:00)
- Elevation AMSL: 654 ft (199 m)
- Coordinates: 48°22′19″N 089°19′18″W
- Public transit access: Thunder Bay Transit 14
- Website: www.flyqt.ca

Map
- Location in Ontario CYQT (Canada)

Runways
| Direction | Length | | Surface |
| Direction | ft | m | Surface |
|---|---|---|---|
| 07/25 | 7,318 | 2,231 | Asphalt |
| 12/30 | 5,297 | 1,615 | Asphalt |

Statistics (2025)
- Aircraft movements: 102,924
- Total passengers: 777,284
- Sources: Canada Flight Supplement; Environment and Climate Change Canada; Movements and passengers from Thunder Bay Airport Authority Inc.

Logo prior to 2015

Logo from 2015 to 2025

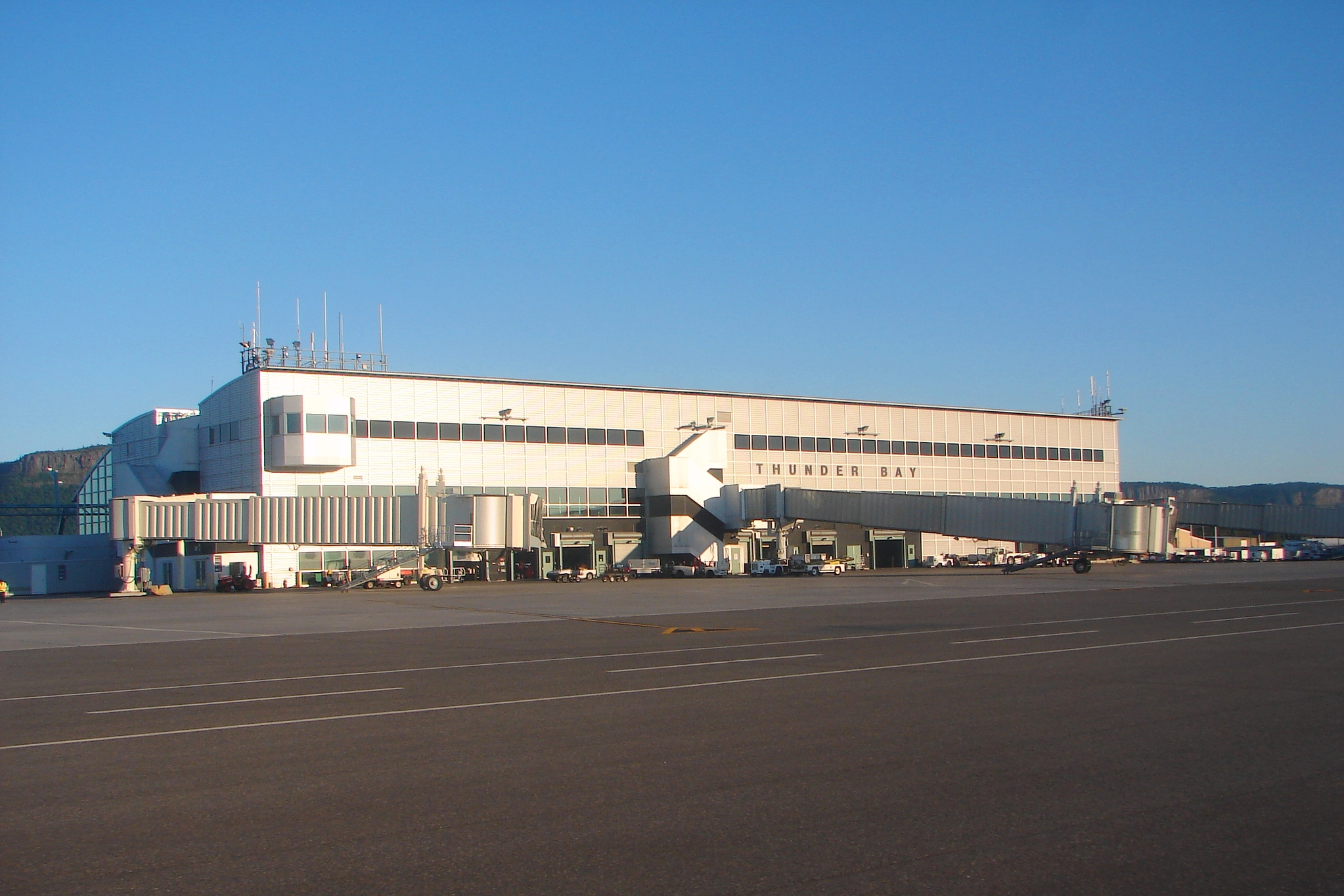
Thunder Bay airport apron side

Thunder Bay Airport (IATA: YQT, ICAO: CYQT) is in the city of Thunder Bay, Ontario, Canada. With 102,924 aircraft movements in 2025, it was the fourth busiest airport in Ontario and the 16th busiest airport in Canada. During the same year, 777,284 passengers went through the airport.

The airport is classified as an airport of entry by Nav Canada and is staffed by the Canada Border Services Agency (CBSA). CBSA officers at this airport can handle aircraft with up to 40 passengers.

The reference of "International" in the name of the Thunder Bay International Airport Authority Inc. (TBIAAI) is used for business purposes only. The TBIAAI has not sought to receive official Canadian designation as "International", in accordance with all applicable domestic and international requirements as defined by ICAO Annex 9.

== History ==
It was built as the Fort William Municipal Airport in 1938, partly as a means of relieving unemployment.

During World War II, the Thunder Bay, then RCAF Station Fort William, was home to No. 2 Elementary Flying Training School, part of the British Commonwealth Air Training Plan. The airport was also used as a base for test flights of fighter aircraft being built at the nearby Canadian Car and Foundry factory.

Before the two cities of Fort William and Port Arthur merged, it was called the Canadian Lakehead Airport.

The airport went under major renovations in 1994 with the construction of a new airport terminal building, including two jetways, a large food court, a gift shop and an arcade.

The airport was handed over from the government in 1997 to the Thunder Bay International Airports Authority, a non-profit organization. The airport handled over 600,000 passengers in 2006, for the first time since 2001.

The airport underwent a runway rehabilitation and upgrade in 2022. This was "the largest construction project undertaken in the history of the Airport Authority".

=== Historical aerodrome information ===
In approximately 1942 the aerodrome was listed as RCAF & D of T Aerodrome - Fort William, Ontario at 48°22′N 89°19′W with a variation of 01 degrees east and elevation of 645 feet (197 metres). Three runways were listed as follows:

| Runway name | Length | Width | Surface |
|---|---|---|---|
| 14/32 | 4,000 ft (1,200 m) | 500 ft (150 m) | Turf |
| 9/27 | 3,990 ft (1,220 m) | 500 ft (150 m) | Turf |
| 4/22 | 4,000 ft (1,200 m) | 500 ft (150 m) | Turf |

=== Historical airline jet service ===
A number of airlines served the airport with scheduled passenger jet service in the past from the late 1960s to the early 2000s. These air carriers along with the respective jetliner types they operated from the airfield are as follows:

- Air Canada (mainline service): Airbus A319, Boeing 727-200, McDonnell Douglas DC-9-30
- Air Ontario: Fokker F28 Fellowship
- Canadian Airlines: Boeing 737-200
- Canadian Regional Airlines: Fokker F28 Fellowship
- CanJet: Boeing 737-200
- Jetsgo: Fokker 100, McDonnell Douglas DC-9-30
- Nordair: Boeing 737-200
- North Central Airlines: McDonnell Douglas DC-9-30
- Pacific Western Airlines: Boeing 737-200
- Republic Airlines: McDonnell Douglas DC-9-30
- Transair: Boeing 737-200, Fokker F28 Fellowship
- Vistajet: Boeing 737-200

According to various Official Airline Guide (OAG) editions as well as airline timetables, the majority of jet service operated by Canadian-based air carriers was nonstop or direct to Toronto and Winnipeg. U.S.-based North Central Airlines operated nonstop flights to Duluth with continuing no change of plane jet service to O'Hare International Airport while successor Republic Airlines also flew nonstop to Duluth with continuing no change of plane jet service to Minneapolis/St. Paul and then on to Denver.

During the mid-1980s, three airlines were competing with nonstop service operated with mainline jet aircraft between Thunder Bay and Toronto: Air Canada with 737-200 Series and DC-9 Series 30 aircraft, Nordair and Pacific Western Airlines both with Boeing 737-200 aircraft.

United Express served O'Hare International Airport from Thunder Bay from February 2013 to April 2014 using the Bombardier CRJ-200. This was the most recent flight offered from Thunder Bay to the United States.

== Airlines and destinations ==
=== Passenger ===
| Airlines | Destinations |
|---|---|
| Air Canada | Toronto–Pearson |
| Air Canada Rouge | Seasonal: Toronto–Pearson |
| Bearskin Airlines | Sault Ste. Marie, Sioux Lookout, Sudbury |
| Flair Airlines | Seasonal: Toronto–Pearson |
| North Star Air | Fort Hope / Eabametoong, Kenora, Muskrat Dam, Neskantaga, Ogoki Post, Sachigo Lake, Sioux Lookout, Weagamow, Webequie |
| Porter Airlines | Ottawa, Toronto–Billy Bishop, Toronto–Pearson |
| Superior Airways | Charter: Red Lake |
| Wasaya Airways | Sioux Lookout |
| WestJet | Seasonal: Calgary, Punta Cana |
| WestJet Encore | Winnipeg |

On-demand charters and MEDEVAC (air ambulance) airlines include Air Bravo and Thunder Airlines.

=== Cargo ===
| Airlines | Destinations |
|---|---|
| Cargojet | Winnipeg |
| FedEx Feeder | Winnipeg |

== Airside tenants ==
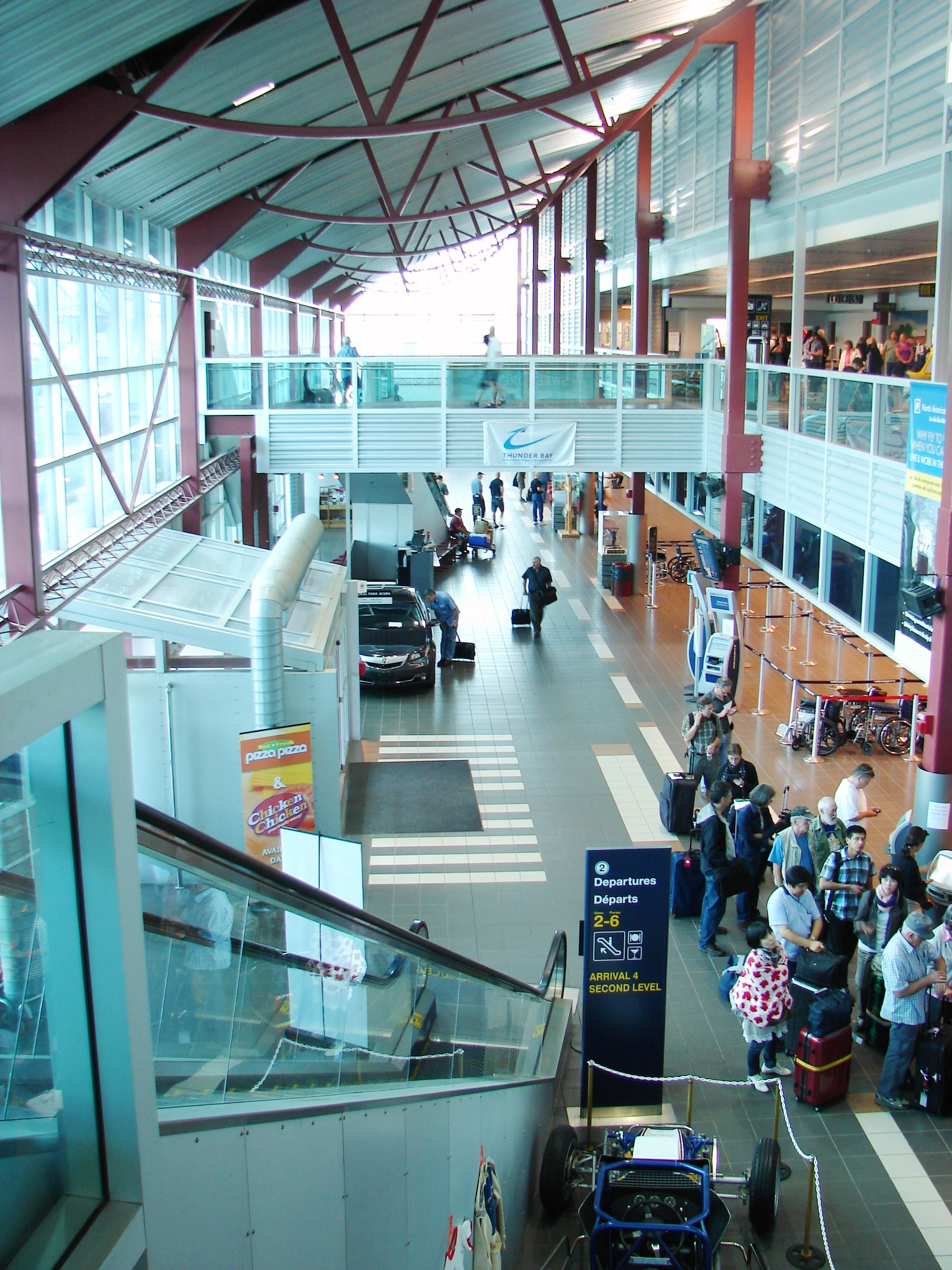
Thunder Bay Airport interior

- Confederation College School of Aviation – Aviation Centre of Excellence
- Hydro One - aviation hangar
- Innotech Aviation - Shell Aviation fixed-base operator (FBO)
- Levaero Aviation - authorized Pilatus dealer
- Maintair Aviation Services - aircraft ground handling
- Ministry of Natural Resources aviation, forest fire and emergency services - seasonal firefighting aircraft base
- Ornge Air Ambulance - hangar and regional base
- Thunder Bay Flight Refuelling - World Kinect Corporation FBO
- Wisk Air Helicopters

== Groundside tenants ==
- Aramark - groundside food services and bar, aircraft catering)
- Avis/Budget
- Driving Force
- Enterprise
- FedEx
- National
- Passages Gift Shop - featuring local gifts and items
- Pine Tree Catering - Nomad Cafe (airside food services)

== Parking and transportation ==
Vehicles can reach the airport via Ontario Highway 61 and connections with Harbour Expressway and Ontario Highway 11 into Thunder Bay's core.

The parking lot contains 100 short-term spaces, 300 long-term spaces, curbside taxi service and courtesy cars.

Thunder Bay Transit bus route 14 Arthur serves the airport terminal and the nearby Aviation Centre of Excellence. On peak hours, this airport is served every 30 minutes, and 45 minutes outside peak hours. This route connects the airport to Arthur Street and City Hall Terminal.

== Infrastructure ==
The Thunder Bay International Airport has a three-storey terminal building. Since the closure of Sears at Intercity Shopping Centre in 2018, this terminal is the only facility in Thunder Bay which uses escalators.

Thunder Bay's runways are primarily used by small or larger turboprops, similar to the De Havilland Canada Dash 8 (the Q Series (400)), and regional jet aircraft such as the Bombardier CRJ700 series, especially the CRJ900; however, they are capable of accommodating narrow-body aircraft such as the Embraer E-Jet E2 family operated by Porter Airlines, the Airbus A320 family operated by Air Canada Mainline and Air Canada Rouge and current generation Boeing 737 aircraft operated by Flair Airlines and on charter or occasional services operated by Air Transat, Sunwing Airlines and WestJet.

Historically, the airport routinely handled Boeing 727 (the 727-200 Series), Boeing 737-200 and McDonnell Douglas DC-9-30 mainline jet aircraft as well as the smaller Fokker F28 Fellowship twin jet in the past. Other larger jet aircraft types have also landed at the airport in the past with examples including a Boeing 720 operated by American Airlines in 1962, Boeing 757 (the 757-200 Series) and wide body Airbus A310 aircraft operated by Royal Aviation subsidiary Royal Airlines in 1999 and 2000, and a wide body Boeing 747SP operated as the "Global Peace Ambassadors" aircraft for Christian preacher K. A. Paul in 2005. The largest aircraft to land in Thunder Bay is the Antonov AN-124 which made four cargo trips direct from Austria between August 2017 and April 2018 with rail car parts for Bombardier.

The airport also has two fixed-base operators: Innotech Aviation Services for Shell Aviation, and Thunder Bay Flight Refuelling for World Fuel Services.

== Incidents and accidents ==
On 6 April 2009, Yavuz Berke, a 31-year-old Turkish-born Canadian student attending the Aviation Centre of Excellence at Confederation College, stole its Cessna 172 at Thunder Bay airport and went for a joy ride. He crossed into United States airspace where he was intercepted by two F-16 Fighting Falcons of the US Air Force. He later landed on U.S. Route 60.

== See also ==
- List of airports in Ontario
