= Steinbach (South) Airport =

Airport in Manitoba, Canada

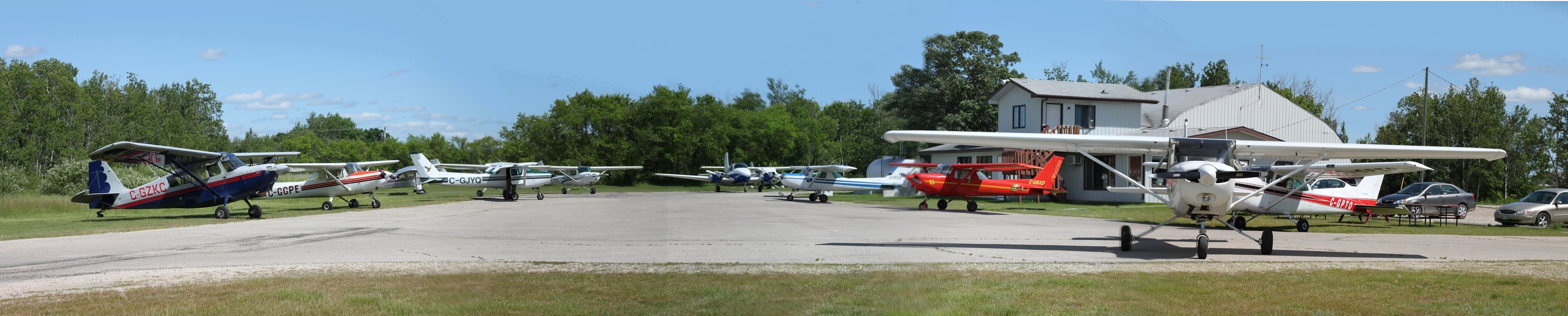
- IATA: none; ICAO: none; TC LID: CKK7

Summary
- Airport type: Private
- Operator: Harv's Air Service
- Location: RM of Hanover, near Steinbach, Manitoba
- Time zone: CST (UTC−06:00)
  - Summer (DST): CDT (UTC−05:00)
- Elevation AMSL: 888 ft / 271 m
- Coordinates: 49°29′38″N 096°41′56″W

Map
- Location in Manitoba CKK7 (Canada)

Runways
Direction	Length		Surface
Direction	ft	m	Surface
07/25	1,834	559	Grass
18/36	3,112	949	Asphalt / grass
- Source: Canada Flight Supplement

Steinbach (South) Airport (TC LID: CKK7) is located in the Rural Municipality of Hanover, Manitoba, Canada, 2 nautical miles (3.7 km; 2.3 mi) south of the city of Steinbach. The airport is operated by Harv's Air Service. Harv's Air service is a flight school based in Steinbach and also has a base in St. Andrews Airport. Steinbach (South) Airport is different from Steinbach Airport which is run by the city of Steinbach.

== Incidents ==
On July 8, 2025, two Cessna aircraft collided mid-air while attempting to land at the airport. Two pilots, the sole occupants of each aircraft, were killed.

== See also ==
- List of airports in Manitoba
- Steinbach Airport
