= Poplar Hill Airport =

Airport in Ontario, Canada

- IATA: YHP; ICAO: none; TC LID: CPV7

Summary
- Airport type: Public
- Operator: Government of Ontario - MOT
- Location: Poplar Hill First Nation
- Time zone: CST (UTC−06:00)
  - Summer (DST): CDT (UTC−05:00)
- Elevation AMSL: 1,095 ft / 334 m
- Coordinates: 52°06′48″N 094°15′20″W

Map
- Location in Ontario

Runways
| Direction | Length | | Surface |
| Direction | ft | m | Surface |
|---|---|---|---|
| 13/31 | 3,508 | 1,069 | Clay / gravel |
- Source: Canada Flight Supplement

Poplar Hill Airport (IATA: YHP, TC LID: CPV7) is a public airport located adjacent to Poplar Hill, Ontario, Canada. It is operated by the Government of Ontario - MOT.
