= Weagamow Lake =

Lake in Ontario, Canada

- Location within Ontario
- Location: Ontario
- Coordinates: 52.89585°N 91.37006°W
- Basin countries: Canada

Weagamow Lake is a lake in Kenora District in northwestern Ontario, Canada.

== See also ==
- List of lakes in Ontario
