= Sioux Lookout =

- Municipality (single-tier)
- Municipality of Sioux Lookout
- Motto: Hub of the North
- Location within Ontario Location within Canada
- Coordinates: 50°05′59″N 91°55′14″W
- Country: Canada
- Province: Ontario
- District: Kenora
- Incorporation: 1912

Government
  - Mayor: Justina Carpenter
  - Council: Councillors: Joe Cassidy; Joan Cosco; Luc Beaulne; Cory Lago; Joyce Timpson; Reece Van Breda
  - MP: Eric Melillo
  - MPPs: Sol Mamakwa

Area (2021)
  - Land: 378.02 km^{2} (145.95 sq mi)
  - Urban: 6.32 km^{2} (2.44 sq mi)
- Elevation (at airport): 383 m (1,257 ft)

Population (2021)
  - Total: 5,839
  - Density: 15.4/km^{2} (40/sq mi)
  - Urban: 3,781
  - Urban density: 598.2/km^{2} (1,549/sq mi)
- Time zone: UTC−06:00 (CST)
  - Summer (DST): UTC−05:00 (CDT)
- Forward sortation area: P8T
- Area code: 807
- Website: www.siouxlookout.ca

Sioux Lookout is a town in Northwestern Ontario, Canada, with a population of 5,838 people (up 10.8% since 2016). Known locally as the "Hub of the North", it is serviced by the Sioux Lookout Airport, Highway 72, and the Sioux Lookout railway station. According to a 2011 study commissioned by the municipality, health care and social services ranked as the largest sources of employment, followed by the retail trade, public administration, transportation and warehousing, manufacturing, accommodation and food services, and education.

Although downtown Sioux Lookout is located 71 kilometres (44 mi) from the Trans-Canada Highway, the municipality covers the ends or beginnings of provincial highways 664, 642, 516, and 72. Sioux Lookout is also a key airport hub for numerous northern and Indigenous communities in Northwestern Ontario and remains a service stop for The Canadian, a transcontinental passenger train operated by Via Rail, and a busy railway junction for the northwestern Ontario segment of Canadian National Railway's transcontinental Class 1 railroad.

Fishing camps in the area allow access to an extensive lake system fed by the English River. The town is surrounded by several beaches, including Umphreville Park, a historical site that predates the town itself. During the summer months, Sioux Lookout's population rises as tourists, mostly American, arrive to take advantage of the multitude of lakes and rivers in the area. Experienced guides, employed by the camps, can locate the best locations and also provide an educated tour of the unique land known affectionately as "sunset country".

== History ==
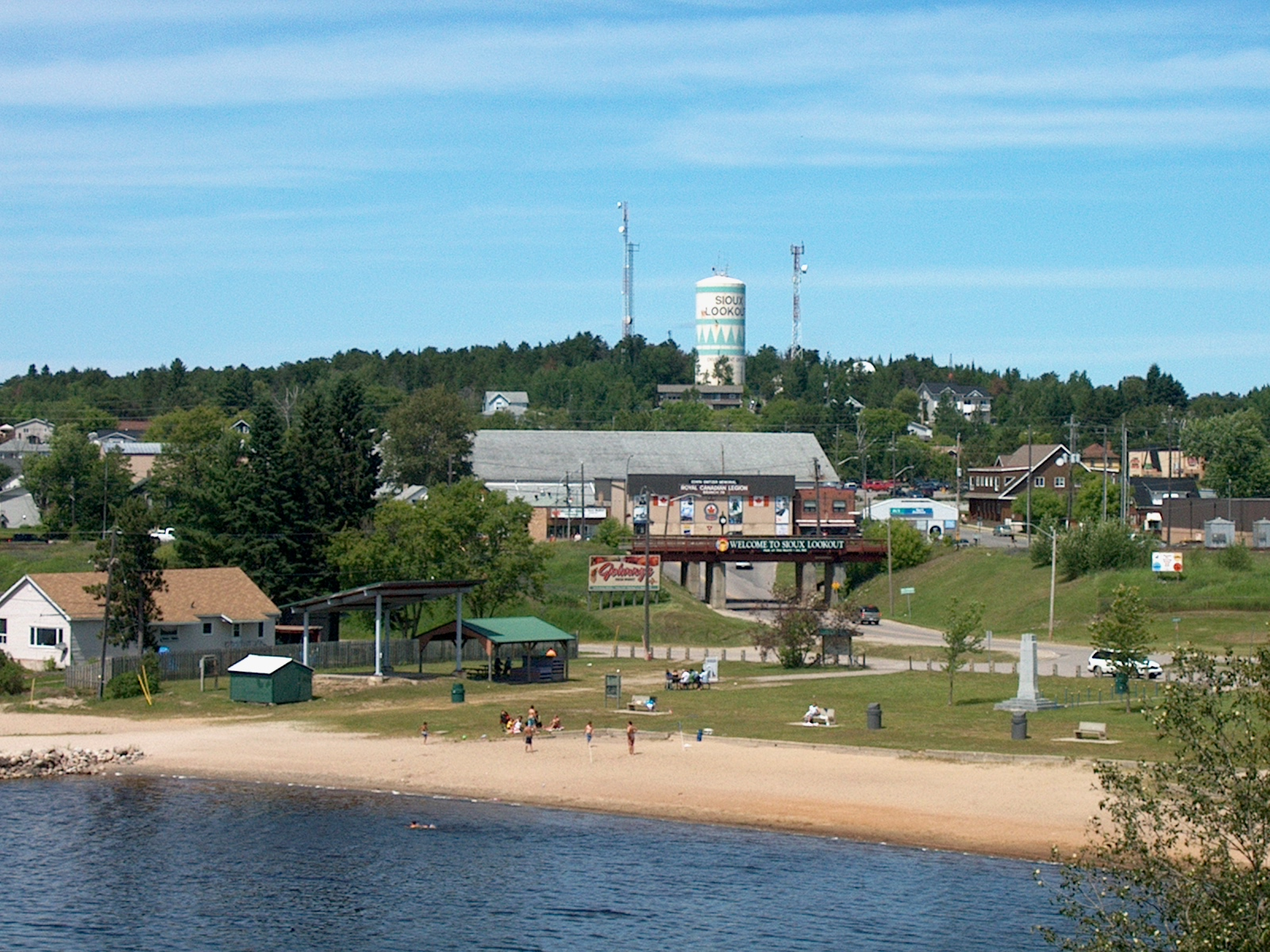
Town Beach

Sioux Lookout's name comes from a First Nations story and a local mountain, Sioux Mountain, which served as a lookout point for the Ojibwe people. Being able to scan the surrounding area for some distance enabled the Ojibwe men to potentially detect any approaching Sioux warriors, with sufficient time to guide the women and children to safety before intercepting the enemies. From Sioux Mountain, a careful eye could catch the sun reflecting off of birch bark canoes crossing the nearby rapids. Illustrating this old story on the front page of the local newspaper, "The Sioux Lookout Bulletin", is an iconic image of an Indigenous man holding a hand above his eyes as he scans the water and the surrounding terrain.

Sioux Lookout was incorporated in 1912 and was a terminal and junction on the National Transcontinental Railway. For many years, Sioux Lookout was simply a railway town. At one point, gold was discovered in Red Lake; the town subsequently became one of the leading Canadian aviation centres during the 1920s and 1930s. From circa 1933 to 1937, the Hudson's Bay Company operated a fur-trade post at the town along the English River near the north shore of Minnitaki Lake.

During the Cold War, from 1952 to 1967, CFS Sioux Lookout, 6.0 km (3.7 mi) west, was a radar base forming part of the Pinetree Line to monitor any activity from the Soviet Union.

Today, the Canadian National Railway (CNR) is a significant employer, although it is no longer the largest employer in the area, nor is the forest products industry; Sioux Lookout has become a hub of various services catering to northern First Nations communities, such as healthcare, human and social services and education, among others. Additionally, both the provincial and federal governments are major employers within Sioux Lookout. As a result, the town barely felt the effects of the recession in the early 1980s. However, more significant demographic and employment changes took place around the time of the Great Recession and 2008 financial crisis; notably, the permanent closure of the sawmill in Hudson, along with the construction of a newer, larger healthcare complex (the Meno Ya Win Health Centre), saw several shifts in the local workforce. New and different positions were subsequently made available through the Health Centre, which also brought new workers to the area.

Urban Sioux Lookout looks out on Pelican Lake, and the municipality has initiated a lakefront improvement program to beautify this area. There are now more parks, paths, and other recreational options and amenities along the lake and surrounding lands. Numerous other lakes, rivers and water-focused activities are easily accessible, by car or boat, from Sioux Lookout. Tourism makes a significant contribution to the local economy; however, there is considerable capacity for further development, and the area's potential is only beginning to be fully recognized.

== Geography ==
Sioux Lookout is located approximately 350 kilometres (220 mi) northwest of Thunder Bay, at an elevation of 383 metres (1,257 ft), and it covers an area of 536 square kilometres (207 sq mi), of which 157 square kilometres (61 sq mi) is lake and wetlands.

The boundaries of Sioux Lookout were significantly expanded on 1 January 1998 to include a number of unorganized geographic townships surrounding the town itself.

=== Communities ===
In addition to the town of Sioux Lookout itself, the municipal boundaries include the community of Hudson and the Pelican flag stop located west on the Canadian National Railway (CNR) transcontinental main line; the railway point Superior Junction located on the CNR transcontinental main line to the east; and the Alcona flag stop, located on a CNR branch line to the south east and south of Superior Junction.

=== Climate ===
Sioux Lookout experiences a humid continental climate (Dfb) with long, cold winters and short, warm summers.

The coldest temperature ever recorded was −46.1 °C (−51.0 °F) on 18 February 1966. The highest temperature ever recorded in Sioux Lookout was 39.4 °C (102.9 °F) on 29 June 1931 and 11 July 1936.

Climate data for Sioux Lookout Sioux Lookout Airport WMO ID:73017; coordinates 50°06′51″N 91°54′20″W; elevation: 338.1 m (1,109 ft); 1991–2020 normals, extremes 1914−present (Note: Climate data was recorded at Sioux Lookout from January 1914 to July 1938 and at Sioux Lookout Airport from August 1938 to present.)
Month	Jan	Feb	Mar	Apr	May	Jun	Jul	Aug	Sep	Oct	Nov	Dec	Year
Record high humidex	6.0	10.3	26.7	29.8	39.4	44.1	43.7	42.3	38.1	29.9	19.4	8.6	44.1
Record high °C (°F)	6.7 (44.1)	10.6 (51.1)	23.4 (74.1)	30.6 (87.1)	33.9 (93.0)	39.4 (102.9)	39.4 (102.9)	35.6 (96.1)	35.0 (95.0)	29.6 (85.3)	20.9 (69.6)	8.9 (48.0)	39.4 (102.9)
Mean daily maximum °C (°F)	−12.0 (10.4)	−7.8 (18.0)	−0.1 (31.8)	8.3 (46.9)	16.3 (61.3)	22.1 (71.8)	24.3 (75.7)	23.1 (73.6)	17.1 (62.8)	8.1 (46.6)	−1.2 (29.8)	−8.5 (16.7)	7.5 (45.5)
Daily mean °C (°F)	−17.2 (1.0)	−13.9 (7.0)	−6.3 (20.7)	2.3 (36.1)	10.1 (50.2)	16.2 (61.2)	18.8 (65.8)	17.7 (63.9)	12.2 (54.0)	4.3 (39.7)	−4.7 (23.5)	−12.8 (9.0)	2.2 (36.0)
Mean daily minimum °C (°F)	−22.3 (−8.1)	−19.8 (−3.6)	−12.5 (9.5)	−3.8 (25.2)	3.8 (38.8)	10.3 (50.5)	13.1 (55.6)	12.1 (53.8)	7.2 (45.0)	0.4 (32.7)	−8.2 (17.2)	−17.0 (1.4)	−3.1 (26.4)
Record low °C (°F)	−45.0 (−49.0)	−46.1 (−51.0)	−38.9 (−38.0)	−34.4 (−29.9)	−15.6 (3.9)	−5.0 (23.0)	0.6 (33.1)	−3.9 (25.0)	−14.4 (6.1)	−18.9 (−2.0)	−35.4 (−31.7)	−42.2 (−44.0)	−46.1 (−51.0)
Record low wind chill	−56.9	−53.8	−45.2	−39.9	−21.6	−3.8	0.0	−2.4	−13.7	−21.0	−46.1	−50.7	−56.9
Average precipitation mm (inches)	35.6 (1.40)	22.0 (0.87)	32.5 (1.28)	43.2 (1.70)	91.4 (3.60)	112.5 (4.43)	101.6 (4.00)	94.9 (3.74)	95.6 (3.76)	77.5 (3.05)	52.9 (2.08)	36.7 (1.44)	796.4 (31.35)
Average rainfall mm (inches)	1.2 (0.05)	1.3 (0.05)	10.0 (0.39)	21.2 (0.83)	86.8 (3.42)	112.1 (4.41)	103.6 (4.08)	92.5 (3.64)	94.5 (3.72)	60.3 (2.37)	15.2 (0.60)	1.5 (0.06)	600.2 (23.63)
Average snowfall cm (inches)	37.0 (14.6)	22.5 (8.9)	24.0 (9.4)	23.3 (9.2)	6.9 (2.7)	0.0 (0.0)	0.0 (0.0)	0.0 (0.0)	1.1 (0.4)	19.5 (7.7)	40.8 (16.1)	37.8 (14.9)	212.9 (83.8)
Average precipitation days (≥ 0.2 mm)	15.2	11.4	11.6	9.4	14.1	13.9	14.2	13.4	14.2	15.3	16.8	15.3	164.7
Average rainy days (≥ 0.2 mm)	0.9	0.8	2.7	5.3	13.6	13.9	14.3	13.3	14.1	11.6	4.1	1.4	96.0
Average snowy days (≥ 0.2 cm)	15.2	11.4	9.8	5.6	2.0	0.0	0.0	0.0	0.6	6.2	15.1	15.3	81.0
Average relative humidity (%) (at 1500 LST)	70.8	60.9	52.5	45.3	48.3	51.8	54.1	55.1	61.5	67.9	75.1	76.7	60.0
Source: Environment and Climate Change Canada (maximum from October 2023 based on incomplete data, previous record 26.7 °C [80.1 °F])

== Demographics ==
In the 2021 Canadian census conducted by Statistics Canada, Sioux Lookout had a population of 5,839 living in 2,340 of its 2,647 total private dwellings, a change of 10.8% from its 2016 population of 5,272. With a land area of 378.02 km^{2} (145.95 sq mi), it had a population density of 15.4/km^{2} (40.0/sq mi) in 2021.

Historical census populations – Sioux Lookout

Year	Pop.	±%
1921	1,127	—
1931	2,088	+85.3%
1941	1,756	−15.9%
1951	2,364	+34.6%
1956	2,504	+5.9%
1961	2,453	−2.0%

Year	Pop.	±%
1966	2,667	+8.7%
1971	2,530	−5.1%
1976	3,108	+22.8%
1981	3,074	−1.1%
1986	3,098	+0.8%
1991	3,311	+6.9%

Year	Pop.	±%
1996	5,165	+56.0%
2001	5,336	+3.3%
2006	5,183	−2.9%
2011	5,037	−2.8%
2016	5,272	+4.7%
2021	5,839	+10.8%

Population counts are not adjusted for boundary changes.
Source: Statistics Canada

As an ethnically diverse community, Sioux Lookout has a large Indigenous population (2,090 people, 1,885 First Nations and 190 Métis) along with a smaller number of individuals from all over the world.

Ethnic background	Population
non-visible minority	5,350
Indigenous	2,090
Filipino	145
South Asian	105
Chinese	80
Black	20
Arab	20
Latin American	20

In 2021, the average household size was 2.5 persons. The median household income in 2020 for Sioux Lookout was $102,000, with an after tax income of $89,000. The average age in Sioux Lookout is 39.0 years old with 38.3 for men and 39.7 for women.

== Economy ==
The main industries of Sioux Lookout are:

- Services (68%)
- Forestry (14%)
- Transportation (12%)
- Tourism (4%)

The population explodes during the spring and summer months when seasonal residents arrive. Most of Sioux Lookout's tourism comes from people wanting to experience outdoor activities. Fishing is the main tourist attraction during the summer months due to the access to numerous lakes, such as Lac Seul and Minnitaki Lake.

== Government ==
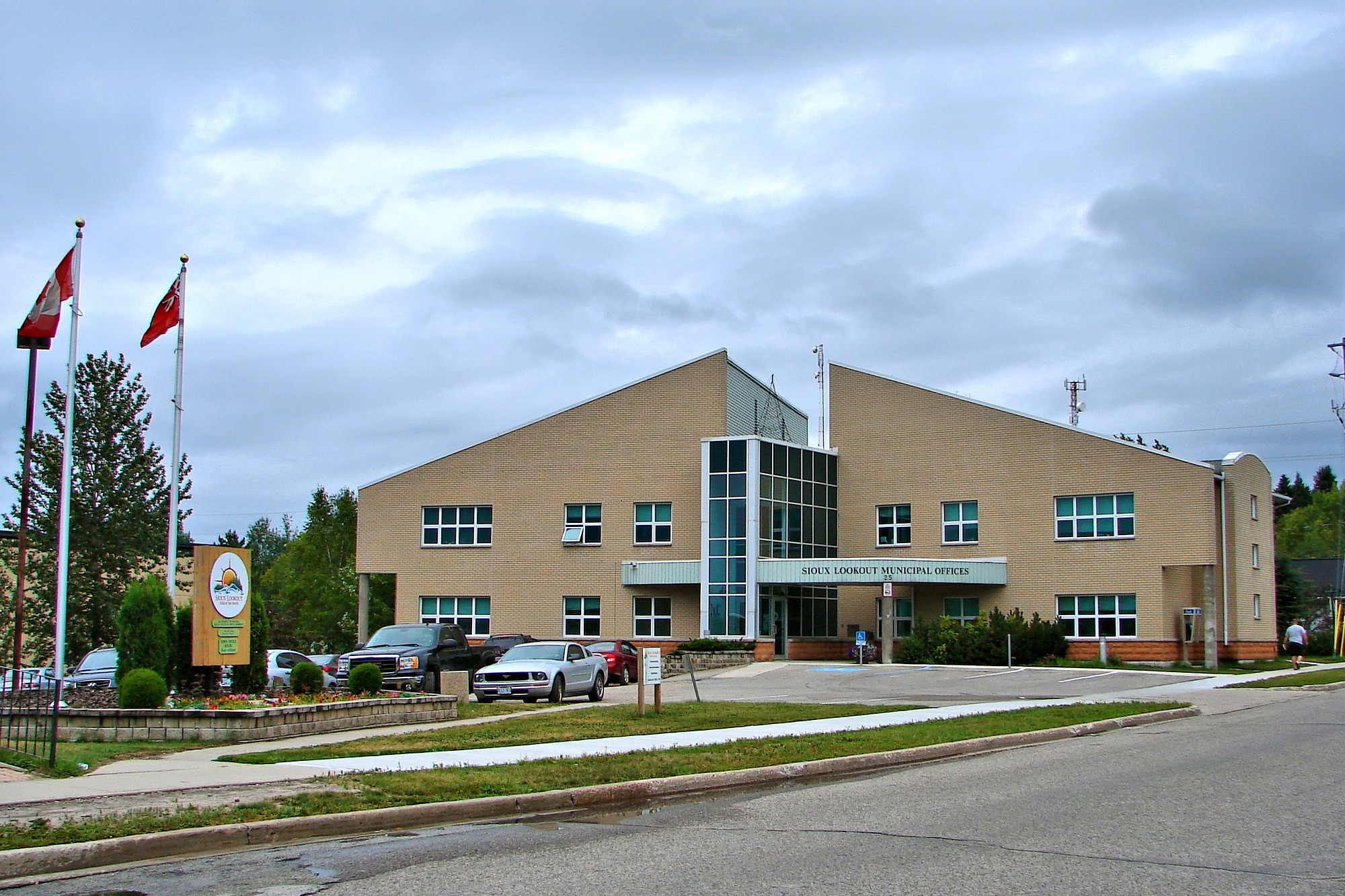
Sioux Lookout Municipal Building

Sioux Lookout elects one mayor, six "councillors-at-large". Mayor Doug Lawrance leads a council of Joe Cassidy, Cory Lago, Joyce Timpson, Joan Cosco, Luc Beaulne, Reece Van Breda.

The town is represented in the House of Commons of Canada by Conservative MP Eric Melillo in the electoral district of Kenora—Kiiwetinoong, and in the Legislative Assembly of Ontario by New Democratic Party MPP Sol Mamakwa in the electoral district of Kiiwetinoong.

== Culture ==
=== Blueberry Festival ===
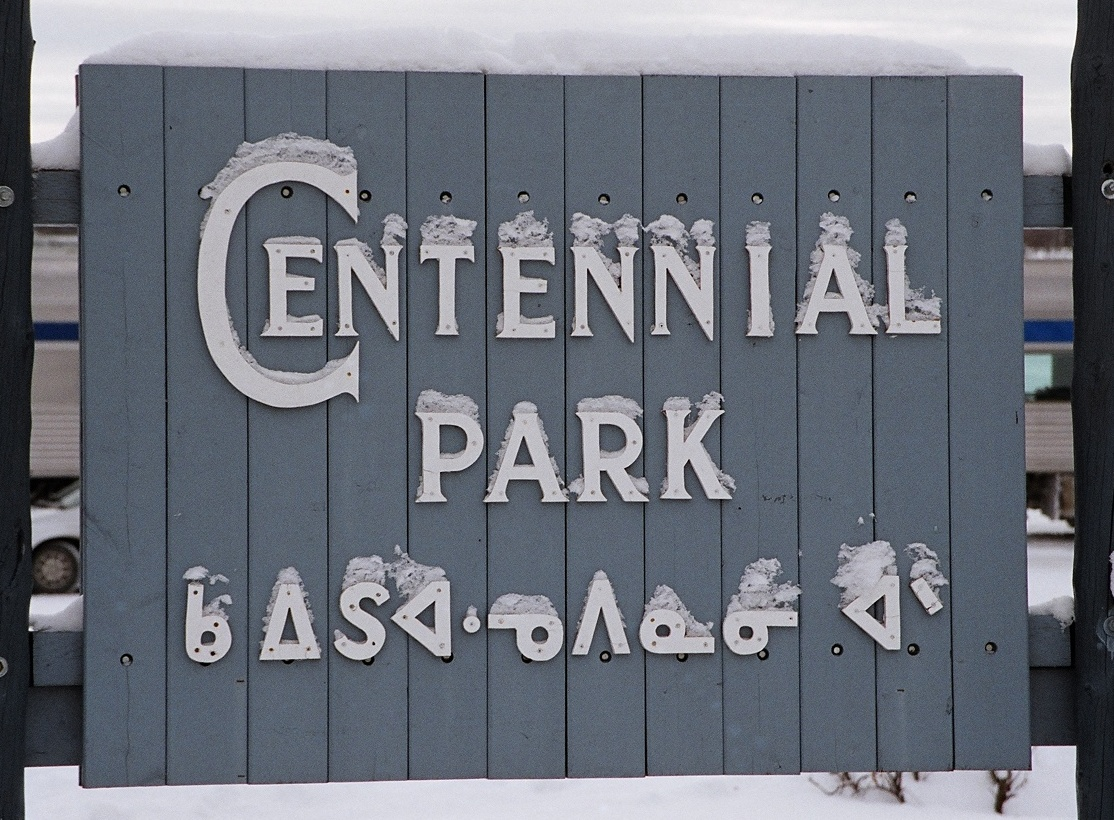
A sign at Centennial Park in Sioux Lookout, Ontario, Canada with Ojibwe syllabics

Sioux Lookout's annual Blueberry Festival has been held the first week of August since 1983. 2022 marks the 40th anniversary of the festival, which celebrates the town and its surrounding environment. The festival includes a number of sporting events (slo-pitch, beach volleyball, bocce, tennis, and golf tournaments) along with charitable fundraisers, blueberry themed food, historical walks, musical performances including the Sioux Mountain Music Festival, a car and truck show, a farmers' market, and much more. The town mascot and face of the festival, Blueberry Bert, makes frequent appearances around town throughout the duration of the festival.

=== Outdoor activities ===
Hunting and fishing are popular pastimes in Sioux Lookout. The annual Walleye Weekend Tournament, organized by the Sioux Lookout Anglers and Hunters Group, is held the second weekend of June with several cash prizes available to be won. Numerous hunting and fishing camps, as well as fly-in fishing lodges, also operate in the area. These include: Anderson's Lodge, Frog Rapids Camp, Fireside Lodge, Webster's Lodge and Moosehorn Lodge among many others.

Ecotourism is growing rapidly with outfitters such as Goldwater Expeditions providing kayak, ski, and snowshoe rentals while also providing ecology based adventures, cultural education, and ecological interpretation.

=== Sites of interest ===
- Sioux Mountain
- Cedar Bay Recreational Facilities
- Ojibway Provincial Park

=== Arts ===
Sioux Lookout is home to a creative habitat, encouraging creatives to pursue and grow in their craft.

==== Literature ====
Peggy Sanders, awarded the Order of Canada in October 2006, is Sioux Lookout's leading literary figure. She was praised by the Governor-General for "bridging cultures...and building relationships between Aboriginal and non-Aboriginal communities for decades". She continued to note that Sanders was: "a founding member of the local anti-racism committee...and has championed literacy by founding the town's first public library." Patricia Ningewance Nadeau, from the Lac Seul First Nation, is on the board of directors at the Indigenous Language Institute. She has published a textbook on the Ojibwe language: Talking Gookom's Language and five other books. She was the first editor of Wawatay News in Sioux Lookout.

Richard Schwindt, former resident of Sioux Lookout, published a collection of short stories titled Dreams and Sioux Nights in 2003. Most of the characters and settings are based upon Sioux Lookout and the surrounding area.

Phillip Neault-Pioneer is a collection of songs and stories told by Mae Carroll to her grandchildren. Her book, edited by James R. Stevens, takes place in the two railroad towns of Fort William and Sioux Lookout in pioneer times.

The Sioux Lookout Anti-Racism Committee was a winner of the 23rd Annual Human Rights Media Awards, presented by the League for Human Rights of B'nai Brith Canada, for "their web site which deals with the effects and strategies of dealing with issues of racism and resources and strategies to deal with instances of racism".

The town also appears as a prominent figure in the novel, The Cunning Man by Robertson Davies.

Sioux Lookout is also a feature in Paulette Jiles' novel North Spirit: Travels Among the Cree and Ojibway Nations and Their Star Maps published in 1995 by Doubleday Canada.

==== Music ====
Lawrence Martin, a Juno Award-winning musician, was the mayor of Sioux Lookout during the 1990s. Martin is now mayor of Cochrane, and was once a member of the TVOntario board of directors. Also, a concert series called S.L.Y.M (Sioux Lookout Youth Music) Productions supplies the town with local and out-of- town bands for the town's ear drums. To date, S.L.Y.M has featured the local bands of Darkness Deprived, Red Radio, Double Helix, and The Four Ohms. S.L.Y.M. also regularly hosts open coffee houses to showcase local acoustic talent. The Sioux Lookout Cultural Centre for Youth and the Arts is under construction and will include a recording studio for aspiring local artists.

==== Film ====
Sioux Lookout appears as the setting for the fictional town Autumn Springs, in the film of the same name, "Autumn Springs."

=== Sports ===
Sioux Lookout was home to the Sioux Lookout Flyers, a Junior A team in the Superior International Junior Hockey League, which folded in 2012. Also hosted every year is a First Nations hockey tournament.

Ryan Parent, first round National Hockey League (NHL) draft pick and two-time IIHF World Junior Championship champion, was raised in Sioux Lookout. Parent returns to his home town during the off-season. As a member of the Canadian World Juniors team, Parent won two consecutive gold medals in 2006 and 2007. He was a first-round draft pick (18th overall) of the Nashville Predators in the 2005 NHL entry draft and was traded to the Philadelphia Flyers on 17 February 2007. Ryan Parent officially joined the NHL when he was recalled from the Flyer's American Hockey League (AHL) affiliate team the Philadelphia Phantoms on 13 February 2008 and took a place on the roster.

The Sioux Lookout Bombers is a junior ice hockey franchise of the Superior International Junior Hockey League (SIJHL) based in Sioux Lookout, Ontario, Canada. It debuted as an expansion franchise in the 2022–23 SIJHL season.

== Infrastructure ==
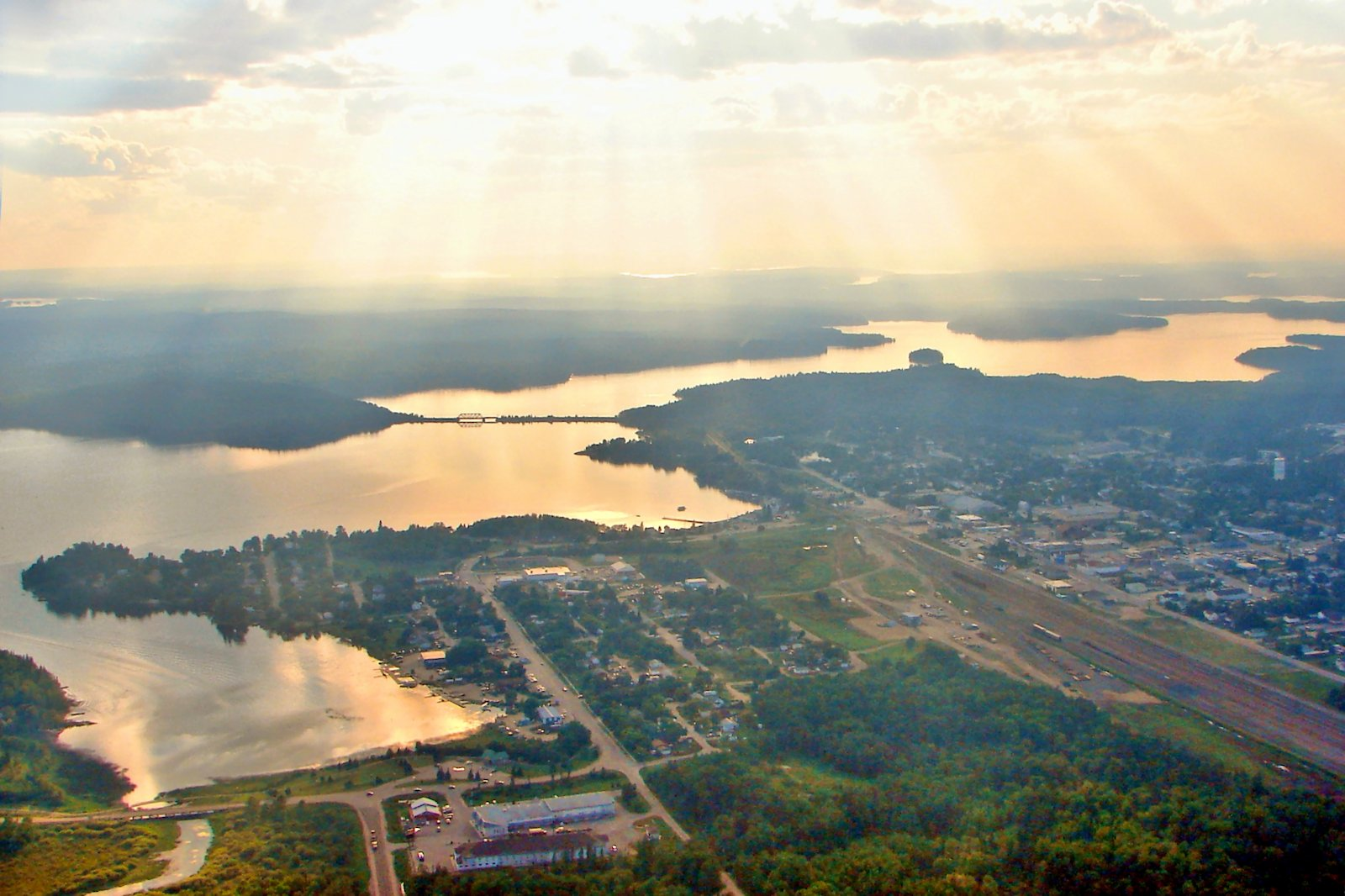
Aerial view of Sioux Lookout

New residential zones have been created in response to Sioux Lookout's continued population growth (which is one of the highest rates in Northern Ontario). In the past decade, Sioux Lookout has renovated its train station and built several new buildings including a new elementary school, a new high school, grocery store, youth centre, court house, hospital, and clinic.

=== Health and medicine ===
The new Sioux Lookout Meno-Ya-Win Health Centre opened its doors to patients in late 2010. The 13,000 m^{2} (140,000 sq ft) hospital has brought many health care services together under one roof. The building complex provides Sioux Lookout, as well as 29 northern communities, with healthcare services. The catchment area for the health centre covers an area larger than France. The health centre—including a hospital, long term care facility, and community services—is characterized by its unique blending of mainstream and traditional Indigenous care. It has been designated as Ontario's centre of excellence for First Nations' healthcare.

=== Transportation ===
Sioux Lookout Airport was opened in 1933; at the time it was the second busiest airport in North America next to Chicago. Today, the airport is a mini-hub facilitating travel to and from all northern communities in Northwestern Ontario. Ornge, Ontario's air ambulance service, operates a base at the airport. Bearskin Airlines, SkyCare Air Ambulance, Slate Falls Airways, North Star Air, Bamaji Air Service, Perimeter Aviation and Wasaya Airways all operate out of the airport.

Via Rail which operates on the CN line connects travellers from downtown Sioux Lookout to the rest of Canada. Also, Kasper Bus lines services Sioux Lookout to its neighbouring communities from Thunder Bay, to Winnipeg, carrying freight and passengers to their destinations.

== Education ==
=== Post-secondary ===
While Confederation College is based in Thunder Bay, it operates several campuses across northwestern Ontario, which include a campus in Sioux Lookout within the site of Sioux North High School. The college offers various programs for students wishing to continue their post-secondary education. Nursing, Business, Social Service, and Mechanical Techniques are just some of the programs available at the Sioux Lookout campus.

=== Secondary education ===
Keewatin-Patricia District School Board's Sioux North High School, located at 86 3rd Avenue provides secondary education to Sioux Lookout residents as well as to many students from remote northern First Nations communities. It replaced Queen Elizabeth District High School in 2019. It is the only high school (public or Catholic) within Sioux Lookout.

=== Elementary and other education centres ===
Sioux Lookout has two major elementary schools: Sioux Mountain Public School of the Keewatin-Patricia District School Board and Sacred Heart School of the Northwest Catholic District School Board.

Other schools in the area include Cornerstone Christian Academy and Pelican Falls First Nations High School.

Hudson Public School in Hudson, Ontario was closed in 2011 by the Keewatin-Patricia District School Board and now used as Lac Seul Centre of Training Excellence. The closest elementary school near Hudson is Obishkokaang Elementary School on the north side of Lost Lake and serves students from the Lac Seul First Nation. Public school students in Hudson now must travel to Sioux Lookout.

== Media ==
=== Newspaper ===
- Sioux Lookout Bulletin

=== Radio ===
- FM 89.9 - CKWT-FM, Wawatay Radio Network, First Nations community
- FM 91.9 - CIDE-FM, Wawatay Radio Network, First Nations community
- FM 95.3 - CBLS-FM, CBC Radio One (rebroadcaster of CBQT-FM Thunder Bay)
- FM 97.1 - CKDR-FM-2, adult contemporary (rebroadcaster of CKDR-FM Dryden)
- FM 104.5 - CKQV-FM-3, classic hits (rebroadcaster of CKQV-FM Vermilion Bay)
