= North Spirit Lake First Nation =

North Spirit Lake
- Indian reserve
- North Spirit Lake Indian Reserve
- Location within Ontario
- Coordinates: 52°29′N 93°02′W
- Country: Canada
- Province: Ontario
- District: Kenora
- First Nation: North Spirit Lake

Area
  - Land: 19.50 km^{2} (7.53 sq mi)

Population (2011)
  - Total: 263
  - Density: 13.5/km^{2} (35/sq mi)
- Website: firstnation.ca/north-spirit-lake/

North Spirit Lake First Nation (Oji-Cree: ᒣᒣᑴᔑ ᓴᑲᐦᐃᑲᐣ) is a small Anisininew First Nation reserve in Northern Ontario, located north of Red Lake, Ontario. It is connected to Sandy Lake First Nation, and Deer Lake First Nation by winter/ice roads. It is part of the Keewaytinook Okimakanak Council (Northern Chiefs) and the Nishnawbe Aski Nation.

North Spirit Lake is policed by the Nishnawbe-Aski Police Service, an Aboriginal-based service.
