= Deer Lake Airport (Ontario) =

- IATA: YVZ; ICAO: CYVZ

Summary
- Airport type: Public
- Operator: Government of Ontario
- Location: Deer Lake, Ontario
- Time zone: CST (UTC−06:00)
  - Summer (DST): CDT (UTC−05:00)
- Elevation AMSL: 1,092 ft / 333 m
- Coordinates: 52°39′21″N 094°03′41″W

Map
- Location in Ontario

Runways
Direction	Length		Surface
Direction	ft	m	Surface
13/31	3,506	1,069	Gravel
- Source: Canada Flight Supplement

Deer Lake Airport (IATA: YVZ, ICAO: CYVZ) is located 3 nautical miles (5.6 km; 3.5 mi) north of Deer Lake, Ontario, Canada. The airport has one runway, Runway 13/31, which is 3,506 ft x 100 ft (1069 m x 30 m) long.

== See also ==
- Deer Lake Water Aerodrome
- Deer Lake/Keyamawun Water Aerodrome
