= List of airports in Ontario =

This is a list of airports in Ontario. It includes all Nav Canada certified and registered water and land airports, aerodromes and heliports in the Canadian province of Ontario. Airport names in italics are part of the National Airports System.

Ontario

== List of airports and heliports ==
The list is sorted by the name of the community served; click the sort buttons in the table header to switch listing order.

Community	Airport name	PU PR MI	AOE (Note: An airport of entry has four different categories. An AOE which can accept "all classes of scheduled and non-scheduled aircraft (passenger and cargo)." An AOE/# which can handle aircraft in the previous category but up to maximum number. This number can be exceeded if done in stages as shown in parentheses. An AOE/15 that can accept general aviation aircraft with a maximum of 15 passengers. An AOE/CAN which can handle aircraft subject to the CANPASS regulations.)	Operator	Elevation	ICAO	TC LID	IATA	Image	Coordinates
Ajax	Ajax-Pickering General Hospital Heliport	PR		Lakeridge Health	301 ft (92 m)		CPE2			43°50′09″N 79°01′03″W
Ajax	Ajax (PR Ajax) Aerodrome	PR		1000363870 Ontario Inc.	460 ft (140 m)		CAJ5			43°54′24″N 79°02′50″W
Alban	French River/Alban Aerodrome	PR		Gavin Sargeant	711 ft (217 m)		CFR5			46°05′36″N 80°36′15″W
Alexandria	Alexandria Aerodrome	PU		Alexandria Aviation	260 ft (79 m)		CNS4			45°20′00″N 74°37′00″W
Algoma Mills	Algoma Mills Water Aerodrome	PR		Lauzon Aviation	602 ft (183 m)		CPN6			46°11′18″N 82°49′28″W
Allan Park	Allan Park Aerodrome	PR		Greg Robinson	926 ft (282 m)		CAP2			46°11′00″N 82°50′00″W
Alliston	Alliston Airport	PR		Kim & Sylvia Murphy	720 ft (220 m)		CNY4			44°11′00″N 79°50′00″W
Alliston	Alliston Heliport	PR		USCAN Aviation Sales	760 ft (230 m)		CPJ2			44°08′54″N 79°48′03″W
Alliston	Alliston (Stevenson Memorial Hospital) Heliport	PR		Stevenson Memorial Hospital	750 ft (230 m)		CPZ2			44°09′19″N 79°52′27″W
Almonte	Almonte (General Hospital) Heliport	PR		Almonte General Hospital	440 ft (130 m)		CAL5			45°13′49″N 76°11′14″W
Apsley (Chandos Lake)	Chandos Lake/Sciuk's Landing Water Aerodrome	PR		Phil Sciuk	1,037 ft (316 m)		CCL5			44°48′17″N 77°58′15″W
Armstrong	Armstrong Airport	PU		Government of Ontario	1,059 ft (323 m)	CYYW		YYW		50°17′38″N 88°54′36″W
Armstrong	Armstrong Water Aerodrome	PU		Armstrong Outposts; Huron Air & Outfitters	1,120 ft (340 m)		CJF6			50°15′00″N 89°03′00″W
Arnprior	Arnprior Airport	PU	CANPASS	Arnprior Airport Commission	355 ft (108 m)		CNP3			45°24′49″N 76°21′57″W
Arnprior	Arnprior Water Aerodrome	PU		Arnprior Airport Commission	330 ft (100 m)		CNB5			45°24′27″N 76°21′35″W
Arthur	Arthur (Damascus Field) Aerodrome	PU		Roger Deming	1,580 ft (480 m)		CDF6			43°53′48″N 80°31′12″W
Arthur	Arthur (Peskett Field) Aerodrome	PR		David George Pryor	1,555 ft (474 m)		CPK9			43°46′15″N 80°29′06″W
Arthur	Arthur (Walter's Field) Aerodrome	PR		York Soaring Association	1,550 ft (470 m)		CPC3			43°51′00″N 80°27′00″W
Astorville	Astorville/Lake Nosbonsing Water Aerodrome	PR		Ron Cooke	778 ft (237 m)		CLN5			46°12′10″N 79°14′24″W
Atikokan	Atikokan (General Hospital) Heliport	PR		Atikokan General Hospital	1,285 ft (392 m)		CKF3			48°45′17″N 91°35′48″W
Atikokan	Atikokan Municipal Aerodrome	PU		Atikokan Township	1,409 ft (429 m)	CYIB		YIB		48°46′27″N 91°38′20″W
Atikokan	Atikokan Water Aerodrome	PU		Township of Atikokan	1,296 ft (395 m)		CJH6			48°46′00″N 91°40′00″W
Attawapiskat First Nation	Attawapiskat Airport	PU		Government of Ontario	30 ft (9.1 m)	CYAT		YAT		52°55′39″N 82°25′55″W
Atwood	Atwood/Coghlin Airport	PU		Coghlin Aviation	1,215 ft (370 m)		CAT1			43°41′00″N 81°00′16″W
Ayr	Ayr/Eagle Valley Private Airfield	PR		Gavin Sargeant	970 ft (300 m)		CAY5			43°18′21″N 80°29′57″W
Bala	Bala (Medora Lake) Aerodrome	PR		Ron Brent	825 ft (251 m)		CME3			45°03′51″N 79°40′47″W
Bala	Bala Aerodrome	PR		Ron Brent	814 ft (248 m)		CBL8			45°01′51″N 79°37′05″W
Bala (Gibson Lake)	Bala/Gibson Lake Water Aerodrome	PR		Graham Nierop	635 ft (194 m)		CGL3			44°56′55″N 79°43′34″W
Bala	Bala/Muskoka Float Flying Club Water Aerodrome	PU		Bruce Clark	739 ft (225 m)		CBA6			45°02′08″N 79°23′19″W
Bala (Lake Muskoka)	Lake Muskoka/Dudley Bay Water Aerodrome	PR		Nancy Mills	739 ft (225 m)		CNT5			45°01′59″N 79°36′07″W
Baldwin	Baldwin Airport	PU		I.P.C.F. Baldwin Airport	750 ft (230 m)		CPB9			44°16′02″N 79°20′26″W
Baldwin	Baldwin West Aerodrome	PR		Donald Williams	750 ft (230 m)		CBW8			44°16′39″N 79°21′42″W
Bancroft	Bancroft Airport	PU		Bancroft Flying Club	1,085 ft (331 m)		CNW3			45°04′23″N 77°52′50″W
Bancroft	Bancroft (North Hastings District Hospital) Heliport	PR		Quinte Health Care	1,085 ft (331 m)		CPB7			45°04′17″N 77°52′44″W
Barrie	Barrie/Grenfel Field Aerodrome	PR		Joseph Matys	75 ft (23 m)		CGF7			44°21′12″N 79°47′27″W
Barrie	Lake Simcoe Regional Airport (Barrie-Orillia (Lake Simcoe Regional) Airport)	PU	24	County of Simcoe	972 ft (296 m)	CYLS		YLK		44°29′07″N 79°33′20″W
Barrie	Barrie (Royal Victoria Hospital) Heliport	PR		Royal Victoria Regional Health Centre	855 ft (261 m)		CRV2			44°24′52″N 79°39′57″W
Bar River	Bar River Airport	PR	CANPASS	Springer Aerospace	593 ft (181 m)		CPF2			46°25′08″N 84°05′54″W
Bar River	Bar River Water Aerodrome	PR	CANPASS (SEA)	Springer Aerospace	580 ft (180 m)		CNE5			46°25′00″N 84°06′00″W
Barry's Bay	Barry's Bay (St. Francis Memorial Hospital) Heliport	PR		St. Francis Memorial Hospital	1,000 ft (300 m)		CPV6			45°28′55″N 77°41′44″W
Barry's Bay (Madawaska Valley)	Barry's Bay/Madawaska Valley Airpark	PR		Dr. H, H. Chapeskie	1,000 ft (300 m)		CNZ4			45°30′00″N 77°39′00″W
Beardmore	Beardmore (Health Centre) Heliport	PR		Municipality of Greenstone	1,015 ft (309 m)		CPY3			49°36′29″N 87°57′18″W
Bearskin Lake First Nation	Bearskin Lake Airport	PU		Government of Ontario	800 ft (240 m)		CNE3	XBE		53°57′56″N 91°01′38″W
Beeton	Beeton Field Aerodrome	PR		Terry Cleland	787 ft (240 m)		CBF3			44°04′45″N 79°48′38″W
Belleville	Belleville (Marker Field) Aerodrome	PR		D. Byrd	320 ft (98 m)		CNU4			44°11′32″N 77°18′34″W
Belleville	Belleville (QHC) Heliport	PU		Quinte Health Care	277 ft (84 m)		CBV5			44°10′02″N 77°21′01″W
Belwood	Belwood (Baird Field) Aerodrome	PR		David Baird	1,410 ft (430 m)		CBF2			43°48′30″N 80°18′43″W
Belwood	Belwood (Heurisko Pond) Water Aerodrome	PR		David Hurlburt	1,420 ft (430 m)		CHP2			43°48′20″N 80°22′26″W
Bethany	Bethany/Whitetail Valley Farm Aerodrome	PR		Brian Shury	1,051 ft (320 m)		CVF3			44°12′59″N 78°33′16″W
Blackstock	Blackstock/Martyn Aerodrome	PR		Jim Martyn	1,000 ft (300 m)		CBM2			44°05′41″N 78°44′11″W
Bobcaygeon	Bobcaygeon/Chesher Lakehurst Aerodrome	PR		Jeff Chesher	892 ft (272 m)		CLH5			44°31′32″N 78°26′53″W
Bolton	Bolton Heliport	PR		National Helicopter	700 ft (210 m)		CNB2			43°51′08″N 79°41′41″W
Bowmanville	Bowmanville Haines St. Hospital Heliport	PR		Lakeridge Health	290 ft (88 m)		CLH8			43°54′23″N 78°39′50″W
Bracebridge	Bracebridge (Goltz Farm) Aerodrome	PR		Andrew Goltz	850 ft (260 m)		CBG3			45°06′02″N 79°25′59″W
Bracebridge	Bracebridge (South Muskoka Memorial Hospital) Heliport	PR		South Muskoka Memorial Hospital	870 ft (270 m)		CPL2			45°02′55″N 79°18′55″W
Bracebridge	Bracebridge (Stone Wall Farm) Aerodrome	PR		Gerald Vandertas	1,050 ft (320 m)		CSW4			44°59′19″N 79°11′22″W
Bracebridge	Bracebridge (Tinkham Field) Aerodrome	PR		Dale Tinkham	780 ft (240 m)		CTA6			45°00′23″N 79°24′48″W
Bracebridge	Bracebridge West Aerodrome	PR		Randy Evans	755 ft (230 m)		CWB2			45°03′33″N 79°24′00″W
Bracebridge (Lake Muskoka)	Lake Muskoka/Alport Bay Water Aerodrome	PR		Larry Miller	739 ft (225 m)		CLM3			45°01′16″N 79°22′58″W
Bracebridge (Lake Muskoka)	Lake Muskoka/Boyd Bay Water Aerodrome	PU		Robert Murray Walker	739 ft (225 m)		CBB3			45°03′05″N 79°24′32″W
Bracebridge (Lake Muskoka)	Lake Muskoka/Cottage Air Water Aerodrome	PR		Cottage Air	739 ft (225 m)		CCA4			45°00′01″N 79°24′20″W
Bracebridge (Lake Muskoka)	Lake Muskoka East (Milford Bay) Water Aerodrome	PR		Graham Wishart	739 ft (225 m)		CLM7			45°01′48″N 79°25′56″W
Bracebridge (Lake Muskoka)	Lake Muskoka/Spirit Bay Water Aerodrome	PU		Spirit Bay Harbour Marina	739 ft (225 m)		CCB9			45°02′53″N 79°23′26″W
Bradford	Bradford Aerodrome	PU		E. Maslak	973 ft (297 m)		CPM7			44°08′10″N 79°37′44″W
Brampton	Brampton-Caledon Airport	PU	CANPASS	Brampton Flying	936 ft (285 m)		CNC3			43°45′37″N 79°52′30″W
Brampton	Brampton (National "D") Heliport	PR		National Helicopter	780 ft (240 m)		CPC4			43°50′00″N 79°42′03″W
Brantford	Brantford Airport	PU	15	City of Brantford	815 ft (248 m)	CYFD		YFD		43°07′53″N 80°20′33″W
Brechin	Brechin/Ronan Aircraft Aerodrome (Note: Includes a 2,000 ft (610 m) long water runway.)	PR		Doug Ronan Aircraft Sales	740 ft (230 m)		CDU7			44°34′17″N 79°13′26″W
Brockville	Brockville Regional Tackaberry Airport	PU	CANPASS	Brock Air Services	404 ft (123 m)		CNL3	XBR		44°38′22″N 75°45′01″W
Bruce Mines	Bruce Mines/Kerr Field Aerodrome	PR		Dan & Pat Kerr	700 ft (210 m)		CBM3			46°20′18″N 83°42′40″W
Brussels	Brussels (Armstrong Field) Airport	PU		W.J. Armstrong	1,100 ft (340 m)		CPD4			43°45′00″N 81°14′00″W
Buckhorn (Buckhorn Lake)	Buckhorn/Upper Buckhorn Lake Water Arodrome	PR		David Gage	804 ft (245 m)		CUB2			44°31′38″N 78°21′27″W
Burditt Lake	Burditt Lake Water Aerodrome	PU		Ross Air	1,150 ft (350 m)		CJC7			48°55′10″N 93°48′08″W
Burk's Falls	Burk's Falls/Katrine (Three Mile Lake) Water Aerodrome	PR		Bruce Klassen	1,135 ft (346 m)		CTM5			45°35′13″N 79°18′04″W
Burleigh Falls	Burleigh Falls/Breeze Island Water Aerodrome	PR		Alvin McMillan	771 ft (235 m)		CBI3			44°33′50″N 78°06′03″W
Burlington	Burlington/Hamilton Harbour Water Aerodrome	PR		Peter Stewart	243 ft (74 m)		CHH2			44°17′56″N 79°50′59″W
Burlington	Burlington Executive Airport	PU	CANPASS	Vince Rossi	601 ft (183 m)	CZBA				43°26′30″N 79°51′01″W
Burwash	Paddy Lake Water Aerodrome	PR		Guy Langevin	775 ft (236 m)		CPL8			46°20′10″N 80°55′32″W
Cambridge (Puslinch Lake)	Cambridge (Puslinch Lake) Water Aerodrome	PU		Ron & Yvonne Harper	1,000 ft (300 m)		CMB3			43°25′14″N 80°15′25″W
Cambridge	Cambridge/Reid's Field Airport	PR		Reid's Heritage Homes	1,050 ft (320 m)		CPE4			43°26′34″N 80°13′56″W
Camden East	Camden East Aerodrome	PU		Art Ottenhof	525 ft (160 m)		CCE6			44°19′33″N 76°47′33″W
Camden East	Camden East/Varty Lake Aerodrome	PR		Bruno Claus Doerwald	480 ft (150 m)		CVL3			44°24′32″N 76°48′19″W
Cameron	Cameron/Arbour Airfield	PR		Neil Arbour	853 ft (260 m)		CAR4			44°28′59″N 78°44′13″W
Campbellville	Campbellville (Bellshill Airpark) Aerodrome	PU		Bellshill Airpark	950 ft (290 m)		CMB5			43°25′54″N 80°01′31″W
Carey Lake	Carey Lake Airport	PR		Hearst Air Service - Melanie Veilleux	837 ft (255 m)		CNX3			49°45′00″N 84°02′00″W
Carleton Place	Carleton Place Airport	PR		M & A Horton	450 ft (140 m)		CNR6			45°06′14″N 76°07′24″W
Carnarvon	Carnarvon/Kushog Lake Water Aerodrome	PR		Brent Heise	1,089 ft (332 m)		CKA7			45°02′42″N 78°45′40″W
Carnarvon	Carnarvon/Whistlewing Aerodrome	PR		Patrick Losier	1,171 ft (357 m)		CRV3			45°02′18″N 78°45′52″W
Carp	Carp Airport (Ottawa/Carp Airport)	PU	CANPASS	West Capital Developments	384 ft (117 m)	CYRP		YRP		45°19′21″N 76°01′20″W
Casselman	Casselman/Nation River Water Aerodrome	PR		7221479 Camada Inc.	197 ft (60 m)		CAS6			45°17′12″N 75°07′45″W
Cat Lake First Nation	Cat Lake Airport	PU		Government of Ontario	1,344 ft (410 m)	CYAC		YAC		51°43′38″N 91°49′28″W
Cayuga	Cayuga (Bruce Field) Aerodrome	PR		David Bruce	627 ft (191 m)		CCG5			42°57′04″N 79°49′30″W
Cayuga	Cayuga East Aerodrome	PR		Jeff King	620 ft (190 m)		CAF2			42°57′37″N 79°47′18″W
Centralia	Centralia (Essery Field) Aerodrome	PR		Rob Essery	885 ft (270 m)		CES5			43°17′32″N 81°27′56″W
Centralia	Centralia/James T. Field Memorial Aerodrome (RCAF Station Centralia)	PU	CANPASS	New United Goderich	824 ft (251 m)	CYCE		YCE		43°17′08″N 81°30′30″W
CFB Borden	Borden Heliport (CFB Borden)	MI		DND	729 ft (222 m)	CYBN		YBN		44°16′18″N 79°54′45″W
Chapleau	Chapleau Airport	PU		Township of Chapleau	1,470 ft (450 m)	CYLD		YLD		47°49′12″N 83°20′48″W
Chatham-Kent	Chatham-Kent Airport	PU	CANPASS	Municipality of Chatham–Kent	645 ft (197 m)	CYCK		XCM		42°18′23″N 82°04′55″W
Chatham-Kent	Chatham-Kent Health Alliance (Chatham) Heliport	PR		Chatham-Kent Health Alliance	593 ft (181 m)		CPG8			42°24′13″N 82°11′36″W
Churchill	Churchill/Truway Field Aerodrome	PR		Ken Simpson	837 ft (255 m)		CKS3			44°13′47″N 79°34′07″W
Cobden	Cobden/Bruce McPhail Memorial Airport	PR		Champlain Flying Club	500 ft (150 m)		CPF4			45°35′42″N 76°50′00″W
Cobourg	Cobourg (Northumberland Hills Hospital) Heliport	PR		Northumberland Hills Hospital	343 ft (105 m)		CNB4			43°58′38″N 78°12′00″W
Cochrane	Cochrane Aerodrome	PU		Town of Cochrane	862 ft (263 m)	CYCN		YCN		49°06′20″N 81°00′49″W
Cochrane	Cochrane Water Aerodrome	PU		Cochrane Air Services	807 ft (246 m)		CNN5			49°06′35″N 81°02′00″W
Collingwood	Collingwood Airport	PU	15	Collingwood Regional Airport	730 ft (220 m)		CNY3			44°26′57″N 80°09′30″W
Collingwood	Collingwood/Alta Heliport	PR		Four Seasons Aviation; David Tommasini	725 ft (221 m)		CWD2			44°31′46″N 80°21′15″W
Collingwood	Collingwood (Blue Mountain) Heliport	PR		Craigleith Meadows	735 ft (224 m)		CBM4			44°31′47″N 80°21′17″W
Collingwood	Collingwood (General and Marine Hospital) Heliport	PR		Collingwood General and Marine Hospital	600 ft (180 m)		CPP2			44°29′59″N 80°12′12″W
Collingwood	Collingwood/Mountain Road Heliport	PR		Big Blue Air	735 ft (224 m)		CMR4			44°29′42″N 80°17′33″W
Collingwood	Collingwood (Wilsons) Heliport	PR		Richard Wilson	592 ft (180 m)		CCW2			44°30′35″N 80°13′46″W
Combermere	Combermere/Bonnie Brae Airfield	PR		Mary Ann McCrea	1,545 ft (471 m)		CMB8			45°22′27″N 77°43′23″W
Conestogo	Conestogo/Largo Woods Field Aerodrome	PR		David Woods	1,130 ft (340 m)		CLW6			43°34′00″N 80°28′15″W
Confederation Lake	Confederation Lake Water Aerodrome	PU		KaBeelo Airways	1,323 ft (403 m)		CJL7			51°03′00″N 92°50′00″W
Conn	Conn Aerodrome	PR		Toronto Soaring Club	1,658 ft (505 m)		CCN4			44°01′57″N 80°29′08″W
Constance Lake	Constance Lake Water Aerodrome	PR		C. & S. Haddad	196 ft (60 m)		CNQ5			45°24′10″N 75°58′32″W
Cookstown	Cookstown Airport	PR		Skydive Toronto	750 ft (230 m)		CCT2			44°14′20″N 79°38′20″W
Cookstown	Cookstown/Kirby Field Aerodrome	PR		G. Kirby	704 ft (215 m)		CKF8			44°07′58″N 79°43′30″W
Cookstown	Cookstown/Platinum Park Aerodrome	PR		Adam Wachtel	985 ft (300 m)		CRJ2			44°11′47″N 79°45′47″W
Cookstown	Cookstown/Tally-Ho Field Aerodrome	PR		Greatside Homes	850 ft (260 m)		CTH8			44°12′52″N 79°46′36″W
Cooper's Falls	Cooper Falls Aerodrome	PR		David Gallagher	780 ft (240 m)		COP5			44°46′41″N 79°14′54″W
Cordova Mines (Belmont Lake)	Cordova Mines/Belmont Lake Water Aerodrome	PR		Glen Jager	613 ft (187 m)		CBE4			44°30′25″N 77°49′22″W
Cornwall	Cornwall (Community Hospital McConnell Site) Heliport	PR		Cornwall Community Hospital McConnell Site	230 ft (70 m)		CPS6			45°01′52″N 74°43′04″W
Cornwall	Cornwall (DEV Centre) Heliport	PR		DEV Centre – DEV Hotel and Conference Centre	185 ft (56 m)		CNC2			45°01′39″N 74°40′47″W
Cornwall	Cornwall Regional Airport	PU	15	Cornwall Regional Airport Commission	175 ft (53 m)	CYCC		YCC		45°05′34″N 74°34′04″W
Cottam	Cottam Airport	PR		R. I. Bell	635 ft (194 m)		CRB2			42°08′24″N 82°39′10″W
Coulson	Coulson/Norwood Dale Field Aerodrome	PR		Ashlynne Dale	1,205 ft (367 m)		CAD9			44°31′36″N 73°37′54″W
Creemore	Creemore Aerodrome	PR		Alexander Younger	1,355 ft (413 m)		CCR9			44°20′48″N 80°08′03″W
Deep River	Deep River/Rolph Airport	PU		Gary McAnulty	490 ft (150 m)		CPH2			46°07′00″N 77°32′00″W
Deer Lake First Nation	Deer Lake Airport	PU		Government of Ontario	1,092 ft (333 m)	CYVZ		YVZ		52°39′21″N 94°03′41″W
De Lesseps Lake	De Lesseps Lake Airport	PR		Guardian Eagle Resort	1,312 ft (400 m)		CKF9			50°43′03″N 90°41′01″W
Delhi	Delhi Aerodrome	PR		Peter Vanberio	800 ft (240 m)		CDH6			42°53′05″N 80°24′22″W
Detour Lake Mine	Detour Lake Aerodrome	PR		Agnico Eagle Mines Limited	953 ft (290 m)		CDT9			50°02′38″N 79°44′46″W
Dorset	Dorset/Averell's Cove Water Aerodrome	PR		Hans Veit	1,165 ft (355 m)		CAC5			45°18′29″N 78°45′14″W
Dorset	Dorset/Kawagama Lake (South) Water Aerodrome	PR		Mike Wiebe	1,165 ft (355 m)		CDK3			45°15′50″N 78°47′32″W
Dorset	Nora Lake/Comak Landing Water Landing	PR		Brian Bissell	1,095 ft (334 m)		CNL7			45°09′13″N 78°50′02″W
Dryden	Dryden Best Western Heliport	PR		Best Western Motor Inn	1,200 ft (370 m)		CKV3			49°47′00″N 92°50′00″W
Dryden	Dryden Regional Airport	PU		City of Dryden / The Loomex Group	1,364 ft (416 m)	CYHD		YHD		49°49′53″N 92°44′37″W
Dryden	Dryden Water Aerodrome	PU		Dryden Flying Club	1,210 ft (370 m)		CJD8			49°46′00″N 92°50′00″W
Dundalk	Dundalk (Tripp Field) Aerodrome	PR		Robin Tripp	1,700 ft (520 m)		CTF4			44°10′23″N 80°18′37″W
Dundas	Dundas Heliport	PR		Robert D. Sheppard	680 ft (210 m)		CDU2			43°14′44″N 80°01′06″W
Dungannon	Dungannon Aerodrome	PU		Mari Vanderveeken	870 ft (270 m)		CDG3			43°50′11″N 81°36′24″W
Dunnville	Dunnville (Haldimand War Memorial Hospital) Heliport	PR		Haldimand War Memorial Hospital	586 ft (179 m)		CPA9			42°54′49″N 79°37′43″W
Dunrobin	Dunrobin/Django Field Aerodrome	PR		Leslie Nagy	334 ft (102 m)		CDJ8			45°24′39″N 75°56′13″W
Dunrobin	Dunrobin/Parti Field Aerodrome	PR		Varun Parti	230 ft (70 m)		CPF3			45°25′37″N 76°04′04″W
Dunsford	Dunsford Aerodrome	PR		Glen Snarr	900 ft (270 m)		CDU5			44°27′17″N 78°37′49″W
Dunsford	Dunsford Heliport	PR		Cecil Shaw	854 ft (260 m)		CDU8			44°30′07″N 78°37′04″W
Dunsford	Dunsford Seaplane Base Water Aerodrome	PR		Cecil Shaw	812 ft (247 m)		CDS5			44°30′07″N 78°37′05″W
Durham	Durham (Memorial Hospital) Heliport	PR		Durham Memorial Hospital	1,125 ft (343 m)		CPD3			44°10′45″N 80°49′46″W
Dwight	Dwight Aerodrome	PU		Lori Boothby	1,100 ft (340 m)		CNF8			45°18′48″N 78°58′30″W
Dwight	Dwight (Fox Point) Water Aerodrome	PU		Dr. Gary Magee	1,100 ft (340 m)		CFP2			45°16′26″N 79°00′43″W
Dwight	Dwight/Limberlost Forest Water Aerodrome	PR		G. Cockwell	1,230 ft (370 m)		CLL4			45°23′50″N 79°22′24″W
Dwight	Dwight/South Portage Water Aerodrome	PU		Bryan Hope	1,035 ft (315 m)		CLB3			45°19′03″N 79°04′04″W
Eabametoong First Nation	Fort Hope Airport	PU		Government of Ontario	899 ft (274 m)	CYFH		YFH		51°33′43″N 87°54′28″W
Ear Falls	Ear Falls Aerodrome	PR		3 Points in Space Media	1,269 ft (387 m)		CDP2			50°43′04″N 93°23′01″W
Ear Falls	Ear Falls Water Aerodrome	PU		Kay Air Service	1,171 ft (357 m)		CJE8			50°35′00″N 93°10′00″W
Earlton	Earlton/McLean Heliport	PR		McLean's Farm	900 ft (270 m)		CCM2			47°39′12″N 79°55′34″W
Earlton	Earlton (Timiskaming Regional) Airport	PU		Earlton-Timiskaming Regional Airport Authority	800 ft (240 m)	CYXR		YXR		47°41′42″N 79°50′56″W
East Linton	East Linton (Kerr Field) Aerodrome	PU		Rick Kerr	757 ft (231 m)		CEL3			44°39′40″N 80°56′39″W
Edenvale	Edenvale Airport	PU		Edenvale A/D	718 ft (219 m)		CNV8			44°26′28″N 79°57′46″W
Elk Lake	Elk Lake Water Aerodrome	PR		Karl Wettlaufer	925 ft (282 m)		CNV5			47°43′38″N 80°19′23″W
Elliot Lake	Elliot Lake Municipal Airport	PU		City of Elliot Lake	1,086 ft (331 m)	CYEL		YEL		46°21′05″N 82°33′41″W
Elliot Lake	Elliot Lake Water Aerodrome	PR		Glassy Bay Outfitters	990 ft (300 m)		CGB5			46°23′54″N 82°40′17″W
Elmira	Elmira Airport	PR		N. Kennedy	1,250 ft (380 m)		CNT6			43°35′05″N 80°36′11″W
Elora	Elora Aerodrome	PR		John Donkers	1,240 ft (380 m)		CDF5			43°37′57″N 80°21′23″W
Embrun	Ottawa/Embrun Aerodrome	PU		Embrun Airpark Inc. Serge Boucher	230 ft (70 m)		CPR2			45°14′28″N 75°17′55″W
Emsdale	Emsdale Airport	PU		Emsdale Airport Authority	1,150 ft (350 m)		CNA4			45°33′00″N 79°21′00″W
Englehart	Englehart (Dave's Field) Aerodrome	PR		David Laframboise	700 ft (210 m)		CDF3			47°48′35″N 79°48′40″W
Englehart	Englehart (District Hospital) Heliport	PR		Englehart and District Hospital	679 ft (207 m)		CNS3			47°49′23″N 79°52′49″W
Essex	Essex Airport	PU		P. & A. Harrington	620 ft (190 m)		CNE9			42°05′45″N 82°52′46″W
Essex	Essex/Billing Airstrip	PU		Pam/Erik Billing	630 ft (190 m)		CEB8			42°11′12″N 82°46′56″W
Ethel	Ethel Airport	PR		D.J. Martin	1,170 ft (360 m)		CPD2			43°44′41″N 81°10′38″W
Exeter	Sexsmith/Exeter Airport	PR		Sexsmith Pilots	856 ft (261 m)		CSX7			43°22′38″N 81°30′15″W
Fergus	Fergus (Groves Memorial Community Hospital) Heliport	PR		Groves Memorial Community Hospital	1,366 ft (416 m)		CPB2			43°41′51″N 80°23′42″W
Fergus	Fergus (Holyoake Airfield) Aerodrome	PR		Wilf Holyoake	1,380 ft (420 m)		CPY9			43°43′43″N 80°16′59″W
Fergus	Fergus (Juergensen Field) Airport	PU		Carl Jurgensen; Hans Jurgensen	1,450 ft (440 m)		CPG7			43°44′06″N 80°26′50″W
Fergus	Fergus (Vodarek Field) Aerodrome	PR		Tom Vodarek	1,380 ft (420 m)		CVF2			43°43′23″N 80°17′21″W
Flamborough	Flamboro Centre Aerodrome	PU		Andy Cetinski	813 ft (248 m)		CFC8			43°22′17″N 79°55′55″W
Flesherton	Flesherton (Smithorrs Field) Aerodrome	PR		Robert Smith	1,462 ft (446 m)		CFL4			44°15′54″N 80°31′40″W
Foot's Bay	Foot's Bay Water Aerodrome	PR		Philip Sifft	742 ft (226 m)		CFB8			45°07′46″N 79°42′35″W
Fordwich	Fordwich Airport	PR		H. Douglas; L. Zurbrigg	1,250 ft (380 m)		CPH9			43°53′17″N 80°59′43″W
Fort Albany First Nation	Fort Albany Airport	PU		Government of Ontario	47 ft (14 m)	CYFA		YFA		52°12′05″N 81°41′49″W
Fort Erie	Fort Erie (Airbus Helicopters Canada Ltd) Heliport	PR		Airbus Helicopters Canada Ltd	625 ft (191 m)		CPG3			42°55′16″N 78°57′21″W
Fort Frances	Fort Frances Municipal Airport	PU	15	Town of Fort Frances	1,123 ft (342 m)	CYAG		YAG		48°39′15″N 93°26′23″W
Fort Frances	Fort Frances Water Aerodrome	PU	15/SEA	Rusty Myers Flying Service	1,107 ft (337 m)		CJM8			48°37′40″N 93°21′28″W
Fort Severn First Nation	Fort Severn Airport	PU		Government of Ontario - MTO	51 ft (16 m)	CYER		YER		56°01′08″N 87°40′34″W
Fullarton	Fullerton/Monro Aerodrome	PR		Norman Paterson	1,140 ft (350 m)		CMR3			43°25′05″N 81°14′18″W
Gananoque	Gananoque Airport	PU	15	Thousand Island Recreational Aviation Centre	395 ft (120 m)		CNN8			44°24′07″N 76°14′39″W
Gananoque	Ganonoque Heliport	PR		Kouri's Helicopters	297 ft (91 m)		CGN4			44°20′49″N 76°10′28″W
Gananoque	Ganonoque/Signature Stables Heliport	PR		Luc Pilon	265 ft (81 m)		CGS3			44°18′50″N 76°13′50″W
Georgetown	Georgetown (Georgetown & District Hospital) Heliport	PR		Georgetown & District Hospital	878 ft (268 m)		CNZ6			43°38′40″N 79°56′04″W
Geraldton	Geraldton (District Hospital) Heliport	PR		Geraldton District Hospital	1,101 ft (336 m)		CPJ4			49°43′26″N 86°57′25″W
Geraldton	Geraldton (Greenstone Regional) Airport	PU		Town of Greenstone	1,143 ft (348 m)	CYGQ		YGQ		49°46′42″N 86°56′22″W
Gilford	Gilford Aerodrome	PR		Graham Kirby	738 ft (225 m)		CGF6			44°13′10″N 79°32′20″W
Goderich	Goderich Airport	PU	15, 15/SEA	Municipality of Goderich	709 ft (216 m)	CYGD		YGD		43°46′01″N 81°42′38″W
Gogama	Brebeuf Lake/The Beuf Water Aerodrome	PR		Keith Francis; Graham Nierop	1,362 ft (415 m)		CBR4			47°17′44″N 81°38′41″W
Gooderham	Gooderham/Pencil Lake Water Aerodrome	PR		Phoenix Lease-All	1,060 ft (320 m)		CNN7			44°48′00″N 78°21′00″W
Gore Bay	Gore Bay-Manitoulin Airport	PU	15, 15/SEA	Gore Bay-Manitoulin Airport Commission	623 ft (190 m)	CYZE		YZE		45°52′54″N 82°34′02″W
Grand Bend	Grand Bend Airport (RCAF Detachment Grand Bend)	PR		Grand Bend Sport Parachuting	642 ft (196 m)		CPL4			43°17′13″N 81°42′51″W
Grand Valley	Grand Valley (Black Field) Aerodrome	PU		John and Marlene Black	1,580 ft (480 m)		CGV5			43°51′36″N 80°17′19″W
Grand Valley	Grand Valley/Luther Field Aerodrome	PR		Jon & Kay Welch	1,602 ft (488 m)		CGV2			43°58′34″N 80°23′16″W
Grand Valley	Grand Valley (Martin Field) Aerodrome	PR		Don Martin	1,550 ft (470 m)		CGV6			43°52′29″N 80°17′12″W
Grand Valley	Grand Valley North Aerodrome	PU		Stan & Sheila Vander Ploeg	1,575 ft (480 m)		CGV3			43°57′45″N 80°21′15″W
Gravenhurst	Gravenhurst/Muskoka Bay Water Aerodrome	PR		Mark Nye	739 ft (225 m)	CYN6				44°56′36″N 79°24′18″W
Gravenhurst	Gravenhurst (Pr Muskoka) Water Aerodrome	PR		1000363870 Ontario Inc.	739 ft (225 m)		CGV4			44°57′22″N 79°24′43″W
Gravenhurst	Gravenhurst/Sniders Bay Water Aerodrome	PR		Andrew McNamara	739 ft (225 m)		CMC8			44°56′30″N 79°27′13″W
Gravenhurst	Gravenhurst (Downtown) Water Aerodrome	PR		Chris Thain	748 ft (228 m)		CGR6			44°53′23″N 79°23′03″W
Gravenhurst	Gravenhurst (Morrison Lake) Water Aerodrome	PR		Steven Shapiro	733 ft (223 m)		CML4			44°52′15″N 79°27′38″W
Gravenhurst (Lake Muskoka)	Lake Muskoka/Aultdowie Island Water Aerodrome	PR		Logan Hunt	739 ft (225 m)		CMA9			44°58′21″N 79°23′16″W
Gravenhurst (Lake Muskoka)	Lake Muskoka/Rankin Island Water Aerodrome	PR		Gary Bot	739 ft (225 m)		CRW3			44°58′30″N 79°26′30″W
Gravenhurst (Lake Muskoka)	Lake Muskoka South Water Aerodrome	PU		Ken Chapple/Steve Hamer	739 ft (225 m)		CHM5			44°57′59″N 79°25′48″W
Greenbank	Greenbank Airport	PU		Greenbank Airways	975 ft (297 m)		CNP8			44°08′01″N 79°00′46″W
Grimsby	Grimsby Regional Airport	PR	CANPASS	2222868 Ontario Inc	631 ft (192 m)		CNZ8			43°09′36″N 79°35′57″W
Guelph	Guelph Airpark	PU	15	Inglis Berry	1,100 ft (340 m)		CNC4			43°33′49″N 80°11′45″W
Hagersville	Hagersville (West Haldimand General Hospital) Heliport	PR		Hagersville West Haldimand General Hospital	729 ft (222 m)		CPA6			42°57′30″N 80°02′36″W
Haliburton	Haliburton/Stanhope Municipal Airport	PU		Township of Algonquin Highlands	1,066 ft (325 m)		CND4			45°06′39″N 78°38′24″W
Haliburton	Haliburton (Hospital) Heliport	PR		Haliburton Hospital	1,050 ft (320 m)		CNF2			45°02′17″N 78°31′49″W
Hamilton	John C. Munro Hamilton International Airport (Hamilton/John C. Munro International Airport)	PU	220 (400)	Airport Operations Controller / TradePort International Corporation	780 ft (240 m)	CYHM		YHM		43°10′25″N 79°56′06″W
Hamilton	Hamilton (General Hospital) Heliport	PR		Hamilton General Hospital	403 ft (123 m)		CPK3			43°15′43″N 79°51′17″W
Hamilton	Hamilton (McMaster University Medical Centre) Heliport	PR		Hamilton Health Sciences	265 ft (81 m)		CPJ3			43°16′00″N 79°56′00″W
Hanover	Hanover (District Hospital) Heliport	PR		Hanover District Hospital	935 ft (285 m)		CNZ7			44°08′27″N 81°01′45″W
Hanover	Saugeen Municipal Airport (Hanover/Saugeen Municipal Airport)	PU	15	Town of Hanover	940 ft (290 m)	CYHS				44°09′30″N 81°03′46″W
Harrow	Harrow Airport	PR		Louis & Thérèse Levesque	610 ft (190 m)		CGL2			42°03′34″N 82°50′27″W
Hastings	Hastings/Sweetwater Farms Aerodrome	PU		Bobby Henzie	780 ft (240 m)		CSW6			44°20′46″N 77°55′40″W
Hawkesbury	Hawkesbury Airport	PR		Club de vol à voile de Montréal - Montreal Soaring Club	167 ft (51 m)		CNV4			45°37′00″N 74°39′00″W
Hawkesbury	Hawkesbury (East) Airport	PU		East Hawkesbury Airport	200 ft (61 m)		CPG5			45°34′58″N 74°32′56″W
Hawk Junction	Hawk Junction Water Aerodrome	PR		Air-Dale Flying Service	1,030 ft (310 m)		CNH6			48°05′00″N 84°33′00″W
Head Lake	Head Lake Water Aerodrome	PU		Green Tourism Investments	880 ft (270 m)		CPV5			44°43′17″N 78°54′39″W
Hearst	Hearst/Carey Lake Water Aerodrome	PR		Hearst Air Service	812 ft (247 m)		CNJ5			49°45′00″N 84°02′00″W
Hearst	Hearst (René Fontaine) Municipal Airport	PU		Corporation of the Town of Hearst	826 ft (252 m)	CYHF		YHF		49°42′50″N 83°41′13″W
Heathcote	Heathcote/Wilkinson Field Aerodrome	PR		National Heritage Brands	807 ft (246 m)		CWF4			44°30′38″N 80°28′29″W
Henderson (Big Gull Lake)	Henderson/Big Gull Lake Water Aerodrome	PR		Jihn Atkins	880 ft (270 m)		CBG6			44°49′11″N 76°55′44″W
Highgate	Highgate Airport	PR		P. Spence	710 ft (220 m)		CNA2			42°33′16″N 81°48′11″W
Holland Landing	Holland Landing Airpark	PR		Holland Landing Airpark	855 ft (261 m)		CLA4			44°05′22″N 79°29′42″W
Hornepayne	Granitehill Lake Water Aerodrome	PR		Granite Air	1,200 ft (370 m)		CND6			49°06′00″N 85°12′00″W
Hornepayne	Hornepayne Municipal Airport	PU		Township of Hornepayne	1,101 ft (336 m)	CYHN		YHN		49°11′35″N 84°45′32″W
Hornepayne	Hornepayne Water Aerodrome	PR		Forde Lake Air Services	1,100 ft (340 m)		CNJ6			49°11′00″N 84°53′00″W
Hudson	Hudson Water Aerodrome	PU		Tudhope Airways	1,171 ft (357 m)		CJA9			50°06′00″N 92°10′00″W
Huntsville	Huntsville (Memorial District Hospital) Heliport	PR		Huntsville Memorial District Hospital	1,085 ft (331 m)		CPC9			45°20′25″N 79°12′23″W
Huntsville	Huntsville Water Aerodrome	PR		Keith Hay	931 ft (284 m)		CNU6			45°19′02″N 79°15′28″W
Huntsville	Huntsville/Bella Lake Water Aerodrome	PU		M.C. Tideman	1,168 ft (356 m)		CPY7			45°27′10″N 79°01′32″W
Huntsville	Huntsville/Grassmere S.D.W. Memorial Water Aerodrome	PU		Kevin & Lori Costello	932 ft (284 m)		CHN2			45°21′44″N 79°06′37″W
Huntsville	Huntsville (North) Water Aerodrome	PU		Donald C. Strano	931 ft (284 m)		CHL6			45°19′53″N 79°15′29″W
Ignace	Ignace (MBCHC) Heliport	PR		Mary Bergland Community Health Centre	1,500 ft (460 m)		CJN3			49°24′27″N 91°38′04″W
Ignace	Ignace Municipal Airport	PU		Township of Ignace	1,435 ft (437 m)	CZUC		ZUC		49°25′47″N 91°43′04″W
Ignace	Ignace Water Aerodrome	PU		Ignace Airways	1,486 ft (453 m)		CJD9			49°25′00″N 91°40′00″W
Innerkip	Innerkip Aerodrome	PR		Larry Ernewein	1,010 ft (310 m)		CNR2			43°13′57″N 80°41′41″W
Iona Station	Iona Station (Bobier Strip) Aerodrome	PR		Robert Bobier	755 ft (230 m)		COS2			42°40′35″N 81°27′04″W
Iroquois	Iroquois Airport	PR		Municipality of South Dundas	246 ft (75 m)		CNP7			44°50′31″N 75°18′44″W
Iroquois Falls	Iroquois Falls Airport	PU		Town of Iroquois Falls	1,002 ft (305 m)		CNE4			48°44′25″N 80°47′36″W
Kakabeka Falls	Kakabeka Falls Airport	PU		Kakabeka Falls Flying Club	1,000 ft (300 m)		CKG8			48°25′06″N 89°36′07″W
Kapuskasing	Kapuskasing Airport	PU		Corporation of the Town of Kapuskasing	743 ft (226 m)	CYYU		YYU		49°24′42″N 82°28′10″W
Kars	Kars/Rideau Valley Air Park (Rideau Valley Air Park)	PR		Chris Williams	286 ft (87 m)		CPL3			45°06′00″N 75°38′00″W
Kasabonika Lake First Nation	Kasabonika Airport	PU		Government of Ontario	673 ft (205 m)	CYAQ		XKS		53°31′29″N 88°38′35″W
Kashabowie	Kashabowie Outposts (Eva Lake) Water Aerodrome	PU		Sapawe Air	1,424 ft (434 m)		CKO2			48°43′10″N 91°12′10″W
Kashabowie	Kashabowie/Upper Shebandowan Lake Water Aerodrome	PU		Shebandowan Camps	1,474 ft (449 m)		CKF5			48°39′00″N 90°24′00″W
Kashechewan First Nation	Kashechewan Airport	PU		Government of Ontario	35 ft (11 m)	CZKE		ZKE		52°16′57″N 81°40′40″W
Keene	Keene/Elmhirst's Resort Airport	PR		Elmhirst's Resort (Keene)	650 ft (200 m)		CPS2			44°15′07″N 78°06′23″W
Keene	Keene/Elmhirst's Resort Water Aerodrome	PU		Elmhirst's Resort, Keene	613 ft (187 m)		CNQ6			44°15′05″N 78°06′15″W
Keewaywin First Nation	Keewaywin Airport	PU		Government of Ontario	990 ft (300 m)		CPV8	KEW		52°59′28″N 92°50′11″W
Kenora	Kenora Airport	PU	15	Kenora Airport Authority	1,344 ft (410 m)	CYQK		YQK		49°47′18″N 94°21′47″W
Kenora	Kenora (Lake of The Woods District Hospital) Heliport	PR		Kenora Lake of The Woods District Hospital	1,100 ft (340 m)		CJG6			49°46′07″N 94°29′56″W
Kenora	Kenora Water Aerodrome	PU	15/SEA	River Air	1,060 ft (320 m)		CJM9			49°45′56″N 94°29′40″W
Kenora	Kenora (Peterson's Landing) Water Aerodrome	PR		Alf Moncrief	1,037 ft (316 m)		CPL7			49°50′33″N 94°27′28″W
Kenora District	Wiebenville Aerodrome	PR		Wasaya Airways	1,228 ft (374 m)		CXX2			52°13′01″N 90°27′47″W
Kilbride	Kilbride (Bot) Heliport	PR		Bot Engineering	895 ft (273 m)		CCB8			43°26′54″N 79°56′57″W
Killarney	Voyageur Channel Water Aerodrome	PR		Mark Auerman	570 ft (170 m)		CVC2			45°57′02″N 81°01′52″W
Killarney	Killarney Airport	PU		Municipality of Killarney	608 ft (185 m)		CPT2			45°58′39″N 81°29′41″W
Killarney	Killarney (Killarney Mountain Lodge) Water Aerodrome	PU		Killarney Mountain Lodge	570 ft (170 m)		CKY4			45°58′09″N 81°30′25″W
Kincardine	Kincardine Municipal Airport	PU	CANPASS	Municipality of Kincardine	772 ft (235 m)	CYKM		YKD		44°12′05″N 81°36′24″W
Kincardine	Kincardine/Shepherd's Landing Airport	PR		G. Shepherd	675 ft (206 m)		CKS9			44°07′03″N 81°41′54″W
Kincardine	Kincardine (South Bruce Grey Health Centre) Heliport	PR		Kincardine South Bruce Grey Health Centre	700 ft (210 m)		CPU2			44°11′15″N 81°37′28″W
King City	King City/Kingsbridge Heliport	PR		The Kingsbridge Centre	932 ft (284 m)		CKC3			43°55′01″N 79°33′22″W
Kingfisher First Nation	Kingfisher Lake Airport	PU		Government of Ontario - MTO	866 ft (264 m)		CNM5	KIF		53°00′45″N 89°51′19″W
Kingston	Kingston/Riverland Aerodrome	PR		Shane Pinder	367 ft (112 m)		CRL9			44°18′44″N 76°32′18″W
Kingston	Kingston Norman Rogers Airport	PU	30	City of Kingston	303 ft (92 m)	CYGK		YGK		44°13′35″N 76°35′04″W
Kingston	Kingston (General Hospital) Heliport	PR		General Hospital	261 ft (80 m)		CPJ7			44°13′20″N 76°29′34″W
Kirkfield	Dalrymple Lake/Powers Water Aerodrome	PR		Paul Powers	735 ft (224 m)		CDR2			44°41′04″N 79°06′23″W
Kirkfield	Kirkfield/Balsam Lake Aerodrome	PR		Brian Freymond	864 ft (263 m)		CKD8			44°32′24″N 78°58′19″W
Kirkfield (Balsam Lake)	Kirkfield/Balsam Lake (Dutto) Water Aerodrome	PR		Alex Dutto	853 ft (260 m)		CDA8			44°35′25″N 78°52′01″W
Kirkfield (Balsam Lake)	Kirkfield/Balsam Lake (Erlandson) Water Aerodrome	PR		Doug Erlandson	853 ft (260 m)		CBE6			44°34′12″N 78°53′31″W
Kirkfield (Balsam Lake)	Kirkfield/Balsam Lake (Grand Island) Water Aerodrome	PR		Alastair Hopkins	853 ft (260 m)		CBG4			44°34′41″N 78°48′51″W
Kirkfield (Balsam Lake)	Kirkfield/Balsam Lake Seaplane Base	PR		Brian Freymond	853 ft (260 m)		CKW7			44°32′38″N 78°53′36″W
Kirkfield	Kirkfield/Dimkovski Airpark	PR		Steve Dimkovski	860 ft (260 m)		CDM3			44°34′12″N 78°54′07″W
Kirkfield	Kirkfield (Palestine) Aerodrome	PR		Rick Simpson	890 ft (270 m)		CKP4			44°29′24″N 78°58′40″W
Kirkland Lake	Kirkland Lake Airport	PU		Town of Kirkland Lake	1,157 ft (353 m)	CYKX		YKX		48°12′37″N 79°58′53″W
Kitchenuhmaykoosib Inninuwug First Nation	Big Trout Lake Airport	PU		Government of Ontario	730 ft (220 m)	CYTL		YTL		53°49′04″N 89°53′49″W
Kleinburg	Kleinburg (Tavares Field) Aerodrome	PR		Daniel Tavares	745 ft (227 m)		CTV4			43°51′40″N 79°35′35″W
Lake Joseph	Lake Joseph/Burnt Island Heliport	PR		Coywolf Aviation	742 ft (226 m)		CSD8			45°13′06″N 79°44′51″W
Lake Joseph	Lake Joseph/Eagle Island Heliport	PR		Scott Dick/Tim Royes	830 ft (250 m)		CJE9			45°10′41″N 79°41′47″W
Lake Joseph	Lake Joseph/Scheinberg Heliport	PR		Coywolf Aviation	742 ft (226 m)		CSH7			45°09′43″N 79°41′54″W
Lancaster	Lancaster Airpark	PU		Lancaster Airpark	145 ft (44 m)		CLA6			45°12′00″N 74°21′45″W
Laurel / Whittington	Laurel/Whittington Aerodrome	PU		Paul Lamont	1,550 ft (470 m)		CLW3			43°58′45″N 80°10′38″W
Leamington	Leamington Airport	PU	CANPASS	Justin Coates	582 ft (177 m)		CLM2			42°01′29″N 82°31′30″W
Lindsay	Lindsay/Kawartha Lakes Municipal Airport	PU	CANPASS	City of Kawartha Lakes Municipal Airport	895 ft (273 m)		CNF4			44°21′53″N 78°47′02″W
Little Britain (Lake Scugog)	Lake Scugog/Ball Point (Smith) Water Aerodrome	PR		Dana Smith	816 ft (249 m)		CBP7			44°12′24″N 78°48′33″W
Little Current	Little Current (Manitoulin Health Centre) Heliport	PR		Manitoulin Health Centre	625 ft (191 m)		CNT4			45°58′41″N 81°55′35″W
London	London International Airport	PU	180 AOE/CARGO	Greater London International Airport Authority	912 ft (278 m)	CYXU		YXU		43°01′59″N 81°09′04″W
London	London/Watson Airfield	PR		John Watson	935 ft (285 m)		CLW4			43°06′21″N 81°14′22″W
London	London/Chapeskie Field Airport	PR		Dr. H.H. Chapeskie	930 ft (280 m)		CLC2			43°04′06″N 81°07′32″W
London	London (Pioneer Airpark) Aerodrome	PU		Karl Pfister	980 ft (300 m)		CPN8			43°05′53″N 81°14′04″W
London	London (University Hospital) Heliport	PR		London University Hospital	794 ft (242 m)		CPR4			43°00′47″N 81°16′28″W
London	London (Victoria Hospital) Heliport	PR		London Hospital Corporation	875 ft (267 m)		CPW2			42°57′33″N 81°13′32″W
Lucan Biddulph	Lucan Airport	PU		General Airspray	960 ft (290 m)		CPS4			43°09′48″N 81°24′45″W
Machin	Vermilion Bay Airport	PU		Municipality of Machin	1,284 ft (391 m)		CKQ7			49°52′47″N 93°26′11″W
MacTier	Little Whitefish Lake (Seguin) Water Aerodrome	PR		David Pritchard McDevitt	850 ft (260 m)		CLW5			45°16′26″N 79°47′24″W
MacTier	MacTier/Smith Bay Water Aerodrome	PR		David Hatherley	742 ft (226 m)		CMT4			45°12′40″N 79°47′19″W
Madawaska	Madawaska Lake (Freymond) Water Aerodrome	PR		Brian Freymond	1,390 ft (420 m)		CMW5			45°20′16″N 78°22′03″W
Manitouwadge	Manitouwadge Airport	PU		Township of Manitouwadge	1,199 ft (365 m)	CYMG		YMG		49°05′02″N 85°51′38″W
Manitouwadge	Manitouwadge (Santé/Health) Heliport	PR		Santé Manitouwadge Health	1,052 ft (321 m)		CPU4			49°07′41″N 85°49′30″W
Manitowaning	Manitowaning/Manitoulin East Municipal Airport	PU	15	Manitoulin East Municipal Airport Commission	870 ft (270 m)	CYEM		YEM		45°50′33″N 81°51′27″W
Manitowaning	Manitowaning Water Aerodrome	PU		Township of Assiginack	581 ft (177 m)		CPJ9			45°44′00″N 81°48′00″W
Mansfield	Mansfield Airport	PR		Christopher Kenalty	995 ft (303 m)		CPV4			44°09′00″N 80°01′11″W
Maple Lake	Maple Lake Water Aerodrome	PR		Matthew Saade	1,022 ft (312 m)		CMP3			45°06′10″N 78°39′04″W
Marathon	Marathon Aerodrome	PU		Corporation of the Town of Marathon	1,032 ft (315 m)	CYSP		YSP		48°45′19″N 86°20′40″W
Marathon	Marathon (Wilson Memorial Hospital) Heliport	PR		North of Superior Healthcare Group -Wilson Memorial General Hospital	750 ft (230 m)		CPX2			48°43′07″N 86°22′29″W
Markdale	Markdale (Centre Grey General Hospital) Heliport	PR		Centre Grey General Hospital	1,369 ft (417 m)		CPD9			44°18′54″N 80°39′19″W
Markham	Markham Airport (Toronto/Markham Airport)	PR		Markham Airport	807 ft (246 m)		CNU8			43°56′09″N 79°15′44″W
Marten Falls First Nation	Ogoki Post Airport	PU		Government of Ontario	594 ft (181 m)	CYKP		YOG		51°39′31″N 85°54′06″W
Matawatchan	Matawatchan Aerodrome	PR		Brian Doyle	990 ft (300 m)		CMW3			45°09′50″N 77°05′46″W
Mattawa	Mattawa Airport	PU		Chris Whalley; Mark Wilkins	600 ft (180 m)		CMA2			46°17′59″N 78°44′52″W
Mattawa	Mattawa (Hospital) Heliport	PR		Mattawa Hospital	566 ft (173 m)		CMA5			46°18′36″N 78°42′46″W
Mattawa	Mattawa Water Aerodrome	PR		G. Thomas	500 ft (150 m)		CPT7			46°18′41″N 78°43′22″W
Maxville	Maxville Aerodrome	PR		Allan MacEwen	320 ft (98 m)		CMX2			45°17′51″N 74°51′00″W
Maxville	Maxville (Bourdon Farm) Aerodrome	PR		Bourdon Feed and Grain	359 ft (109 m)		CMB7			45°15′10″N 74°48′25″W
McKellar	McKellar (Manitouwabing) Water Aerodrome	PR		Ran Moore	800 ft (240 m)		CMK2			45°30′10″N 79°54′45″W
Meaford	Meaford (Brightshores Health System) Heliport	PR		Brightshores Health System	672 ft (205 m)		CPA7			44°36′25″N 80°35′56″W
Meaford	Major-General Richard Rohmer Meaford International Airport (Meaford/Major-General Richard Rohmer Airport)	PU	15	Meaford Airport	1,008 ft (307 m)	CYOS		YOS		44°35′25″N 80°50′15″W
Melbourne	Melbourne Aerodrome	PR		B. Carruthers	735 ft (224 m)		CNM2			42°49′27″N 81°32′55″W
Midland	Midland/Huronia Airport	PU	CANPASS	Huronia Airport Commission	773 ft (236 m)	CYEE		YEE		44°41′05″N 79°55′46″W
Midland	Midland (Huronia District Hospital) Heliport	PR		Huronia District Hospital	775 ft (236 m)		CPW6			44°44′30″N 79°54′52″W
Milford Bay (Lake Muskoka)	Lake Muskoka/Milford Bay Water Aerodrome	PR		Arnold Coulson	739 ft (225 m)		CMB6			45°04′31″N 79°28′49″W
Millgrove	Millgrove/Dragon's Fire Heliport	PR		Bells Hill Airpark	876 ft (267 m)		CDF7			43°22′50″N 79°56′27″W
Milton	Milton (AFI) Heliport	PR		AFI Group International	687 ft (209 m)		CMH2			43°31′56″N 79°54′10″W
Milton	Milton (District Hospital) Heliport	PR		Halton Health Care	663 ft (202 m)		CPY2			43°29′46″N 79°52′11″W
Miminiska	Miminiska Airport	PR		Wilderness North Air	1,000 ft (300 m)		CPS5			51°36′16″N 88°34′56″W
Miminiska	Miminiska Water Aerodrome	PU		Wilderness North Air	1,000 ft (300 m)		CMA4			51°36′05″N 88°34′51″W
Minaki	Minaki Aerodrome	PR		River Air	1,095 ft (334 m)		CJA6			49°58′17″N 94°42′04″W
Minaki	Minaki/Pistol Lake Water Aerodrome	PU		River Air	1,037 ft (316 m)		CKP3			49°58′37″N 94°42′59″W
Mindemoya	Mindemoya (Hospital) Heliport	PR		Mindemoya Hospital	675 ft (206 m)		CNW4			45°44′20″N 82°10′00″W
Minden Hills	Minden (Hospital) Heliport	PR		Haliburton Highlands Health Services	905 ft (276 m)		CMI2			44°55′29″N 78°43′46″W
Minett' (Lake Joseph)	Minett (Cliff Island Farm) Water Aerodrome	PR		Geoffrey Hogarth	742 ft (226 m)		CMN2			45°11′04″N 79°42′15″W
Mono	Mono/Dunby Manor Heliport	PR		James D. Wilson	1,407 ft (429 m)		CDM4			44°00′20″N 80°03′25″W
Montreal River	Montreal River Harbour/Bluearth Bow Lake Windfarm Heliport	PR		BluEarth Asset Management	1,012 ft (308 m)		CBL5			47°14′33″N 84°32′33″W
Moose Factory	Moose Factory Heliport	PR		Moose Factory Hospital	40 ft (12 m)		CPN3			51°14′57″N 80°37′02″W
Moosonee	Moosonee Airport	PU		The Corporation of the Town of Moosonee	30 ft (9.1 m)	CYMO		YMO		51°17′28″N 80°36′28″W
Morrisburg	Morrisburg Airport	PU		St. Lawrence Parks Commission	254 ft (77 m)		CNS8			44°57′00″N 75°05′00″W
Mountain View	Trenton/Mountain View Airport (CFD Mountain View)	MI		DND	362 ft (110 m)		CPZ3			44°04′12″N 77°20′22″W
Mount Brydges	Mount Brydges/Warren Field Aerodrome	PU		Mark Matthys	813 ft (248 m)		CWF3			42°56′09″N 81°28′39″W
Mount Forest	Mount Forest (Louise Marshall Hospital) Heliport	PR		Mount Forest (Louise Marshall Hospital)	1,365 ft (416 m)		CPA2			43°58′27″N 80°44′15″W
Mount Hope	Mount Hope (Willow Valley) Heliport	PR		Willow Valley Golf Course	723 ft (220 m)		CMH8			43°09′53″N 79°53′50″W
Muskoka	Muskoka Airport	PU	15	District Municipality of Muskoka	918 ft (280 m)	CYQA		YQA		44°58′35″N 79°18′24″W
Muskrat Dam Lake First Nation	Muskrat Dam Airport	PU		Government of Ontario	911 ft (278 m)	CZMD		MSA		53°26′29″N 91°45′46″W
Musselwhite mine	Opapimiskan Lake Airport	PR		Musselwhite Mine	1,010 ft (310 m)		CKM8			52°36′31″N 90°22′37″W
Nairn	Nairn (Triple Nickel) Aerodrome	PU		M. Bale	796 ft (243 m)		CTN8			43°02′47″N 81°36′11″W
Nakina	Nakina Airport	PU		The Loomex Group	1,052 ft (321 m)	CYQN		YQN		50°10′58″N 86°41′47″W
Nakina	Nakina Water Aerodrome	PU		Leuenburger Air Services Ltd. Nakina Air Service	975 ft (297 m)		CNE7			50°13′00″N 86°42′00″W
Neskantaga First Nation	Lansdowne House Airport	PU		Government of Ontario	834 ft (254 m)	CYLH		YLH		52°11′44″N 87°56′03″W
Nestor Falls	Nestor Falls Airport	PU		Township of Sioux Narrows-Nestor Falls	1,195 ft (364 m)		CJA5			49°08′25″N 93°55′01″W
Nestor Falls	Nestor Falls Water Aerodrome	PU		Nestor Falls Fly-In Outposts - Daws Bay; Northwest Flying Inc	1,076 ft (328 m)		CKT3			49°07′00″N 93°55′00″W
Nestor Falls	Nestor Falls/Sabaskong Bay Water Aerodrome	PU		Tinker's Places	1,060 ft (320 m)		CKW3			49°08′00″N 93°56′00″W
Newburgh	Newburgh Aerodrome	PR		David Clapp	500 ft (150 m)		CNB6			44°21′18″N 76°51′15″W
New Liskeard	New Liskeard (Temiskaming Hospital) Heliport	PR		Temiskaming Hospital	895 ft (273 m)		CNV3			47°29′40″N 79°41′30″W
Newtonville	Newtonville/Steeves Field Aerodrome	PR		J & L LeGassie	502 ft (153 m)		CNT9			43°56′24″N 78°26′42″W
Niagara Falls	Niagara Falls Heliport	PR		Niagara Helicopters	589 ft (180 m)		CPQ3			43°07′09″N 79°04′31″W
Niagara Falls	Niagara Falls (Greater Niagara General Hospital) Heliport	PR		Niagara Health System	650 ft (200 m)		CNG8			43°06′21″N 79°05′31″W
Nibinamik First Nation	Summer Beaver Airport	PU		Government of Ontario	833 ft (254 m)		CJV7	SUR		52°42′31″N 88°32′31″W
Nipigon	Nipigon (District Memorial Hospital) Heliport	PR		Nipigon District Memorial Hospital	761 ft (232 m)		CKE9			49°00′57″N 88°16′39″W
Nixon	Nixon Airport	PR		Robert Bennett	780 ft (240 m)		CNX8			42°50′51″N 80°23′43″W
Nobel	Nobel/Sawdust Bay Water Aerodrome	PU		Jacob Stapleton	580 ft (180 m)		CNT2			45°24′07″N 80°07′33″W
Norland (Shadow Lake)	Norland/Shadow Lake (Penny) Water Aerodrome	PR		Stephen Penny	849 ft (259 m)		CNP9			44°44′14″N 78°47′18″W
Norland (Shadow Lake)	Norland/Shadow Lake (Trotter) Water Aerodrome	PR		Rick Trotter	849 ft (259 m)		CTR5			44°44′13″N 78°47′27″W
Norland	Norland/Trotter Aerodrome	PR		Rick Trotter	1,039 ft (317 m)		CNR5			44°43′42″N 78°45′02″W
North Bay	North Bay/Jack Garland Airport (North Bay Airport)	PU	15	North Bay Jack Garland Airport Corporation	1,215 ft (370 m)	CYYB		YYB		46°21′49″N 79°25′22″W
North Bay	North Bay (North Bay Regional Health Centre) Heliport	PR		North Bay Regional Health Centre	715 ft (218 m)		CNB3			46°20′05″N 79°29′45″W
North Bay	North Bay Water Aerodrome	PR		Arnstein Equipment Rentals	663 ft (202 m)		CNH7			46°19′52″N 79°24′05″W
North Caribou Lake First Nation	Round Lake (Weagamow Lake) Airport	PU		Government of Ontario - MOT	974 ft (297 m)	CZRJ		ZRJ		52°56′37″N 91°18′46″W
North Caribou Lake First Nation (Weagamow Lake)	Round Lake (Weagamow Lake) Water Aerodrome	PU		Weagamow Corporation	951 ft (290 m)		CKP6			52°56′54″N 91°20′57″W
North Spirit Lake First Nation	North Spirit Lake Airport	PU		Government of Ontario	1,082 ft (330 m)		CKQ3	YNO		52°29′24″N 92°58′16″W
Oakville	Oakville (Trafalgar Memorial Hospital) Heliport	PR		Halton Health Care	531 ft (162 m)		CTM9			43°26′56″N 79°45′49″W
Oakwood	Oakwood Aerodrome	PR		N Kelly	920 ft (280 m)		COK3			44°20′12″N 78°54′35″W
Omemee	Omemee Aerodrome	PR		Elliot SA	840 ft (260 m)		CME2			44°17′08″N 78°37′39″W
Opasquia Provincial Park	Big Hook Wilderness Camp Water Aerodrome	PU		Big Hook Wilderness Camp	860 ft (260 m)		CJS6			53°34′00″N 92°57′00″W
Orangeville	Orangeville/Castlewood Field Aerodrome	PR		1000721284 Ontario	1,550 ft (470 m)		CPV2			43°57′31″N 80°09′18″W
Orangeville	Orangeville (Headwaters Healthecare Centre) Heliport	PR		Headwaters Healthecare Centre Orangeville	1,520 ft (460 m)		CHW2			43°55′12″N 80°04′32″W
Orangeville	Orangeville/Laurel Aerodrome	PR		M. Nielsen	1,620 ft (490 m)		COL2			43°57′01″N 80°12′21″W
Orillia	Orillia Rama Regional Airport	PU	15	Orillia Rama Regional Airport	725 ft (221 m)		CNJ4			44°40′39″N 79°18′35″W
Orillia	Orillia/Lake St John (Orillia Rama Regional) Water Aerodrome	PU	15/SEA	Orillia Rama Regional Airport	718 ft (219 m)		CNV6			44°40′54″N 79°18′27″W
Orillia	Orillia/Matchedash Lake Water Aerodrome	PR		R. and M. Allan	738 ft (225 m)		CPU5			44°47′00″N 79°30′00″W
Orillia	Orillia (Ontario Provincial Police) Heliport	PR		Ontario Provincial Police Helicopter Operations	820 ft (250 m)		COP2			44°35′04″N 79°25′44″W
Orillia (Lake Couchiching)	Orillia/Port Lehmann Water Aerodrome	PR		Stewart Lehmann	719 ft (219 m)		CLM9			44°36′37″N 79°24′24″W
Orillia (Lake Couchiching)	Orilla/Pumpkin Bay Water Aerodrome	PR		Allan Traves	705 ft (215 m)		COP4			44°36′27″N 79°24′16″W
Orono	Orono/Hawkefield Aerodrome	PR		Hannu Halminen	620 ft (190 m)		CHF4			43°59′54″N 78°38′54″W
Orono	Orono Field Aerodrome	PR		Paul Koukidis	590 ft (180 m)		COR3			43°58′22″N 78°35′22″W
Orrville	Orrville/Martin Lake Water Aerodrome	PR		Mark Auerman	922 ft (281 m)		CMA7			45°22′00″N 79°49′57″W
Oshawa	Oshawa Executive Airport (Toronto/Oshawa Executive Airport)	PU	50	City of Oshawa	460 ft (140 m)	CYOO		YOO		43°55′22″N 78°53′42″W
Ottawa	Ottawa/Casselman (Shea Field) Aerodrome	PR		Todd Shea	216 ft (66 m)		CSF7			45°17′59″N 75°10′17″W
Ottawa	Ottawa (Children's Hospital) Heliport	PR		Children's Hospital of Eastern Ontario	272 ft (83 m)		CPK7			45°24′04″N 75°39′01″W
Ottawa	Ottawa (Civic Hospital) Heliport	PR		Ottawa Civic Hospital	265 ft (81 m)		CPP7			45°23′30″N 75°43′14″W
Ottawa	Ottawa/Dwyer Hill Heliport	MI		DND	325 ft (99 m)	CYDH				45°07′50″N 75°56′54″W
Ottawa	Ottawa Macdonald–Cartier International Airport (Macdonald-Cartier International Airport)	PU	AOE, AOE/CARGO	Ottawa Macdonald–Cartier International Airport Authority	377 ft (115 m)	CYOW		YOW		45°19′21″N 75°40′09″W
Ottawa	Ottawa/Rockcliffe Airport (Rockcliffe Airport)	PU	CANPASS	Rockcliffe Flying Club	184 ft (56 m)	CYRO		YRO		45°27′38″N 75°38′36″W
Ottawa	Ottawa/Rockcliffe Water Aerodrome	PR		Rockcliffe Flying Club	125 ft (38 m)		CTR7			45°27′47″N 75°38′41″W
Owen Sound	Owen Sound (Brightshores Health System) Heliport	PR		Brightshores Health System	794 ft (242 m)		CNK6			44°34′05″N 80°54′48″W
Owen Sound	Owen Sound (Cook Field) Aerodrome	PU		Jim Cook	1,040 ft (320 m)		CCK5			44°38′05″N 80°44′45″W
Palmerston	Palmerston (District Hospital) Heliport	PR		Palmerston & District Hospital	1,300 ft (400 m)		CPA3			43°50′18″N 80°50′31″W
Parkhill	Parkhill (Yellow Gold) Aerodrome	PR		Rick Willemse	642 ft (196 m)		CYG2			43°09′36″N 81°42′11″W
Parry Sound	Parry Sound Area Municipal Airport	PU	CANPASS	Airport Commission	831 ft (253 m)		CNK4	YPD		45°15′31″N 79°49′51″W
Parry Sound (Georgian Bay)	Parry Sound (B183 Island) Water Aerodrome	PR		Peter Kofman	583 ft (178 m)		CPS7			45°08′36″N 80°05′21″W
Parry Sound	Parry Sound/Deep Bay Water Aerodrome	PR		Volker Steininger	580 ft (180 m)		CPT8			45°23′55″N 80°10′55″W
Parry Sound (Georgian Bay)	Parry Sound/Frying Pan Island-Sans Souci Water Aerodrome	PU		Henry's Fish Restaurant	580 ft (180 m)		CPS9			45°10′24″N 80°08′15″W
Parry Sound (Georgian Bay)	Parry Sound Harbour Water Aerodrome	PU		Lake Country Airways	580 ft (180 m)		CPS1			45°20′21″N 80°02′05″W
Parry Sound (Georgian Bay)	Parry Sound/Huron Island Water Aerodrome	PU		N.J. Westway	580 ft (180 m)		CPS8			45°10′46″N 80°06′24″W
Parry Sound	Parry Sound Medical Heliport	PR		Parry Sound District EMS	717 ft (219 m)		CRS2			45°20′30″N 80°01′00″W
Parry Sound	Parry Sound (Portage Lake) Water Aerodrome	PR		Peter Kropf	639 ft (195 m)		CPS3			45°24′22″N 80°03′05″W
Parry Sound (Georgian Bay)	Parrry Sound/Revilo Island Water Aerodrome	PR		Morris Kansun	583 ft (178 m)		CRV7			45°14′39″N 80°12′09″W
Parry Sound	Parry Sound (Roberts Lake) Water Aerodrome	PR	CANPASS (SEA)	Airport Commission	812 ft (247 m)		CRL8			45°14′59″N 79°49′33″W
Parry Sound (Georgian Bay)	Parry Sound/St. Waleran Island Water Aerodrome	PR		Todd Knight	580 ft (180 m)		CPD6			45°14′57″N 80°12′15″W
Parry Sound	Parry Sound/Salmon Lake Water Aerodrome	PR		Garret Bannerman-Maxwell	690 ft (210 m)		CSJ9			45°15′32″N 79°58′11″W
Paudash (Paudash Lake)	Paudash Lake (Marina) Water Aerodrome	PU		Paudash Lake Marina	1,126 ft (343 m)		CPD5			44°57′33″N 78°02′14″W
Paudash (Paudash Lake)	Paudash Lake (Murray's Landing) Water Aerodrome	PU		John Murray-Audain	1,126 ft (343 m)		CWP4			44°58′09″N 78°02′53″W
Peawanuck	Peawanuck Airport	PU		Government of Ontario	173 ft (53 m)	CYPO		YPO		54°59′17″N 85°26′36″W
Pelee	Pelee Island Airport	PU	15	Township of Pelee	572 ft (174 m)	CYPT				41°46′42″N 82°40′41″W
Pembroke	Pembroke Airport	PU	AOE/M	Pembroke and Area Airport Commission	532 ft (162 m)	CYTA		YTA		45°51′52″N 77°15′06″W
Pembroke	Pembroke (Regional Hospital) Heliport	PR		Pembroke Regional Hospital	496 ft (151 m)		CNG5			45°48′55″N 77°06′28″W
Pendleton	Pendleton Airport	PU		Gatineau Gliding Club	260 ft (79 m)		CNF3			45°29′10″N 75°05′46″W
Perth	Perth (Great War Memorial Hospital) Heliport	PR		Great War Memorial Hospital	450 ft (140 m)		CNC9			44°54′25″N 76°15′13″W
Petawawa	Petawawa Heliport	MI		DND	427 ft (130 m)	CYWA		YWA		45°57′01″N 77°19′09″W
Peterborough	Peterborough Regional Airport	PU	15	City of Peterborough	628 ft (191 m)	CYPQ		YPQ		44°13′50″N 78°21′47″W
Peterborough	Peterborough (Regional Health Centre) Heliport	PR		Peterborough Regional Health Centre	738 ft (225 m)		CNU3			44°18′02″N 78°20′45″W
Petrolia	Petrolia/Butler Airfield	PR		Edward & Tyler Butler	650 ft (200 m)		CBA7			42°54′59″N 82°12′23″W
Pickle Lake	Pickle Lake Airport	PU		Government of Ontario - MTO	1,268 ft (386 m)	CYPL		YPL		51°26′47″N 90°12′49″W
Pickle Lake	Pickle Lake Water Aerodrome	PU		Gold Belt Air Transport Inc. Osnaburgh Airways Ltd.	1,180 ft (360 m)		CKG4			51°28′00″N 90°12′00″W
Picton	Picton (Greenbush) Aerodrome	PR		Jeff Douglass	460 ft (140 m)		CGB3			44°00′04″N 77°04′24″W
Pikangikum First Nation	Pikangikum Airport	PU		Government of Ontario - MTO	1,117 ft (340 m)	CYPM		YPM		51°49′11″N 93°58′24″W
Plattsville	Plattsville (Edward's Air Base) Aerodrome	PU		Edward Lubitz	980 ft (300 m)		CLB2			43°18′21″N 80°32′55″W
Plevna	Plevna/Tomvale Airport	PR		Tomvale Air Services	890 ft (270 m)		CNA9			44°54′58″N 76°56′09″W
Pointe au Baril	Pointe au Baril Station Water Aerodrome	PR		Jeremy and Ryan Edwards	580 ft (180 m)		CPB6			45°32′24″N 80°23′15″W
Poplar Hill First Nation	Poplar Hill Airport	PU		Government of Ontario - MTO	1,095 ft (334 m)		CPV7	YHP		52°06′48″N 94°15′20″W
Port Carling (Lake Muskoka)	Lake Muskoka/Mortimer's Point Water Aerodrome	PU		Dan Mortimer	739 ft (225 m)		CNC7			45°03′00″N 79°33′40″W
Port Carling (Lake Rosseau)	Lake Rosseau/Arthurlie Bay Water Aerodrome	PR		Gary Sohal	742 ft (226 m)		CPF9			45°06′38″N 79°33′01″W
Port Carling (Lake Joseph)	Port Carling/Lake Joseph Water Aerodrome	PR		Port Sandfield Marina	742 ft (226 m)		CLJ2			45°06′52″N 79°37′21″W
Port Carling (Lake Rosseau)	Lake Rosseau/Onnalinda Point Water Aerodrome	PR		Michael Koff	742 ft (226 m)		COP3			45°10′06″N 79°37′28″W
Port Carling	Port Carling Aerodrome	PR		Brent Quarries	850 ft (260 m)		CPC2			45°05′32″N 79°35′49″W
Port Carling	Port Carling (Avon Bay) Water Aerodrome	PR		Daniel Wittlin	742 ft (226 m)		CPC5			45°07′36″N 79°40′04″W
Port Carling	Port Carling/Butterfly Lake Water Aerodrome	PR		Trent McCabe	765 ft (233 m)		CPY8			45°05′38″N 79°37′50″W
Port Carling	Port Carling/Elarton Point Heliport	PR		Capital Infrastructure Group	743 ft (226 m)		CPE3			45°08′08″N 79°38′30″W
Port Carling	Port Carling/Fig Air Heliport	PR		Fig Air	748 ft (228 m)		CFA2			45°07′41″N 79°32′16″W
Port Carling	Port Carling/Horseshoe Island Heliport	PR		Horseshoe Island - Horseshoe Middle	755 ft (230 m)		CHS8			45°05′09″N 79°32′52″W
Port Carling	Port Carling/W Shores Heliport	PR		James D. Wilson	739 ft (225 m)		CPC8			45°03′47″N 79°34′48″W
Port Colborne	Port Colborne Airport	PR		Skydive Burnaby	600 ft (180 m)		CPE5			42°52′39″N 79°21′10″W
Port Elgin	Port Elgin Airport	PU	CANPASS	Town Airport Committee	650 ft (200 m)		CNL4			44°24′55″N 81°24′52″W
Port Hope	Port Hope (Millson Field) Aerodrome	PR		Wayne Millson	525 ft (160 m)		CMF4			43°59′20″N 78°25′42″W
Port Hope	Port Hope (Peter's Field) Aerodrome	PR		Spatial Concepts	560 ft (170 m)		CPH3			44°01′29″N 78°25′37″W
Port Loring (Portage Lake)	Portage Lake Water Aerodrome	PR		Tornado's Canadian Resorts	710 ft (220 m)		CND9			45°46′00″N 80°14′00″W
Port Loring	Port Loring Water Aerodrome	PU		Tornado's Canadian Resorts	668 ft (204 m)		CNQ7			45°53′00″N 80°06′00″W
Port Loring	Smoky Lake Water Aerodrome	PU		Tornado's Canadian Resorts	725 ft (221 m)		CNS2			45°51′00″N 80°13′00″W
Port Perry (Lake Scugog)	Lake Scugog/Island View Water Aerodrome	PR		Phil Sciuk	816 ft (249 m)		CSV6			44°07′45″N 78°56′31″W
Port Perry	Port Perry/Utica Field Aerodrome	PR		Arnold Kerry	920 ft (280 m)		CUT2			44°03′58″N 79°01′15″W
Port Perry	Port Perry/Hoskin Aerodrome	PR		Norm Hoskin	900 ft (270 m)		CPP3			44°03′42″N 78°53′07″W
Port Perry	Port Perry (Lakeridge Health) Heliport	PR		Lakeridge Health Port Perry	875 ft (267 m)		CPX6			44°06′19″N 78°57′17″W
Port Severn	Port Severn/Oak Bay Water Aerodrome	PU		Craig Marchetti; Robert Marchetti	580 ft (180 m)		COB2			44°47′44″N 79°44′13″W
Port Stanton	Port Stanton/Sparrow Lake Water Aerodrome	PR		John A. Stanton	698 ft (213 m)		CNX7			44°48′00″N 79°25′00″W
Rainy River	Rainy River Water Aerodrome	PU	15/SEA	Canada Border Services Agency	1,062 ft (324 m)		CKQ4			48°43′00″N 94°34′00″W
Red Lake	Red Lake Airport	PU		Municipality of Red Lake / Thunder Bay Airport Services Inc	1,266 ft (386 m)	CYRL		YRL		51°03′54″N 93°47′41″W
Red Lake	Red Lake (Margaret Cochenour Memorial Hospital) Heliport	PR		Margaret Cochenour Memorial Hospital	1,254 ft (382 m)		CRL3			51°00′49″N 93°49′19″W
Red Lake	Red Lake (Howey Bay) Water Aerodrome	PU		Superior Airways	1,165 ft (355 m)		CKS4			51°01′35″N 93°49′07″W
Rednersville	Rednersville/Aery Aerodrome	PR		Don Patrick	390 ft (120 m)		CRA3			44°06′19″N 77°27′34″W
Renfrew	Renfrew/Black Donald Lake Water Aerodrome	PU		White Pines Resort	815 ft (248 m)		CPK8			45°12′18″N 76°57′24″W
Renfrew	Renfrew/Hurds Lake Water Aerodrome	PR		Steve Arbuthnot	608 ft (185 m)		CNL6			45°24′15″N 76°38′54″W
Renfrew	Renfrew (Victoria Hospital) Heliport	PR		Renfrew Victoria Hospital	400 ft (120 m)		CPG9			45°28′57″N 76°41′46″W
Rockton	Rockton Airport	PR		SOSA Gliding Club	846 ft (258 m)		CPT3			43°19′20″N 80°10′35″W
Rockton	Rockton (Onward Aviation Private) Heliport	PR		Queen Victoria Air	836 ft (255 m)		CRO2			43°18′45″N 80°07′46″W
Rodney	Rodney/Pinder Airfield	PR		Rodney Pinder	700 ft (210 m)		CPN2			42°34′19″N 81°42′01″W
Roseneath	Roseneath/Lilac Lodge Water Aerodrome	PR		Craig Juby	613 ft (187 m)		CLL5			44°14′37″N 78°04′12″W
Rosseau (Lake Joseph)	Lake Joseph/Burnegie Bay Water Aerodrome	PR		Timothy Best	742 ft (226 m)		CLJ4			45°14′04″N 79°44′37″W
Rosseau	Rosseau Aerodrome	PR		Ron Brent	826 ft (252 m)		CRS4			45°16′09″N 79°39′21″W
Sachigo Lake First Nation	Sachigo Lake Airport	PU		Government of Ontario - MTO	876 ft (267 m)	CZPB		ZPB		53°53′28″N 92°11′47″W
St. Catharines	St. Catharines/Niagara District Airport	PU	15	Niagara District Airport Commission	322 ft (98 m)	CYSN		YCM		43°11′30″N 79°10′18″W
St. Catharines	St. Catharines (Niagara Health System) Heliport	PR		Niagara Health System	336 ft (102 m)		CNH4			43°09′06″N 79°16′50″W
Saintfield	Saintfield/Stone Aerodrome	PR		Robert Stone	1,010 ft (310 m)		CST4			44°11′28″N 79°00′54″W
St. Thomas	St. Thomas Municipal Airport	PU	15	Municipality of St. Thomas	779 ft (237 m)	CYQS		YQS		42°46′12″N 81°06′39″W
Sand Point Lake	Sand Point Lake Water Aerodrome	PU	15	Canada Border Services Agency	1,119 ft (341 m)		CJD6			48°20′00″N 92°27′00″W
Sandy Lake First Nation	Sandy Lake Airport	PU		Government of Ontario - MTO	951 ft (290 m)	CZSJ		ZSJ		53°03′51″N 93°20′40″W
Sandy Lake First Nation	Sandy Lake Water Aerodrome	PU		Sandy Lake Seaplane Services	901 ft (275 m)		CKE5			53°03′00″N 93°20′00″W
Sarnia	Sarnia (Bluewater Health) Heliport	PR		Bluewater Health	598 ft (182 m)		CBW5			42°58′31″N 82°23′17″W
Sarnia	Sarnia Chris Hadfield Airport	PU	30	City of Sarnia	595 ft (181 m)	CYZR		YZR		42°59′58″N 82°18′32″W
Sault Ste. Marie	Sault Ste. Marie Airport	PU	30	Sault Ste. Marie Airport Development Corporation	629 ft (192 m)	CYAM		YAM		46°29′07″N 84°30′34″W
Sault Ste. Marie	Sault Ste. Marie Heliport	PU		Canadian Bushplane Heritage Centre	580 ft (180 m)		CNR3			46°30′16″N 84°19′24″W
Sault Ste. Marie	Sault Ste. Marie (Sault Area Hospital) Heliport	PR		Sault Area Hospital	797 ft (243 m)		CSM9			46°32′51″N 84°18′45″W
Sault Ste. Marie	Sault Ste. Marie Water Aerodrome	PU	15/SEA	Canadian Bushplane Heritage Centre	580 ft (180 m)		CPX8			46°30′16″N 84°19′24″W
Sault Ste. Marie	Sault Ste. Marie/Partridge Point Water Aerodrome	PR		Mark Dick	580 ft (180 m)		CPP9			46°30′51″N 84°14′54″W
Savant Lake	Savant Lake (Sturgeon Lake) Water Aerodrome	PU		Rusty Myers Flying Service	1,342 ft (409 m)		CJP3			50°12′00″N 90°41′00″W
Schomberg	Schomberg/Amaroo Heliport	PR		D. Valela	1,125 ft (343 m)		CNA6			43°57′17″N 79°37′08″W
Schomberg	Schomberg (Sloan Field) Aerodrome	PR		Gord Sloan	890 ft (270 m)		CSV8			43°59′10″N 79°43′38″W
Scugog	Scugog/Charlies Landing Water Aerodrome	PU		Jim Martyn	816 ft (249 m)		CHS4			44°09′41″N 78°49′28″W
Seagrave	Seagrave/North Port Aerodrome	PR		North Port Aerodrome	870 ft (270 m)		CNP4			44°10′00″N 78°56′09″W
Seagrave	Seagrave/North Port Water Aerodrome	PR		North Port Aerodrome	816 ft (249 m)		CNP2			44°10′00″N 78°55′47″W
Selkirk	Selkirk Aerodrome	PU		Jamie Alexandre	620 ft (190 m)		CJA2			42°48′25″N 79°58′37″W
Severn Bridge	Severn Bridge Aerodrome	PR		Kevin Betsworth	755 ft (230 m)		CSB7			44°46′09″N 79°24′30″W
Severn Bridge	Severn Bridge/Buck Lake Water Aerodrome	PR		Kevin Betsworth	709 ft (216 m)		CBL2			44°46′18″N 79°24′47″W
Shelburne	Shelburne/Fisher Field Aerodrome	PU		578035 Ontario Ltd	1,675 ft (511 m)		CNN3			44°01′42″N 80°12′22″W
Shelburne	Shelburne (Schaefer Field) Aerodrome	PR		Rick Schaefer	1,620 ft (490 m)		CSF4			44°00′31″N 80°15′45″W
Simcoe	Simcoe (Dennison Field) Airport	PR		Jeff Dennison	722 ft (220 m)		CPA4			42°49′09″N 80°15′57″W
Simcoe	Simco (Norfolk General Hospital) Heliport	PR		Simco (Norfolk General Hospital)	716 ft (218 m)		CPA8			42°50′50″N 80°19′13″W
Sioux Lookout	Sioux Lookout Airport	PU		Municipality of Sioux Lookout	1,257 ft (383 m)	CYXL		YXL		50°06′49″N 91°54′20″W
Sioux Lookout	Sioux Lookout/Pelican Lake Water Aerodrome	PU		Slate Falls Airways; Bamaji Air	1,171 ft (357 m)		CKA6			50°05′31″N 91°54′45″W
Six Mile Lake	Six Mile Lake (Hungry Bay) Water Aerodrome	PR		Earle Robinson	622 ft (190 m)		CML6			44°54′59″N 79°43′16″W
Six Mile Lake	Six Mile Lake (South) Water Aerodrome	PU		Peter Stewart	622 ft (190 m)		CSM6			44°53′09″N 79°44′22″W
Skeleton Lake	Skeleton Lake Water Aerodrome	PU		Wilson's Lodge	920 ft (280 m)		CPQ7			45°13′55″N 79°26′10″W
Slate Falls First Nation	Slate Falls Airport	PU		Government of Ontario	1,355 ft (413 m)		CKD9			51°07′48″N 91°39′56″W
Smiths Falls	Smiths Falls (Community Hospital) Heliport	PR		Smiths Falls Community Hospital	409 ft (125 m)		CNS9			44°54′26″N 76°01′40″W
Smiths Falls	Smiths Falls-Montague Airport (Smiths Falls-Montague (Russ Beach) Airport)	PU	CANPASS	Smith Falls Flying Club	418 ft (127 m)	CYSH		YSH		44°56′45″N 75°56′26″W
Smithville	Smithville Aerodrome	PR		Smithville Flying Club	640 ft (200 m)		CLS6			43°06′04″N 79°37′49″W
Southampton	Southampton Aerodrome	PU		G. Wilson	685 ft (209 m)		CPF7			44°29′38″N 81°20′07″W
South River / Sundridge	Sundridge/South River Airpark	PU		Sundridge/South River Airpark	1,190 ft (360 m)		CPE6			45°49′21″N 79°19′25″W
Spanish	Spanish/Aird Island Water Aerodrome	PU		National Heritage Brands	577 ft (176 m)		CRD8			46°08′35″N 82°24′52″W
Springvale	Springvale Aerodrome	PU		Ralph Bennett	720 ft (220 m)		CGV7			42°58′12″N 80°09′34″W
Springwater	Springwater (Barrie Airpark) Aerodrome	PU		Harbour Management	953 ft (290 m)		CNA3			44°24′23″N 79°43′54″W
Staunton Lake	Staunton Lake Water Aerodrome	PU		Latto's Fishing Lodge	1,365 ft (416 m)		CKK8			50°22′59″N 90°39′31″W
Stayner	Stayner (Clearview Field) Aerodrome	PR		Clearview Nursery Ltd. Kevin Elwood	877 ft (267 m)		CLV2			44°24′16″N 80°08′53″W
Stirling-Rawdon	Stirling Aerodrome	PR		Oak Hills Flying Club	625 ft (191 m)		CPJ5			44°14′29″N 77°33′42″W
Stoney Creek	Stoney Creek Airport	PR		2866264 Ontario Inc.	680 ft (210 m)		CPF6			43°10′10″N 79°42′35″W
Stoney Point	Stoney Point (Le Cunff) Airport	PR		Armel Le Cunff	625 ft (191 m)		CRML			42°17′44″N 82°32′06″W
Stouffville	Stouffville Aerodrome	PR		Bill Bryan	975 ft (297 m)		CBB2			43°59′36″N 79°16′01″W
Straffordville	Straffordville/Bushhawk Creek Aerodrome	PR		Bushhawk Creek	715 ft (218 m)		CBH5			42°42′52″N 80°44′42″W
Stratford	Stratford Municipal Airport	PU	15	Corp. of the City of Stratford	1,211 ft (369 m)	CYSA				43°24′56″N 80°56′04″W
Strathroy-Caradoc	Strathroy (Blue Yonder) Airport	PU		J. Pollock	780 ft (240 m)		CPK2			42°57′57″N 81°35′30″W
Sturgeon Bay	Sturgeon Bay/Richards Beach Water Aerodrome	PU		Ron Simpson/Ryan Simpson	548 ft (167 m)		CRB6			44°44′16″N 79°44′50″W
Sturgeon Falls	Sturgeon Falls (West Nipissing General Hospital) Heliport	PR		West Nipissing General Hospital	680 ft (210 m)		CNM3			46°22′24″N 79°54′58″W
Sturgeon Lake	Fenelon Falls/Sturgeon Lake Water Aerodrome	PU		Derrick Janke	812 ft (247 m)		CFG8			44°31′26″N 78°43′49″W
Greater Sudbury	Sudbury Airport (Greater Sudbury Airport)	PU	15	Municipality of Sudbury	1,143 ft (348 m)	CYSB		YSB		46°37′30″N 80°47′56″W
Greater Sudbury	Sudbury/Azilda Water Aerodrome	PU		True North Airways	869 ft (265 m)		CNC5			46°32′00″N 81°08′00″W
Greater Sudbury	Sudbury/Coniston Airport	PU		Central North Flying Club	886 ft (270 m)		CSC9			46°28′56″N 80°50′02″W
Greater Sudbury	Sudbury/Kelly Lake Heliport	PU		Todd Thomas	833 ft (254 m)		CSU8			46°26′58″N 81°02′42″W
Greater Sudbury	Sudbury/Lively (Skyline Helicopter Technologies) Heliport	PR		Skyline Helicopter Technologies	860 ft (260 m)		CSK7			46°26′08″N 81°07′19″W
Greater Sudbury	Sudbury/Long Lake (Wavy) Water Aerodrome	PR		Fisher Wavy	751 ft (229 m)		CLL6			46°24′21″N 81°01′57″W
Greater Sudbury	Sudbury/Ramsey Lake Water Aerodrome	PR		David Chisholm	810 ft (250 m)		CNB8			46°29′12″N 80°57′32″W
Greater Sudbury	Sudbury (Health Sciences North) Hospital Heliport	PR		Health Sciences North Sudbury	985 ft (300 m)		CSL8			46°28′05″N 80°59′46″W
Sunderland	Sunderland Aerodrome	PR		Jeff Klimpel	950 ft (290 m)		CSD7			44°13′37″N 79°05′50″W
Teeswater	Teeswater (Dent Field) Aerodrome	PR		J. Dent	1,050 ft (320 m)		CDF2			43°59′40″N 81°17′37″W
Teeswater	Teeswater (Thompson Field) Airport	PU		D. Thompson	1,000 ft (300 m)		CPC6			43°56′54″N 81°16′19″W
Temagami	Temagami/Mine Landing Water Aerodrome	PR		CANUSA Vacations	962 ft (293 m)		CTM2			46°57′37″N 80°01′23″W
Temagami	Temagami Water Aerodrome	PU		Lakeland Airways	962 ft (293 m)		CNC8			47°03′45″N 79°47′36″W
Thornbury	Thornbury/Fossil Beach (Blue Mountain) Heliport	PR		MKCK Holdings	588 ft (179 m)		CFB9			44°32′20″N 80°22′33″W
Thunder Bay	Thunder Bay International Airport	PU	40	Thunder Bay International Airports Authority	654 ft (199 m)	CYQT		YQT		48°22′19″N 89°19′26″W
Thunder Bay	Thunder Bay/Two Island Lake Water Aerodrome	PU		Donald R. Plumridge	1,455 ft (443 m)		CTI2			48°41′15″N 89°21′36″W
Thunder Bay	Thunder Bay/Eldorado Aerodrome	PR		Brian Forsyth	700 ft (210 m)		CED8			48°34′20″N 88°49′00″W
Thunder Bay	Thunder Bay (Health Science Centre) Heliport	PR		Thunder Bay Regional Health Sciences Centre	715 ft (218 m)		CTB2			48°25′24″N 89°16′11″W
Thunder Bay	Thunder Bay (Martin's Landing) Aerodrome	PR		Richard A. Martin	1,114 ft (340 m)		CML5			48°17′37″N 89°32′36″W
Thunder Bay	Thunder Bay Water Aerodrome	PU	15/SEA	Harbour Commission; Lakehead Airways; Lakehead Aviation; Wilderness North Air	601 ft (183 m)		CKE6			48°27′00″N 89°10′00″W
Tillsonburg	Tillsonburg Airport	PU	CANPASS	Town of Tillsonburg	893 ft (272 m)	CYTB				42°55′35″N 80°44′49″W
Timmins	Timmins Victor M. Power Airport	PU		City of Timmins	968 ft (295 m)	CYTS		YTS		48°34′09″N 81°22′39″W
Timmins	Timmins (Timmins & District Hospital) Heliport	PR		Timmins and District Hospital	950 ft (290 m)		CTM6			48°29′13″N 81°18′49″W
Tobermory	Tobermory Airport	PU		Township of the North Bruce Peninsula	700 ft (210 m)		CNR4			45°13′18″N 81°37′43″W
Toronto	Billy Bishop Toronto City Airport (City Centre Airport, Toronto Island Airport)	PU	90	Toronto Port Authority / Nieuport Aviation	252 ft (77 m)	CYTZ		YTZ		43°37′39″N 79°23′46″W
Toronto	Billy Bishop Toronto City Water Aerodrome	PR	15/SEA	Toronto Ports Authority	246 ft (75 m)		CPZ9			43°37′59″N 79°23′40″W
Toronto	Toronto/Chartright Polson Pier Heliport	PR		Polson Parking Corporation	251 ft (77 m)		CPP4			43°38′30″N 79°21′22″W
Toronto	Toronto (Hospital For Sick Children) Heliport	PR		Hospital for Sick Children	497 ft (151 m)		CNW8			43°39′25″N 79°23′16″W
Toronto	Toronto Pearson International Airport	PU	AOE, AOE/CARGO	Greater Toronto Airports Authority	569 ft (173 m)	CYYZ		YYZ		43°40′34″N 79°37′50″W
Toronto	Toronto/Markham Stouffville Heliport	PR		Markham Stouffville Hospital	704 ft (215 m)		CPH7			43°52′58″N 79°13′58″W
Toronto	Toronto (Mississauga Credit Valley Hospital) Heliport	PR		Credit Valley Hospital	523 ft (159 m)		CPK6			43°33′41″N 79°42′10″W
Toronto	Toronto (St. Michael's Hospital) Heliport	PR		St. Michael's Hospital	528 ft (161 m)		CTM4			43°39′15″N 79°22′42″W
Toronto	Toronto (Sunnybrook Health Science Centre) Heliport	PR		Sunnybrook Health Sciences Centre	612 ft (187 m)		CNY8			43°43′17″N 79°22′37″W
Toronto	Toronto/Tarten Heliport	PR		Tarten Equipment	560 ft (170 m)		CPA5			43°39′14″N 79°39′28″W
Toronto	Toronto/Wilson's Heliport	PR		Wilson's Heli-Trans	370 ft (110 m)		CPY5			43°37′04″N 79°33′49″W
Torrance (Lake Muskoka)	Lake Muskoka (Miller Island) Water Aerodrome	PR		Joan Copp	739 ft (225 m)		CLM6			44°59′32″N 79°27′55″W
Torrance	Torrence/Walkers Point Aerodrome	PR		Ian Smith	793 ft (242 m)		CWP5			45°00′41″N 79°27′33″W
Tottenham	Tottenham/Mardon Aerodrome	PR		Marvin Chantler	820 ft (250 m)		CMA6			44°03′28″N 79°52′48″W
Tottenham	Tottenham/Ronan Aerodrome	PR		Mike & Cheryl Ronan	823 ft (251 m)		CTR3			44°02′32″N 79°50′47″W
Tottenham	Tottenham/Volk Airport	PU		Lisa Volk	1,020 ft (310 m)		CPM5			43°59′39″N 79°46′43″W
Trenton	CFB Trenton (Trenton Airport)	MI	AOE/M	DND	283 ft (86 m)	CYTR		YTR		44°07′09″N 77°31′42″W
Tyendinaga	Tyendinaga (Mohawk) Airport	PU		First Nations Technical Institute	260 ft (79 m)		CPU6			44°11′05″N 77°06′28″W
Ullswater	Ullswater Aerodrome	PR		Ron Brent	1,010 ft (310 m)		CLW2			45°12′39″N 79°30′16″W
Upsala	Upsala Heliport	PR		Ontario Ministry of Health	1,581 ft (482 m)		CKL8			49°03′01″N 90°28′09″W
Uxbridge	Uxbridge (Cottage Hospital) Heliport	PR		Uxbridge Cottage Hospital	900 ft (270 m)		CNA5			44°06′11″N 79°07′42″W
Vermilion Bay	Vermilion Bay Water Aerodrome	PU		Wilderness Air	1,229 ft (375 m)		CKH6			49°53′00″N 93°24′00″W
Vittoria	Vittoria/Heli-Lynx Heliport	PR		Heli-Lynx Helicopters	778 ft (237 m)		CHL4			42°48′09″N 80°24′07″W
Walkerton	Walkerton (County Of Bruce General Hospital) Heliport	PR		County Of Bruce General Hospital	875 ft (267 m)		CNG6			44°07′16″N 81°09′08″W
Wallaceburg	Wallaceburg/Chatham-Kent Health Alliance (Wallaceburg) Heliport	PR		Chatham-Kent Health Alliance	581 ft (177 m)		CSY7			42°35′57″N 82°22′00″W
Walshingham	Walsingham/Ceilidh Aerodrome	PR		Paul Anderson	716 ft (218 m)		CCL7			42°41′27″N 80°30′00″W
Walter's Falls	Walter's Falls (Piper Way) Aerodrome	PR		Paul Irwin	1,400 ft (430 m)		CWF2			44°27′51″N 80°37′15″W
Wapekeka First Nation	Angling Lake/Wapekeka Airport	PU		Government of Ontario	713 ft (217 m)		CKB6	YAX		53°50′57″N 89°34′46″W
Washago	Washago/Clearwater Lake North Heliport	PR		Ashlynne Dale	820 ft (250 m)		CLK6			44°48′46″N 79°14′29″W
Washago	Washago/Clearwater Lake Water Aerodrome	PU		David Gallagher	820 ft (250 m)		CCW6			44°48′07″N 79°14′30″W
Washago	Washago/Clearwater Lake North Water Aerodrome	PR		Ashlynne Dale	820 ft (250 m)		CLK5			44°48′46″N 79°14′29″W
Waterdown	Hamilton/Waterdown Heliport	PR		Highway 6 Heliport	794 ft (242 m)		CWD3			43°19′27″N 79°56′09″W
Regional Municipality of Waterloo	Region of Waterloo International Airport (Kitchener/Waterloo Regional Airport)	PU	180	Regional Municipality of Waterloo	1,054 ft (321 m)	CYKF		YKF		43°27′32″N 80°22′39″W
Wawa	Wawa Airport	PU		The Corporation of the Municipality of Wawa	944 ft (288 m)	CYXZ		YXZ		47°58′01″N 84°47′11″W
Webequie First Nation	Webequie Airport	PU		Government of Ontario - MTO	685 ft (209 m)	CYWP		YWP		52°57′34″N 87°22′31″W
Welland	Niagara Central Dorothy Rungeling Airport (Welland/Niagara Central Dorothy Rungeling Airport)	PU	CANPASS	Niagara Central Airport Commission	585 ft (178 m)		CNQ3			42°58′48″N 79°19′29″W
Welland	Welland (Niagara Health System) Heliport	PR		Niagara Health System	585 ft (178 m)		CPB3			42°58′39″N 79°14′59″W
West Guilford (Kennisis Lake)	Kennisis Lake/Francis Water Aerodrome	PR		Keith R. Francis	1,212 ft (369 m)		CKS2			45°14′03″N 78°37′20″W
West Guilford (Kennisis Lake)	Kennisis Lake/Halminen Water Aerodrome	PR		Tandem Developments	1,212 ft (369 m)		CHM3			45°11′42″N 78°40′29″W
West Guilford (Kennisis Lake)	Kennisis Lake/Jenny's Landing Water Aerodrome	PR		Robert Baldasaro	1,212 ft (369 m)		CKL4			45°14′22″N 78°36′33″W
West Guilford	West Guilford/Redstone Lake Water Aerodrome	PR		R. Miller	1,190 ft (360 m)		CRL6			45°12′36″N 78°32′46″W
Westport	Westport/Rideau Lakes Airport	PU		Rideau Lakes Flying Club	508 ft (155 m)		CRL2			44°39′56″N 76°23′55″W
Wheatley	Wheatley (Robinson Motorcycles) Aerodrome	PR		Derek Robinson	617 ft (188 m)		CRM5			42°08′35″N 82°21′48″W
Whitefish	Whitefish/Lake Panache Water Aerodrome	PR		Paul Fredette	719 ft (219 m)		CPN9			46°16′41″N 81°20′16″W
White Lake	White Lake Water Aerodrome	PU		White Lake Marina/Gartner Aviation	295 ft (90 m)		CWL2			45°19′26″N 76°29′10″W
White River	White River Water Aerodrome	PR		White River Air Service	1,380 ft (420 m)		CNJ8	YWR		48°37′37″N 85°13′24″W
Wiarton	Wiarton (Keppel) Airport; Wiarton (Keppel) Seaplane Landing	PU	15, 15/SEA	WIA Acquireco	728 ft (222 m)	CYVV		YVV		44°44′45″N 81°06′26″W
Wiarton	Wiarton/Hay Island Aerodrome	PR		Great Lakes Helicopters	765 ft (233 m)		CHA4			44°53′24″N 80°58′38″W
Wiarton	Wiarton/Beattie Lake Water Aerodrome	PR		Rick Kerr	685 ft (209 m)		CBT2			44°49′41″N 81°16′28″W
Winchester	Ottawa (Winchester District Memorial Hospital) Heliport	PR		Winchester District Memorial Hospital	258 ft (79 m)		CWH4			45°05′17″N 75°21′16″W
Windermere (Lake Rosseau)	Lake Rosseau/John's Bay Water Aerodrome	PU		Stephen Niblett	742 ft (226 m)		CLR2			45°10′13″N 79°35′52″W
Windermere	Windermere/Rostrevor Heliport	PR		2653224 Ontario Inc.	811 ft (247 m)		CRS6			45°11′00″N 79°34′04″W
Windsor	Windsor International Airport	PU	325 (450)	Your Quick Gateway (Windsor) Inc.	622 ft (190 m)	CYQG		YQG		42°16′32″N 82°57′19″W
Wingham	Wingham (Inglis Field) Aerodrome	PR		Tom Inglis	1,015 ft (309 m)		CWH5			43°53′47″N 81°20′11″W
Wingham	Wingham/Richard W. LeVan Aerodrome	PU	15	Tyler and Summer Papple	1,067 ft (325 m)		CPR7			43°52′03″N 81°17′55″W
Woodstock	Woodstock (Norm Beckham/Bob Hewitt Field) Aerodrome	PU		Dave Hewitt	1,040 ft (320 m)		CPR5			43°06′35″N 80°49′15″W
Woodstock	Woodstock (Hospital) Heliport	PR		Honeywell/Woodstock Hospital	1,046 ft (319 m)		CWH3			43°06′20″N 80°45′16″W
Wroxeter	Wroxeter/Harkes Field Aerodrome	PR		Doug Harkes	1,115 ft (340 m)		CHF5			43°51′27″N 81°08′35″W
Wunnumin Lake First Nation	Wunnumin Lake Airport	PU		Government of Ontario - MTO	819 ft (250 m)		CKL3	WNN		52°53′38″N 89°17′21″W
York	Grand River Executive Airport	PU		Near North Aviation	670 ft (200 m)		CPP6			43°02′15″N 79°51′09″W
Zephyr	Zephyr/Dillon Field Aerodrome	PR		Matthew Dillon	262 ft (80 m)	CZF2				44°11′51″N 79°18′32″W

== Defunct airports ==
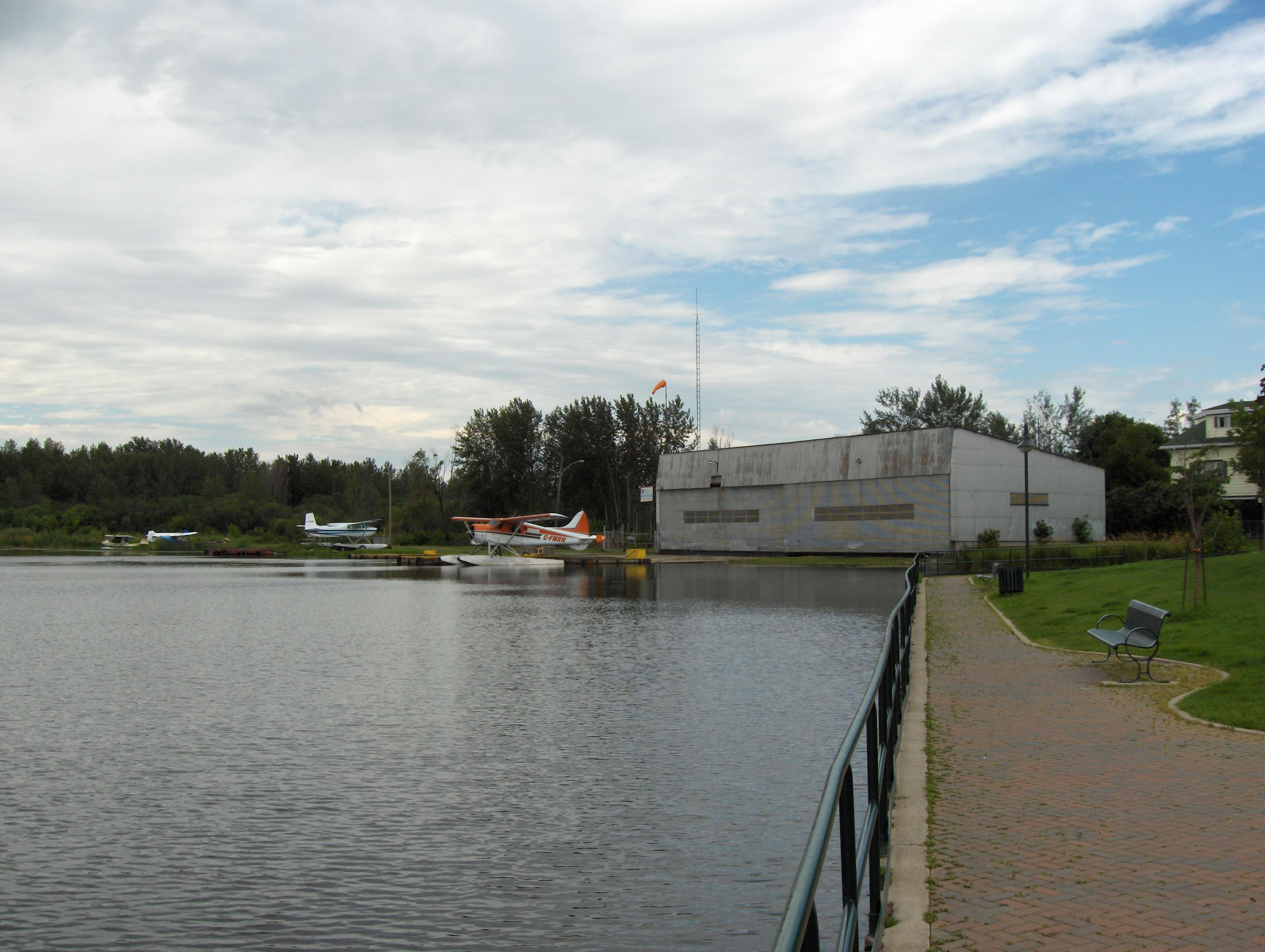
Timmins/Porcupine Lake Water Aerodrome

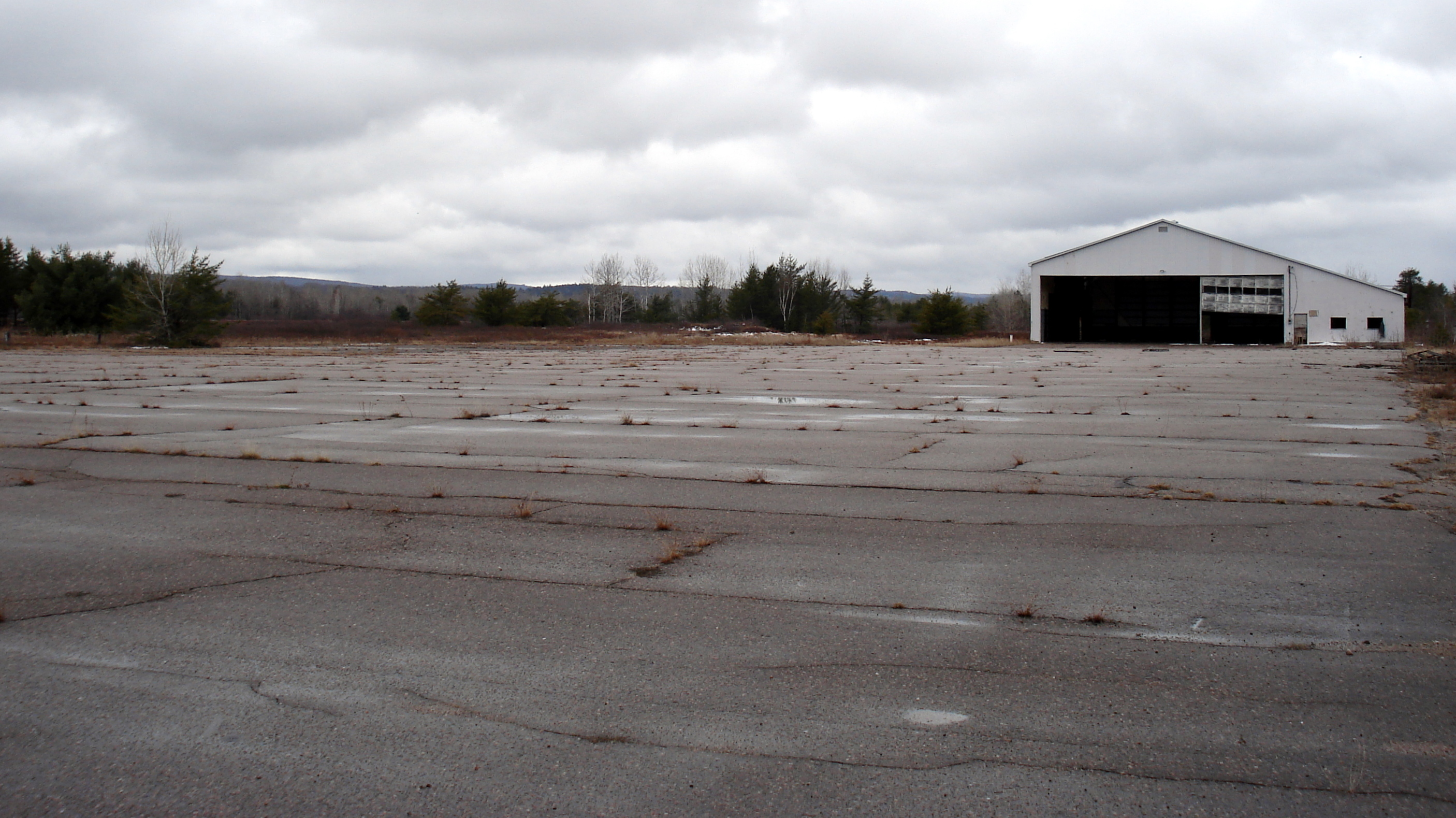
Killaloe/Bonnechere Airport

Community	Airport name	ICAO	TC LID	IATA	Coordinates
Alliston	RCAF Detachment Alliston				44°07′12″N 079°49′12″W
Armstrong	Armstrong/Waweig Lake Water Aerodrome		CKN6		50°08′00″N 089°07′00″W
Arthur	Arthur (Arthur South) Aerodrome		CAR5		43°46′59″N 80°26′01″W
Arthur	Arthur (Metz Field) Aerodrome		CMZ2		43°48′38″N 080°26′09″W
Atwood	Atwood Airport		CNN4		43°41′39″N 081°00′09″W
Barrie	Barrie/Little Lake Water Aerodrome		CPT5		44°25′00″N 079°40′00″W
Batchawana Bay	Batchawana Water Aerodrome		CNF5		46°55′00″N 084°36′00″W
Beaverton	Beaverton Aerodrome		CBV2		44°26′51″N 79°06′01″W
Beaverton	Beaverton North Aerodrome		CBN7		44°27′34″N 79°07′34″W
Belwood	Belwood (Ellen Field) Aerodrome		CEF2		43°48′20″N 80°22′26″W
Belwood	Belwood (Wright Field) Aerodrome		CBW6		43°47′38″N 080°24′09″W
Buttonville	Buttonville Municipal Airport (Toronto/Buttonville Municipal Airport)	CYKZ		YKZ	43°51′44″N 79°22′12″W
Caledonia	Caledonia/Grand River Water Aerodrome		CNC6		43°05′10″N 080°03′06″W
Canton	Canton Aerodrome		CTN7		44°00′10″N 78°21′43″W
Chapleau	Chapleau Water Airport		CNL5		47°51′00″N 083°24′00″W
Combermere	Combermere/Kamaniskeg Lake Water Aerodrome		CNP5		45°23′00″N 77°39′00″W
Curries	Curries (Rand Private Airfield) Aerodrome		CRE3		43°03′59″N 80°42′01″W
Deer Lake First Nation	Deer Lake/Keyamawun Water Aerodrome		CJZ7		52°40′00″N 094°25′00″W
Deer Lake First Nation	Deer Lake Water Aerodrome		CJA8		52°37′00″N 094°03′00″W
Dorset	Dorset/Kawagama Lake (Old Mill Marina) Water Aerodrome		CNK5		45°16′00″N 078°48′30″W
Dunnville	RCAF Station Dunnville				42°52′20″N 079°35′45″W
Dunnville	Dunnville Airport		CDU9		42°52′20″N 079°35′45″W
Durham	Durham (Mulock) Airport		CNH3		44°13′45″N 080°54′50″W
Dutton	Dutton Aerodrome		CDT7		42°39′33″N 81°30′45″W
Eagle River	Eagle River Airport		CKX3		49°45′00″N 093°08′00″W
Ear Falls	Ear Falls Airport	CYMY			50°43′04″N 093°23′01″W
East York	Leaside Aerodrome (RCAF Station Leaside)				43°42′46″N 079°21′33″W
Elk Lake	Elk Lake Airport		CPE3		47°43′43″N 80°18′57″W
Elmira	Elmira (East) Airport		CPG4		43°35′31″N 80°30′44″W
Fergus	Fergus (Royland Field) Aerodrome		CPR9		43°44′31″N 080°23′07″W
Five Mile Lake	Five Mile Lake Water Aerodrome		CNY5		47°34′00″N 083°13′00″W
Fort Erie	Fort Erie Airport		CNJ3		42°55′00″N 078°57′20″W
Gakijiwanong Anishinaabe Nation	Lac La Croix Water Aerodrome		CJU9		48°21′00″N 92°12′00″W
Gananoque	RCAF Detachment Gananoque				44°24′05″N 76°14′35″W
Gananoque	Gananoque Water Aerodrome		CGN1		44°19′30″N 076°09′25″W
Geraldton	Geraldton/Hutchison Lake Water Aerodrome		CNE6		49°47′04″N 86°56′27″W
Gowganda	Gowganda/Gowganda Lake Water Aerodrome		CPL6		47°39′02″N 080°47′07″W
Grand Bend	RCAF Detachment Grand Bend				43°17′00″N 81°43′00″W
Grand Valley	Grand Valley (Madill Field) Aerodrome		CGV4		43°51′41″N 080°15′57″W
Haliburton	Haliburton Water Aerodrome		CNF6		45°00′30″N 078°34′00″W
Hawkesbury	Hawkesbury (Windover Field) Airport		CPD8		45°33′52″N 074°48′35″W
Highgate	Highgate (South) Aerodrome		CHS2		42°28′25″N 081°49′19″W
Huntsville	Huntsville/Deerhurst Resort Airport		CDH1		45°21′15″N 079°09′05″W
Killaloe	Killaloe/Bonnechere Airport	CYXI		YXI	45°39′47″N 077°36′10″W
Kincardine	Kincardine (Ellis Field) Airport		CNK2		44°09′22″N 081°24′02″W
King City	King City Airport				43°54′21″N 079°33′35″W
Kingston	Kingston Airfield				44°15′04″N 076°30′10″W
Kingston	Kingston Water Aerodrome		CKN2		44°14′27″N 76°36′13″W
Lefroy	Lefroy Airport		CPQ4		44°18′00″N 079°33′00″W
Listowel	Listowel Airport		CPN5		43°44′34″N 80°59′29″W
Little Current	Little Current Water Aerodrome		CNZ9		45°59′02″N 081°57′31″W
Long Branch	Long Branch Aerodrome				43°34′26″N 079°33′16″W
Lucknow	Lucknow Airpark		CLK3		43°58′04″N 081°29′36″W
Mac Tier	Mac Tier/Francis Island Water Aerodrome		CPZ7		45°09′01″N 080°01′09″W
Madawaska	Madawaska Collins Field Aerodrome		CMW4		45°30′27″N 77°59′26″W
Manotick	Ottawa/Manotick (Hope Field) Aerodrome		CHF2		45°11′26″N 75°42′31″W
Moosonee	Moosonee Water Aerodrome		CNB7		51°16′00″N 80°39′00″W
Mount Hope	RCAF Station Hamilton				43°10′25″N 079°56′06″W
Murillo	Murillo/Hane Field Aerodrome		CHF5		48°26′51″N 89°32′12″W
Nakina	Nakina/Lower Twin Lake Water Aerodrome		CTL9		50°09′30″N 086°35′14″W
New Liskeard	New Liskeard Airport		CPX3		47°32′00″N 079°37′00″W
New Lowell	New Lowell Airport		CPE7		44°23′15″N 079°56′36″W
Niagara Falls	Niagara Falls/Niagara South Airport		CNF9		42°59′58″N 79°03′49″W
Nobel	Nobel/Lumsden Air Park		CNL7		45°24′30″N 80°04′41″W
Nobleton	Nobleton Airport		CPW3		43°56′12″N 079°40′47″W
North York	Barker Field				43°42′54″N 079°27′22″W
North York	Downsview Airfield (Downsview Airport, Toronto/Downsview Airport)				43°44′37″N 079°27′59″W
Norwood	Norwood Airport		CPY4		44°21′54″N 077°59′59″W
Oshawa	RCAF Station Oshawa				43°53′00″N 78°54′00″W
Orangeville	Orangeville/Rosehill Aerodrome		COR8		43°54′07″N 80°01′26″W
Orangeville	Orangeville/Brundle Field Aerodrome		COB4		43°52′30″N 080°10′51″W
Orton	Orton/Smith Field Airport		CPS7		43°46′30″N 080°13′41″W
Palmerston	Palmerston Airport		CPR3		43°51′13″N 080°46′49″W
Parry Sound	Parry Sound/Derbyshire Island Water Aerodrome		CDS6		45°14′41″N 080°09′18″W
Pays Plat	Pays Plat Water Aerodrome		CNM7		48°53′00″N 087°35′00″W
Perry Lake	Perry Lake Water Aerodrome		CPT6		48°31′57″N 080°06′26″W
Picton	Picton Airport		CNT7		43°59′21″N 77°08′21″W
Pikangikum First Nation	Pikangikum Water Aerodrome		CKH4		51°48′00″N 093°59′00″W
Port Albert	RCAF Station Port Albert				43°53′00″N 81°42′00″W
Port Elgin	Port Elgin (Pryde Field) Airport		CPG6		44°27′32″N 081°22′47″W
Port Loring	Arnstein Airport		CNR9		45°55′32″N 079°55′40″W
Queensville	Queensville (Rollick Airpark) Aerodrome		CRA2		44°08′27″N 79°29′05″W
Ridgetown	Ridgetown (Carnie Airfield) Aerodrome		CRN2		42°25′29″N 81°51′58″W
Rodney	Rodney (New Glasgow) Airport		CPU3		42°31′53″N 81°36′25″W
Rosseau	Lake Rosseau/Cameron Bay Water Aerodrome		CPQ6		45°15′00″N 079°39′00″W
Rosseau	Lake Rosseau/Morgan Bay Water Aerodrome		CMB4		45°13′17″N 079°40′06″W
Selkirk	Selkirk/Kindy Airstrip		CTK7		42°51′04″N 079°52′45″W
Sioux Narrows	Sioux Narrows Airport		CKM2		49°23′24″N 093°59′43″W
Stewart Lake	Stewart Lake Water Aerodrome		CKV5		49°49′00″N 93°43′00″W
St. Joseph Island	St. Joseph Island Airport		CPV3		46°17′00″N 83°57′00″W
Stoney Point	Stoney Point (Trepanier) Aerodrome		CRJ5		42°17′20″N 082°35′54″W
Straffordville	Straffordville Airport		CNS6		42°44′18″N 080°49′00″W
Terrace Bay	Terrace Bay Airport	CYTJ		YTJ	48°48′48″N 087°05′58″W
Thamesford	Thamesford (Harydale Farms) Aerodrome		CHD4		43°06′30″N 81°01′09″W
Thessalon	Thessalon Municipal Airport		CPL5		46°19′00″N 083°32′00″W
Timmins	Timmins/Porcupine Lake Water Aerodrome		CPW5		48°29′00″N 081°12′00″W
Toronto	Armour Heights Field				43°44′27″N 079°25′20″W
Toronto	De Lesseps Field				43°41′56″N 079°29′47″W
Toronto	Downsview Airport (Toronto/Downsview Airport, Downsview Airfield)	CYZD		YZD	43°44′34″N 079°27′56″W
Toronto	Toronto Aerodrome				43°44′56″N 079°27′39″W
Upsala	Cushing Lake Water Aerodrome		CJT7		48°56′39″N 090°30′31″W
Vaughan	Maple Airport				43°50′36″N 079°31′37″W
Victor Diamond Mine	Victor Mine Aerodrome		CVM2		52°49′58″N 83°55′43″W
Washago	Washago Aerodrome		CWS2		44°44′26″N 79°21′43″W
Willowdale	Willowdale Airfield				43°46′11″N 079°25′36″W
Winchester	Winchester Airport		CNA8		45°02′44″N 075°18′12″W
Windermere	Windermere Airport		CNW2		45°09′45″N 079°32′07″W
Windermere	Lake Rosseau/Windermere Water Aerodrome		CNP2		45°10′00″N 079°32′00″W
Winisk 90	Winisk Airport				55°16′00″N 85°11′00″W
Wyevale	Wyevale (Boker Field) Airport		CNL8		44°39′19″N 79°52′44″W

== See also ==
- List of airports in the Ottawa area
- List of airports in the Greater Toronto Area
