= Štajner =

Štajner (Slavic form of German Steiner) may refer to:

- Jiří Štajner (born 1976), Czech football striker
- Karlo Štajner (1902–1992), Yugoslavian communist activist and author of Austrian origin
- Tamara Štajner (born 1987), Slovenian violist and writer

== See also ==
- Stainer
