= Kennisis Lake Water Aerodrome =

Kennisis Lake Water Aerodrome may refer to:

- Kennisis Lake/Francis Water Aerodrome (CKS2), Kennisis Lake, Ontario, Canada
- Kennisis Lake/Halminen Water Aerodrome (CHM3), Kennisis Lake, Ontario, Canada
- Kennisis Lake/Jenny's Landing Water Aerodrome (CKL4), Kennisis Lake, Ontario, Canada
