= Stayner =

Stayner may refer to:

== People ==
=== Surname ===
- Arthur Stayner (1835–1899), English-born American horticulturist
- Cary Stayner (b. 1961), American serial killer
- Sir Richard Stayner, English naval officer who served during the First Anglo-Dutch War (1652–1654)
- Steven Stayner (1965–1989), American kidnapping victim

=== Given name ===
- Stayner Richards (1885–1953), Mormon missionary in the United Kingdom and a general authority of The Church of Jesus Christ of Latter-Day Saints from 1951 to 1953

== Places ==
- Stayner, a village in the township of Clearview, Ontario, Canada
  - Stayner (Clearview Field) Aerodrome, an airport near Stayner, Ontario, Canada
  - Stayner Siskins, a Canadian junior ice hockey team based in Stayner, Ontario

== Ships ==
- HMS Stayner (K573), a British frigate in commission in the Royal Navy from 1943 to 1945

== See also ==
- Stainer
