= Ogoki Post Airport =

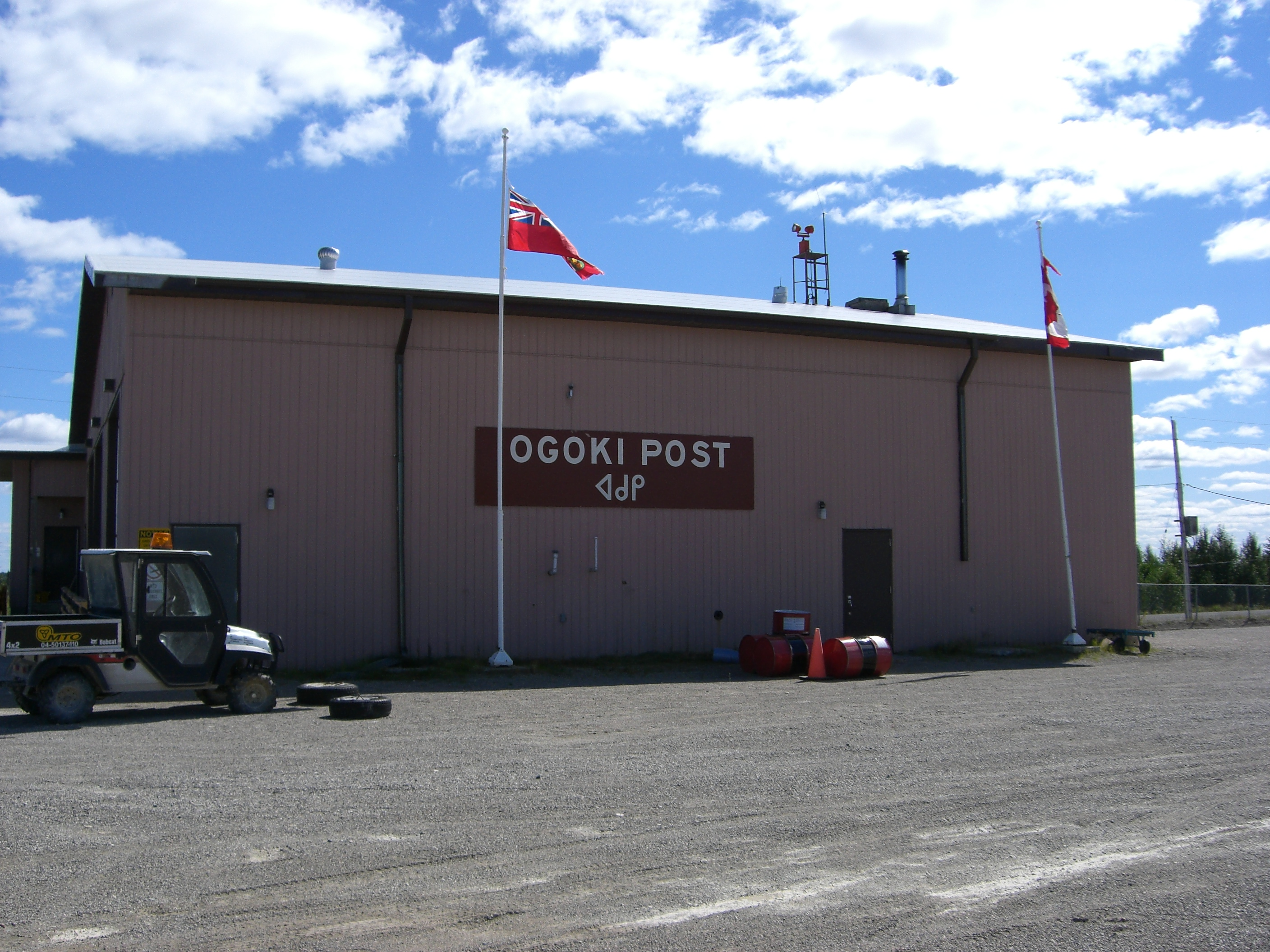
- IATA: YOG; ICAO: CYKP; WMO: 71652

Summary
- Airport type: Public
- Operator: Government of Ontario
- Location: Marten Falls First Nation
- Time zone: EST (UTC−05:00)
  - Summer (DST): EDT (UTC−04:00)
- Elevation AMSL: 594 ft / 181 m
- Coordinates: 51°39′31″N 085°54′04″W

Map
- Location in Ontario

Runways
Direction	Length		Surface
Direction	ft	m	Surface
09/27	3,514	1,071	Gravel
- Sources: Canada Flight Supplement

Ogoki Post Airport (IATA: YOG, ICAO: CYKP) is a single-runway airport located 2 nautical miles (3.7 km; 2.3 mi) northeast of Marten Falls First Nation (Ogoki Post) near the confluence of the Ogoki and Albany rivers in Ontario, Canada.

== Airlines and destinations ==
Airlines	Destinations
Nakina Air Service	Fort Hope/Eabametoong, Nakina/Greenstone, Neskantaga, Thunder Bay, Webequie
North Star Air	Thunder Bay
