= YWP =

YWP may refer to:

- Yorkshire Wildlife Park, a zoo and tourist attraction in Branton, South Yorkshire, England
- Webequie Airport, Ontario, Canada, IATA code YWP
