= Nakina Airport =

R. Elmer Ruddick Nakina Airport
- IATA: YQN; ICAO: CYQN

Summary
- Airport type: Public
- Operator: The Loomex Group
- Location: Nakina, Ontario
- Time zone: EST (UTC−05:00)
  - Summer (DST): EDT (UTC−04:00)
- Elevation AMSL: 1,052 ft / 321 m
- Coordinates: 50°10′59″N 086°41′51″W

Map
- Location in Ontario

Runways
Direction	Length		Surface
Direction	ft	m	Surface
09/27	3,500	1,067	Asphalt

Statistics (2010)
- Aircraft movements: 6,696
- Source: Canada Flight Supplement; Movements from Statistics Canada

R. Elmer Ruddick Nakina Airport, or simply Nakina Airport (IATA: YQN, ICAO: CYQN), is located adjacent to Nakina, Ontario, Canada.

== Airlines and destinations ==
Airlines	Destinations
Nakina Air Service	Fort Hope/Eabametoong, Neskantaga, Ogoki Post, Thunder Bay, Webequie

== See also ==
- Nakina Water Aerodrome
- Nakina/Lower Twin Lake Water Aerodrome
