= CYFH =

CYFH may refer to:

- Can You Forgive Her?, an 1865 novel by Anthony Trollope
- "Can You Forgive Her?" (song), a 1993 song by Pet Shop Boys
- Fort Hope Airport, airport in Ontario, Canada
