= Steiner =

Steiner may refer to:

== People ==
- Steiner (surname)
- Steiner Brothers, a professional wrestling tag team
- Steiner Brothers (tap-dancing trio), a 1950s–1960s Canadian act
- Felix Steiner, German SS General

== Places ==
- Steiner, Michigan, U.S.
- Steiner, Mississippi, U.S.

== Math and science ==
- Steiner's theorem, or parallel axis theorem
- Steiner tree
- Poncelet–Steiner theorem
- Steiner surface
- Steiner system, a type of block design
- Steiner point (disambiguation)

== Other uses ==
- Steiner House, in Vienna, Austria
- Steiner Studios, a film and television production studio in New York City
- Franz Steiner Verlag, a German publisher

== See also ==
- Army Detachment Steiner, a temporary German military unit during the 1945 Battle of Berlin during World War II
- Waldorf education, also called Steiner education
