= Stainer =

Stainer is a surname. Notable people with the surname include:

- Annie Stainer
- Anna Stainer-Knittel
- Greg Stainer (born 1976), British musician
- Jacob Stainer (c. 1617–1683), Austrian luthier
- Johannes Maximus Stainer von Pleinfelden
- John Stainer (1840–1901), English classical composer and organist
- Klayton Stainer
- Pauline Stainer (born 1941), English poet
- Percy Stainer

== See also ==
- Stainer & Bell, British sheet music publishing company
- Stayner
- Steiner
- Štajner
