= Lansdowne House Airport =

- IATA: YLH; ICAO: CYLH

Summary
- Airport type: Public
- Operator: Government of Ontario
- Location: Neskantaga First Nation
- Time zone: EST (UTC−05:00)
  - Summer (DST): EDT (UTC−04:00)
- Elevation AMSL: 834 ft / 254 m
- Coordinates: 52°11′44″N 087°56′03″W

Map
- Location in Ontario

Runways
Direction	Length		Surface
Direction	ft	m	Surface
08/26	3,484	1,062	Gravel
- Source: Canada Flight Supplement

Lansdowne House Airport (IATA: YLH, ICAO: CYLH) is located 1.5 nautical miles (2.8 km; 1.7 mi) southwest of the First Nations community of Neskantaga (Lansdowne House), Ontario, Canada.

== Airlines and destinations ==
Airlines	Destinations
Nakina Air Service	Fort Hope/Eabametoong, Nakina/Greenstone, Ogoki Post, Thunder Bay, Webequie
North Star Air	Thunder Bay

The airport services small turboprop aircraft from an unmarked gravel runway.
