= Fort Hope Airport =

Airport in Ontario, Canada

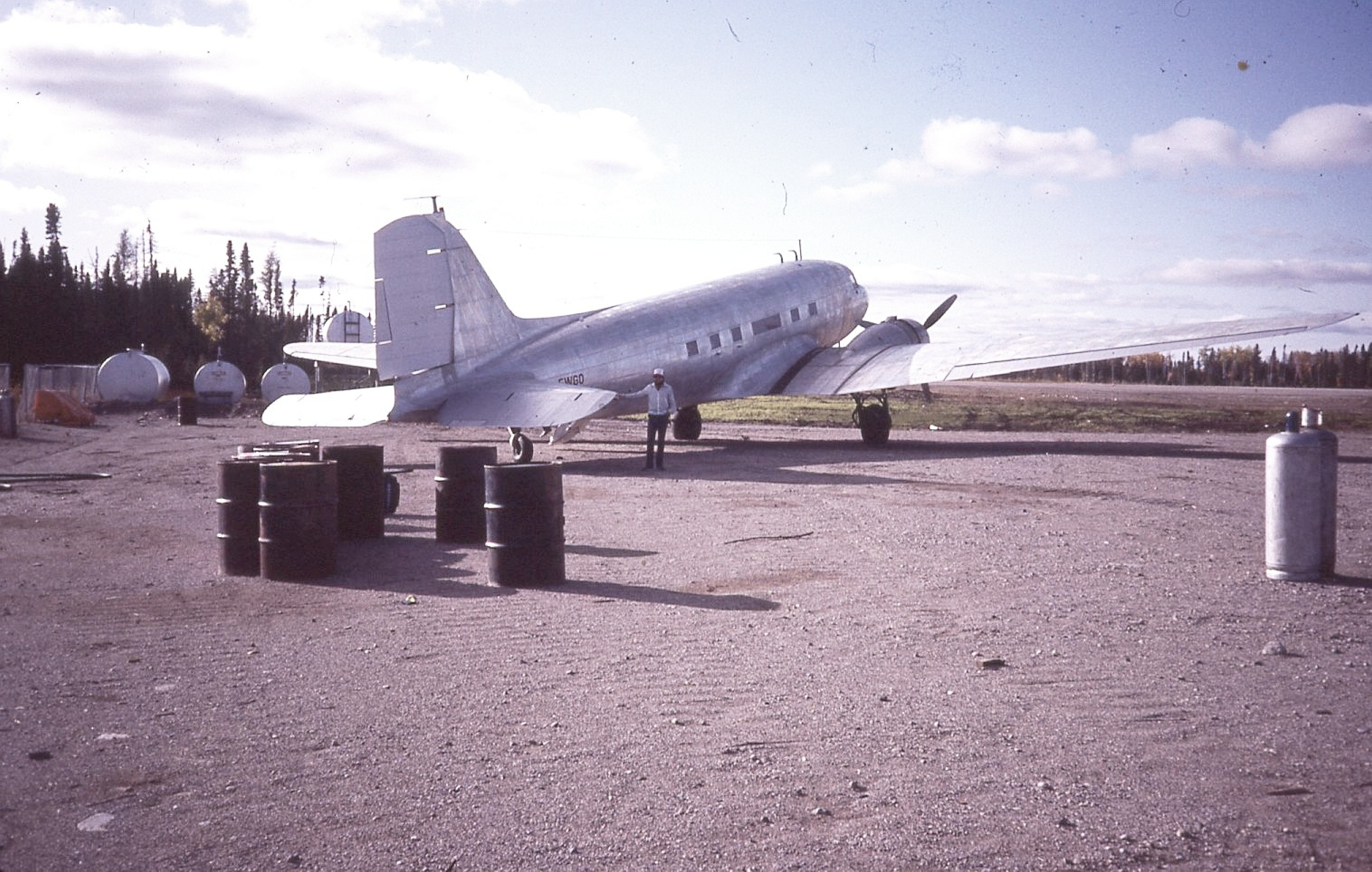
- A Douglas DC-3 parked at Fort Hope Airport in 1983
- IATA: YFH; ICAO: CYFH

Summary
- Airport type: Public
- Operator: Government of Ontario
- Location: Eabametoong First Nation
- Time zone: EST (UTC−05:00)
  - Summer (DST): EDT (UTC−04:00)
- Elevation AMSL: 899 ft (274 m)
- Coordinates: 51°33′43″N 087°54′28″W

Map
- Location in Ontario

Runways
Direction	Length		Surface
Direction	ft	m	Surface
09/27	3,497	1,066	Gravel
- Source: Canada Flight Supplement

Fort Hope Airport (IATA: YFH, ICAO: CYFH) is located adjacent to the First Nations community of Eabametoong, also known as Fort Hope, Ontario, Canada.

== Airlines and destinations ==
Airlines	Destinations
Nakina Air Service	Nakina/Greenstone
North Star Air	Neskantaga, Ogoki Post, Thunder Bay
Wasaya Airways	Pickle Lake, Summer Beaver/Nibinamik, Webequie
