= Kasabonika Airport =

- IATA: XKS; ICAO: CYAQ

Summary
- Airport type: Public
- Operator: Government of Ontario
- Location: Kasabonika Lake First Nation
- Time zone: CST (UTC−06:00)
  - Summer (DST): CDT (UTC−05:00)
- Elevation AMSL: 673 ft (205 m)
- Coordinates: 53°31′29″N 088°38′35″W

Map
- Location in Ontario

Runways
Direction	Length		Surface
Direction	ft	m	Surface
03/21	3,519	1,073	Gravel
- Sources: Canada Flight Supplement

Kasabonika Airport (IATA: XKS, ICAO: CYAQ) is an airport located 1 NM (1.9 km; 1.2 mi) west of the First Nations community of Kasabonika, Ontario, Canada.

It services the Kasabonika Lake First Nations Community and has daily passenger and cargo services. Wasaya Airways fly cargo flights here to supply the local Northern Store and also provide mail services from Canada Post. North Star Air provides cargo services on request and provide all package mail services for Canada Post.

== Airlines and destinations ==
Airlines	Destinations
Wasaya Airways	Sioux Lookout, Webequie
