= Steiner point =

A Steiner point (named after Jakob Steiner) may refer to:

- Steiner point (computational geometry), a point added in solving a geometric optimization problem to make its solution better
- Steiner point (triangle), a certain point on the circumcircle of a given triangle
- One of 20 points associated with a given set of six points on a conic; see Pascal's theorem § Hexagrammum Mysticum

== See also ==
- Steiner tree problem, an algorithmic problem of finding extra Steiner points to add to a point set to reduce the cost of connecting the points
  - The median of three vertices in a median graph, the solution to the Steiner tree problem for those three vertices
  - The Fermat point of a triangle, the solution to the Steiner tree problem for the three vertices of the triangle
