= Nakina Air Service =

Canadian airline

Nakina Outpost Camps and Air Service
IATA	CDD	Call sign
T2	KN	NAKINA
- Founded: 1973
- AOC #: 2807
- Hubs: Nakina Airport
- Fleet size: 4
- Headquarters: Nakina, Ontario, Canada
- Key people: Don Bourdignon, CEO; Greg Bourdignon, Chief Pilot
- Website: http://nakinaairservice.com/

Nakina Outpost Camps and Air Service is a small Canadian airline based in Nakina, Ontario.

== Fleet ==
Currently, the Nakina Air Service fleet consists of 4 aircraft:

Nakina Air Service fleet
Aircraft	Count	Variants	Notes
Cessna 185 Skywagon	1	A185F	3 passengers
de Havilland Canada DHC-3 Otter	2	DHC-3-T Turbo-Otter	8 passengers

Former fleet:

- Cessna 208B
- Pilatus PC-12
- DHC-6 Twin Otter
