= Webequie Airport =

- IATA: YWP; ICAO: CYWP

Summary
- Airport type: Public
- Operator: Government of Ontario - MTO
- Location: Webequie First Nation
- Time zone: EST (UTC−05:00)
  - Summer (DST): EDT (UTC−04:00)
- Elevation AMSL: 685 ft (209 m)
- Coordinates: 52°57′34″N 087°22′31″W

Map
- Location in Ontario

Runways
Direction	Length		Surface
Direction	ft	m	Surface
02/20	3,525	1,074	Gravel
- Source: Canada Flight Supplement

Webequie Airport (IATA: YWP, ICAO: CYWP) is located 1 nautical mile (1.9 km; 1.2 mi) south southwest of the First Nations community of Webequie, Ontario, Canada.

== Airlines and destinations ==
Airlines	Destinations
North Star Air	Fort Hope/Eabametoong, Neskantaga, Thunder Bay
Wasaya Airways	Fort Hope/Eabametoong, Kasabonika Lake, Pickle Lake, Sioux Lookout, Summer Beaver/Nibinamik
