= 98.1 FM =

FM radio frequency

The following radio stations broadcast on FM frequency 98.1 MHz:

== Argentina ==
- Radio María in Alta Gracia, Córdoba
- Radio María in Rosario del Tala, Entre Ríos
- Radio María in Emilia, Santa Fe
- Show in Posadas, Misiones
- Sport Casilda in Casilda, Santa Fe

== Australia ==
- ABC NewsRadio in Gosford, New South Wales
- 2WIN in Illawarra, New South Wales
- 2VLY in Muswellbrook, New South Wales
- Radio National in Yulara, Northern Territory
- Vision Radio Network in Townsville, Queensland
- Radio TAB in Coober Pedy, South Australia
- Radio National in Corryong, Victoria
- 3ECB in Melbourne, Victoria
- The Spirit Network in Geraldton, Western Australia

== Belize ==
- LOVE FM

== Brazil ==
- Rádio Globo in Rio de Janeiro, Rio de Janeiro

== Canada ==
- CBAF-FM-23 in Kedgwick, New Brunswick
- CBMF-FM in St-Jovite, Quebec
- CBOF-FM-6 in Cornwall, Ontario
- CBON-FM in Sudbury, Ontario
- CBSI-FM in Sept-Iles, Quebec
- CBTQ-FM in Port Alberni, British Columbia
- CBVA-FM in Escuminac, Quebec
- CBXJ-FM in Jasper, Alberta
- CFCW-FM in Camrose, Alberta
- CFGE-FM-1 in Magog, Quebec
- CFMQ-FM in Hudson Bay, Saskatchewan
- CHFI-FM in Toronto, Ontario
- CHOI-FM in Quebec City, Quebec
- CHON-FM in Whitehorse, Yukon
- CHPB-FM in Cochrane, Ontario
- CHRH-FM in Rocky Harbour, Newfoundland and Labrador
- CHSU-FM-1 in Big White Ski, British Columbia
- CHTD-FM in St. Stephen, New Brunswick
- CIFS-FM in Tumbler Ridge, British Columbia
- CIGV-FM-2 in Princeton, British Columbia
- CJTL-FM-1 in Thunder Bay, Ontario
- CKBW-FM in Bridgewater, Nova Scotia
- CKLO-FM in London, Ontario
- CKBD-FM in Lethbridge, Alberta
- VF2038 in Upper Liard, Yukon
- VF2059 in Fermont, Quebec
- VF2117 in Kitkatla, British Columbia
- VF2119 in Prince Rupert, British Columbia
- VF2134 in Canim Lake, British Columbia
- VF2141 in Dease Lake, British Columbia
- VF2147 in Destruction Bay, Yukon
- VF2163 in Hazelton, British Columbia
- VF2165 in Kitwanga, British Columbia
- VF2166 in Tachie, British Columbia
- VF2226 in Canyon City, British Columbia
- VF2231 in Fort Babine, British Columbia
- VF2234 in Stony Creek Indian Reserve, British Columbia
- VF2274 in Fort Fraser, British Columbia
- VF2277 in Wells, British Columbia
- VF2306 in Atlin, British Columbia
- VF2311 in Lower Post, British Columbia
- VF2353 in Good Hope Indian Reserve, British Columbia
- VF2451 in Voisey Bay, Newfoundland and Labrador
- VF2472 in Fort Simpson, Northwest Territories
- VF2514 in Blue River, British Columbia
- VF2549 in Pemberton, British Columbia
- VF2582 in Havre St-Pierre, Quebec

== China ==
- CNR Business Radio in Yantai
- CRI News Radio in Yizhou
- SMG KFM981 in Shanghai
- Wuhua People's Radio

== France ==
- AlterNantes in Nantes

== Ireland ==
- 98FM in Dublin
- RTÉ Lyric FM in Dungarvan

== Israel ==
- Ashams Radio in the Triangle and the coastal plain

== Malaysia ==
- Nasional FM in Brunei
- Zayan in Kedah, Perlis & Penang

== Mexico ==
- XHASU-FM in Asunción Nochixtlán, Oaxaca
- XHBCD-FM in Pachuca, Hidalgo
- XHCSAI-FM in San Luis Potosí, San Luis Potosí
- XHCV-FM in Ciudad Valles, San Luis Potosí
- XHELI-FM in Morelia, Michoacán
- XHGSE-FM in Guasave, Sinaloa
- XHIRC-FM in Colima, Colima
- XHKZ-FM in Santo Domingo Tehuantepec, Oaxaca
- XHLH-FM in Acaponeta, Nayarit
- XHMAXX-FM in San Martín Texmelucan, Puebla
- XHNG-FM in Cuernavaca, Morelos
- XHNM-FM in Jesús María, Aguascalientes
- XHPCPG-FM in Chilpancingo, Guerrero
- XHPJOA-FM in Navojoa, Sonora
- XHPNX-FM in Santiago Pinotepa Nacional, Oaxaca
- XHPSOT-FM in Soteapan, Veracruz
- XHPYA-FM in Playa del Carmen, Quintana Roo
- XHPZAM-FM in Zamora, Michoacán
- XHRL-FM in Monterrey, Nuevo León
- XHU-FM in Boca del Río, Veracruz
- XHWX-FM in Durango, Durango

== New Zealand ==
- Newstalk ZB at Ashburton, Canterbury, South Island

== South Korea ==
- CBS Standard FM in Seoul Metropolitan Area

== United Kingdom ==
- BBC Radio 1 in Barnstaple, Blaenavon, Bradford, Cwmafan, Firth of Clyde, Skye & Lochalsh, South Devon, Tyne and Wear
- Bro Radio in Barry

== United States ==
- KALG in Kaltag, Alaska
- KAYW in Meeker, Colorado
- KBAC in Las Vegas, New Mexico
- KBEW in Blue Earth, Minnesota
- KBUL in Carson City, Nevada
- KBWR-LP in Burns, Oregon
- KCFS-LP in El Dorado Hills, California
- KCTC-LP in San Antonio, Texas
- KDRU-LP in Springfield, Missouri
- KENL-LP in St. Paul, Minnesota
- KFGE in Milford, Nebraska
- KGTM in Shelley, Idaho
- KHAK in Cedar Rapids, Iowa
- KHUS (FM) in Huslia, Alaska
- KIMU-LP in Stockton, California
- KINC-LP in Little Rock, Arkansas
- KING in Seattle, Washington
- KIOR-LP in Omaha, Nebraska
- KISC in Spokane, Washington
- KISQ in San Francisco, California
- KJAJ-LP in Coos Bay, Oregon
- KJMQ in Lihue, Hawaii
- KKCL in Lorenzo, Texas
- KKFM in Colorado Springs, Colorado
- KKJG in San Luis Obispo, California
- KLEF in Anchorage, Alaska
- KMBZ in Kansas City, Kansas
- KMKE-LP in Eureka, California
- KNFS-LP in Tulare, California
- KOWW-LP in Burlington, North Dakota
- KOYU in Koyukuk, Alaska
- KOZX in Cabool, Missouri
- KPFV-LP in Pahrump, Nevada
- KQHU-LP in Honolulu, Hawaii
- KQTX in Quanah, Texas
- KRBY in Ruby, Alaska
- KREC in Brian Head, Utah
- KRRG in Laredo, Texas
- KRWI in Wofford Heights, California
- KRXV in Yermo, California
- KSKZ in Copeland, Kansas
- KSPL-LP in John Day, Oregon
- KSYU in Saint Marys, Alaska
- KTAL in Texarkana, Texas
- KTBX in Tubac, Arizona
- KTLT in Anson, Texas
- KTPB in Altheimer, Arkansas
- KUSN in Dearing, Kansas
- KVET in Austin, Texas
- KVIP in Redding, California
- KWLF in Fairbanks, Alaska
- KXSN in San Diego, California
- KYKY in Saint Louis, Missouri
- KZRC in Bennington, Oklahoma
- WACF-LP in Brookfield, Massachusetts
- WBRF in Galax, Virginia
- WBUL in Lexington, Kentucky
- WCTK in New Bedford, Massachusetts
- WCXQ-LP in Isabela-Camuy, Puerto Rico
- WCXV in Van Buren, Maine
- WDFM in Defiance, Ohio
- WDGL in Baton Rouge, Louisiana
- WDTZ-LP in Delhi Township, Ohio
- WEDB (FM) in East Dublin, Georgia
- WEUL in Kingsford, Michigan
- WEVT-LP in Enosburg Falls, Vermont
- WFGY in Altoona, Pennsylvania
- WGFN in Glen Arbor, Michigan
- WGUA-LP in Lawrence, Massachusetts
- WHWK in Binghamton, New York
- WHWY in Holt, Florida
- WHZT in Williamston, South Carolina
- WIBN in Earl Park, Indiana
- WILP in Cuba, Illinois
- WISM-FM in Altoona, Wisconsin
- WJJR in Rutland, Vermont
- WKCQ in Saginaw, Michigan
- WKDD in Canton, Ohio
- WKZE in Salisbury, Connecticut
- WLEZ-LP in Jackson, Mississippi
- WLKN in Cleveland, Wisconsin
- WLND in Signal Mountain, Tennessee
- WMGN in Madison, Wisconsin
- WMGP in Hogansville, Georgia
- WMRZ in Dawson, Georgia
- WMXI in Ellisville, Mississippi
- WNRE-LP in Duluth, Georgia
- WNUE in Deltona, Florida
- WOBX in Manteo, North Carolina
- WOCM in Selbyville, Delaware
- WOGL in Philadelphia, Pennsylvania
- WPTY-HD2 in Ronkonkoma, New York
- WQAQ in Hamden, Connecticut
- WQHL in Live Oak, Florida
- WQSM in Fayetteville, North Carolina
- WRAY in Princeton, Indiana
- WTVR in Richmond, Virginia
- WTXT in Fayette, Alabama
- WUDR in Dayton, Ohio
- WWJO in Saint Cloud, Minnesota
- WWLS-FM in The Village, Oklahoma
- WXHD in Santa Isabel, Puerto Rico
- WXMX in Millington, Tennessee
- WXNE-LP in Pontiac, South Carolina
- WXNZ-LP in Skowhegan, Maine
- WYBB in Folly Beach, South Carolina
- WZCL-LP in Cabo Rojo, Puerto Rico
- WZOE-FM in Princeton, Illinois

== Uganda ==
- Radio Rupiny

== Vietnam ==
- Ninh Binh Radio in Ninh Binh Province
