= Wasaya Airways Flight 125 =

2003 aviation accident in Canada

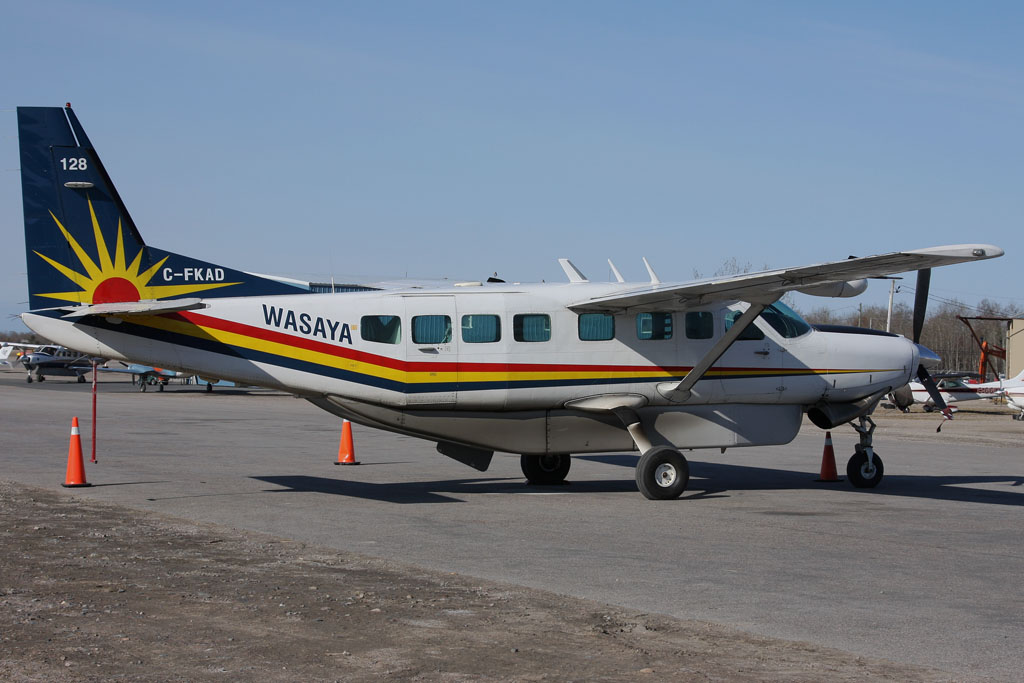
- A Wasaya Airways Cessna 208 Caravan, similar to the one involved in the accident

Accident
- Date: September 11, 2003
- Summary: Controlled flight into terrain
- Site: Near Nibinamik First Nation, Ontario, Canada

Aircraft
- Aircraft type: Cessna 208B Grand Caravan
- Operator: Wasaya Airways
- ICAO flight No.: WSG125
- Registration: C-FKAB
- Flight origin: Pickle Lake Airport, Pickle Lake, Ontario, Canada
- Destination: Summer Beaver Airport, Nibinamik First Nation, Ontario, Canada
- Occupants: 8
- Passengers: 7
- Crew: 1
- Fatalities: 8
- Survivors: 0

On September 11, 2003, a Cessna 208 Caravan operating as Wasaya Airways Flight 125 crashed while on a charter flight northwest of Nibinamik First Nation, Ontario, Canada, killing all eight occupants.

== Background ==
=== Aircraft ===
The aircraft involved was C-FKAD, a Cessna 208B Grand Caravan manufactured in 1992 and operated by Wasaya Airways. The aircraft was powered by a Pratt & Whitney Canada PT6 turboprop engine. It had a capacity of eleven people.

=== Passengers and crew ===
The flight was piloted by 25-year-old Jonathon Hulls. Hulls logged 2,351 flight hours, including 946 with the Caravan. He was employed with Wasaya Airways since March 2001, initially as first officer on the Caravan and the Pilatus PC-12. The required passenger manifest was not completed. Initially, this made it difficult to determine with certitude who was on board the aircraft at the time of the crash. The passengers were six men and a woman aged from 7 to 67. They were later identified as Nibinamik First Nation deputy chief Lawrence Yellowhead, band councillors Mike Wabasse and Richard Beaver, band co-ordinator Leonard Sugarhead, equipment operator Rudy Neshinapaise, Mr. Wabasse's sister-in-law, Violet Wabasse and her seven-year-old grandson, Nathan Wabasse. Examination of the wreckage confirmed that all of the passengers had been seated behind the cockpit bulkhead in the cabin, with no one occupying the copilot seat.

=== Weather ===
The area forecast for northwestern Ontario indicated a band of convective activity extending from Kenora to Hudson Bay. This was forecast to produce broken cloud layers between 3000 feet and 19,000 feet, with numerous embedded altocumulus castellanus clouds giving a visibility of four to six statute miles in rain showers and mist. Thunderstorms were predicted in the southern half of this weather area between Kenora and Pickle Lake. Moderate mechanical turbulence below 3000 feet above ground level was forecast for the entire area. The Pickle Lake terminal area forecast called for light westerly winds, visibility greater than 6 sm with a ceiling of 3000 feet. The Pickle Lake weather at the time of departure was as follows: light westerly winds, 12 sm visibility, temperature 21 °C, ceiling 3000 feet, with towering cumulus (TCU) cloud associated. At the time of the accident, the Pickle Lake weather was reported as follows: wind westerly at 7 knots, 12 sm visibility in light rain showers, and ceiling 2500 feet, with TCU cloud associated.

Summer Beaver does not have a weather reporting station; however, pilots operating in the area around the time of the accident reported strong southwesterly winds, moderate mechanical turbulence with no windshear, and visibility greater than 10 nm. There was a light rain shower observed at the aerodrome about 20 minutes after the time of the accident, but no rain at the time of the accident.

== Crash ==
The aircraft took off from Summer Beaver Airport at 7:30 p.m. and was expected to arrive an hour later. The flight proceeded on a direct routing to destination at 3,500 feet above sea level under night visual flight conditions. While on approach, the aircraft joined the circuit on a downwind leg for a landing on Runway 17. It crashed at 8:30 p.m. When the aircraft did not land, personnel at Summer Beaver Airport contacted the Pickle Lake flight dispatch to inquire about the flight. The aircraft was declared missing at approximately 11:30 p.m. following an unsuccessful radio search by the Pickle Lake flight dispatch staff. Search and rescue personnel found the wreckage at 2:10 a.m. in a wooded area three nautical miles northwest of the airport. The crash site was accessible only by helicopter. Aerodrome fire fighting services would have been unable to reach the site. The aircraft was nearly consumed by a post-crash fire. All eight people on board were killed. The crash occurred on the same day that a privately owned Cessna aircraft en route to Thunder Bay crashed in Winnipeg, killing both occupants.

== Aftermath and reactions ==
A funeral for the passengers was held on September 19. Assembly of First Nations National Chief Phil Fontaine expressed his deepest regrets and condolences to the victims and their families. Transport minister David Collenette expressed condolences to the victims. A memorial service is held annually in the community. A group of community members walk 14.5 kilometers on a road to the crash site to raise funds for travel costs and maintenance of the road.

== Investigation ==
The cause of the accident was controlled flight into terrain with the circumstances being unknown. The aircraft did not carry flight recorders. Weather was doubted as the cause, but was not ruled out.
