= Wasaya Airways =

First Nations-owned airline in Ontario, Canada

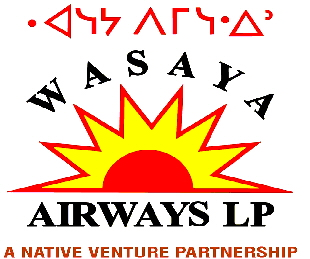

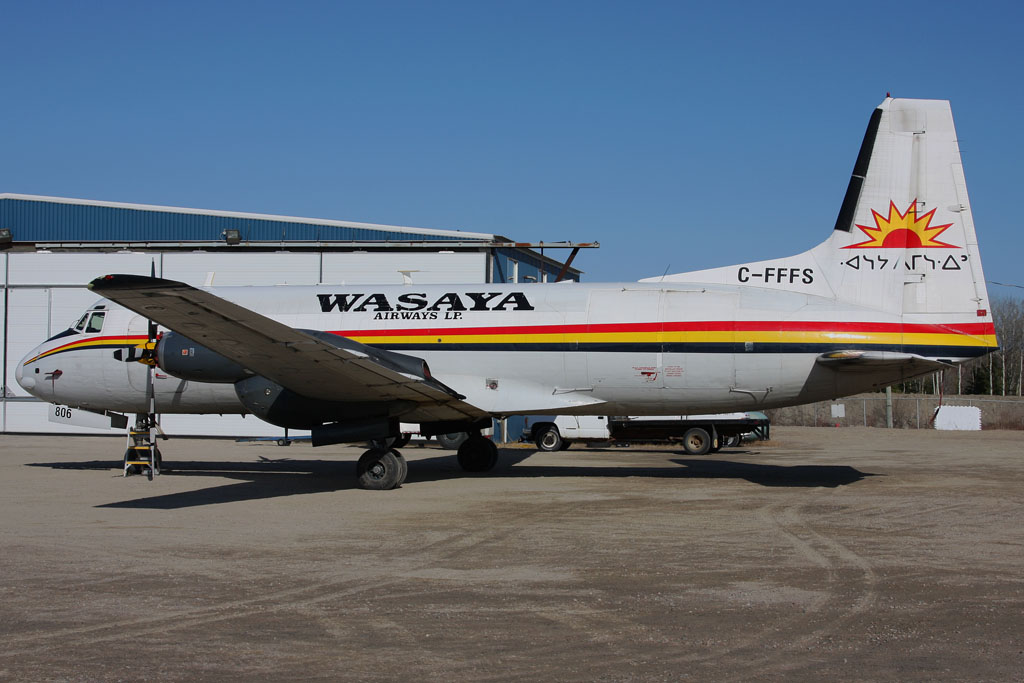
- Wasaya Airways Hawker Siddeley HS 748
IATA	ICAO	Call sign
WP	WSG	WASAYA
- Founded: 1989
- AOC #: 11802
- Hubs: Pickle Lake Airport; Red Lake Airport; Sioux Lookout Airport; Thunder Bay Airport
- Fleet size: 14
- Destinations: 24
- Parent company: Wasaya Group Inc.
- Headquarters: Thunder Bay, Ontario
- Key people: Paul Disley (President and CEO)
- Website: www.wasaya.com

Wasaya Airways LP (or in Oji-Cree ᐙᐦᓭᔮ ᐱᒥᐦᓭᐎᐣ (Waaseyaa Bimisewin); unpointed: ᐗᓭᔭ ᐱᒥᓭᐎᐣ) is a First Nations-owned domestic airline with its headquarters in Thunder Bay, Ontario, Canada. Its main hubs are the Thunder Bay Airport and the Sioux Lookout Airport; It also offers a charter and cargo service from a base in Red Lake Airport and Pickle Lake Airport. In 2003, Wasaya Airways bought the rights to serve remote First Nations communities from Bearskin Airlines. The airline also supplies food, clothing, hardware and other various supplies to 25 remote communities in Ontario.

== History ==
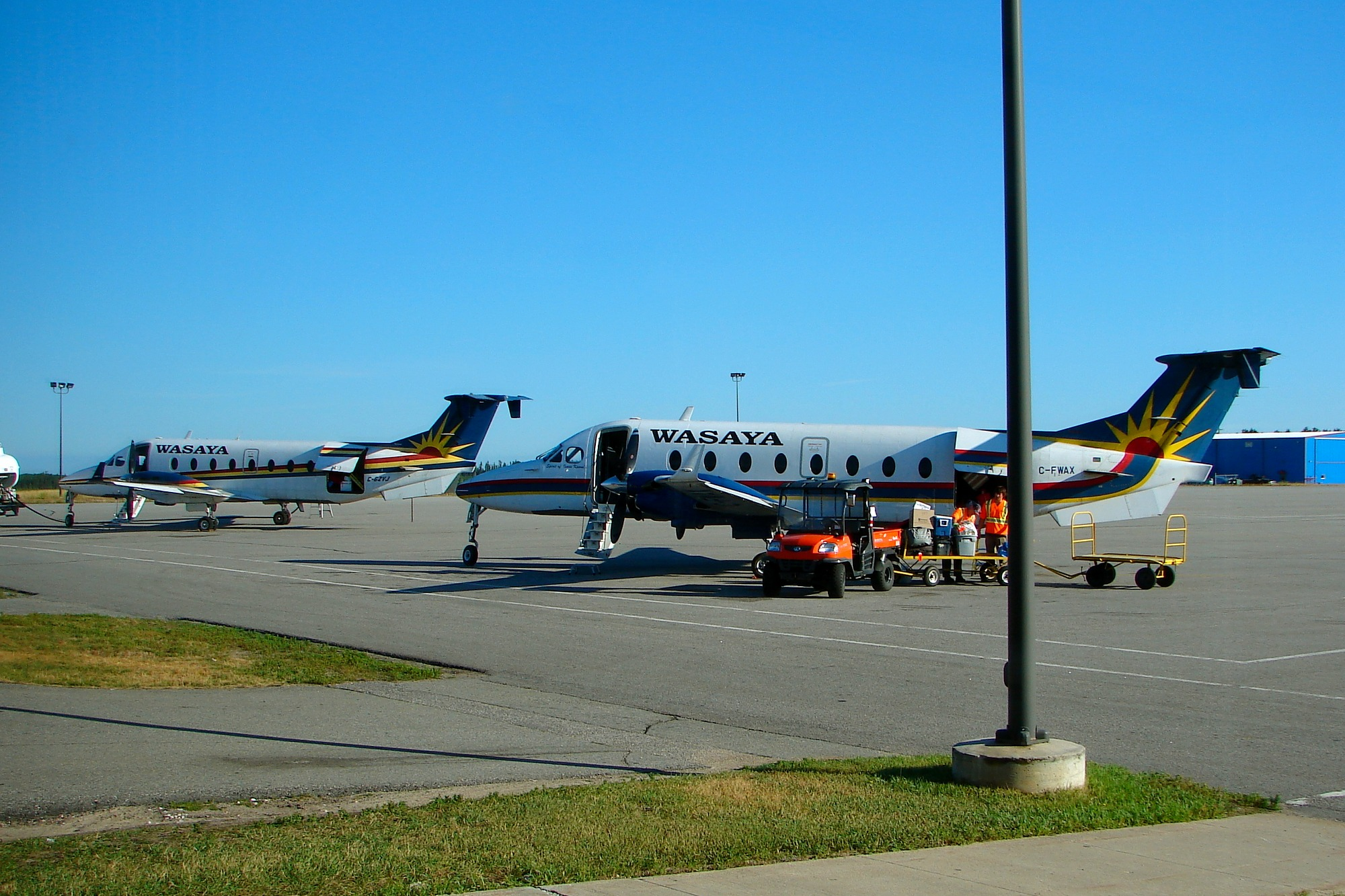
Two Beechcraft 1900Ds of Wasaya Airways at Sioux Lookout Airport

Established in 1989 as Kelner Airways, it was renamed Wasaya in 1993. The new name comes from the Oji-Cree language, which means "it is bright" in English, in reference to the brightness of the rising Sun.

Over the years, the airline has grown from a floatplane operation to a charter and scheduled passenger service airline.

Its inflight magazine Sagatay is published in conjunction with Wawatay Native Communications Society.

In October 2010, the company purchased a De Havilland Canada Dash 8 to bolster its fleet.

== Destinations ==
=== Scheduled services ===
As of 8 August 2026 Wasaya Airways serves the following destinations:

Province/territory	City	Airport	Notes
Ontario
Ontario	Bearskin Lake First Nation	Bearskin Lake Airport	Owner community
Ontario	Deer Lake First Nation	Deer Lake Airport	
Ontario	Eabametoong First Nation	Fort Hope Airport	
Ontario	Fort Severn First Nation	Fort Severn Airport	Owner community
Ontario	Kasabonika Lake First Nation	Kasabonika Airport	Owner community
Ontario	Keewaywin First Nation	Keewaywin Airport	Owner community
Ontario	Kingfisher First Nation	Kingfisher Lake Airport	Owner community
Ontario	Kitchenuhmaykoosib Inninuwug First Nation (Big Trout Lake)	Big Trout Lake Airport	Owner community
Ontario	Muskrat Dam Lake First Nation	Muskrat Dam Airport	Owner community
Ontario	Neskantaga First Nation	Lansdowne House Airport	
Ontario	Nibinamik First Nation (Summer Beaver)	Summer Beaver Airport	Owner community
Ontario	North Caribou Lake First Nation (Weagamow or Round Lake)	Round Lake (Weagamow Lake) Airport	
Ontario	North Spirit Lake First Nation	North Spirit Lake Airport	
Ontario	Pickle Lake	Pickle Lake Airport	Hub
Ontario	Pikangikum First Nation	Pikangikum Airport	Owner community
Ontario	Poplar Hill First Nation	Poplar Hill Airport	
Ontario	Red Lake	Red Lake Airport	Hub
Ontario	Sachigo Lake First Nation	Sachigo Lake Airport	
Ontario	Sandy Lake First Nation	Sandy Lake Airport	Owner community
Ontario	Sioux Lookout	Sioux Lookout Airport	Hub
Ontario	Thunder Bay	Thunder Bay Airport	Hub
Ontario	Wapekeka First Nation	Angling Lake/Wapekeka Airport	Owner community
Ontario	Webequie First Nation	Webequie Airport	
Ontario	Wunnumin Lake First Nation	Wunnumin Lake Airport	Owner community

== Fleet ==
As of August 2026, Wasaya Airways had four different aircraft types listed on their website (however individual aircraft numbers are not listed) and fourteen registered with Transport Canada.

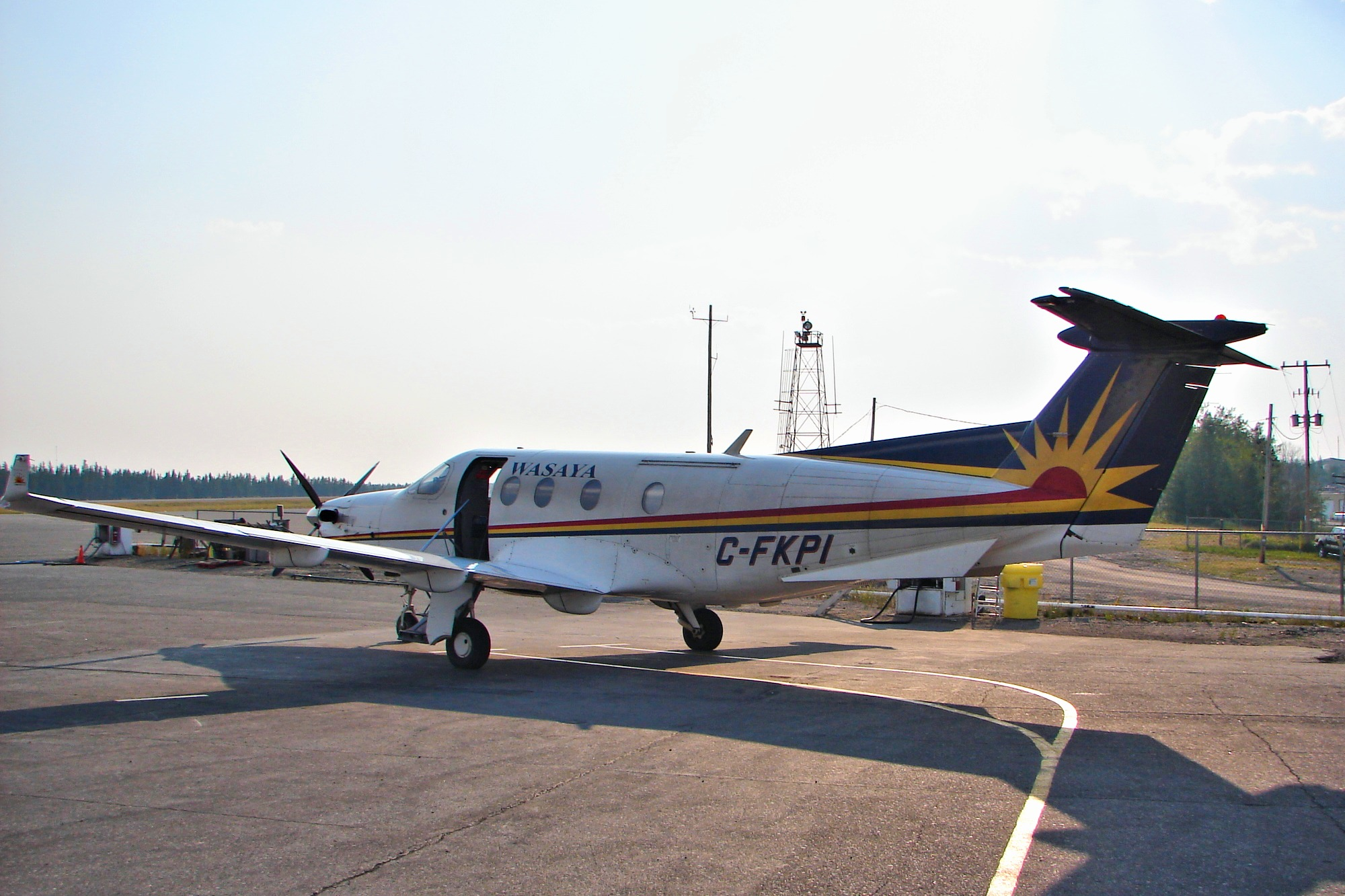
Pilatus PC-12 of Wasaya Airways at Pickle Lake Airport

Wasaya Airways fleet
Aircraft	No. of aircraft TC	Variants	Notes
ATR 42	1	ATR 42-320	Freight only up to 4,800 kg (10,500 lb). Not listed at Wasaya website.
ATR 72	2	ATR 72-212	Freight only up to 7,300 kg (16,000 lb) or fuel up to 9,200 L (2,000 imp gal; 2,400 US gal)
Beechcraft 1900	6	1900D	Seats up to 18, used for scheduled and charter service
De Havilland Canada Dash 8	2	DHC-8-102; DHC-8-314	Seats up to 37 (DHC-8-102) or 44 (DHC-8-314) for scheduled and charter service and an 3,600 kg (8,000 lb) payload
Pilatus PC-12	3	PC-12/45	Seats up to 9, used for scheduled, charters and freight services
Total	14		

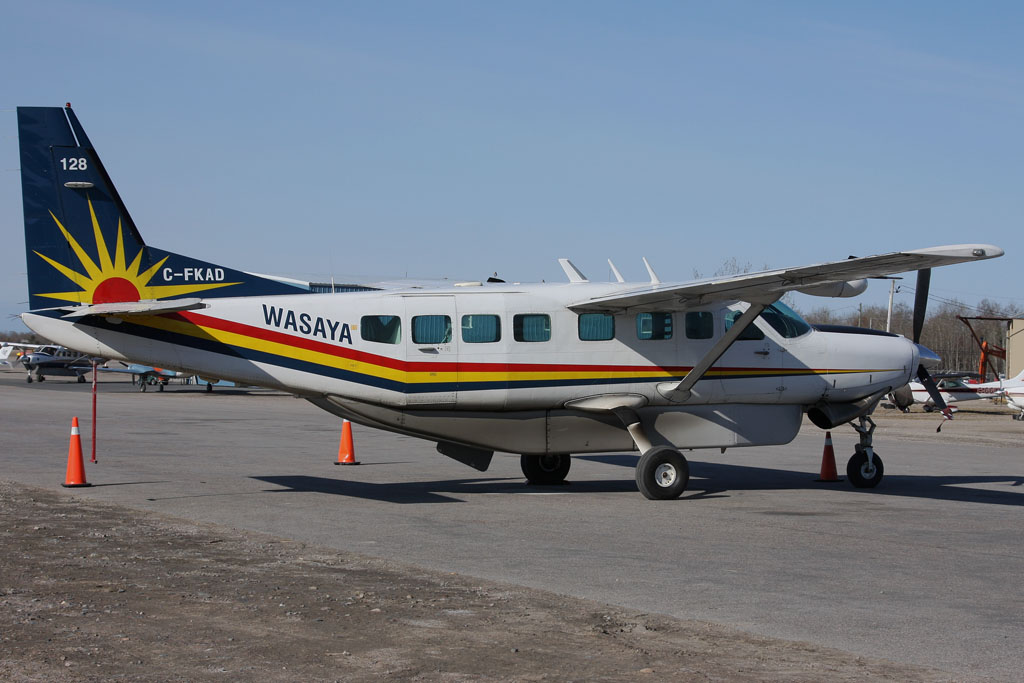
Cessna 208B C-FKAD in Red Lake

== Accidents and incidents ==
- On 11 September 2003, a Cessna 208B Grand Caravan operating as Wasaya Airways Flight 125 crashed near Summer Beaver, killing all eight persons on board. The flight originated in Pickle Lake and was scheduled to land at Summer Beaver Airport, but the airplane crashed and burned 3 nautical miles (5.6 km; 3.5 mi) northwest of the runway. The Transportation Safety Board of Canada was unable to determine the cause.
- On 12 June 2012, a Wasaya Airways Hawker Siddeley HS 748 caught fire while unloading JET A-1 jet fuel at Sandy Lake Airport in Northwestern Ontario. No injuries were reported. The aircraft burned to the ground, and only the left wing and nacelle survived.
- On 11 December 2015, Wasaya Airways Flight 127, a Cessna 208B Grand Caravan, while en route from Pickle Lake Airport to Angling Lake/Wapekeka Airport, crashed approximately 10 nautical miles (19 km; 12 mi) north northeast of Pickle Lake Airport. The pilot was the sole occupant and was killed in the crash. The probable cause for the accident was flying in known or forecast icing conditions although the aircraft was prohibited from doing that, and a high take-off weight that increased the severity of degraded performance when the flight encountered icing conditions.
