= Pickle Lake Airport =

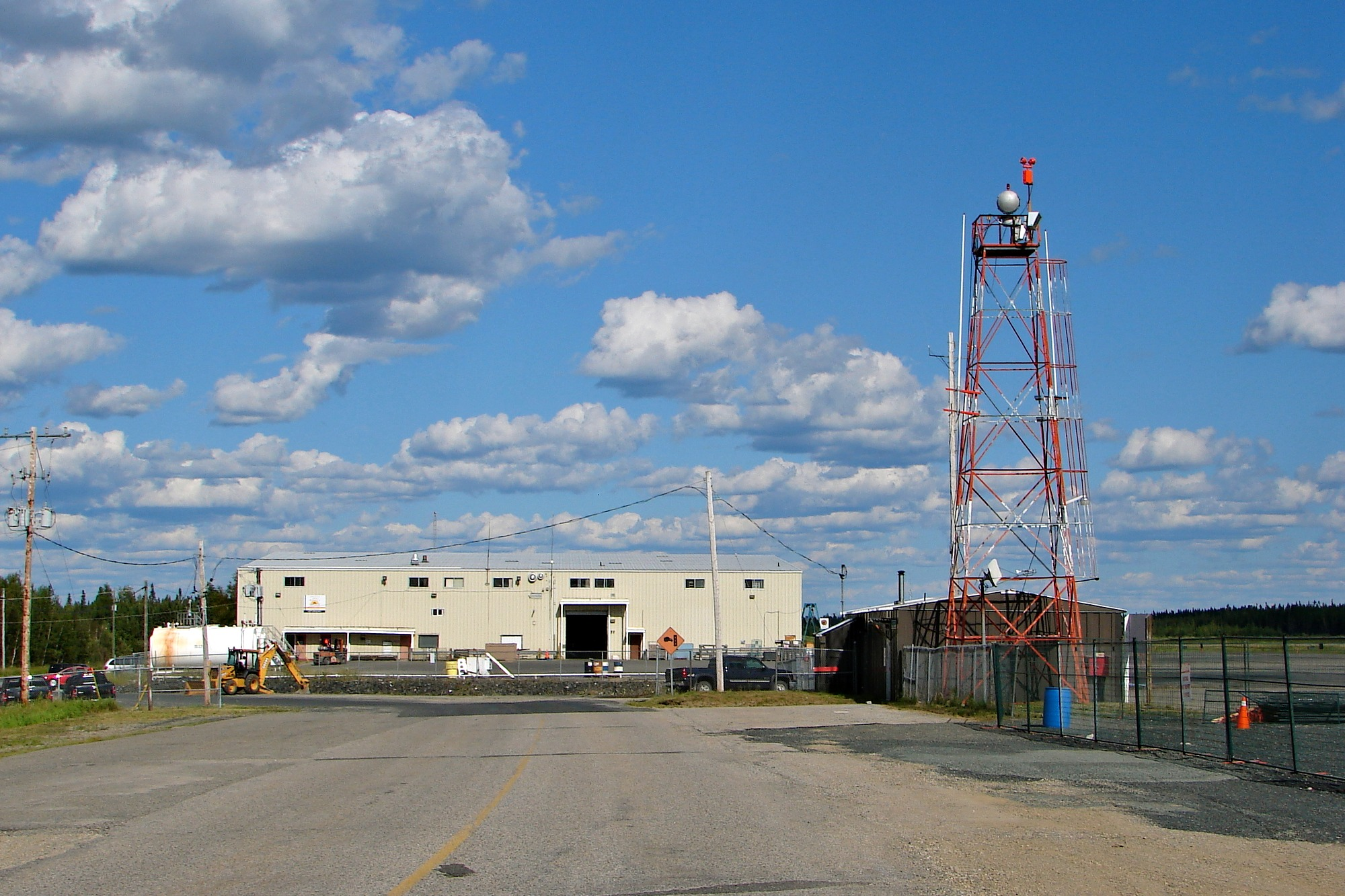
- IATA: YPL; ICAO: CYPL; WMO: 71845

Summary
- Airport type: Public
- Operator: Government of Ontario - MTO
- Location: Pickle Lake, Ontario
- Time zone: EST (UTC−05:00)
- Elevation AMSL: 1,268 ft (386 m)
- Coordinates: 51°26′47″N 090°12′49″W

Map
- Location in Ontario

Runways
Direction	Length		Surface
Direction	ft	m	Surface
09/27	5,217	1,590	Asphalt

Statistics (2010)
- Aircraft movements: 18,698
- Source: Canada Flight Supplement; Environment Canada; Movements from Statistics Canada

Pickle Lake Airport (IATA: YPL, ICAO: CYPL) is located 0.7 nautical miles (1.3 km; 0.81 mi) southwest of Pickle Lake, Ontario, Canada.

== Airlines and destinations ==
As of September 2025, Pickle Lake airport is served by the following airlines:

Airlines	Destinations
Wasaya Airways	Sioux Lookout, Bearskin Lake, Wapekeka

== Accidents and incidents ==
- On 12 May 1977, Douglas R4D-1 C-FBKV of Patricia Air Services was written off in an accident. One person was killed.
- On 11 May 1987, Douglas C-47B C-FADD of Air Manitoba crashed near Pickle Lake after a structural failure of the port wing. The aircraft was on a domestic cargo flight from Big Trout Lake Airport to Pickle Lake Airport. Both crew were killed.
- On 17 March 2017, Basler BT-67 C-FKGL of Private Air crashed on take-off for Big Trout Airport, Ontario. All three crew survived.

== See also ==
- Pickle Lake Water Aerodrome
