= XHNTV-TDT =

Television station in Tepic, Nayarit, Mexico

XHNTV-TDT XHRTNA-TDT
- XHNTV: Tepic, Nayarit XHRTNA: Acaponeta–Tecuala, Nayarit; Mexico
- Channels: Digital: XHNTV: 26 (UHF) XHRTNA: 27 (UHF); Virtual: 8,6
- Branding: 8 NTV

Programming
- Affiliations: Commercial independent Multimedios Televisión

Ownership
- Owner: Radio-Televisión Digital de Nayarit, S.A. de C.V.

History
- First air date: April 29, 2019
- Former call signs: XHNTV: XHRTTS-TDT (2017–2019)
- Call sign meaning: NTV; Radio-Televisión Digital de Nayarit

Technical information
- Licensing authority: CRT
- ERP: XHNTV: 29.892 kW; XHRTNA: 13.968 kW
- HAAT: XHRTNA: −112.4 m (−369 ft)
- Transmitter coordinates: 21°32′7.9″N 104°54′34.4″W (XHNTV); 22°26′42.2″N 105°25′16.4″W (XHRTNA)

Links
- Website: ntv.com.mx

XHNTV-TDT, virtual channel 8, is a television station in Tepic, Nayarit, Mexico. The station is owned by Radio-Televisión Digital de Nayarit, S.A. de C.V., and broadcasts as 8 NTV from the Cerro Loma Batea tower farm in Tepic.

A second station, XHRTNA-TDT (RF 27), is to be built to repeat 8 NTV programming for Acaponeta and Tecuala. It will broadcast from a tower between the two cities used by radio stations XHETD-FM and XHLH-FM.

== History ==
XHNTV-TDT (originally XHRTTS-TDT) and XHRTNA-TDT were awarded in the IFT-6 television station auction of 2017. RTDN is owned by journalist Antonio Tello, who had run the NTV online news site. The Tepic station began commercial operation April 29, 2019, with XHRTTS having been assigned new XHNTV-TDT call letters on April 26.

== Subchannels ==
In August 2019, the IFT approved the addition of Multimedios Televisión and Milenio Televisión as subchannels of XHNTV.

RF	Virtual	Video	Ratio	PSIP Name	Network
26.1	8.1	1080i	16:9	XHNTV	8 NTV
26.2	6.1	480i	16:9	XHNTV2	Multimedios Televisión
26.3	6.2	480i	16:9	XHNTV3	Milenio Televisión
