= Northern Ontario Resource Trail =

First Nations access road

Highway 808
- Northern Ontario Resource Trail; NORT Road
- A map of the Northern Ontario Resource Trail. Nungesser Road at left, Pickle Lake Road at right

Route information
- Maintained by Ministry of Transportation of Ontario
- Length: 281 km (175 mi)
- Existed: December 6, 1966–1983

Major junctions
- South end: Highway 599 in Pickle Lake
- North end: Windigo Lake

Location
- Country: Canada
- Province: Ontario
- Districts: Kenora
- Major cities: Pickle Lake

Highway system
- Ontario provincial highways; Current; Former; 400-series

The Northern Ontario Resource Trail (NORT) is the designation of two mainly gravel roads in the Canadian province of Ontario. One road travels north from Pickle Lake to the northern shore of Windigo Lake, then to the North Caribou Lake First Nation at Weagamow Lake. The second road travels north from Red Lake. Both link several winter roads and ice roads that serve communities in extreme Northern Ontario with the provincial highway system. The first 60 kilometres (37 mi) of the Pickle Lake–Windigo Lake Road, as far as the Otoskwin River, also held the tertiary highway designation of Highway 808 within the provincial highway system from 1966 to 1983.

== Route description ==
=== Pickle Lake ===
The Northern Ontario Resource Trail at Pickle Lake begins at the northern end of Highway 599 in Central Patricia and travels 236 kilometres (150 mi) to Windigo Lake. It initially meanders northeast before turning northwest. From the north shore of the lake, a non-NORT road on Crown Land continues for approximate 45 kilometres (28 mi) to serve the North Caribou Lake First Nation.

Although the road is maintained year-round, it is extremely lightly travelled, and is in a very remote section of the province. Motorists should stock up on supplies in Pickle Lake, and be prepared for remote bush travel. It is recommended to fill up on gasoline and supplies, and check weather conditions before travelling down this road, since there are no gas stations or any other services on the Northern Ontario Resource Trail north of Pickle Lake. Caution must be used while driving as well, as there are some steep grades on the route. Although the speed limit is 80 kilometres per hour (50 mph), there are many sections where such a speed cannot be maintained.

=== Red Lake ===
A gravel road known as the Nungesser Road travels from the Red Lake northwards approximately 100 kilometres (60 mi) to Bak Creek. A road on Crown land then continues from that point to the Berens River. It begins at an intersection with Highway 125 just west of Balmertown. Approximately 83 kilometres (52 mi) north of there, it intersects with Taxi Bay Road, which provides boat access to Pikangikum First Nation. Several winter roads connect to Nungesser Road, and provide access and supplies from approximately January to March each year to fly-in First Nations territories in the far north of Ontario. Due to the effects of climate change, the winter roads have been open for a shorter period each year. Consequently, several First Nations are studying the feasibility of connecting to the road network with all-season roads.

=== Communities served ===
The Northern Ontario Resource Trail serves several communities via ice/winter roads that branch from it:

- Bearskin Lake First Nation
- Kitchenuhmaykoosib Inninuwug First Nation (Big Trout Lake)
- Eabametoong First Nation (Fort Hope)
- Kasabonika Lake First Nation
- Keewaywin First Nation
- Kingfisher First Nation
- Koocheching First Nation
- Muskrat Dam Lake First Nation
- Neskantaga First Nation (Lansdowne House)
- Sachigo Lake First Nation
- Sandy Lake First Nation
- Nibinamik First Nation (Summer Beaver)
- Wapekeka First Nation
- Wawakapewin First Nation
- North Caribou Lake First Nation (Weagamow Lake)
- Webequie First Nation
- Wunnumin Lake First Nation

== History ==
=== Pickle Lake ===
The Pickle Lake Northern Ontario Resource Trail was built beginning in 1962 under the Resources Roads program, which was jointly funded by the provincial and federal government to encourage mineral exploration in the far north of Ontario. Initially known as Lingman Lake Road, construction began on 39.6 kilometres (24.6 mi) north from Central Patricia that year, and was completed in 1963. However, the road was not travelable until the following year, when timber crib and steel girder bridges were opened over the Crow River in Central Patricia and at July Falls. By early 1966, the road was passable as far as 60 kilometres (37 mi) north of Central Patricia.

On December 15, 1966, the 60-kilometre (37 mi) portion of Highway 599 from Central Patricia to the Otoskwin River was re-designated as Tertiary Road (commonly Highway) 808. This designation lasted until 1983, when it was decommissioned as an official Provincial Highway. The southernmost three km of the trail is paved, while the remaining length is gravel. The road is maintained year-round, due to its importance as a connection to natural resources sites and to ice/winter roads connecting remote First Nations communities in the Kenora District.

Beginning in December 2013, the North Caribou Lake First Nation undertook engineering and environmental studies on connecting to the provincial highway network by extending the Northern Ontario Resource Trail. Construction of a bridge over the Weagamow Lake Narrows as well as the new road south to Windigo Lake commenced in late 2016 or early 2017. With the completion of the Wa-Pik-Che-Wanoog bridge in mid-October 2017, all-season road access was extended by 45 kilometres (28 mi), although the extension is not officially part of the Pickle Lake NORT Road.

=== Red Lake ===
The Nungesser Road gets its name from the nearby Nungesser Lake, which in turn is named after a French aviator named Charles Nungesser.

== Major intersections ==
=== Pickle Lake ===
The following table lists the major junctions along the Pickle Lake Northern Ontario Resource Trail. The entire route is located in Kenora District.

Division	Location	km	mi	Destinations	Notes
Central Patricia	0.0	0.0	Highway 599 south – Pickle Lake, Ignace		
Unorganized Kenora District	58.8	36.5	Otoskwin River crossing; end of former Highway 808 designation		
Windigo Lake	237	147	Windigo Lake shoreline		
North Caribou Lake First Nation	281	175			
1.000 mi = 1.609 km; 1.000 km = 0.621 mi

=== Red Lake ===
The following table lists the major junctions along the Nungesser Road Northern Ontario Resource Trail. The entire route is located in Kenora District.

Division	Location	km	mi	Destinations	Notes
Balmertown	0	0.0	Highway 125 – Red Lake, Cochenour		
Unorganized Kenora District	83	52	Pikangikum All Season Road		
Unorganized Kenora District	97	60	Bak Creek	Bak Lake MNR Base	
1.000 mi = 1.609 km; 1.000 km = 0.621 mi
