= Muskrat Dam Airport =

- IATA: MSA; ICAO: CZMD; WMO: 71678

Summary
- Airport type: Public
- Operator: Government of Ontario
- Location: Muskrat Dam Lake First Nation
- Time zone: CST (UTC−06:00)
  - Summer (DST): CDT (UTC−05:00)
- Elevation AMSL: 911 ft (278 m)
- Coordinates: 53°26′29″N 091°45′46″W

Map
- Location in Ontario

Runways
Direction	Length		Surface
Direction	ft	m	Surface
05/23	3,508	1,069	Gravel
- Source: Canada Flight Supplement

Muskrat Dam Airport (IATA: MSA, ICAO: CZMD) is located 2 nautical miles (3.7 km; 2.3 mi) north of the First Nations community of Muskrat Dam Lake First Nation, Ontario, Canada.

The airport features one gravel runway that is 3,508 ft × 100 ft (1,069 m × 30 m). The runway is maintained Monday to Friday year-round.

== Airlines and destinations ==
Airlines	Destinations
North Star Air	Thunder Bay
Wasaya Airways	Bearskin Lake, Sioux Lookout
