= KCFS =

KCFS or kcfs may refer to:

- KCFS-LP, a low-power radio station (98.1 FM) licensed to serve El Dorado Hills, California, United States
- KGWD, a radio station (94.5 FM) licensed to serve Sioux Falls, South Dakota, United States, which held the call sign KCFS from 1985 to 2015
- One thousand cfs (cubic feet per second), a unit of fluid flow rate
