= XBE =

XBE may refer to:

- Bearskin Lake Airport, the IATA airport code
- Xbox executable, executable file format for the Xbox game console
- Xenobiotic biotransforming enzymes, enzymes used in biotransformation processes
