= Radio Católica =

Radio Católica may refer to:

- WGUA-LP, a low power FM radio station licensed to Lawrence, Massachusetts
- KLOC, an AM radio station licensed to Turlock, California
- Radio Católica (Nicaragua), a church-owned station shut down by the Sandinistas

== See also ==
- Category:Catholic radio stations
