= WLEZ =

WLEZ may refer to:

- WLEZ (FM), a radio station (99.3 FM) licensed to serve Lebanon Junction, Kentucky, United States
- WLEZ-LP, a defunct radio station (98.1 FM) formerly licensed to serve Jackson, Mississippi, United States
- WBOW, a radio station (102.7 FM) licensed to serve Terre Haute, Indiana, United States, which held the call sign WLEZ from 1992 to 2003
- WCBF (FM), a radio station (96.1 FM) licensed to serve Elmira, New York, United States, which held the call sign WLEZ from 1977 to 1992
