= QHU =

QHU may refer to:

- Qinghai University (QHU), Xining, Qinhai, China
- Qinhuai District (geocode QHU), Nanjing, Jiansu, China; see List of administrative divisions of Jiangsu
- KQHU-LP (callsign QHU in region K), Honolulu, Hawaii, USA; a radio station
- Husum Schwesing Airport (IATA airport code QHU), Husum, Germany
