= 101.0 FM =

FM radio frequency

The following radio stations broadcast on FM frequency 101.0 MHz:

== Israel ==
- Ashams Radio in the Northern District
- Radio Jerusalem in Jerusalem
