= YTL =

YTL may refer to:

- The IATA code for Big Trout Lake Airport.
- The code for New Turkish lira.
- YTL Corporation, a Malaysian firm.
- A US Navy hull classification symbol: Small harbor tug (YTL)
- Yugoslav Third League
