= XHPNX-FM =

Radio station in Pinotepa Nacional, Oaxaca, Mexico

Pinotepa Nacional, Oaxaca, Mexico; Mexico
- Frequency: 98.1 MHz
- Branding: La Ke Buena

Programming
- Format: Regional Mexican
- Affiliations: Radiópolis

Ownership
- Owner: CMI Oaxaca; (Complejo Satelital, S.A. de C.V.)

History
- First air date: June 15, 1990 (concession)
- Call sign meaning: Pinotepa Nacional OaXaca

Technical information
- ERP: 25 kW
- Transmitter coordinates: 16°20′32″N 98°03′40″W

Links
- Webcast: Listen live
- Website: encuentroradiotv.com

XHPNX-FM is a radio station on 98.1 FM in Pinotepa Nacional, Oaxaca, Mexico. It is part of CMI, the media company owned by the López Lena family, and carries its La Ke Buena Regional Mexican format from Radiópolis, as well as CMI's Encuentro news programs.

== History ==
XEPNX-AM 920 received its concession on June 15, 1990. It has always been owned by the López Lena family.

XEPNX received approval to migrate to FM in 2011.
