= XHMAXX-FM =

Radio station in San Martín Texmelucan, Puebla

- San Martín Texmelucan, Puebla; Mexico
- Frequency: 98.1 FM
- Branding: Stereo Max

Programming
- Format: Grupera

Ownership
- Owner: Cinco Radio; (Radio XHMAXX, S.A. de C.V.)

History
- First air date: June 8, 1993 (concession)
- Former call signs: XHSTX-FM (1993–1998)

Technical information
- ERP: 50 kW

Links
- Webcast: Listen live
- Website: stereomax.com.mx

XHMAXX-FM is a radio station on 98.1 FM in San Martín Texmelucan, Puebla. The station is owned by Cinco Radio and known as Stereo Max, carrying a grupera format.

== History ==
Previous logo

XHMAXX received its first concession on June 8, 1993, as XHSTX-FM, owned by Teleradio de Teziutlán, S.A. de C.V. The station was sold to Radio XHMAXX, S.A. de C.V., in 1998; the station may have signed on under the XHMAXX call sign, and it certainly did not have them by 1999 when the XHSTX call sign was reassigned in Santiago Tuxtla, Veracruz.
