= Kingfisher Lake Airport =

- IATA: KIF; ICAO: none; TC LID: CNM5

Summary
- Airport type: Public
- Operator: Government of Ontario - MTO
- Location: Kingfisher First Nation
- Time zone: CST (UTC−06:00)
  - Summer (DST): CDT (UTC−05:00)
- Elevation AMSL: 866 ft / 264 m
- Coordinates: 53°00′45″N 089°51′19″W

Map
- Location in Ontario

Runways
Direction	Length		Surface
Direction	ft	m	Surface
12/30	3,520	1,073	Gravel / clay
- Source: Canada Flight Supplement

Kingfisher Lake Airport (IATA: KIF, TC LID: CNM5) is located 1.5 nautical miles (2.8 km; 1.7 mi) southwest of the First Nations community of Kingfisher First Nation, Ontario, Canada.

== Airlines and destinations ==
Kingfisher Lake Airport has 2 short haul flights:

Airlines	Destinations
Wasaya Airways	Sioux Lookout, Wunnumin Lake
