= Wapekeka 2 =

- Indian reserve
- Wapekeka Indian Reserve No. 2
- Location within Ontario
- Coordinates: 53°50′N 89°34′W
- Country: Canada
- Province: Ontario
- District: Kenora
- First Nation: Wapekeka

Area
  - Land: 25.12 km^{2} (9.70 sq mi)

Population (2016)
  - Total: 440
  - Density: 17.5/km^{2} (45/sq mi)
- Website: www.wapekeka.ca

Wapekeka 2 is an Anisininew First Nation reserve in Kenora District, and is one of the reserves of the Wapekeka First Nation.
