= Big Trout Lake Airport =

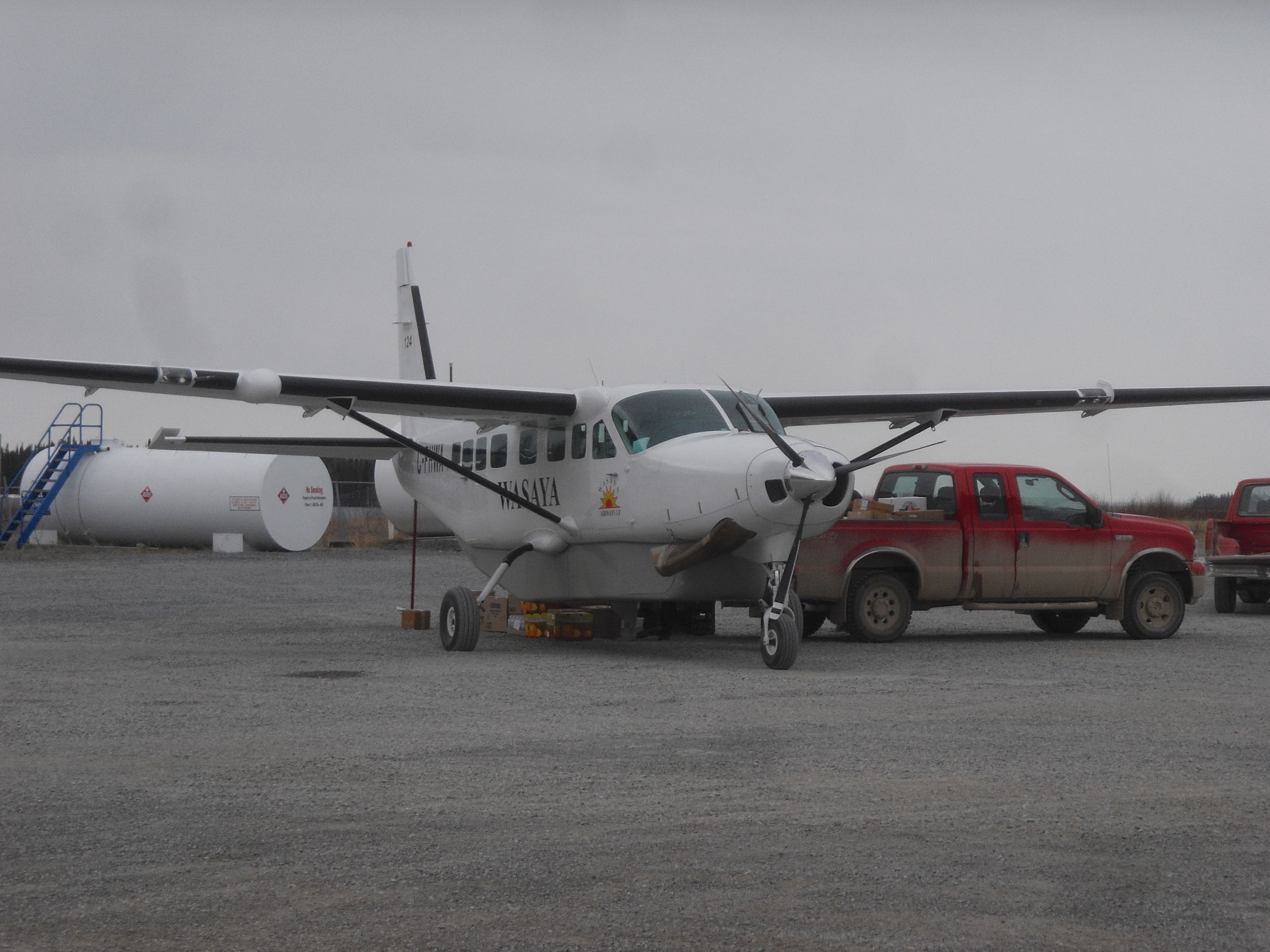
- IATA: YTL; ICAO: CYTL

Summary
- Airport type: Public
- Operator: Government of Ontario
- Location: Kitchenuhmaykoosib Inninuwug First Nation
- Time zone: CST (UTC−06:00)
  - Summer (DST): CDT (UTC−05:00)
- Elevation AMSL: 730 ft / 223 m
- Coordinates: 53°49′04″N 089°53′49″W

Map
- Location in Ontario

Runways
Direction	Length		Surface
Direction	ft	m	Surface
14/32	3,906	1,191	Gravel
- Source: Canada Flight Supplement

Big Trout Lake Airport (IATA: YTL, ICAO: CYTL) is located 0.6 nautical miles (1.1 km; 0.69 mi) southwest of Kitchenuhmaykoosib Inninuwug (formerly known as Big Trout Lake), Ontario, Canada.

There is a terminal building at the airport and surrounded by pre-fabricated steel structures. Manual air stairs and baggage carts are used to serve aircraft.

== Airlines and destinations ==
Airlines	Destinations
North Star Air	Bearskin Lake, Sioux Lookout, Wapekeka
Wasaya Airways	Fort Severn, Kasabonika, Sioux Lookout, Wapekeka
