= XHPCPG-FM =

Imagen Radio station in Chilpancingo, Guerrero, Mexico

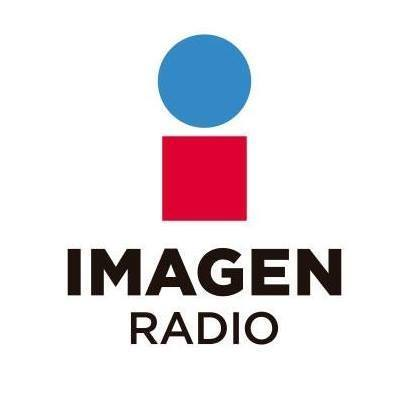
- Chilpancingo, Guerrero; Mexico
- Frequency: 98.1 FM
- Branding: Imagen Radio

Programming
- Format: News/talk

Ownership
- Owner: Grupo Imagen; (Imagen Radio Comercial, S.A. de C.V.)

History
- First air date: 2019
- Call sign meaning: "Chilpancingo"

Technical information
- Class: B1
- ERP: 20,000 watts
- HAAT: 362.6 m
- Transmitter coordinates: 18°32′38.75″N 88°16′15.08″W

XHPCPG-FM is a radio station on 98.1 FM in Chilpancingo, Guerrero. It is an owned-and-operated station of Grupo Imagen's Imagen Radio network.

== History ==
XHPCPG was awarded in the IFT-4 radio auction of 2017 as one of two Chilpancingo frequencies in the auction. Grupo Imagen paid 2 million pesos. The station signed on in early 2019.
