= XHPZAM-FM =

Radio station in Zamora-Jacona, Michoacán, Mexico

- Zamora, Michoacán; Mexico
- Frequency: 98.1 FM
- Branding: Exa FM

Programming
- Format: Pop
- Affiliations: MVS Radio

Ownership
- Owner: Ilox Telecomunicaciones; (TV Rey de Occidente, S.A. de C.V.)

History
- First air date: November 28, 2017
- Call sign meaning: ZAMora

Technical information
- Class: A
- ERP: 3 kW
- HAAT: -99.17 m
- Transmitter coordinates: 19°56′53.17″N 102°17′40.44″W

Links
- Webcast: Listen live
- Website: exafmzamora.mx

XHPZAM-FM is a radio station on 98.1 FM in Zamora, Michoacán, Mexico, with transmitter in adjoining Jacona. It carries the Exa FM pop format from MVS Radio.

== History ==
XHPZAM was awarded in the IFT-4 radio auction of 2017 to TV Rey de Occidente, a cable company in Zamora now trading as Ilox Telecomunicaciones. The station went on air November 28 of that year.
