= Wapusk Trail =

Winter road in Canada

The Wapusk Trail is a winter road that starts in Gillam, Manitoba, where Manitoba Provincial Road 280, between Thompson, Manitoba and Gillam, Manitoba, ends. At 752 kilometres (467 mi) in length, the trail is the longest seasonal road in the entire world. The Wapusk Trail is rebuilt every year out of snow, from Gillam, Manitoba, eastward first, to Shamattawa, Manitoba, then to Fort Severn, Ontario. It then curves slightly south, but still east, through Polar Bear Provincial Park, along Hudson Bay, to Peawanuck, Ontario, about 30 kilometres inland.

For most people in Fort Severn, or Peawanuck, this is their only means of transport, other than by plane. "Wapusk" is Cree for "White Bear", and there are many polar bears around. The communities of Shamattawa, Manitoba, and Fort Severn and Peawanuck, Ontario, on the Wapusk Trail are mostly Cree.
