= Wunnumin Lake Airport =

- IATA: WNN; ICAO: none; TC LID: CKL3

Summary
- Airport type: Public
- Operator: Government of Ontario - MOT
- Location: Wunnumin Lake First Nation
- Time zone: CST (UTC−06:00)
  - Summer (DST): CDT (UTC−05:00)
- Elevation AMSL: 819 ft / 250 m
- Coordinates: 52°53′38″N 089°17′21″W

Map
- Location in Ontario

Runways
Direction	Length		Surface
Direction	ft	m	Surface
16/34	3,511	1,070	Gravel
- Source: Canada Flight Supplement

Wunnumin Lake Airport (IATA: WNN, TC LID: CKL3) is located 2 nautical miles (3.7 km; 2.3 mi) south of the First Nations community of Wunnumin Lake First Nation, Ontario, Canada.

== Airlines and destinations ==
Airlines	Destinations
Wasaya Airways	Kingfisher Lake

== Accidents and incidents ==
11 April 1977, Douglas C-47B C-FXXT of Superior Airways was damaged beyond economic repair in an aborted take-off.
