= Wapekeka 1 =

- Indian reserve
- Wapekeka Indian Reserve No. 1
- Location within Ontario
- Coordinates: 53°44′N 89°32′W
- Country: Canada
- Province: Ontario
- District: Kenora
- First Nation: Wapekeka

Area
  - Land: 36.05 km^{2} (13.92 sq mi)

Wapekeka 1 is a First Nations reserve in Kenora District, Ontario. It is one of the reserves of the Wapekeka First Nation.

== 2025 courtroom shooting ==
In July 2025, a police officer shot and killed a man who was allegedly carrying a weapon in a courtroom in Wapekeka.
