= KUDO =

KUDO may refer to:

- KUDO-LP, a low-power radio station (102.1 FM) licensed to serve Harrison, Arkansas, United States
- KOAN (AM), a radio station (1080 AM) licensed to serve Anchorage, Alaska, United States, which held the call sign KUDO from 2002 to 2013
- KVGK, a radio station (93.1 FM) licensed to serve Las Vegas, Nevada, United States, which held the call sign KUDO from 1980 to 1987
