= Windigo Lake (Ontario) =

Lake in Kenora District, Ontario, Canada

- Location within Ontario
- Location: Ontario
- Coordinates: 52.59°N 91.512°W
- Basin countries: Canada
- Surface elevation: 323 m (1,060 ft)

Windigo Lake is a lake in the Kenora District in Northern Ontario, Canada. It is situated at the end of the Northern Ontario Resource Trail.

== See also ==
- List of lakes in Ontario
