= Nibinamik First Nation =

Summer Beaver ᓃᐱᓇᒥᐦᐠ
- Indian settlement
- Summer Beaver Indian Settlement
- Location within Ontario
- Coordinates: 52°45′N 88°30′W
- Country: Canada
- Province: Ontario
- District: Kenora
- First Nation: Nibinamik

Area
  - Land: 15.53 km^{2} (6.00 sq mi)

Population (2016)
  - Total: 382
  - Density: 24.6/km^{2} (64/sq mi)
- Website: nibinamik.ca

Nibinamik First Nation (Ojibway language: ᓃᐱᓇᒥᐦᐠ (Niibinamik, "Summerbeaver"); unpointed: ᓂᐱᓇᒥᐠ), also known as Summer Beaver Band, is a small Anisininew First Nation reserve in Northern Ontario, located on the Summer Beaver Settlement that is connected to the rest of the province by its airport, and a winter/ice road that leads to the Northern Ontario Resource Trail.

Nibinamik First Nation is a member of the Matawa First Nations, a regional Chiefs council, and Nishnawbe Aski Nation, a Tribal Political Organization representing the majority of First Nations in Northern Ontario.

Summer Beaver was policed by the Nishnawbe-Aski Police Service, an Aboriginal-based service, until its detachment was condemned and closed down.

== History ==
Summer Beaver began as an intentional community in 1975 when a group of Anglican people, related by kinship, decided to leave Lansdowne House, a Catholic settlement. Violence had reached epic proportions in Lansdowne House in the 1970s and the community was divided along religious lines. The Summer Beaver people felt that they could make a better life for themselves and their children back at Nibinamik Lake. The Canadian government was wary of this move, and offered nothing in the way of support for quite some time. Nibinamik was not recognized as a reserve until recently.

In 2017, the provincial government of Ontario pledged support for the construction of a road that would connect Nibinamik, Webequie and the Northern Ontario Ring of Fire to Ontario Highway 599 at Pickle Lake.
