= KIRA-LP =

Currently silent
- Omaha, Nebraska; United States
- Frequency: 91.9 MHz

Programming
- Format: Variety

Ownership
- Owner: Independent Omaha Radio Project, Inc.

History
- First air date: 2017
- Former call signs: KIOR-LP (2017–2026)
- Former frequencies: 98.1 MHz (2017–2026)
- Call sign meaning: Independent Radio Arts

Technical information
- Licensing authority: FCC
- Facility ID: 196774
- Class: L1
- ERP: 12 watts
- HAAT: 82.61 meters (271.0 ft)
- Transmitter coordinates: 41°17′13″N 96°0′14.9″W

Links
- Public license information: LMS
- Website: www.kirafm.live

KIRA-LP (91.9 FM) is a low power radio station broadcasting a variety format. The station is operated by the Independent Omaha Radio Project, Inc. The station serves eastern Omaha and western Council Bluffs.
