= WQAQ =

- Hamden, Connecticut; United States
- Frequency: 98.1 MHz

Programming
- Format: Variety

Ownership
- Owner: Quinnipiac University

History
- First air date: 1973; 53 years ago

Technical information
- Licensing authority: FCC
- Facility ID: 54311
- Class: D
- ERP: 18 watts
- HAAT: -24.0 meters
- Transmitter coordinates: 41°25′10.6″N 72°54′22.6″W

Links
- Public license information: Public file; LMS
- Website: wqaq.com

WQAQ (98.1 FM) is a student-run, non-commercial educational radio station broadcasting a variety format. Licensed in Hamden, Connecticut, the station serves the local Hamden/Wallingford area. WQAQ is owned by Quinnipiac University.

== Format ==
WQAQ has a variety format. Any student, faculty, staff, or alumni of the Quinnipiac University may join the radio station and have their own radio show. The station's requirements are minimal, allowing DJs to play music and content of their choice. Shows last for one hour each, and the show schedule changes each semester. An up-to-date schedule is available on the station's website.

== Antenna Controversy ==
On August 19, 2006, before the beginning of the Fall semester, WQAQ's broadcast antenna was deemed an "eyesore" by the administration of Quinnipiac University. Without notifying the students involved in the organization, the tower was removed from the top of the student center. The tower's sudden removal put WQAQ's licensing with the FCC in jeopardy, and forced the station to shift its broadcast to online streaming. During the summer of 2007, the WQAQ tower was rebuilt off-site, and the station resumed normal on-air broadcasting that school year.
