= KLEF =

Coordinates: 61.188°N 149.885°W

Anchorage, Alaska; United States
- Frequency: 98.1 MHz
- Branding: KLEF Classical 98

Programming
- Format: Classical music

Ownership
- Owner: Chinook Concert Broadcasters

History
- First air date: September 16, 1988
- Call sign meaning: Treble clef

Technical information
- Licensing authority: FCC
- Facility ID: 10839
- Class: C1
- ERP: 25,000 watts
- HAAT: 9 meters (30 ft)

Links
- Public license information: Public file; LMS
- Website: klef98.com

KLEF (98.1 FM) is a commercial radio station in Anchorage, Alaska. It is owned by Chinook Concert Broadcasters with studios on East 65th Avenue. It is one of the last classical music radio stations in the U.S. supported by advertising, not donations. It sounds out its call letters as "Clef," referring to a treble clef found on sheet music.

KLEF is a Class C1 station. It has an effective radiated power (ERP) of 25,000 watts. The transmitter tower is atop the Frontier Building on A Street at 36th Avenue in Anchorage.

== History ==
=== Station construction ===
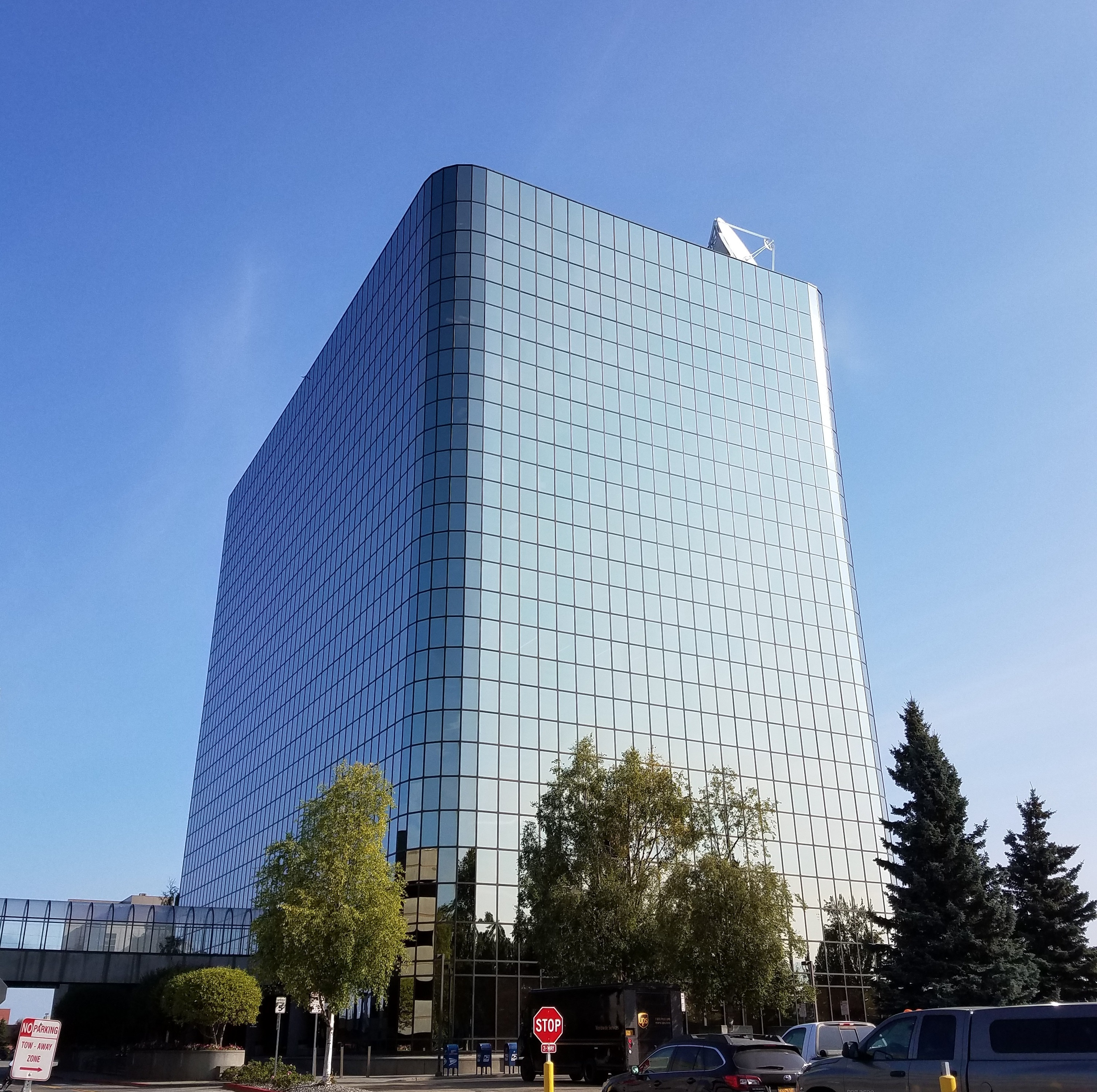
KLEF's transmitter is atop the Frontier Building in Anchorage

Northern Way Broadcasting wanted to build a new radio station in Anchorage. It was granted a construction permit for 98.1 MHz on December 15, 1986, after settling with two other applicants for the frequency. However, before construction, Northern Way sold the permit in 1987 to Chinook Concert Broadcasters. Chinook Concert was owned by Rick Goodfellow along with seven California families and one in Sitka, Alaska. The station was consulted by Ed Davis, one of the founders and owners of one-time classical station KDFC in San Francisco. Davis, intrigued by the idea of a classical music station in Alaska, contributed technical expertise and also recruited most of the investors.

KLEF signed on the air on September 16, 1988. Beethoven's Symphony No. 9 and Variations on the Alaska Flag Song by local composer Paul Rosenthal were the first selections played.

=== Call letters ===
The launch of a new commercial classical music station was unusual in an era when classical stations in other cities were falling by the wayside or switching to non-commercial, listener-supported operations. The KLEF call letters were illustrative of this. They had last been used at two such stations: 94.5 FM in Houston, which had been KLEF from 1964 to 1986 before being sold, and 92.1 FM in nearby Seabrook, Texas, which used the designation when it picked up the format only to decide on new call letters upon a sale a year later.

The new Alaska station was also a success with listeners, denting the ratings of public radio station 91.1 KSKA. By 1994, KLEF was tied for eighth in total audience in a 20-station market, but it was second in the affluent 35–64 demographic.

Former logo

=== 1080 AM ===
In 1998, Chinook Concert Broadcasters acquired KASH, an AM station spun off as a result of commercial station consolidation. It primarily broadcast business talk shows and the BBC World Service. The AM station under this format was not successful. It changed to a progressive talk format under the call sign KUDO but also failed to attract an audience. It was sold in 2005 to a local of the International Brotherhood of Electrical Workers. It has since changed hands again and airs conservative talk programs.

In 2008, Goodfellow attributed KLEF's success to the unavailability of satellite radio – which serves many classical music listeners in the Lower 48 but cannot be received in Alaska. Anchorage also lacks an easy listening station, making classical music attractive to those unserved listeners. On KLEF's 25th anniversary in 2013, Goodfellow calculated that there were 55 commercial classical stations in the United States when the station signed on in 1988 but just three a quarter-century later: KLEF in Anchorage, WFMT in Chicago, and WRR in Dallas. WRR has since switched to a non-commercial, listener-supported operation.
