= CJTL-FM =

Canadian First Nations/Christian radio station

Coordinates: 51°28′14″N 90°10′11″W

CJTL
- Pickle Lake, Ontario; Canada
- Frequency: 96.5 MHz

History
- Call sign meaning: Christ Jesus The Light

Technical information
- Translator: 98.1 MHz

Links
- Website: nefc.ca/radio/

CJTL-FM is a Canadian radio station that broadcasts First Nations and Christian radio programming at 96.5 FM in Pickle Lake, Ontario, along with a radio translator CJTL-FM-1 at 98.1 FM in Thunder Bay.

Licensed in 2008, the station is owned by the Native Evangelical Fellowship of Canada and broadcasts as the Wah-Ste-Win Aboriginal Radio Network (WARN), which broadcasts Christian programming for First Nations in Northwestern Ontario. WARN has plans to open a third transmitter in Winnipeg, pending CRTC approval and licensing.
