= Fort Severn Airport =

- IATA: YER; ICAO: CYER; WMO: 71099

Summary
- Airport type: Public
- Operator: Government of Ontario - MTO
- Location: Fort Severn First Nation
- Time zone: EST (UTC−05:00)
  - Summer (DST): EDT (UTC−04:00)
- Elevation AMSL: 51 ft / 16 m
- Coordinates: 56°01′08″N 087°40′34″W

Map
- Location in Ontario

Runways
Direction	Length		Surface
Direction	ft	m	Surface
15/33	3,519	1,073	Gravel
- Sources: Canada Flight Supplement; Environment Canada

Fort Severn Airport (IATA: YER, ICAO: CYER) is located 3 nautical miles (5.6 km; 3.5 mi) northwest of Fort Severn First Nation, Ontario, Canada.

== Airlines and destinations ==
As of September 2025, the Fort Severn airport is served by the following airlines:

Airlines	Destinations
Wasaya Airways	Sioux Lookout

== Accidents and incidents ==
- On 25 September 1975, Douglas C-47A CF-AII of Ilford-Riverton Airways crashed short of the runway, killing all three people on board. The aircraft was operating a non-scheduled passenger flight.
