= Summer Beaver Airport =

- IATA: SUR; ICAO: none; TC LID: CJV7

Summary
- Airport type: Public
- Operator: Government of Ontario
- Location: Nibinamik First Nation
- Time zone: EST (UTC−05:00)
  - Summer (DST): EDT (UTC−04:00)
- Elevation AMSL: 833 ft (254 m)
- Coordinates: 52°42′31″N 088°32′31″W

Map
- Location in Ontario

Runways
Direction	Length		Surface
Direction	ft	m	Surface
17/35	3,509	1,070	Gravel
- Source: Canada Flight Supplement

Summer Beaver Airport (IATA: SUR, TC LID: CJV7) is located 2.5 nautical miles (4.6 km; 2.9 mi) southwest of the First Nations community of Nibinamik (Summer Beaver), Ontario, Canada.

== Facilities and runway characteristics ==
Summer Beaver Airport features a single gravel runway measuring 3,509 ft × 100 ft (1,070 m × 30 m) in width, oriented on a heading of 173°/353° magnetic. The aerodrome has an elevation of 833 ft (254 m) above sea level. The airport is equipped with runway threshold identification lights and end lights, medium-intensity runway edge lights, and Type K ARCAL (aircraft radio control of aerodrome lighting). The airport operates on an aerodrome traffic frequency (ATF) of 123.2 MHz, with coverage available within 5 NM (9.3 km; 5.8 mi) below 3,800 ft (1,200 m) above sea level.

The airport does not have an on-site weather reporting station or fire fighting services .

== Ownership and operations ==
Summer Beaver Airport is owned and operated by the Government of Ontario. The airport is one of 29 provincial government-owned airports in rural and northern Ontario. Scheduled and charter air services are provided by Wasaya Airways, a regional airline operating from a base in Thunder Bay, Ontario. The airport is designated as part of Canada's essential air access network for remote communities.

== Airlines and destinations ==
Airlines	Destinations
Wasaya Airways	Fort Hope/Eabametoong, Webequie
