= WUDR =

- Dayton, Ohio; United States
- Frequency: 98.1 MHz
- Branding: UD Flyer Radio

Programming
- Format: College Radio

Ownership
- Owner: University of Dayton

History
- First air date: 1970

Technical information
- Licensing authority: FCC
- Facility ID: 69423
- Class: D
- ERP: 13 watts
- HAAT: 27.3 meters
- Transmitter coordinates: 39.787°N 84.240°W

Links
- Public license information: Public file; LMS
- Webcast: Listen Live
- Website: WUDR website

WUDR (98.1/99.5 FM) is a non-commercial, college radio station located on the campus of the University of Dayton in Dayton, Ohio.

== Translators ==
In addition to the main station, WUDR is relayed by an additional translator to widen its broadcast area.

Call sign	Frequency	City of license	FID	ERP (W)	Class	FCC info
W258AI	99.5 FM	Dayton, Ohio	69422	80	D	LMS
