= WXNZ-LP =

- Skowhegan, Maine; United States
- Frequency: 90.7 MHz
- Branding: HooSkow Radio

Programming
- Format: Community radio

Ownership
- Owner: Wesserunsett Arts Council

Technical information
- Licensing authority: FCC
- Facility ID: 194437
- Class: LP1
- ERP: 2 watts
- HAAT: 198 metres (650 ft)
- Transmitter coordinates: 44°42′49.9″N 69°43′36.7″W

Links
- Public license information: LMS
- Webcast: Listen live
- Website: Official Website

WXNZ-LP (90.7 FM, "HooSkow Radio") was a radio station licensed to serve the community of Skowhegan, Maine. The station is owned by the Wesserunsett Arts Council and airs a community radio format.

The station was assigned the WXNZ-LP call letters by the Federal Communications Commission on June 24, 2014. On January 2, 2025, the station returned their license for cancellation, so that replacement full power station WXNZ 90.7 FM could be licensed.
