= WEVT-LP =

- Enosburg Falls, Vermont; United States
- Broadcast area: Franklin County, Vermont
- Frequency: 98.1 MHz

Programming
- Format: Oldies

Ownership
- Owner: Spavin Cure Historical Group

History
- First air date: November 15, 2004

Technical information
- Licensing authority: FCC
- Facility ID: 135390
- Class: L1
- ERP: 100 watts
- HAAT: 13.2 meters (43 ft)
- Transmitter coordinates: 44°54′39.00″N 72°48′13.00″W

Links
- Public license information: LMS
- Website: WEVT-LP website

WEVT-LP (98.1 FM) is a radio station licensed to Enosburg Falls, Vermont, United States. The station is owned by Spavin Cure Historical Group. WEVT-LP is one of the oldest Low Power FM Stations in Vermont, with broadcasting starting on November 15, 2004.

The station was started as part of the project to renovate the Spavin Cure Building in Enosburg Falls, Vermont. This building was the manufacturing site of Kendall's Spavin Cure, a patent medicine made at the turn of the century. The renovation has been put on hold for the present.

The station was off the air for a number of years after vandals damaged the station and took key equipment. Broadcasting resumed April, 2011.

The current programming format for WEVT-LP consists of classic 1950s and 1960s oldies. The station has put together a fairly good library of music, including many doo-opp hits of the 1950s. At night, the programming switches to classic and modern rock. On Sunday mornings and holidays WEVT-LP presents "American Popular Standards" featuring selections from the Big Band era and the Great American Songbook. Currently, WEVT-LP is the only station in Vermont offering an oldies or standards format.

WEVT-LP can be heard in the town of Enosburgh and several surrounding towns, including Sheldon, Franklin, Berkshire, Richford, Montgomery, Bakersfield and Fairfield. WEVT-LP can also be heard on its website.
