= CFMQ-FM =

Canadian radio station

- Hudson Bay, Saskatchewan; Canada
- Frequency: 98.1 MHz

Programming
- Format: Community radio

Ownership
- Owner: HB Communications Inc.

History
- First air date: October 1994

Technical information
- Licensing authority: CRTC
- ERP: 38 watts
- HAAT: 28.1 metres (92 ft)
- Transmitter coordinates: 52°51′24″N 102°23′18″W

CFMQ-FM is a Canadian radio station that broadcasts a community radio format at 98.1 FM in Hudson Bay, Saskatchewan. CFMQ is owned by HB Communications Inc.

The station received approval on August 15, 1994 and began broadcasting in October the same year.
