= Wapekeka First Nation =

Human settlement in Ontario, Canada

Coordinates: 53°43′16″N 89°32′20″W

Wapekeka First Nation (Severn Ojibwa: ᐗᐱᑭᑲ, formerly known as Angling Lake First Nation) is a First Nation band government in the Canadian province of Ontario. An Oji-Cree community in the Kenora District, the community is located approximately 450 kilometres northeast of Sioux Lookout. In January 2008, the total registered population was 375, of which the on-reserve population was 355.

The First Nation have as its reserve the 3605 ha Wapekeka 1 Indian Reserve and the 2026.5 ha Wapekeka 2 Indian Reserve, and two Addendums in 1996 and 1997. The First Nation observes Central Standard Time (UTC-6) in winter and Central Daylight Time (UTC-5) in the summer.

== Transportation ==
The settlement is not accessible by road from other parts of Ontario, but local roads exists within Angling Lake and to the nearby airport. Regular air service is provided by Wasaya Airways at Angling Lake/Wapekeka Airport.

== Essential Services ==
Wapekeka was policed by the Nishnawbe-Aski Police Service, an Aboriginal-based service until 2012. As of 2013, the Ontario Provincial Police (OPP) has been policing the territory from their detachment in Sioux Lookout. Fire services are provided by five trained residents.

== Media ==
Wawaytay Radio System is a local FM radio station, TV Ontario provides local educational program via cable services.

== Education ==
Reverend Eleazar Winter Memorial School is the only school on the reserve and opened in 1990. The school offers classes from JK to Grade 8 only and students going onto secondary studies must leave the community. The school burned down in a fire in 2015 and re-opened in a temporary structure in early 2016. In October of 2024, the community opened a newly-built school, closer to the airport, and changed the name to the Reverend Eleazar Winter Education Centre. Plans are underway to extend instruction to Grade 9 by September 2025. Approximately 130 students were enrolled in Grades K-8 in the Spring of 2025.

== Religion ==
Wapekeka has one church, St Paul's Anglican Church.

== Health Services ==
A health clinic provides basic health services to the community. More advanced care requires patients to be flown out to either to Sioux Lookout or Thunder Bay for more advance care.

== Economy ==
Basic goods can be bought from either the community store or convenience store.

A local hostel can be used for visitors staying over in Wapekeka.

== History ==
The Wapekeka reserves are within the boundaries of the territory described by James brown the 1929-30 Adhesion to Treaty 9 (James Bay Treaty of 1905). In 1947, beginnings of Angling Lake community was formed as a satellite community used in winter by families from Big Trout Lake whose traplines were located in the area. Beginning in 1960, permanent communities apart from the Big Trout Lake Band were established. These communities were Kingfisher Lake, Wunnumin Lake, Bearskin Lake, Kasabonika, Muskrat Dam, Sachigo Lake and Wapekeka. Wapekeka received official Band status and two reserves in 1979. On August 28, 1981, the Angling Lake Band officially changed its name to Wapekeka First Nation.

== Governance ==
The current chief is Chief Brennan Sainnawap, Deputy Chief Ananias Winter, Councillor Georgina Winter, Councillor Russel Brown, Councillor Henry Roundsky. Chief Sainnawap succeeded Norman Brown, who served for 21 years and died in 2014 as Deputy Chief.

Originally a member of the Kayahn Area Tribal Council (1977–1983), when the council disbanded, along with the communities of Kasabonika Lake, Kingfisher Lake, Wunnumin Lake and Wawakapewin, Wapekeka formed and today is part of the Shibogama First Nations Council.

== 2025 courtroom shooting ==
In July 2025, a police officer shot and killed a man who was allegedly carrying a weapon in a courtroom in Wapekeka.
