= XHLH-FM =

Radio station in Acaponeta, Nayarit

- Acaponeta, Nayarit; Mexico
- Frequency: 98.1 FM
- Branding: La Patrona

Programming
- Format: Regional Mexican

Ownership
- Owner: Alica Medios; (Comunicación Integral de Nayarit, S.A. de C.V.)
- Sister stations: XHETD-FM

History
- First air date: August 15, 1967 (concession)

Technical information
- Licensing authority: CRT
- Class: B1
- ERP: 25 kW
- HAAT: 90.11 m (295.6 ft)
- Transmitter coordinates: 22°26′35″N 105°25′20″W

Links
- Webcast: radiohosting.online/..
- Website: acaponeta.lapatrona.fm

XHLH-FM is a radio station on 98.1 FM in Acaponeta, Nayarit. The station is owned by Alica Medios, the media arm of Grupo Empresarial Alica, and carries a Regional Mexican format known as La Patrona.

== History ==
XHLH began as XELH-AM 1400 (later moved to 670), with a concession awarded to Pedro Aguilar Villegas on August 15, 1967. Aguilar Villegas sold XELH and XETD-AM in Tecuala to Alica Medios in the early 2000s.

The station received its authorization to migrate to FM as XHLH-FM on 98.1 in 2011.
