= Fort Severn First Nation =

Fort Severn 89 ᐗᔕᐦᐅ ᐃᓂᓂᐗᐠ
- Indian reserve
- Fort Severn Indian Reserve No. 89

Western Swampy Cree transcription(s)
  - Canadian Aboriginal Syllabics: Waśaho Ininiwak
- Location within Ontario
- Coordinates: 55°59′33″N 87°38′06″W
- Country: Canada
- Province: Ontario
- District: Kenora
- First Nation: Fort Severn

Government
  - Type: Band council
  - Chief: Matthew Kakekaspan

Area
  - Land: 44.07 km^{2} (17.02 sq mi)

Population (2016)
  - Total: 361
  - Density: 8.2/km^{2} (21/sq mi)
- Website: fortsevern.firstnation.ca

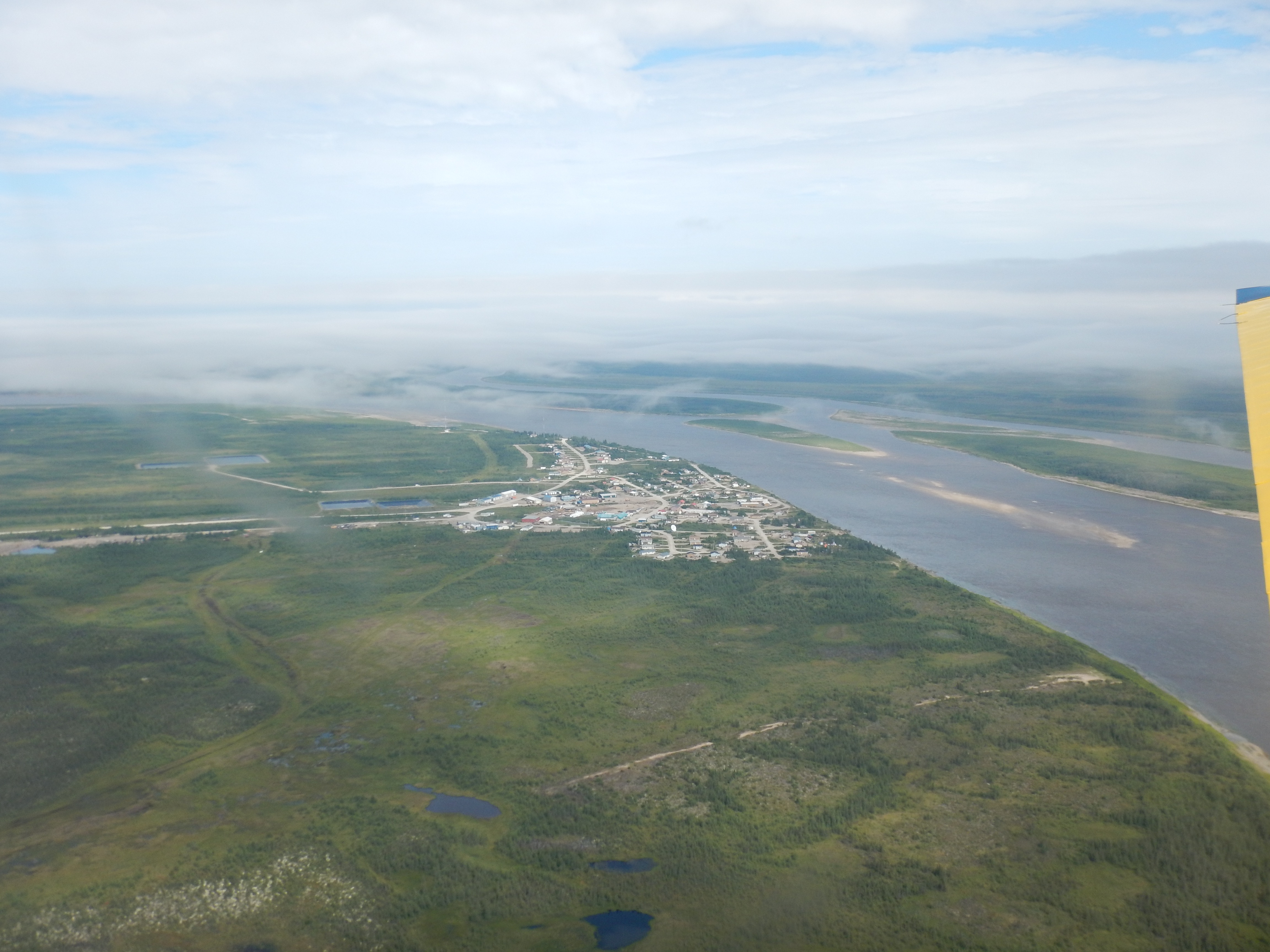
Aerial view of Fort Severn, Summer 2015

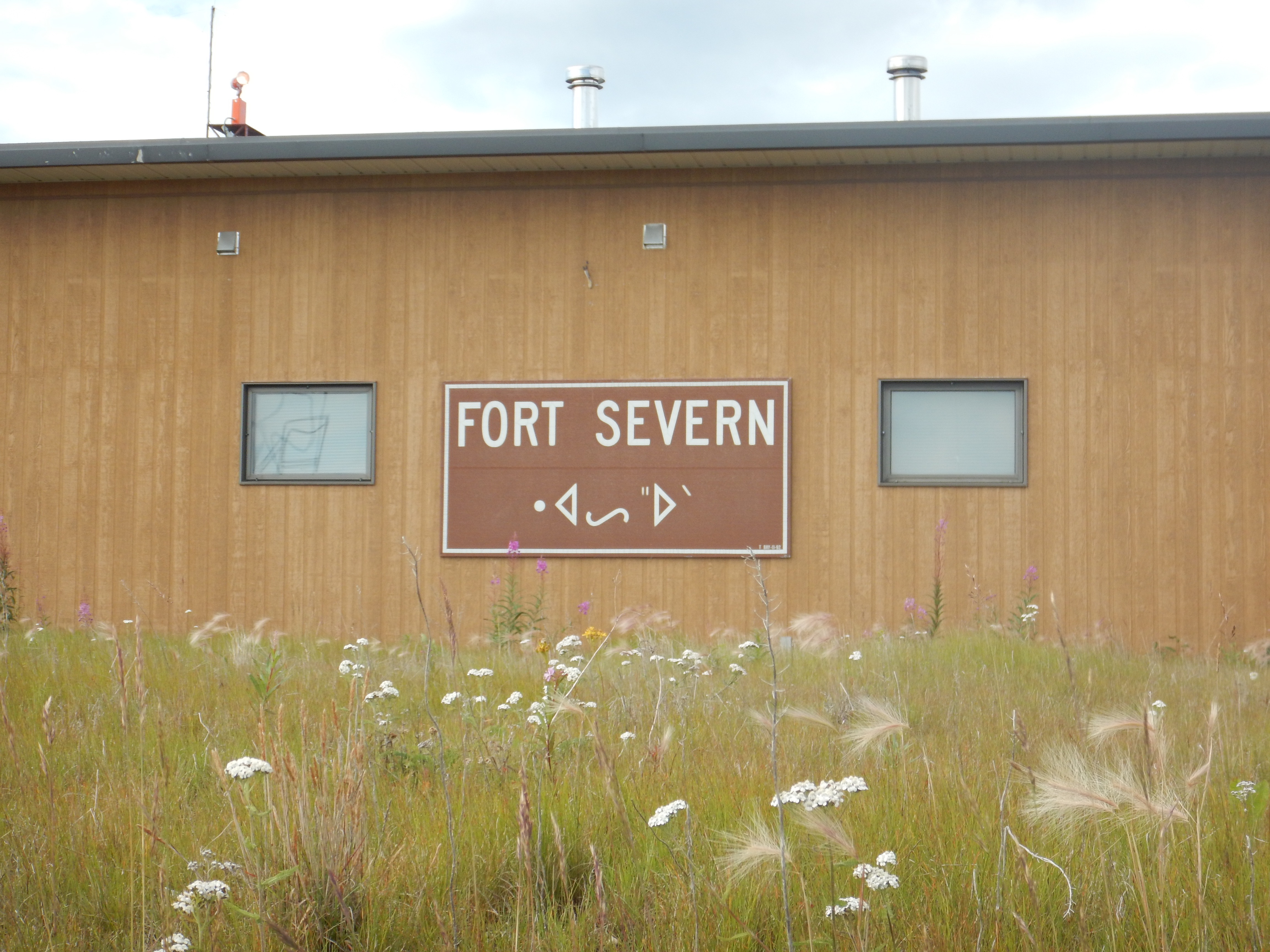
Sign at Fort Severn Airport in English (Fort Severn) and Cree (ᐗᔕᐦᐅᐠ [Waśahohk]). Summer 2015

Fort Severn First Nation (Swampy Cree: ᐗᔕᐦᐅ ᐃᓂᓂᐗᐠ, romanized: Waśaho Ininiwak) is a Western Swampy Cree First Nation band government located on the Severn River near Hudson Bay. It is the northernmost community in Ontario, Canada. In 2001, the population was 401, consisting of 90 families in an area of 40 square kilometres. The legal name of the reserve is Fort Severn 89, with the main settlement of Fort Severn (Swampy Cree: ᐗᔕᐦᐅᐠ, romanized: Waśahohk; Severn Ojibwa: ᐙᔕᐦᐅᐤ, romanized: wâšahow).

The town is linked by a winter/ice road called the Wapusk Trail during the winter to Peawanuck, Ontario, in the east, and Shamattawa and Gillam, Manitoba, to the west.

Fort Severn is policed by the Nishnawbe-Aski Police Service, an Indigenous-based service.

== History ==
This area was inhabited for thousands of years by varying cultures of indigenous peoples. At the time of European contact, the historic Swampy Cree, an Algonquian-speaking people, lived in the area.

In 1689 the Hudson's Bay Company built Fort Severn at this site, originally naming it Fort James; it was one of the earliest English fur trading posts in the New World. After years of international competition between the English and French, with their wars playing out in North America, the French attacked the outpost and pillaged it in 1782 when they were allies of the Thirteen Colonies during the American Revolutionary War.

In the early 20th century, when the federal government negotiated a treaty with the First Nations, it set aside land for a native reserve in the Rocksand area at the confluence of the Severn and Sachigo Rivers, with the consent of the leaders at the time. In 1973, the reserve was relocated to the mouth of the Severn River on Hudson Bay, for more direct access to shipping. The reserve achieved full status on January 11, 1980.

== Government ==
The local band council consists of an elected chief, a deputy chief, and four band councillors.

== Community services ==
There is no hospital in Fort Severn, with medical needs provided either at the local nursing station or via Keewaytinook Okimakanak Telemedicine (KOTM) link. The Community Doctor (Christopher Arthur Giles) travels in every month to do regular check-ups, follow-ups, and schedule appointments and surgeries. Specialists such as optometrists, dentists, and hygienists travel to Fort Severn every two to three months.

== Transportation ==
There are only local roads in town and residents travel by car, snowmobile, four-wheelers, or walking.

The Fort Severn Airport is located a short distance from the settlement and is reached by an access road.

== Education ==
Wasaho Cree Nation School is the full functioning school providing primary education needs. It was built in 2016, preparing students for 21st century learning. Keewaytinook Internet High School is housed in a small building and provides distance learning for residents needing secondary education.

== Climate ==
Fort Severn has a subarctic climate (Dfc) and is one of the coldest communities in Ontario. Summers typically have cool to mild weather with short heatwaves, while winters are severely cold and long, lasting from October to sometimes through May.

Climate data for Fort Severn
Month	Jan	Feb	Mar	Apr	May	Jun	Jul	Aug	Sep	Oct	Nov	Dec	Year
Record high °F (°C)	33.3 (0.7)	33.1 (0.6)	51.4 (10.8)	61.7 (16.5)	81.5 (27.5)	94.5 (34.7)	95.2 (35.1)	90.7 (32.6)	85.3 (29.6)	77.7 (25.4)	53.2 (11.8)	36.7 (2.6)	95.2 (35.1)
Mean daily maximum °F (°C)	−1.1 (−18.4)	0.9 (−17.3)	14.8 (−9.6)	27.7 (−2.4)	42.2 (5.7)	56.9 (13.8)	65.2 (18.4)	64.4 (18.0)	54.5 (12.5)	41.3 (5.2)	22.2 (−5.4)	5.4 (−14.8)	32.9 (0.5)
Daily mean °F (°C)	−9.7 (−23.2)	−9 (−23)	3 (−16)	17.9 (−7.8)	33.9 (1.1)	46.3 (7.9)	54.4 (12.4)	54.7 (12.6)	46.3 (7.9)	35.7 (2.1)	15.8 (−9.0)	−1.5 (−18.6)	24.0 (−4.5)
Mean daily minimum °F (°C)	−18.2 (−27.9)	−18.9 (−28.3)	−8.8 (−22.7)	8 (−13)	25.6 (−3.6)	35.6 (2.0)	43.6 (6.4)	45 (7)	38.1 (3.4)	30 (−1)	9.4 (−12.6)	−8.3 (−22.4)	15.1 (−9.4)
Record low °F (°C)	−46.7 (−43.7)	−50.6 (−45.9)	−39.1 (−39.5)	−22.5 (−30.3)	−2.4 (−19.1)	24.3 (−4.3)	31.3 (−0.4)	31.1 (−0.5)	23.4 (−4.8)	7.7 (−13.5)	−27.4 (−33.0)	−49.5 (−45.3)	−50.6 (−45.9)

== In popular culture ==
Fort James, a British settlement controlled by a governor who reports to the king and who represents Hudson Bay Company, is the principal setting of the 2016 television series, Frontier. As Ann Foster describes for ScreenerTV, "'Frontier' is set in the coastal settlement of Fort James: A snowy, treacherous pocket of land that would, in a century’s time, become part of Canada."

A town by the name of Fort Severn is featured in several episodes of the 1996 anime series After War Gundam X.

Johnny Cash mentions Fort Severn in the last line of the song "Girl in Saskatoon" (alternate version), written by Cash and Johnny Horton while they travelled through Canada in 1960.
