= XHETD-FM =

Radio station in Tecuala, Nayarit, Mexico

XHETD-FM / XETD-AM
- Tecuala, Nayarit; Mexico
- Broadcast area: Escuinapa, Sinaloa
- Frequency: 92.5 FM / 570 AM
- Branding: La Patrona

Programming
- Format: Regional Mexican
- Affiliations: Multimedios Radio

Ownership
- Owner: Alica Medios; (Comunicación Integral de Nayarit, S.A. de C.V.)
- Sister stations: XHLH-FM (Acaponeta)

History
- First air date: December 20, 1954 (concession)
- Former frequencies: 1450 kHz

Technical information
- Licensing authority: CRT
- Class: B1 (FM); B (AM)
- Power: 5,000 watts day/1,000 watts night
- ERP: 25 kW
- HAAT: 37.7 m (124 ft)
- Transmitter coordinates: 22°26′35″N 105°25′20″W

Links
- Webcast: Listen live
- Website: lapatrona.fm

XHETD-FM/XETD-AM is a radio station on 92.5 FM and 570 AM in Tecuala, Nayarit. The station is owned by Alica Medios, the media arm of Grupo Empresarial Alica, and carries a Regional Mexican format known as La Patrona. Programming is originally aimed in Escuinapa, Sinaloa, which is located to the northwest of Tecuala and on the edge of the FM signal contour.

== History ==
Logo as Tuba Stereo, used from 2019 to 2022

XHETD began broadcast as XETD-AM 1450, with a concession awarded to José Manuel Navarrete Saavedra on December 20, 1954. By the 1980s, it was owned by Pedro Aguiar Villegas, who in turn sold the station to Alica in the early 2000s. In 2008, XETD was relocated from 1450 kHz to 570, allowing it to increase power from 250 watts to 5,000.

The station received authorization to migrate to FM as XHETD-FM 92.5 in 2011, but it was required to maintain its AM station, as communities could lose radio service were the AM station to go off the air.

After a previous stint as La Patrona, XHETD changed names to Tuba Stereo in late 2019. In February 2022, it once again took on the La Patrona moniker, with a new studio and programming originally licensed for Escuinapa, Sinaloa.
