= WGUA-LP =

- Lawrence, Massachusetts; United States
- Broadcast area: Merrimack Valley
- Frequency: 98.1 MHz
- Branding: Radio Católica

Programming
- Language: Spanish
- Format: Catholic radio

Ownership
- Owner: St. Patrick Parish Lawrence Educational Radio Association

History
- First air date: May 14, 2016; 9 years ago

Technical information
- Licensing authority: FCC
- Facility ID: 196055
- Class: L1
- ERP: 6 watts
- HAAT: 119 meters (390 ft)
- Transmitter coordinates: 42°39′14″N 71°13′00″W

Links
- Public license information: LMS
- Webcast: Listen live (via TuneIn)
- Website: www.wgua981.org

WGUA-LP (98.1 FM), known as Radio Católica, is a low power FM radio station broadcasting a Spanish-language Catholic radio format. Established in 2016, WGUA-LP is licensed to Lawrence, Massachusetts, broadcasting from WCRB's tower in nearby Andover. Its studios are located in Methuen.

Radio Católica is owned by the St. Patrick Parish Lawrence Educational Radio Association.
