= Ashams Radio =

Arabic-language radio station in Nazareth, Israel

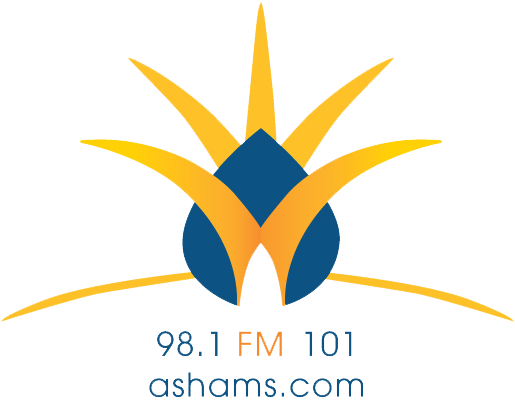
- Nazareth; Israel
- Frequencies: 98.1 and 101 MHz

Programming
- Language: Arabic
- Format: News/talk

Ownership
- Owner: Karam Group

Technical information
- Licensing authority: Second Authority for Television and Radio

Links
- Webcast: Live Streaming
- Website: ashams.com

Ashams Radio (Arabic: إذاعة الشمس), also known as Radio Al-Shams, is an independent Arabic-language radio station headquartered in Nazareth. It launched on 25 July 2003, and continues broadcasting to this day on 98.1 and 101 FM, as well as through digital platforms.

The station is owned by the Karam Group and operates an independent news system broadcasting 18 news bulletins daily. Its staff includes more than 100 journalists, correspondents, and media professionals across various fields. The broadcast schedule features talk shows, entertainment, economics, and sports programs.

== Milestones ==
In 2007, the station secured a permanent seat on the Israeli Press Council. Until 2020, it was the only independent radio station under Arab ownership serving Palestinian citizens of Israel. In 2023, its audience share exceeded 61% according to the official report of the Israeli Broadcasting Authority.

In 2014, Adalah Legal Center, in cooperation with the Mada al-Carmel media center, petitioned the Israeli Supreme Court against a decision by the Second Authority for Television and Radio to suspend Ashams Radio's broadcast during Yom Kippur. The petition argued that imposing a broadcast blackout violated the rights of both the station's owners and its listeners, and amounted to forcing Jewish religious holidays upon Arab society — a measure inconsistent with the law. The court issued an interim injunction permitting the station to continue broadcasting during Yom Kippur that year, while reserving judgment on the broader legal question.

In 2015, the Israel Democracy Institute published a book titled Ashams Radio: At the Intersection of Regulation, Politics, and Economics, which examines the station's exceptional position within the Israeli media landscape, analyzing its content, editorial policy, and relationship with the state.

== Staff and broadcasters ==
The staff of Radio Ashams includes a group of media professionals and broadcasters specializing in news, talk shows, and sports. Jacky Khoury has been managing the news department since 2009, while Mustafa Shalata has been presenting his morning programs since the station's launch in 2003.

Other prominent staff members include Zahra Saeed, Aseel Farhat, and Adham Habibullah as news anchors; Yasmin Ghamid and Aseel Kabha in editing and presenting; as well as Nabil Salameh, Duraid Liddawi, and Laila Qaish in specialized programs. The station is led by Suhel Karram as General Manager, and Badie Karram as Chief Executive Officer, a lawyer who holds an MBA from INSEAD.

== Key programs ==
Asham's Radio broadcasts daily and weekly programs covering news, analysis, social affairs, culture, and sports. Key programs include:

Program	Specialty	Broadcast Times
Awwal Khabar (First News)	Morning news	Sun–Thu, 7:00–9:00
Yawm Jadid (New Day)	News analysis	Mon–Thu, 9:00–11:00
Bayt al-Ayleh (Family Home)	Family & social	Sun–Thu, 11:00–13:00
Al-Mustashar (The Advisor)	Rights & public services	Mon & Wed, 16:00–17:00
Al-Hasad (The Harvest)	Evening news	Sun–Thu, 17:00–18:00
Al-Shams fi Usbu' (Shams of the Week)	Weekly news magazine	Fri, 8:00–9:00
I'mal Hisabak (Do the Math)	Economics	Fri, 13:00–14:00
Tawlat al-Jum'a (Friday Table)	Analytical talk	Fri, 14:00–15:00
Fi al-Marma (In the Goal)	Sports	Mon, 18:00–19:00
Kitab fi al-Shams (Book in the Sun)	Literature & culture	Tue, 19:00–20:00
Iyyadat al-Shams (Shams Clinic)	Health	Sat, 13:00–14:00
