= KCFS-LP =

- El Dorado Hills, California; United States
- Frequency: 97.3 MHz

Programming
- Format: Variety

Ownership
- Owner: Camelon Foundation

History
- First air date: February 6, 2017

Technical information
- Licensing authority: FCC
- Facility ID: 196905
- Class: L1
- ERP: 70 watts
- HAAT: 129 meters (423.228 feet)
- Transmitter coordinates: 38°41′48.10″N 121°02′21.20″W

Links
- Public license information: LMS

KCFS-LP is a low-power radio station licensed by the Camelon Foundation that broadcasts a variety format from El Dorado Hills, California. The station began broadcasting on February 6, 2017.
