= WLEZ-LP =

WLEZ-FM
Jackson, Mississippi; United States
- Broadcast area: Jackson, Mississippi
- Frequency: 98.1 MHz
- Branding: EZ 98.1

Programming
- Format: Community/Adult Standards/oldies

Ownership
- Owner: Voice of the Community Radio

Technical information
- Licensing authority: FCC
- Facility ID: 126684
- Class: L1
- ERP: 49 watts
- HAAT: 43 meters
- Transmitter coordinates: 32°17′47″N 90°12′23″W

Links
- Public license information: Public file; LMS

WLEZ-LP (98.1 MHz FM, "EZ 98.1"), was a low-powered community radio station that served the Jackson, Mississippi area from 2008 to 2019. WLEZ originally went on the air at 103.7 FM in 2008 but later that year moved to 100.1 FM. In 2013 the station moved to its final position at 98.1.

In August 2019 station ownership shut down the station, citing "programming, financial, staffing and other operational issues" in a filing with the Federal Communications Commission. They subsequently relinquished the station's license in December 2019. As of 2024, the station now serves the Lebanon Junction, Kentucky area.

== Programming ==
The station's music format included adult standards, jazz, beautiful music instrumentals, and easy listening during the day and oldies/classic hits overnight. The station also produced and broadcast diverse local programming ranging from talk shows to performances by regional artists.

In 2009, WLEZ began carrying New York Giants football in a commercial-free agreement with the Giants' main network. The Giants broadcasts included every pre-season and regular season game during the 2009–10 season, though only for terrestrial listeners. In addition, the station broadcast football games of the Brandon High School "Bulldogs" over the air and on its internet feed from 2010 - 2019.
