= Angling Lake/Wapekeka Airport =

- IATA: YAX; ICAO: none; TC LID: CKB6

Summary
- Airport type: Public
- Operator: Government of Ontario
- Location: Wapekeka First Nation
- Time zone: CST (UTC−06:00)
  - Summer (DST): CDT (UTC−05:00)
- Elevation AMSL: 713 ft / 217 m
- Coordinates: 53°50′57″N 089°34′46″W

Map
- Location in Ontario

Runways
Direction	Length		Surface
Direction	ft	m	Surface
12/30	3,609	1,100	Gravel
- Source: Canada Flight Supplement

Angling Lake/Wapekeka Airport (IATA: YAX, TC LID: CKB6) is located 1.5 nautical miles (2.8 km; 1.7 mi) west of the First Nations settlement of Wapekeka, Ontario, Canada, to the east of Big Trout Lake and on the south shores of Weir Lake.

The airport is operated by the Government of Ontario, and consists of a gravel runway with published instrument approaches. A gravel road connects to nearby community of Angling Lake.

== Airlines and destinations ==
Airlines	Destinations
North Star Air	Sioux Lookout
Wasaya Airways	Sioux Lookout
