= KQHU-LP =

KQHU
Honolulu, Hawaii; United States
- Frequency: 98.1 MHz
- Branding: 98.1 KQHU

Programming
- Format: Chinese programming

Ownership
- Owner: New Dynasty Cultural Center

History
- First air date: March 1, 2017
- Call sign meaning: Oahu

Technical information
- Licensing authority: FCC
- Class: D
- ERP: 49 watts
- Transmitter coordinates: 21.2902°N 157.8400°W

Links
- Public license information: Public file; LMS

KQHU-LP, (98.1 FM), is a new non-commercial FM outlet serving the urban portion of the Honolulu, Hawaii area, which signed on in March 2017 with Chinese-language programming. The station is owned by New Dynasty Cultural Center and is licensed to Honolulu.
