= Bearskin Lake Airport =

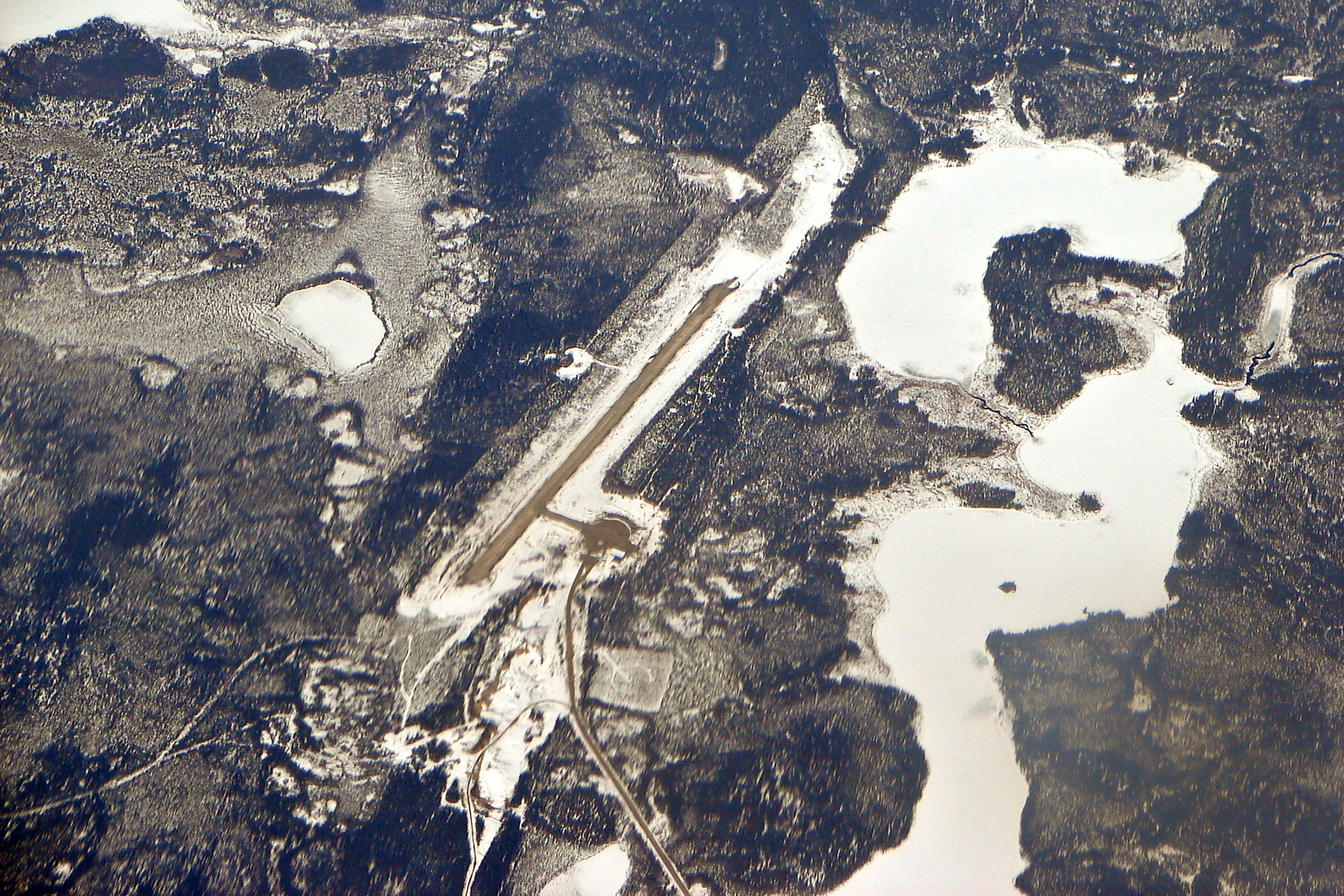
- IATA: XBE; ICAO: none; TC LID: CNE3

Summary
- Airport type: Public
- Operator: Government of Ontario
- Location: Bearskin Lake, Ontario
- Time zone: CST (UTC−06:00)
  - Summer (DST): CDT (UTC−05:00)
- Elevation AMSL: 800 ft / 244 m
- Coordinates: 53°57′56″N 091°01′38″W

Map
- Location in Ontario

Runways
| Direction | Length | | Surface |
| Direction | ft | m | Surface |
|---|---|---|---|
| 07/25 | 3,503 | 1,068 | Gravel |
- Source: Canada Flight Supplement

Bearskin Lake Airport (IATA: XBE, TC LID: CNE3) is located 3 nautical miles (5.6 km; 3.5 mi) northwest of Bearskin Lake, Ontario, Canada.

== Airlines and destinations ==
The following table gives the airlines and its destination pertaining to this airport

| Airlines | Destinations |
|---|---|
| Bearskin Airlines | Sioux Lookout |
| North Star Air | Sioux Lookout |
| Perimeter Aviation | Sioux Lookout |
| Wasaya Airways | Big Trout Lake |
