= Pickle Lake =

- Township (single-tier)
- Township of Pickle Lake
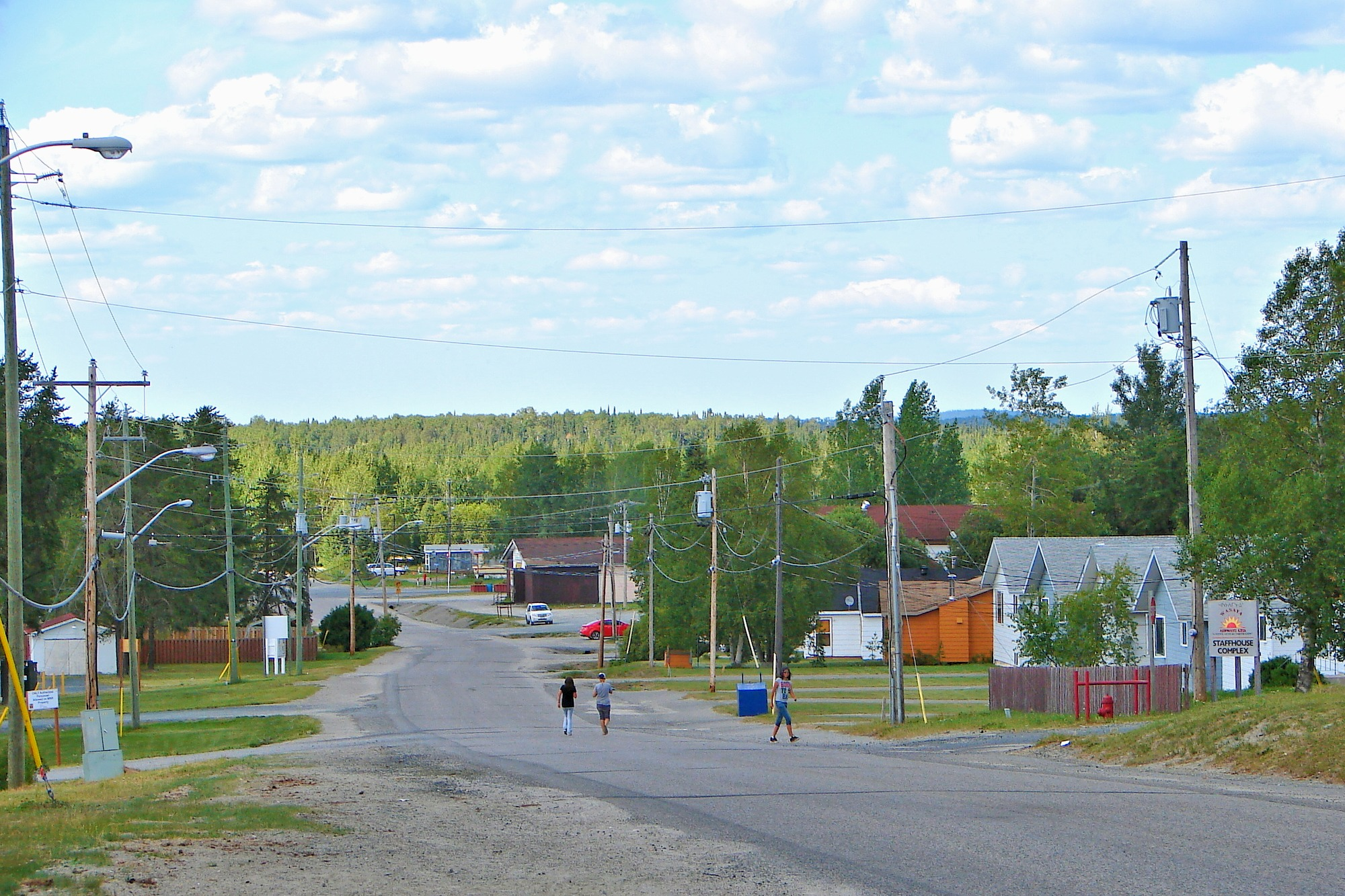

- Location within Ontario
- Coordinates: 51°28′N 90°11′W
- Country: Canada
- Province: Ontario
- District: Kenora
- Settled: 1929
- Incorporated: December 1980

Government
  - Mayor: James Dalzell
  - MP: Eric Melillo (Kenora—Kiiwetinoong)
  - MPP: Sol Mamakwa (Kiiwetinoong)

Area
  - Land: 247.21 km^{2} (95.45 sq mi)
- Elevation: 386.2 m (1,267 ft)

Population (2021)
  - Total: 398
  - Density: 1.6/km^{2} (4.1/sq mi)
- Time zone: UTC-5 (EST (geographically in Central Time Zone, but observes Eastern Time year round))
- Postal Code: P0V 3A0
- Area code: 807
- Website: picklelake.ca

Pickle Lake is a township in the Canadian province of Ontario, and is the most northerly community in the province that has year-round access by road. Located 530 kilometres (330 mi) north of Thunder Bay, highway access is via Highway 599, the only access road to the town from the south. More northerly communities rely on winter roads for access and are cut off to land travel in the summer. Highway 599 meets the Northern Ontario Resource Trail, formerly Tertiary Highway 808, at Pickle Lake.

The Township of Pickle Lake has a population of 425 and its main industries are transportation (by air and land) and tourism. Pickle Lake Airport serves as the supply point to northern First Nations. It is an access point for animal watching, with many opportunities to view moose, woodland caribou, timber wolf, black bear, game birds, bald eagles, song birds, and migratory birds such as ducks and geese. It is also a popular fishing and hunting destination. The town is sometimes referred to as the gateway to Ontario's "Last Frontier" because of its remote location. Pickle Lake has its own detachment of the Ontario Provincial Police.

The community is located on the north-east shore of Pickle Lake, from which it takes its name.

== History ==
Pickle Lake was founded as a local transportation centre for mining activities after gold was discovered nearby in 1928. From that time until 1995, more than 2.5 million ounces of gold were produced in the area. Copper was also mined near Pickle Lake in the 1970s. Exploration for gold and copper in the Pickle Lake area continues to this day.

Jack Hammell's Pickle Crow Gold Mines (1935–1961) produced 1,446,214 ounces of gold. Alex and Murdoch Mosher's Central Patricia Mine (1927–1951) produced 621,806 ounces.

Pickle Lake was incorporated as a township in 1980. It got its name from the shape of the lake which resembles a cucumber or pickle.

The township also includes the former townsites of Central Patricia and Pickle Crow. Both formerly independent settlements, Central Patricia now consists only of a few buildings located at the terminus of Highway 599 within the township, while Pickle Crow is a ghost town. After the Pickle Crow gold mine was shut down in 1966, the Ministry of Natural Resources set fire to the site as part of its program to clean up abandoned mines.

== Demographics ==
In the 2021 Census of Population conducted by Statistics Canada, Pickle Lake had a population of 398 living in 155 of its 221 total private dwellings, a change of 2.6% from its 2016 population of 388. With a land area of 247.21 km^{2} (95.45 sq mi), it had a population density of 1.6/km^{2} (4.2/sq mi) in 2021.

Canada census – Pickle Lake community profile

	2021	2016	2011
Population	398 (+2.6% from 2016)	388 (−8.7% from 2011)	425 (−11.3% from 2006)
Land area	247.21 km^{2} (95.45 sq mi)	252.18 km^{2} (97.37 sq mi)	255.08 km^{2} (98.49 sq mi)
Population density	1.6/km^{2} (4.1/sq mi)	1.5/km^{2} (3.9/sq mi)	1.7/km^{2} (4.4/sq mi)
Median age	31.2 (M: 28.6, F: 33.2)	32.0 (M: 33.0, F: 30.0)	28.5 (M: 28.2, F: 29.2)
Private dwellings	221 (total) 155 (occupied)	223 (total)	225 (total)
Median household income	$72,500	$80,896

References: 2021 2016 2011

Historical census populations – Pickle Lake

Year	Pop.	±%
1976	508	—
1981	552	+8.7%
1986	490	−11.2%
1991	654	+33.5%
1996	544	−16.8%

Year	Pop.	±%
2001	399	−26.7%
2006	479	+20.1%
2011	425	−11.3%
2016	388	−8.7%
2021	398	+2.6%

Source: Statistics Canada

== Climate ==
Pickle Lake has a humid continental climate that closely borders on a subarctic climate (Köppen Dfb/Dfc). Winters are cold and dry with a January high of −14.3 °C (6.3 °F) and a low of −24.1 °C (−11.4 °F). Snowfall averages 2.57 metres (101.2 in) with reliable cover from November to April. There are 17.3 nights where the temperature will drop below −30 °C (−22.0 °F).

Summers are warm and wetter but short with a July high of 23.0 °C (73.4 °F) and a low of 12.3 °C (54.1 °F). There are 4.8 days where the temperature will exceed 30.0 °C (86.0 °F). Precipitation tends to be higher during the summer months, with each month from June to August averaging 16 days with measurable precipitation.

The highest temperature ever recorded in Pickle Lake was 40.0 °C (104 °F) on 19 June 1933. The coldest temperature ever recorded was −51.2 °C (−60 °F) on 8 February 1934.

Climate data for Pickle Lake Airport, 1991–2020 normals, extremes 1930–present
Month	Jan	Feb	Mar	Apr	May	Jun	Jul	Aug	Sep	Oct	Nov	Dec	Year
Record high humidex	4.3	8.9	23.1	28.3	37.2	42.2	42.4	40.7	37.1	29.3	18.6	6.7	42.4
Record high °C (°F)	6.1 (43.0)	9.6 (49.3)	20.9 (69.6)	29.0 (84.2)	34.0 (93.2)	40.0 (104.0)	37.8 (100.0)	36.7 (98.1)	32.2 (90.0)	26.7 (80.1)	18.6 (65.5)	7.0 (44.6)	40.0 (104.0)
Mean daily maximum °C (°F)	−14.0 (6.8)	−10.4 (13.3)	−2.1 (28.2)	6.2 (43.2)	14.4 (57.9)	21.0 (69.8)	23.5 (74.3)	22.0 (71.6)	15.5 (59.9)	6.2 (43.2)	−3.3 (26.1)	−11.0 (12.2)	5.7 (42.3)
Daily mean °C (°F)	−18.9 (−2.0)	−16.2 (2.8)	−8.4 (16.9)	0.1 (32.2)	8.5 (47.3)	15.3 (59.5)	18.2 (64.8)	16.8 (62.2)	10.9 (51.6)	2.7 (36.9)	−6.8 (19.8)	−15.2 (4.6)	0.6 (33.1)
Mean daily minimum °C (°F)	−23.6 (−10.5)	−21.9 (−7.4)	−14.6 (5.7)	−5.9 (21.4)	2.6 (36.7)	9.5 (49.1)	12.7 (54.9)	11.5 (52.7)	6.2 (43.2)	−0.8 (30.6)	−10.2 (13.6)	−19.4 (−2.9)	−4.5 (23.9)
Record low °C (°F)	−46.7 (−52.1)	−51.2 (−60.2)	−41.7 (−43.1)	−32.8 (−27.0)	−17.8 (0.0)	−6.7 (19.9)	0.0 (32.0)	−2.8 (27.0)	−9.4 (15.1)	−24.4 (−11.9)	−38.8 (−37.8)	−47.8 (−54.0)	−51.2 (−60.2)
Record low wind chill	−58.3	−58.3	−48.8	−39.7	−23.5	−7.1	−2.0	0.0	−15.5	−27.1	−46.1	−54.4	−58.3
Average precipitation mm (inches)	28.2 (1.11)	19.6 (0.77)	32.5 (1.28)	37.7 (1.48)	69.3 (2.73)	99.1 (3.90)	102.2 (4.02)	87.6 (3.45)	93.6 (3.69)	66.3 (2.61)	46.4 (1.83)	31.2 (1.23)	713.6 (28.09)
Average rainfall mm (inches)	0.3 (0.01)	0.7 (0.03)	5.9 (0.23)	14.7 (0.58)	62.6 (2.46)	98.4 (3.87)	109.7 (4.32)	91.1 (3.59)	94.3 (3.71)	39.3 (1.55)	8.6 (0.34)	0.7 (0.03)	526.2 (20.72)
Average snowfall cm (inches)	37.7 (14.8)	25.8 (10.2)	33.0 (13.0)	24.5 (9.6)	12.4 (4.9)	0.4 (0.2)	0.0 (0.0)	0.0 (0.0)	3.7 (1.5)	29.6 (11.7)	50.5 (19.9)	42.2 (16.6)	259.7 (102.2)
Average precipitation days (≥ 0.2 mm)	15.1	11.6	12.3	9.0	13.4	15.1	16.9	14.8	16.0	15.9	16.6	15.6	172.3
Average rainy days (≥ 0.2 mm)	0.36	0.59	1.8	4.3	12.5	15.6	17.8	15.6	15.7	10.2	3.0	0.76	98.2
Average snowy days (≥ 0.2 cm)	15.5	11.6	11.5	6.0	3.3	0.23	0.0	0.0	1.2	8.6	15.3	16.3	89.6
Source: Environment Canada

== Media ==
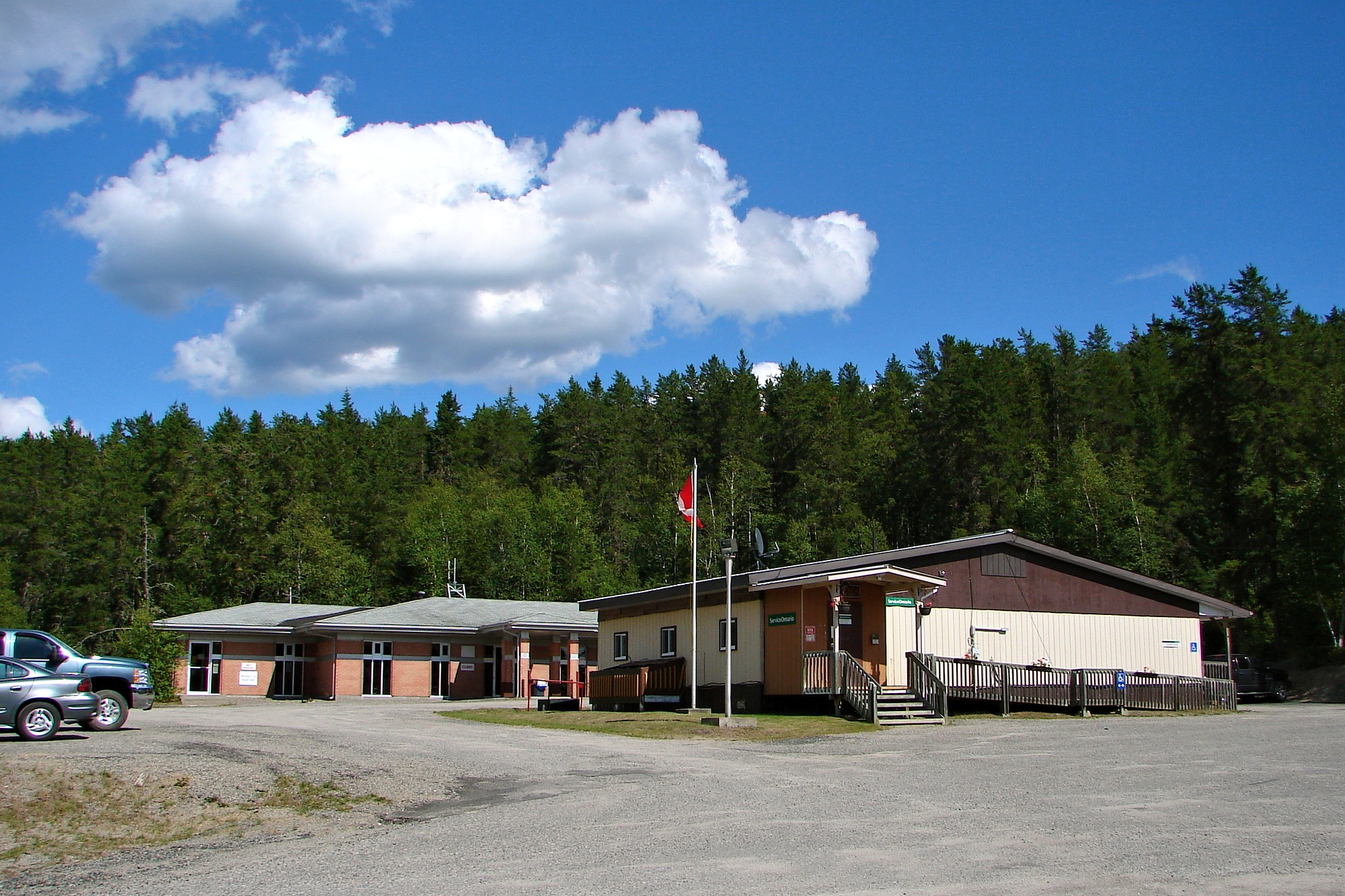
Pickle Lake municipal office and library

Pickle Lake's only local media service is the new CJTL-FM, which airs a mixed Christian radio and First Nations format. The region is otherwise served through rebroadcasters of services from larger cities such as Thunder Bay, Toronto and Winnipeg.

=== Radio ===
- FM 96.5 – CJTL-FM, Christian radio/First Nations
- FM 98.5 – CFDK-FM, (defunct)
- FM 105.1 – CBQP-FM, CBC Radio One (relays CBQT-FM, Thunder Bay)

== See also ==
- List of townships in Ontario
