= NorOntair =

Regional airline in Ontario, Canada

norOntair
IATA	ICAO	Call sign
NR	NOA	NORONTAIR
- Founded: October 18, 1971
- Ceased operations: March 29, 1996
- Hubs: Sault Ste. Marie; Thunder Bay
- Focus cities: Sudbury; Timmins
- Fleet size: 2 De Havilland Canada Dash 8; 8 De Havilland Canada DHC-6 Twin Otter
- Destinations: Kapuskasing, Timmins, North Bay, Sudbury, Sault Ste. Marie, Thunder Bay, Fort Frances, Winnipeg (Manitoba), Hearst, Chapleau, Earlton, Elliot Lake, Geraldton, Gore Bay, Hornepayne, Kirkland Lake, Terrace Bay, Pickle Lake, Red Lake, Kenora, Atikokan, Sioux Lookout, Wawa
- Parent company: Ontario Northland
- Headquarters: North Bay, Ontario
- Key people: Jim Kilgour (ONTC), Bill Davis (Premier)

NorOntair, stylized as norOntair, was a Canadian regional airline operating in northern Ontario from October 18, 1971 to March 29, 1996. It was as a subsidiary of Ontario Northland, a provincial Crown agency of the Government of Ontario, with the stated goal of creating east-west links across northern Ontario.

== History ==
ONTC's first foray into air services began when it subcontracted flying operations to various airlines including Bradley Air Service (First Air), Austin Airways, Air-Dale Ltd and OnAir (taken over by Bearskin Airlines). Air-Dale Ltd. based in Sault Ste Marie was the airline's main operations base. Two de Havilland Dash 8-102 aircraft and six Dash 6-300 Twin Otters were based in Sault Ste Marie. Two additional Twin Otters were based in Thunder Bay and were operated by Bearskin Airlines crews but painted in full NorOntair colours. In its final years, ONTC bought Air-Dale Ltd and operated all the remaining routes until the service was discontinued.

In 1996, the newly elected government of Premier Mike Harris moved to close down the airline by removing subsidies. However, this had a negative effect on the region's economy over the next several years.

NorOntair was the first airline in the world to order and take delivery of Bombardier's de Havilland Canada Dash 8 Series 100, on October 23, 1984, operated by Air-Dale Ltd. The first Dash 8 in commercial service anywhere in the world wore NorOntair colours and was registered C-GJCB. It was number 6 from the assembly line and remained in active service until the closure of the company flying up to 14 hours a day across Northern Ontario.

== Service area ==
The locations served included:

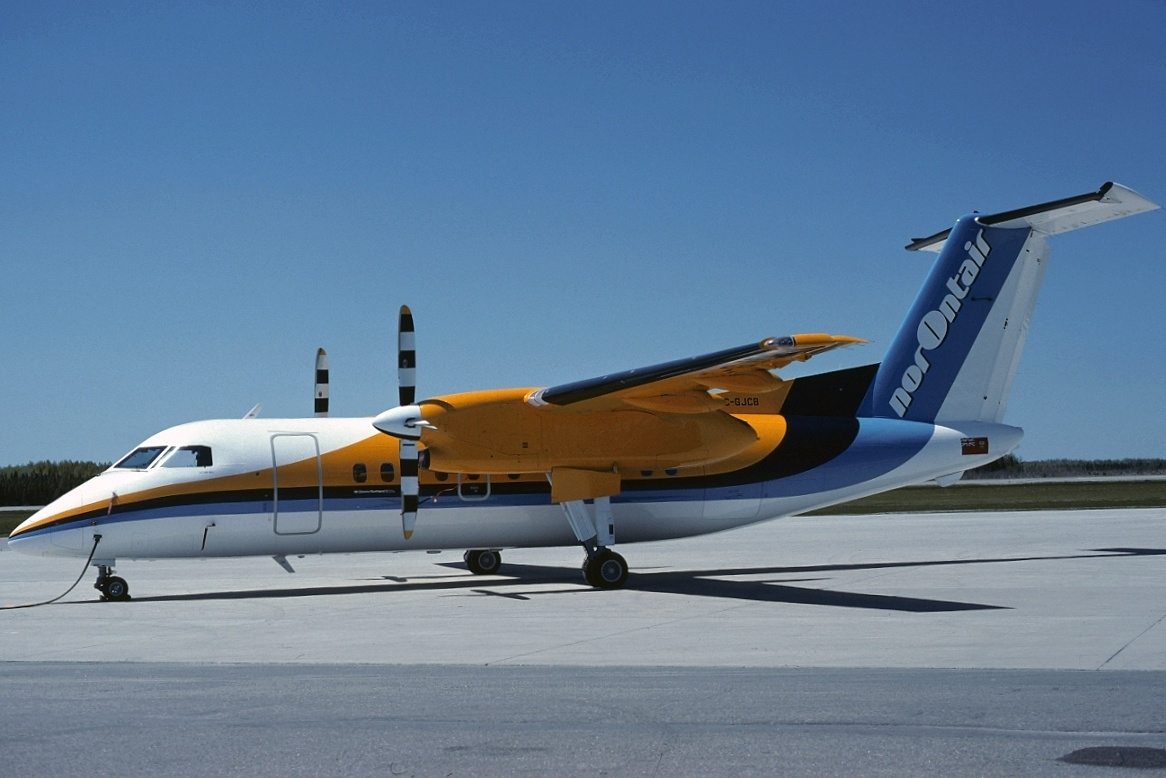
Dash 8 of NorOntair at Timmins Airport

Dash 8 service:

- Fort Frances
- Kapuskasing
- North Bay
- Sault Ste. Marie
- Sudbury
- Thunder Bay
- Timmins
- Winnipeg

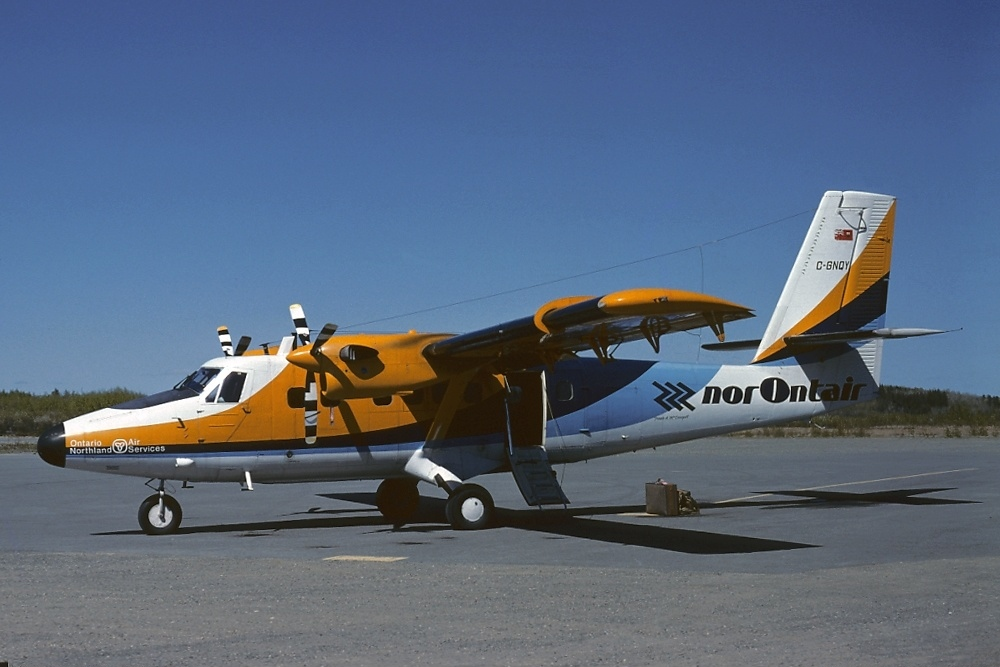
Twin Otter of NorOntair at Kirkland Lake Airport

Twin Otter service:

- Atikokan
- Chapleau
- Earlton
- Elliot Lake
- Geraldton
- Gore Bay
- Hearst
- Hornepayne
- Kenora
- Kirkland Lake
- Pickle Lake
- Red Lake
- Sioux Lookout
- Terrace Bay
- Wawa

== Incidents and accidents ==
A second Dash 8 joined the fleet shortly after the first and was registered C-GPYD. It was seriously damaged on approach into Sault Ste Marie on February 2, 1986. The aircraft suffered a hard landing during a cockpit crew training flight. This caused the aircraft's landing gear to collapse, causing significant damage to the newly acquired plane. Of particular concern to the airline and to de Havilland Canada at the time was that the crash caused one of the engine's propeller blades to violently break away from the engine housing. The blades penetrated the cabin wall of the aircraft, travelled through Row 2 of the aircraft interior and exited through the other side of the cabin sidewall on the opposite side. Since the aircraft was on a training flight, no passengers were on board. The flight crew escaped the aircraft without injury. The aircraft was removed from service and, after months of structural repairs and refurbishment, was returned to active service.

== See also ==
- List of defunct airlines of Canada
