= North Bay/Jack Garland Airport =

North Bay Airport North Bay/Jack Garland Airport
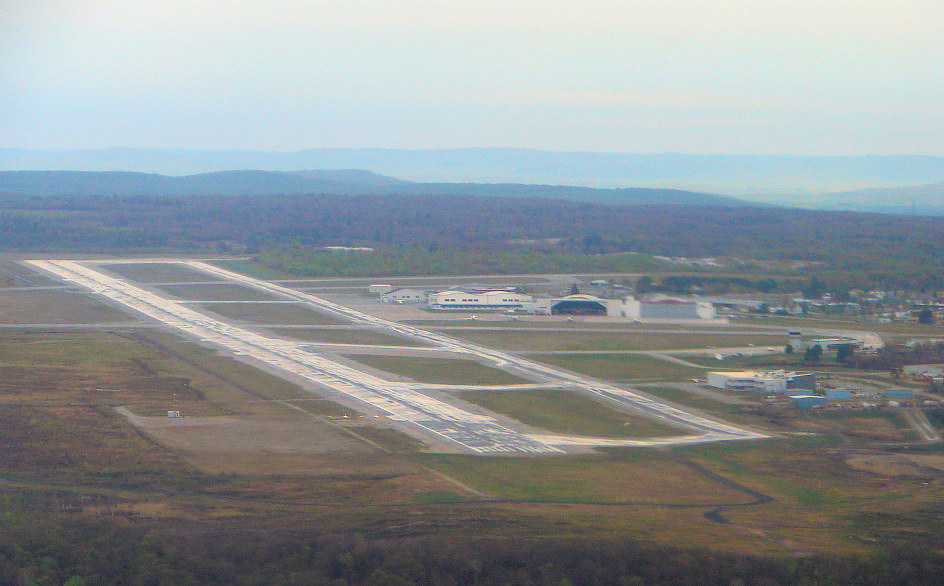
- Aerial view of Jack Garland Airport
- IATA: YYB; ICAO: CYYB; WMO: 71731

Summary
- Airport type: Public
- Owner: Municipality of North Bay
- Operator: North Bay Jack Garland Airport Corporation
- Serves: North Bay, Ontario
- Location: Hornell Heights
- Time zone: EST (UTC−05:00)
  - Summer (DST): EDT (UTC−04:00)
- Elevation AMSL: 1,215 ft (370 m)
- Coordinates: 46°21′50″N 079°25′27″W
- Website: yyb.ca

Map
- Location in Ontario CYYB (Canada)

Runways
Direction	Length		Surface
Direction	ft	m	Surface
08/26	10,004	3,049	Concrete
18/36	4,492	1,369	Asphalt
~~11/29~~	~~5,577~~	~~1,700~~	~~Asphalt~~

Statistics (2010)
- Aircraft movements: 45,177
- Source: Canada Flight Supplement; Environment Canada; Movements from Statistics Canada

North Bay Airport or North Bay/Jack Garland Airport (IATA: YYB, ICAO: CYYB) in North Bay, Ontario, Canada is located at Hornell Heights, 4 nautical miles (7.4 km; 4.6 mi) north-northeast of the city. It is located adjacent to Canadian Forces Base North Bay, operational since 1951 (as RCAF Station North Bay until 1966), the operational control centre for Canadian operations of the North American Aerospace Defense Command.

The airport is named in memory of Jack Garland, a longtime Member of Parliament for North Bay's Nipissing electoral district. Until 2004 it hosted an annual air show during North Bay's Heritage Festival, with a large military component.

The airport is classified as an airport of entry by Nav Canada and is staffed by the Canada Border Services Agency (CBSA). CBSA officers at this airport can handle general aviation aircraft only, with no more than 15 passengers.

The airport is home to the Canadore College's aviation campus which houses their aviation programs. Final assembly of the Canadair CL-415 (Bombardier 415) aircraft was completed at the airport from 1999 until 2015.

The city has owned the airport since 1998 after transfer from Transport Canada and North Bay Jack Garland Airport Corporation has run it since 2003.

== Airlines and destinations ==
=== Passenger ===
Airlines	Destinations
Bearskin Airlines	Sault Ste. Marie, Sudbury, Thunder Bay
WestJet	Seasonal: Calgary

=== Cargo ===
Airlines	Destinations
FedEx Express	Toronto–Pearson
SkyLink Express	Hamilton (ON), Sault Ste. Marie, Sudbury

== Terminal ==
The first terminal was constructed in 1938 to house a small waiting area on the ground floor and control tower on the second. Upgrades after World War II led to the second terminal being built in 1963, which now serves as the Administration Building and has offices for airport administration, Nav Canada, Canada Border Services Agency, and others. The current terminal was built in 2001 and has been renovated (completed 2010) to accommodate additional airline offices, a larger post screening waiting area with washrooms.

The airport, operated by the North Bay Jack Garland Airport Corporation, is certified by Transport Canada.

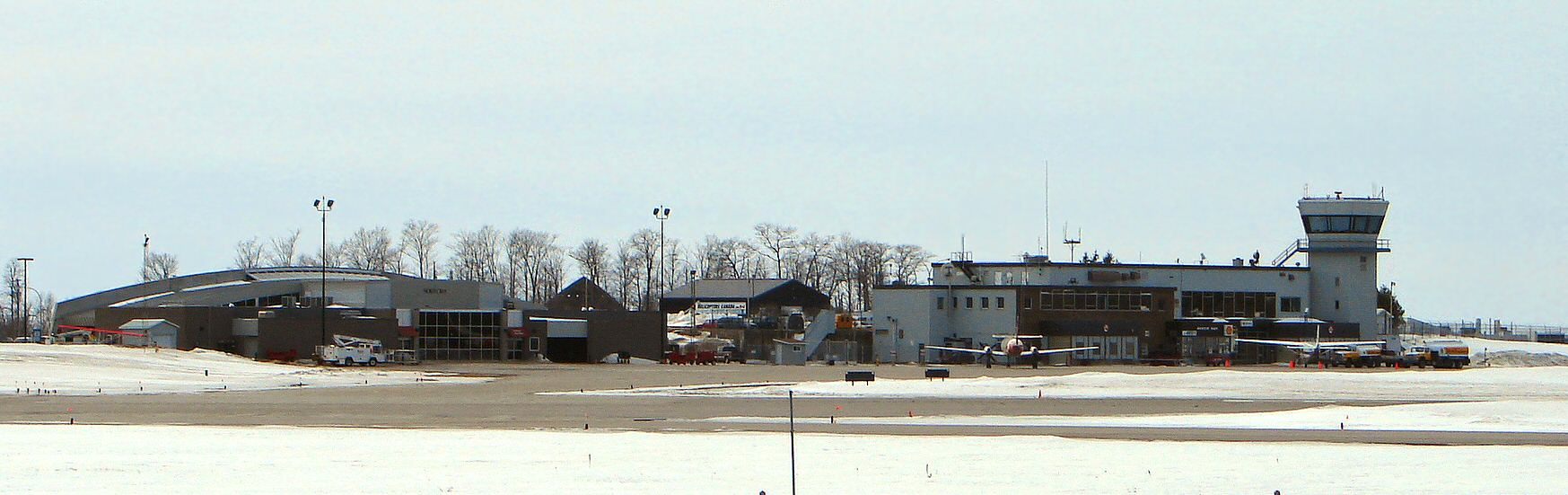
Jack Garland Airport

== Infrastructure ==
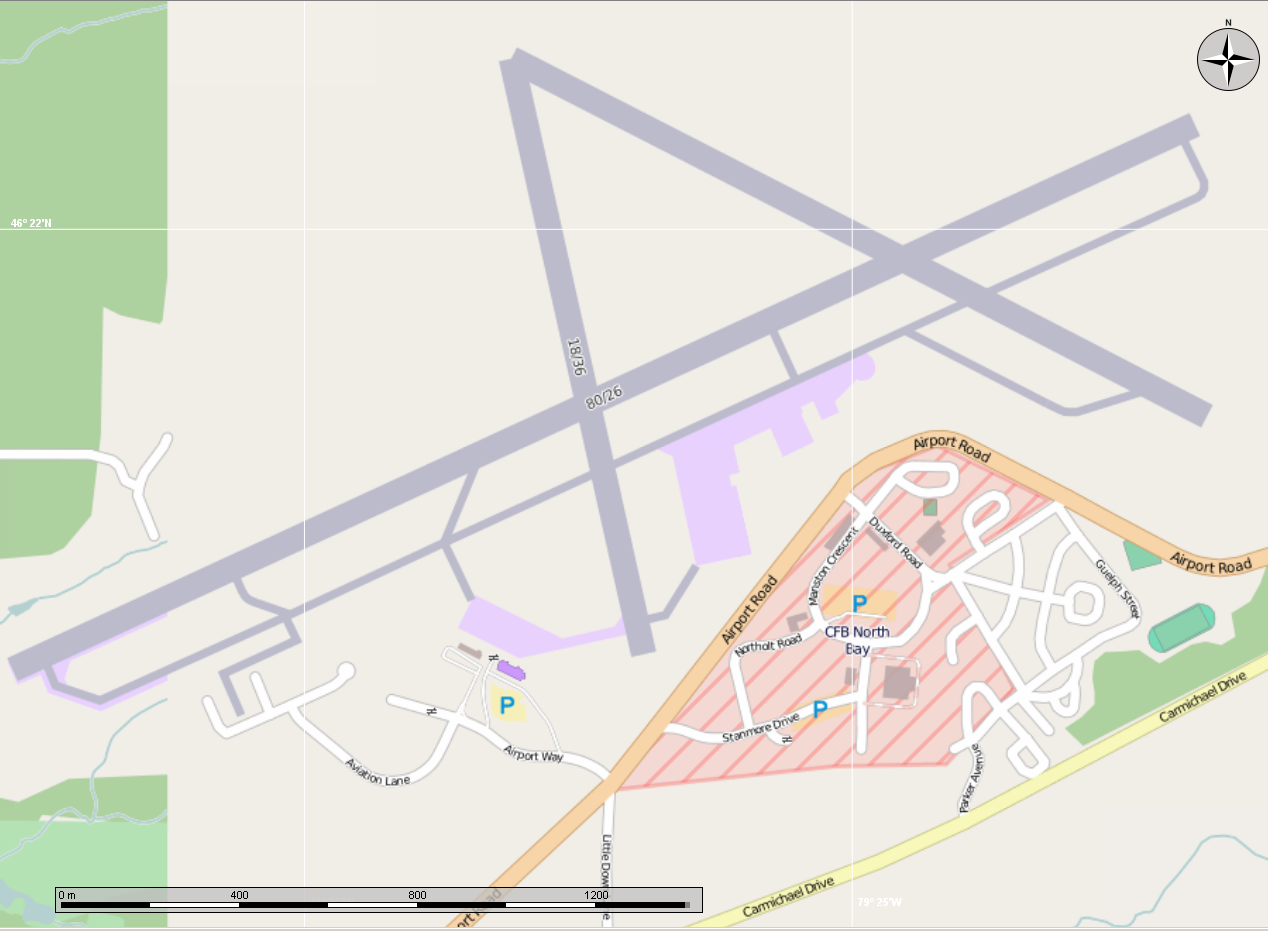
North Bay Airport, with CFB North Bay in red at the bottom of the image

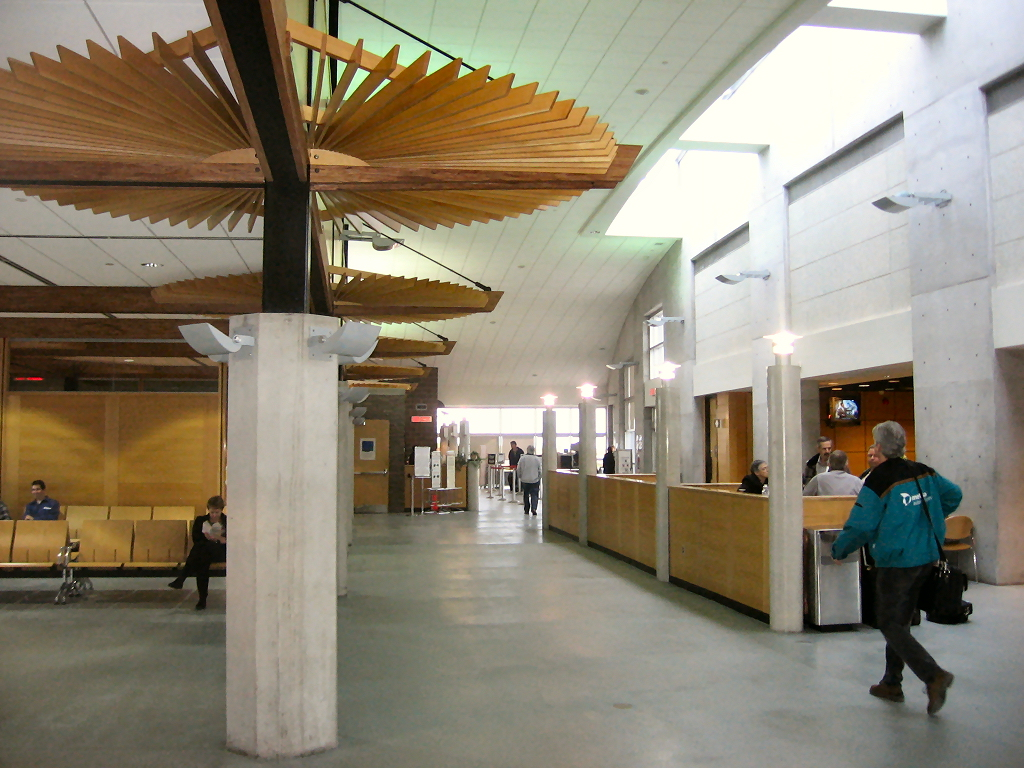
Jack Garland terminal interior

Besides travel by car, the airport is serviced by local taxis and North Bay Transit. An outdoor parking lot next to the terminal has approximately 200 regular and four accessible spots. Long term parking is available next to the Administration Building (Lot B).

=== Runways ===
- Runway 08/26: 10,004 ft × 150 ft (3,049 m × 46 m), asphalt, lighted, precision approach path indicator (PAPI) type 1 approach lighting for both ends, Instrument landing system (ILS), no curfew
- Runway 18/36: 4,492 ft × 148 ft (1,369 m × 45 m) asphalt, lighted, PAPI type 1 approach lighting for both ends
- Runway 13/31: 2,000 ft × 75 ft (610 m × 23 m), grass, unlighted, glider operations only

=== Communications ===
- Mandatory Frequency/ATF: North Bay Radio/Traffic, 118.3 MHz
- Remote communications outlet (RCO): London Radio, 123.55 MHz
- Automatic terminal information service (ATIS): 124.9 MHz
- PAL: Toronto Area Control Centre, 127.250 MHz
- Automated airport weather station (AWOS) 124.9 MHz

=== Navigation aids ===
- Non-directional beacon (NDB)s: YELLEK (ZYB), 404 kHz, 3.8 NM (7.0 km; 4.4 mi) 77° to airport
- VHF omnidirectional range (VOR)/Distance measuring equipment (DME): North Bay (YYB), 115.4 MHz/Channel 101, at airport
- ILS: Runway 08, 110.9 MHz

=== General ===
- Latitude/longitude: 46°21′50″N 079°25′27″W
- Elevation: 1,215 ft (370 m) AMSL
- Magnetic variation: 11° west

=== FBOs ===
Overnight parking is available through the main airport authority.

- Weisflock Aviation : Avgas (100LL) and Jet-A fuel
- Voyageur Airport Services (WorldFuel): Jet-A, FBO and De-icing 705-482-7435

== Bombardier Aerospace ==
Bombardier Aerospace assembled the CL-415 water bomber at the airport until production ended in 2015.

== See also ==
- North Bay Water Aerodrome
