= Wawa Airport =

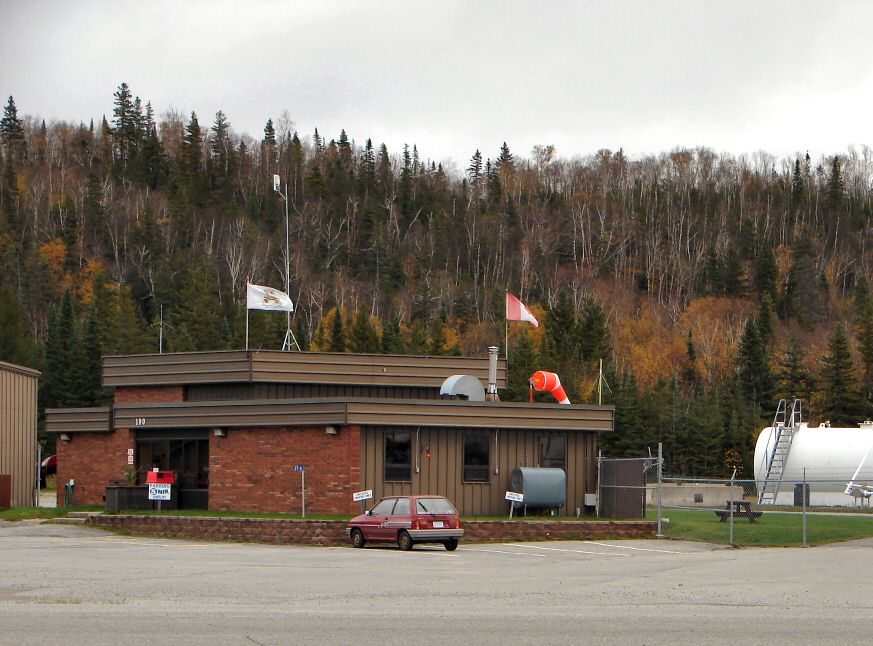
- IATA: YXZ; ICAO: CYXZ; WMO: 71738

Summary
- Airport type: Public
- Operator: The Corporation of the Municipality of Wawa
- Location: Wawa, Ontario
- Time zone: EST (UTC−05:00)
  - Summer (DST): EDT (UTC−04:00)
- Elevation AMSL: 944 ft / 288 m
- Coordinates: 47°58′01″N 084°47′11″W

Map
- Location in Ontario

Runways
Direction	Length		Surface
Direction	ft	m	Surface
03/21	4,429	1,350	Asphalt
- Sources: Canada Flight Supplement; Environment Canada

Wawa Airport (IATA: YXZ, ICAO: CYXZ) is a registered airport located 1.7 nautical miles (3.1 km; 2.0 mi) south southwest of Wawa, Ontario, Canada. The airport serves chartered passenger flights, general aviation, and air ambulance (MEDEVAC).

== History ==
The idea to convert the already existing gravel Algoma Ore mine airstrip into an airport was proposed in 1968 by the Wawa Chamber of Commerce. The project had funding issues leading up to the development of the airport. The Michipicoten Township Council expected the Ontario Government to pay for the total cost of the airport, but they had only paid 50% of the estimated cost, relying on the town council to fundraise money locally. The licensing for the airstrip was tentatively approved for 3,300 ft (1,000 m) of the available 4,600 ft (1,400 m) on May 26, 1969, by the Canada Department of Transport, along with setting aside $1 million for the development of the project, relieving funding issues. Only 3,300 feet were issued a license due to nearby rocks and trees making a part of the airstrip unsafe.

On October 1, 1974, Michipicoten Township Council passed a resolution to expand the runway from the licensed 3,300 ft (1,000 m) to a minimum of 4,000 ft (1,200 m).

Although commercial flights started flying in and out of the airport on July 17, 1975, the airport officially opened on August 11 by Premier Bill Davis. The airport originally served daily passenger flights to Sault Ste. Marie, Thunder Bay, and other small communities nearby by Air-Dale and NorOntair. A single DHC-6 Twin Otter serviced the airport.

A resurfacing project began in the summer of 1977, shutting down the airport. The airport reopened on July 20, 1978. Initially expecting the project to cost $20,000, the project went over the estimate by $80,000 for a total of $100,000.

A terminal for the airport opened in September 1980.

Worries about the airport operation arose in January 1996 after the closure of NorOntair, which expected the airport to lose $600,000 per year. The worries were resolved after Bearskin Airlines started operating regular passenger service in and out of the airport, filling in the revenue costs.

The runway temporarily closed from September 2, 1997, to October 6 due to maintenance repairs, which began in July 1997.

Air Georgian signed a two-year contract on June 1, 1999, replacing Bearskin Airlines as the regular passenger service in and out of Wawa. Service ceased on February 10, 2001, after no attempts to renew the contract, marking the last regular passenger service to go through the airport.

== Accidents and incidents ==
- On July 18, 1980, a private helicopter crashed shortly after takeoff. One man was injured.
- On November 27, 2023, a medical transport flight flown on a Mitsubishi MU-2 by Thunder Airlines crashed upon landing, destroying the plane. No injuries were reported, but the runway was closed for over 2 days.
