= Sault Ste. Marie Airport =

Airport in Ontario, Canada

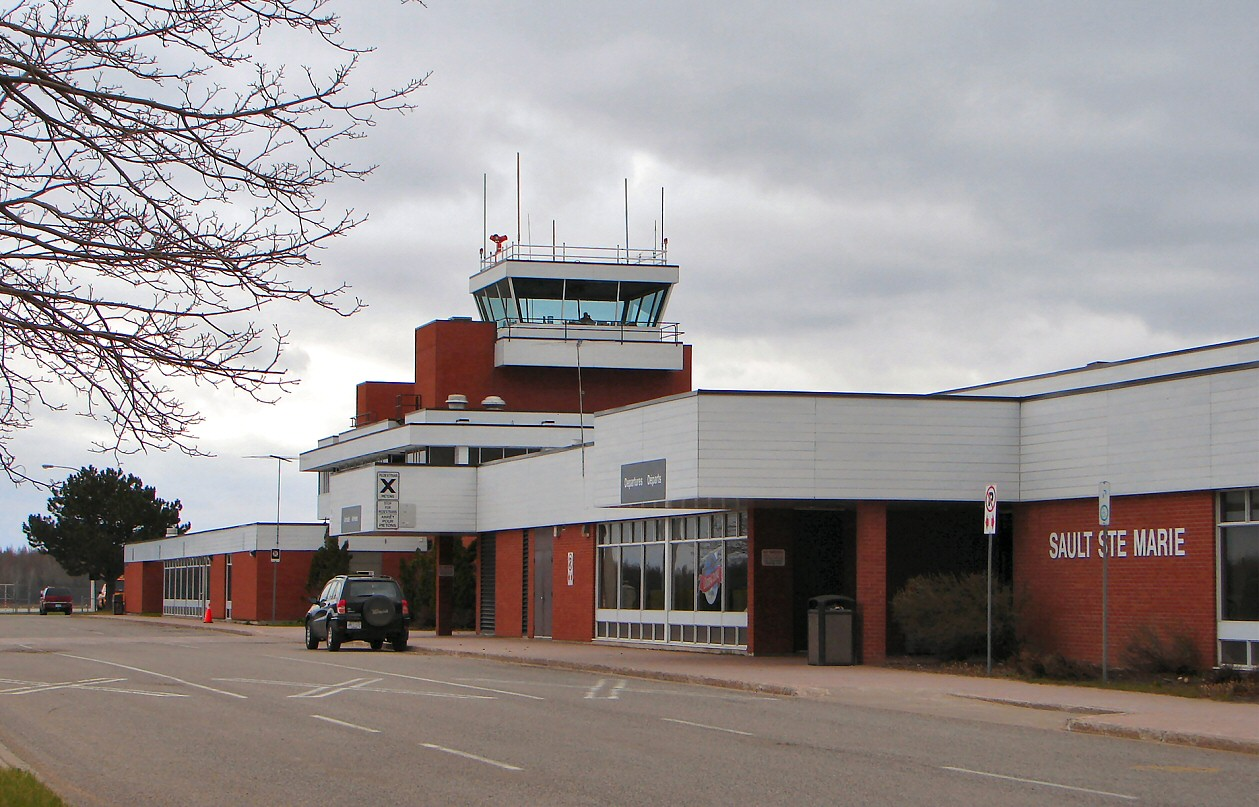
- IATA: YAM; ICAO: CYAM; WMO: 71260

Summary
- Airport type: Public
- Operator: Sault Ste. Marie Airport Development Corporation
- Location: Sault Ste. Marie, Ontario
- Time zone: EST (UTC−05:00)
  - Summer (DST): EDT (UTC−04:00)
- Elevation AMSL: 629 ft (192 m)
- Coordinates: 46°29′07″N 084°30′34″W
- Website: saultairport.com

Map
- Location in Ontario CYAM (Canada)

Runways
Direction	Length		Surface
Direction	ft	m	Surface
04/22	6,000	1,829	Asphalt
12/30	6,000	1,829	Asphalt

Statistics (2025)
- Total passengers: 153,202

Sault Ste. Marie Airport (IATA: YAM, ICAO: CYAM) is an international airport located 8.0 nautical miles (14.8 km; 9.2 mi) west-southwest of the city of Sault Ste. Marie, Ontario, Canada at the far eastern end of Lake Superior and the beginning of the St. Mary's River.

== History ==
The Canadian government opened the airport in 1961 and operated it until 1998, when it handed control over to the newly formed Sault Ste. Marie Airport Development Corporation (SSMADC) under the terms of the National Airports Policy. Of the 23 Ontario regional, local, or small airports handed over under the policy, the Sault Ste. Marie airport is the only one not affiliated with a municipality, since the city of Sault Ste. Marie declined to assume control.

In 2002, the SSMADC opened Runway Park, an entertainment and recreation area, on unused airport property to help generate revenue to support the airport's operation.

=== Historical airline jet service ===
- Air Canada: Bombardier CRJ-100, Bombardier CRJ-200, DC-9-30, Airbus A319-100, Airbus A320-200, Airbus A321-211 (Sault Ste. Marie-Toronto in 1967 to 1989 using DC-9-30 but rest was charter)
- Canadian Airlines International: Boeing 737-200 (Sault Ste. Marie-Toronto in 1987 to 1989)
- Canadian Partner: ATR 42, EMB-120 Brasilia (Sault Ste. Marie-Toronto in 1989 to 1993)
- Canadian Regional Airlines: Dash 8-100, Dash 8-300, Fokker F28 (Sault Ste. Marie-Toronto in 1993 to 2000)
- Canjet: Boeing 737-800 (Seasonal in 2010's)
- Nordair: Boeing 737-200 (Sault Ste. Marie-Toronto in 1968 to 1987)
- NorOntair: Dash 6 Twin Otter, Dash 8-100 (Sault Ste. Marie-Sudbury, Sault Ste. Marie-Thunder Bay, Sault Ste. Marie-Elliot Lake, Sault Ste. Marie-Wawa in 1971-1996)
- WestJet: Boeing 737-200 (Sault Ste. Marie-Hamilton in 2001 to 2004)

== Airlines and destinations ==
=== Passenger ===
Airlines	Destinations
Air Canada Express	Toronto–Pearson
Bearskin Airlines	Sudbury, Thunder Bay
Porter Airlines	Toronto–Billy Bishop
WestJet	Seasonal: Calgary

=== Cargo ===
Airlines	Destinations
FedEx Express	Sudbury, Toronto–Pearson
SkyLink Express	Hamilton (ON), Sudbury

== Operations ==
The Sault Ste. Marie airport has equipment to support instrument approaches for all-weather operation, and a Nav Canada control tower. Air Canada Express operates two daily roundtrip flights to Toronto Pearson International Airport using the Dash 8-400. Porter Airlines operates two daily roundtrip flights to Toronto Billy Bishop Airport using the Dash 8-400. Its runways are designed to handle medium-sized transport jets such as the Airbus A320, Airbus A319 and Boeing 737. Operations to Sault Ste. Marie consist of Dash 8 aircraft.

The airport is classified as an airport of entry by Nav Canada and is staffed by the Canada Border Services Agency (CBSA) on a call-out basis from the Sault Ste. Marie International Bridge. CBSA officers at this airport can handle aircraft with no more than 30 passengers.

A new record number of 216,172 passengers travelled through the airport in 2018.

=== General aviation operations ===
The airport hosts the flight-training campus for Sault College and the Sault Academy of Flight flying school, resulting in frequent training flights in the vicinity. The Sault Ste. Marie airport has frequent medevac, business aviation, and charter operations. It is a frequent stopping point for private pilots.

=== Ministry of Natural Resources Fire Management & Flight Training Centre ===
Sault Ste. Marie Airport is home to the Ministry of Natural Resources Fire Management Centre and Flight Training Centre. The 622-square-metre facility is the first of its kind in Ontario. It is equipped with one of the most advanced flight training devices available, which simulates the sights, sounds and motions of the Canadair CL-415 water bomber aircraft used to fight forest fires in Ontario.

== Statistics ==
Annual passenger traffic
Year	Passengers
2010	118,932
2011	173,676
2012	184,705
2013	187,165
2014	198,092
2015	202,557
2016	212,493
2017	214,532
2018	216,172
2019	211,277
2020	56,768
2021	51,347
2022	131,901
2023	160,406
2024	153,571
2025	153,202

== Incidents and accidents ==
- On May 26, 2013, flight POE689, a Dash 8-400 (registration GLQO) operated by Porter Airlines, suffered a tailstrike while landing on runway 30. There were no injuries but the aircraft received significant damage. The Transportation Safety Board of Canada cited an unstable approach that continued to a landing as a contributing factor.
- On February 24, 2015, flight JZA7795, a Dash 8-102 (registration C-GTAI) operated by Jazz Aviation touched down approximately 450 ft (140 m) before the threshold of runway 30 while attempting to land in conditions of poor visibility. The aircraft received significant damage, requiring replacement of both nose and main landing gear. It also struck an approach light, which was damaged beyond repair and subsequently replaced. The Transportation Safety Board noted that the approach was flown above the required stabilized approach speed, and furthermore that this was the case for 84% of flights on the incident aircraft's flight data recorder, indicating a systemic deviance from stabilized approach SOPs. Shortly after this incident, Jazz Aviation revised the relevant section of its operating manual.
- On May 2, 2021, a Canadair CL-415 (registration C-GOGH), a water bomber operated by the Ontario Ministry of Natural Resources, unintentionally landed with gear up during a training exercise, receiving significant damage to the belly of the aircraft.
- On April 16, 2023, flight POE2691, a Dash 8-400 (registration C-GLQB) operated by Porter Airlines overran RWY 12. There were no injuries and the aircraft sustained minor damage. The Transportation Safety Board of Canada cited an unstable approach and late touchdown referencing pilot error to be the contributing factor.
- On April 2, 2024, C-GERR, a Zlin Z242L operated by Sault College, crashed on landing during a training flight. The two occupants were taken to hospital and the runway closed.

== See also ==
- List of airports in the Sault Ste. Marie, Ontario area
