= Prince Edward Air =

Canadian airline

IATA	ICAO	Call sign
-	CME	COMET
- Founded: 1989
- Ceased operations: 2010
- Fleet size: 11
- Parent company: Cargojet
- Headquarters: Charlottetown, Prince Edward Island
- Key people: Robert Bateman, Founding President

Prince Edward Air Ltd. was an airline headquartered in Charlottetown, Prince Edward Island, Canada. The airline offered a variety of services including: scheduled cargo, ad-hoc charter, air medevac, maintenance, sales and service.

== History ==
Prince Edward Air was founded as an entrepreneurial venture in 1989 to pursue market opportunities in air medical evacuation, courier, and scheduled passenger and on-call air charters for business and pleasure. The company started with one leased aircraft and one pilot, founding president, Robert Bateman.

On May 1, 2008 Cargojet Airways acquired 51% ownership of Prince Edward Airlines. At that time, it had 28 aircraft and 140+ employees with daily flights into several airports in Eastern Canada, Quebec, Ontario, as well as, JFK International. In March 2009 the remainder of the company was acquired by Cargojet Airways, increasing the overall majority of the companies as a whole. With the main hub in Hamilton, Ontario, Cargojet utilized extended bases in the East coast to operate the Cargojet Regional division of its operation. In July 2009, Prince Edward Air (subsidiary of Cargojet) entered into a partnership with SkyLink Express Inc consolidating the PE Air and SkyLink Express fleets/operational routes under Cargojet Regional Partnership. In July 2010, SkyLink Express Inc purchased Prince Edward Air's 55% stake of Cargojet Regional Partnership to take 100% ownership of the regional routes, as well as, much of PE Air's fleet and assets. Operational control was transferred from Prince Edward Air (subsidiary of Cargojet) to SkyLink Express Inc on November 1, 2010, ending Prince Edward Air operations.

== Fleet ==
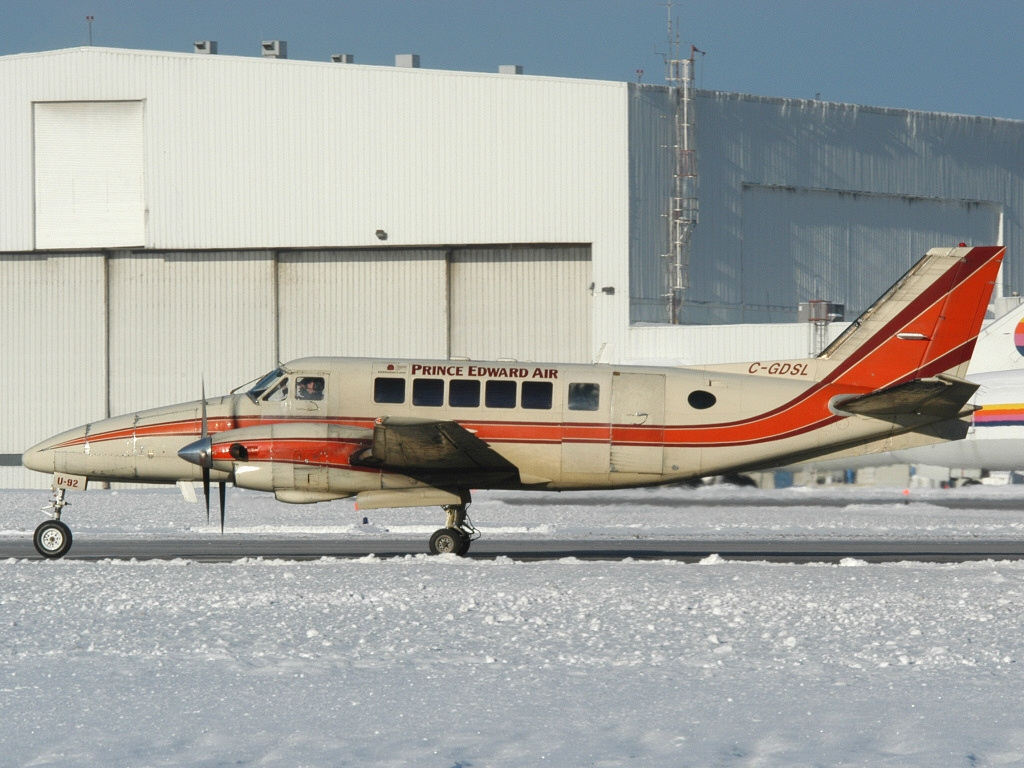
Prince Edward Air Beech 99 Airliner

As of November 2010 the Prince Edward Air (subsidiary of Cargojet) fleet was either up for sale or on long-term lease:

- 2 Beechcraft Model 99
- 1 Beechcraft 1900C Airliner
- 1 King Air 200
- 7 Piper Chieftain

== See also ==
- List of defunct airlines of Canada
