= Sudbury Airport =

Airport in Ontario, Canada

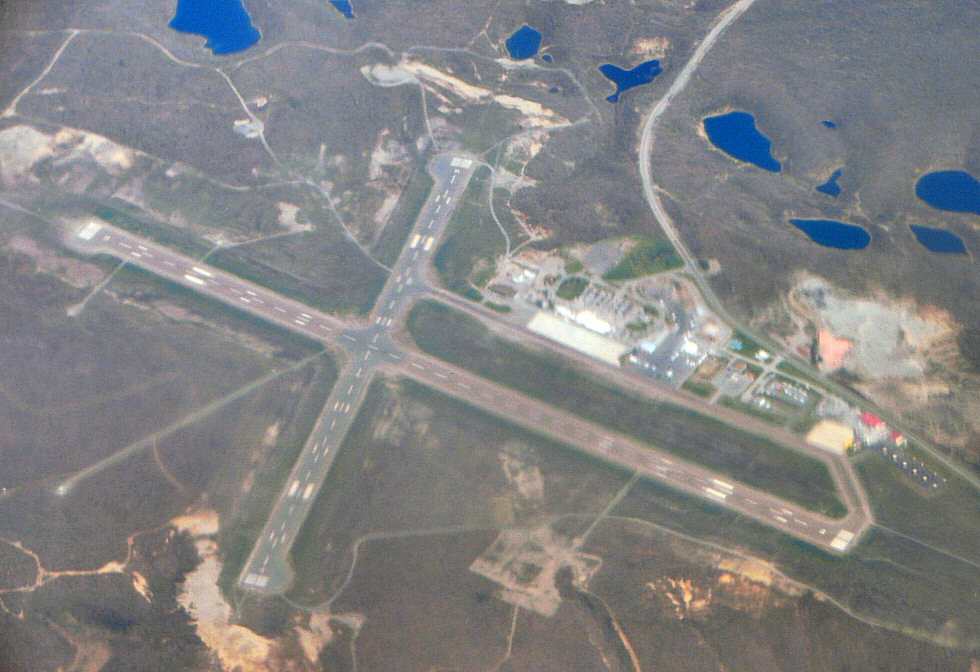
- IATA: YSB; ICAO: CYSB; WMO: 71730

Summary
- Airport type: Public
- Operator: Municipality of Sudbury
- Serves: Greater Sudbury, Ontario
- Location: Garson, Greater Sudbury
- Time zone: EST (UTC−05:00)
  - Summer (DST): EDT (UTC−04:00)
- Elevation AMSL: 1,143 ft (348 m)
- Coordinates: 46°37′32″N 080°47′52″W
- Website: www.flysudbury.ca

Map
- Location in Ontario CYSB (Canada)

Runways
Direction	Length		Surface
Direction	ft	m	Surface
04/22	6,600	2,012	Asphalt
12/30	5,000	1,524	Asphalt

Statistics (2020)
- Number of passengers: 66,638
- Source: Canada Flight Supplement; Environment Canada; Passengers from Statistics Canada

Sudbury Airport or Greater Sudbury Airport (IATA: YSB, ICAO: CYSB) is an airport in the Canadian city of Greater Sudbury, Ontario and is located 11 nautical miles (20 km; 13 mi) northeast of the downtown area, on Municipal Road 86 between the communities of Garson and Skead. Although in many contexts the airport uses the name Greater Sudbury Airport, its official name, as registered with Transport Canada and printed in all aeronautical publications, is still simply Sudbury Airport.

The airport is classified as an airport of entry by Nav Canada and is serviced by the Canada Border Services Agency (CBSA) on a call-out basis from the North Bay/Jack Garland Airport. CBSA officers at this airport currently can handle general aviation aircraft only, with no more than 15 passengers.

The airport is served primarily by regional carrier lines such as Air Canada Express, Bearskin Airlines, and Porter Airlines. It is also a base of Ornge air ambulance service and the Ontario Ministry of the Environment wildfire service.

== History ==
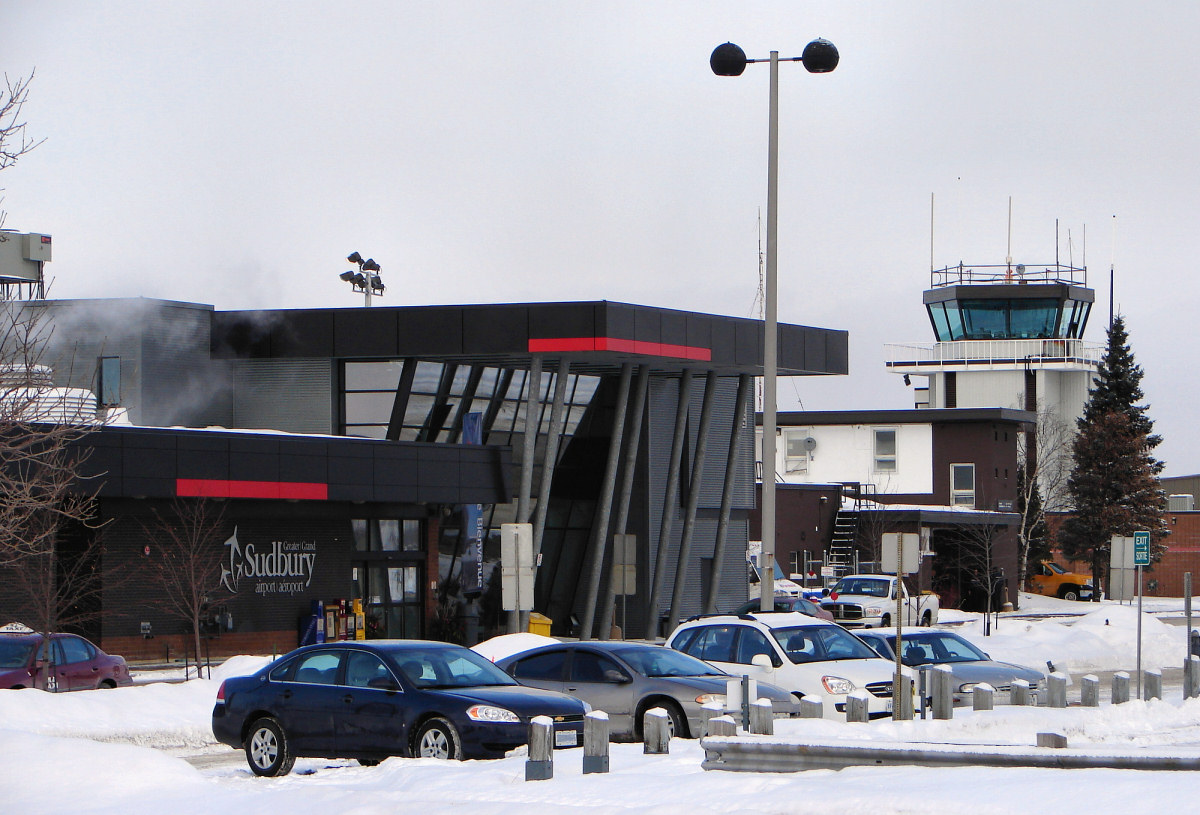
Terminal building and control tower

Sudbury Airport began as an emergency landing facility with a single 6,600 ft (2,000 m) landing strip for CF-100s from CFB North Bay in 1952.

On February 25, 1953, the Sudbury Airport Committee was formed to lobby and arrange for commercial flights to Sudbury. A second landing strip and a terminal building had to be built and construction of these were completed in 1955. Regular commercial air service began on February 1, 1954, by Trans-Canada Air Lines.

The air traffic control tower was added in 1972 and the terminal building was replaced with a larger one in 1973, which was renovated and expanded again in the early 2000s.

From 1972 to 2000, Sudbury Airport was owned by the Federal Government and operated by the transportation department of Sudbury. On March 31, 2000, the airport ownership and management were transferred to the Sudbury Airport Community Development Corporation (SACDC).

In 2005, Sunwing Airlines offered direct flights to Varadero, Cuba from the Sudbury airport every Wednesdays for the 2005 - 2006 winter season. Other destinations were added in the following years.

In June 2008, under recommendation from Nav Canada following a year-long aeronautical study, the control tower was closed mainly due to lack of traffic. The airport is now staffed 24 hours as a flight service station.

In March 2012, after WestJet confirmed its plans to launch a regional airline, Gregg Saretsky said in an interview with The Globe and Mail that Sudbury was one of the cities where the company was considering expanding its service. However, Sudbury was not chosen as a destination. The manager of the airport suggested in 2014 that the airport would have to see considerable growth in passenger traffic before WestJet would consider returning to Sudbury. In February 2017, WestJet did return to Sudbury using WestJet Encore for three daily flights to Toronto's Pearson International Airport, but stopped again in October 2018. WestJet had previously operated flights between Sudbury and Hamilton between 2001 and 2004.

Airport tenants include a training facility operated by MAG Aerospace and the Ministry of Natural Resources and Forestry's Sudbury Forest Fire Management Centre.

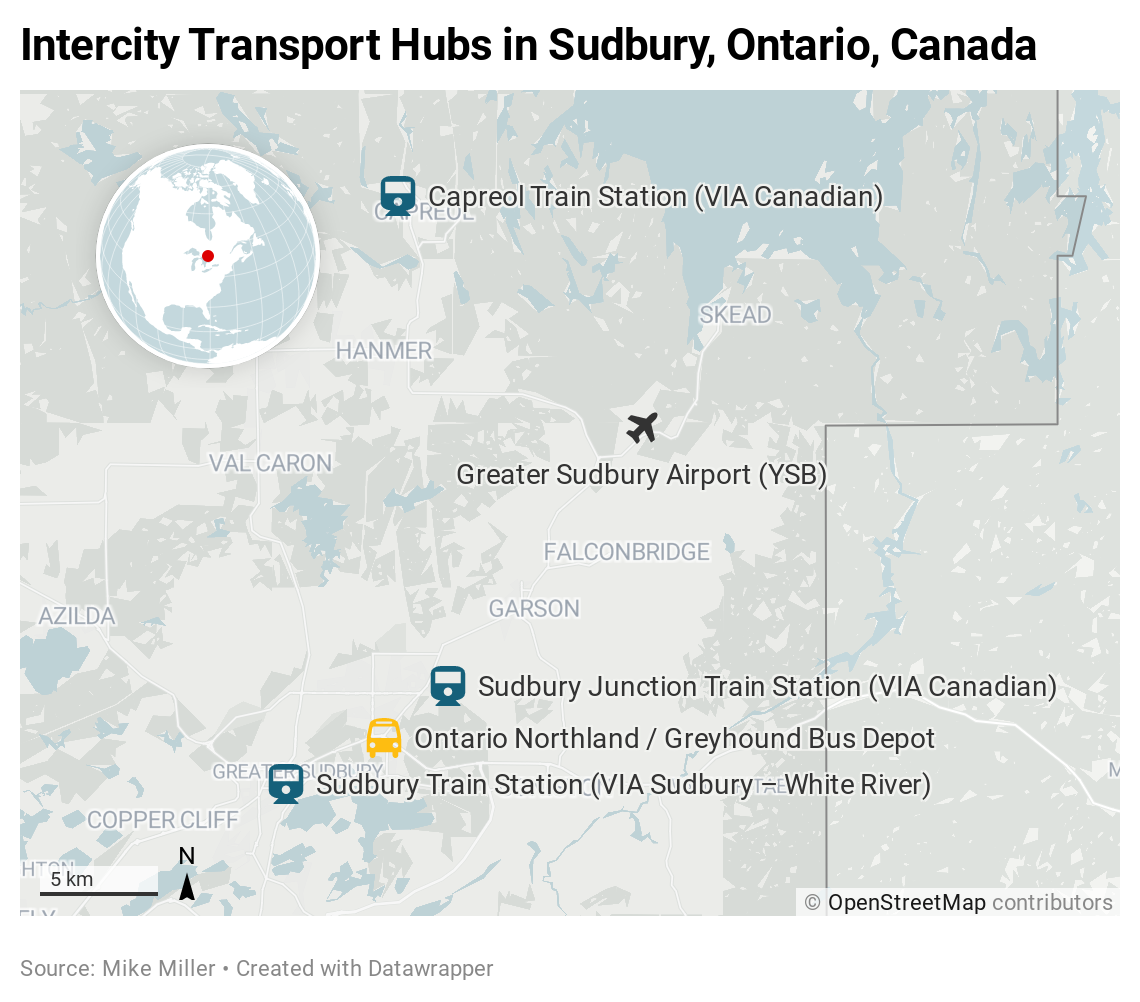
Intercity transport hubs in Sudbury, Ontario

== Airlines and destinations ==
=== Passenger ===
Airlines	Destinations
Air Canada Express	Toronto–Pearson
Bearskin Airlines	North Bay, Sault Ste. Marie, Thunder Bay
Propair	Montréal–Trudeau, Ottawa, Québec City
WestJet	Seasonal: Calgary

=== Cargo ===
Airlines	Destinations
Air Canada Cargo	Toronto–Pearson
FedEx Express	Timmins, Toronto–Pearson
SkyLink Express	Hamilton (ON), Sault Ste. Marie

=== Medivac ===
- Ornge
- Thunder Airlines
- Air Bravo Corp
- SkyCare Air Ambulance

== Frequencies ==
Sudbury had a non-directional beacon (NDB) that transmitted "SB" in Morse code on the longwave radio frequency of 362 kHz. (SB which operated at 362 kHz was decommissioned on December 5, 2023)

- 121.800 CJJ20 BM CSQ Sudbury Gnd
- 125.500 CJJ2 BM CSQ Sudbury FSS
- 127.400 CJJ20 F CSQ Sudbury ATIS

== See also ==
- Sudbury/Azilda Water Aerodrome
- Sudbury/Coniston Airport
- Sudbury/Ramsey Lake Water Aerodrome
