= De Havilland Canada Dash 8 =

Canadian turboprop airliner

Dash 8 Q-Series
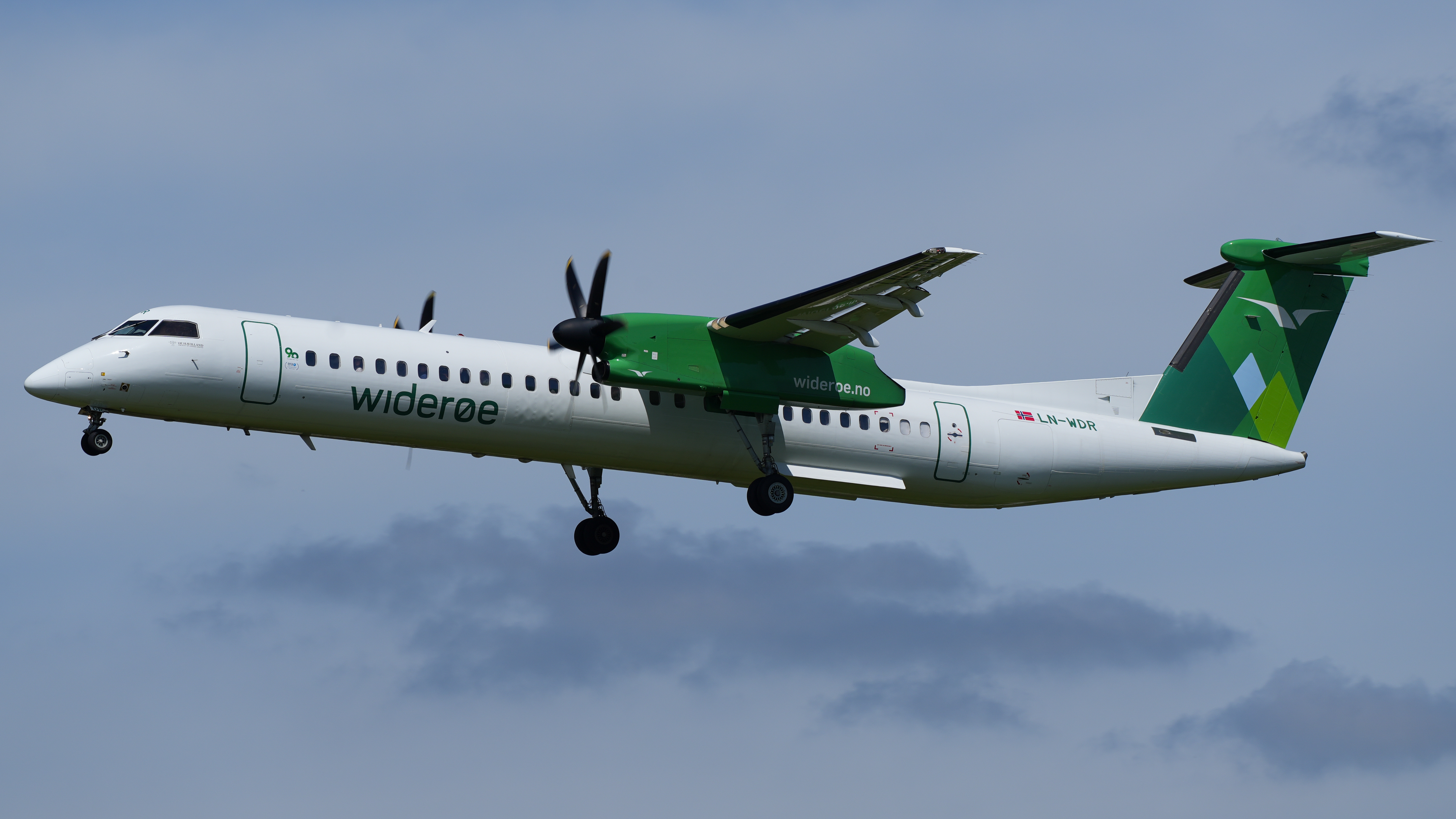
- Widerøe Q400

General information
- Type: Turboprop regional airliner
- National origin: Canada
- Manufacturer: de Havilland Canada (1983–1992); Bombardier Aerospace (1992–2019); De Havilland Canada (2019–2022)
- Status: Production suspended since 2022, pending new facility
- Primary users: QantasLink: WestJet Encore; Widerøe; Voyageur Airways
- Number built: 1,258 (as of March 31, 2019)

History
- Manufactured: 1983–2005 (-100); 1995–2009 (-200); 1989–2009 (-300); 1999–2022 (-400)
- Introduction date: 1984 with NorOntair
- First flight: June 20, 1983
- Developed from: de Havilland Canada Dash 7
- Variant: De Havilland Canada E-9A Widget

The De Havilland Canada DHC-8, commonly known as the Dash 8, is a series of turboprop-powered regional airliners, introduced by de Havilland Canada (DHC) in 1984. DHC was bought by Boeing in 1986, then by Bombardier in 1992, then by Longview Aviation Capital in 2019, which revived the De Havilland Canada brand. Powered by two Pratt & Whitney Canada PW100-series engines, it was developed from the Dash 7 with improved cruise performance and lower operational costs, but without STOL performance. The Dash 8 was offered in four sizes: the initial Series 100 (1984–2005), the more powerful Series 200 (1995–2009) with 37–40 seats, the Series 300 (1989–2009) with 50–56 seats, and Series 400 (1999–2022) with 68–90 seats. The QSeries (Q for quiet) are post-1997 variants fitted with active noise control systems.

According to the terms of a property transaction made by Bombardier before the 2019 sale to DHC, DHC had to vacate its Downsview, Toronto, manufacturing facility in August 2022, and as of August 2023 is planning to restart Dash 8 production in Wheatland County, Alberta, by 2033. At the July 2024 Farnborough International Air Show, DHC announced orders for seven Series 400 aircraft, an order for a newly introduced quick-change combi aircraft conversion kit, and a new factory refurbishment programme.

== Development ==
=== Initial development ===
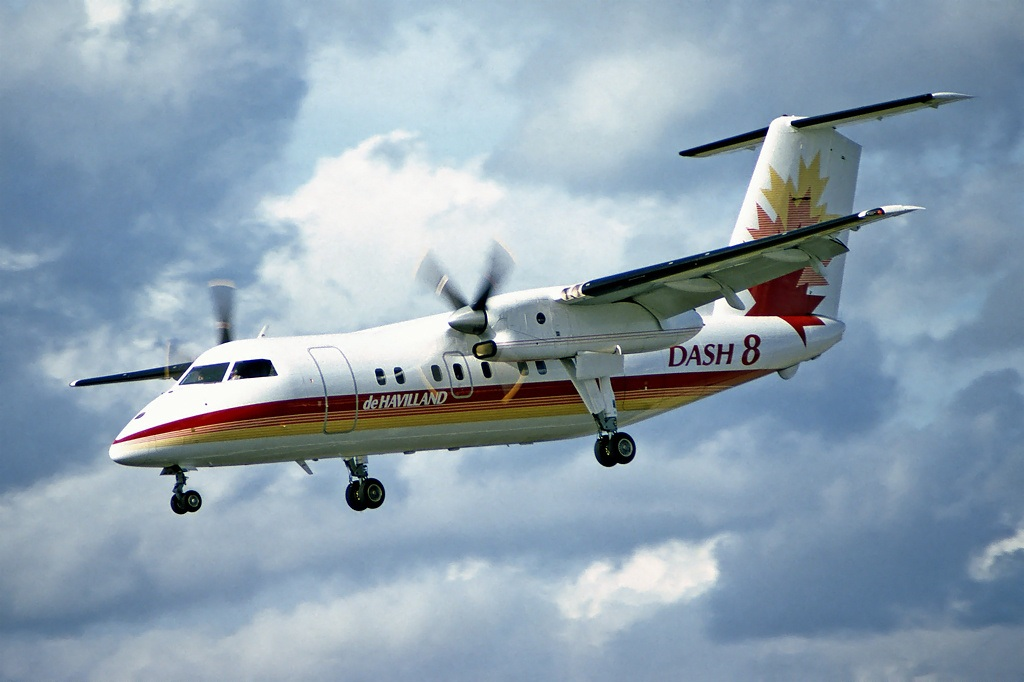
In DHC colours at Farnborough in 1984

In the 1970s, de Havilland Canada had invested heavily in its Dash 7 project, concentrating on STOL and short-field performance, the company's traditional area of expertise. Using four medium-power engines with large, four-bladed propellers resulted in comparatively lower noise levels, which combined with its excellent STOL characteristics, made the Dash 7 suitable for operating from small in-city airports, a market DHC felt would be compelling. However, only a handful of air carriers employed the Dash 7, as most regional airlines were more concerned about the operational costs (fuel and maintenance) of four engines, rather than the benefits of short-field performance.

In 1980, de Havilland responded by dropping the short-field performance requirement and adapting the basic Dash 7 layout to use only two, more powerful engines. Its favoured engine supplier, Pratt & Whitney Canada, developed the new PW100 series engines for the role, more than doubling the power from its PT6. Originally designated the PT7A-2R engine, it later became the PW120. When the Dash 8 rolled out on April 19, 1983, more than 3,800 hours of testing had been accumulated over two years on five PW100 series test engines. The Dash 8 first flight was on June 20, 1983.

Certification of the PW120 followed on December 16, 1983.

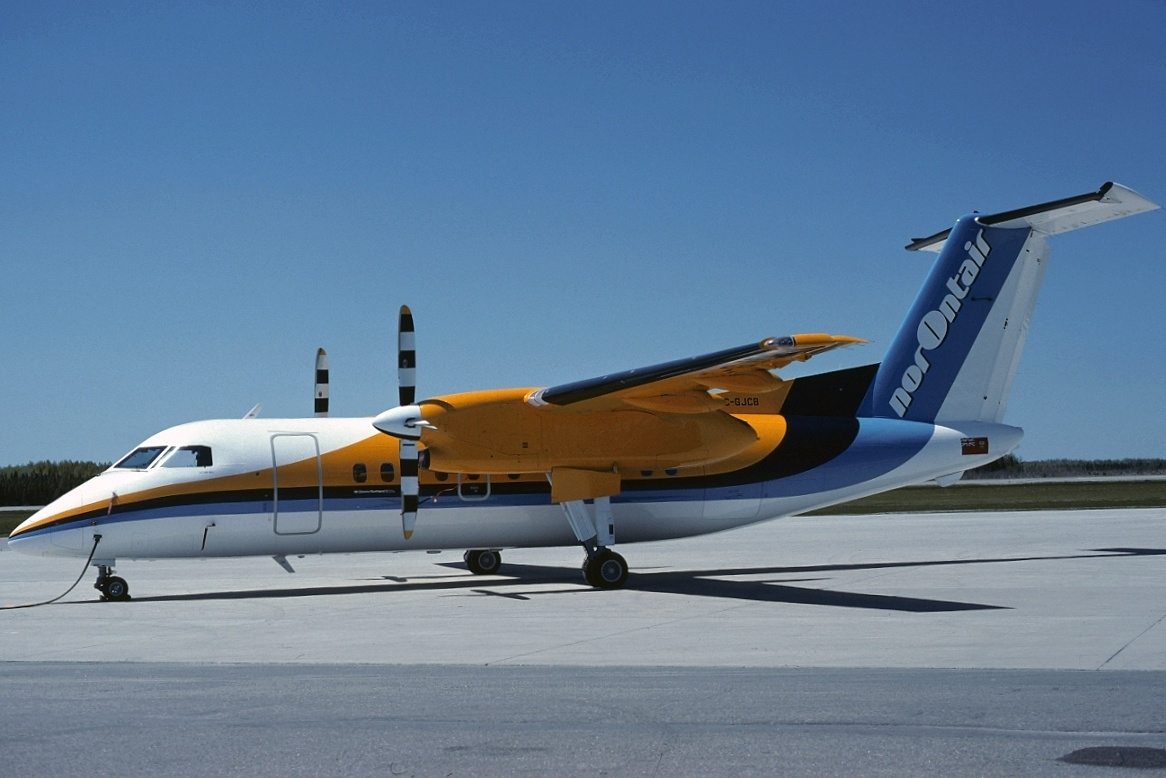
The first Dash 8 delivered, to NorOntair

The airliner entered service in 1984 with NorOntair, and Piedmont Airlines was the first US customer the same year.

=== DHC resale ===
In 1986, Boeing bought the company in a bid to improve production at DHC's Downsview Airport plants, believing the shared production in Canada would further strengthen their bargaining position with the Canadian government for a new Air Canada order for large intercontinental airliners. Air Canada was a crown corporation at the time, and both Boeing and Airbus were competing heavily via political channels for the contract. It was eventually won by Airbus, which received an order for 34 A320 aircraft. Allegations of secret commissions paid to Prime Minister of Canada Brian Mulroney are today known as the Airbus affair. Following its failure in the competition, Boeing immediately put de Havilland Canada up for sale. The company was eventually purchased by Bombardier in 1992.

=== Q-Series, -400 ===
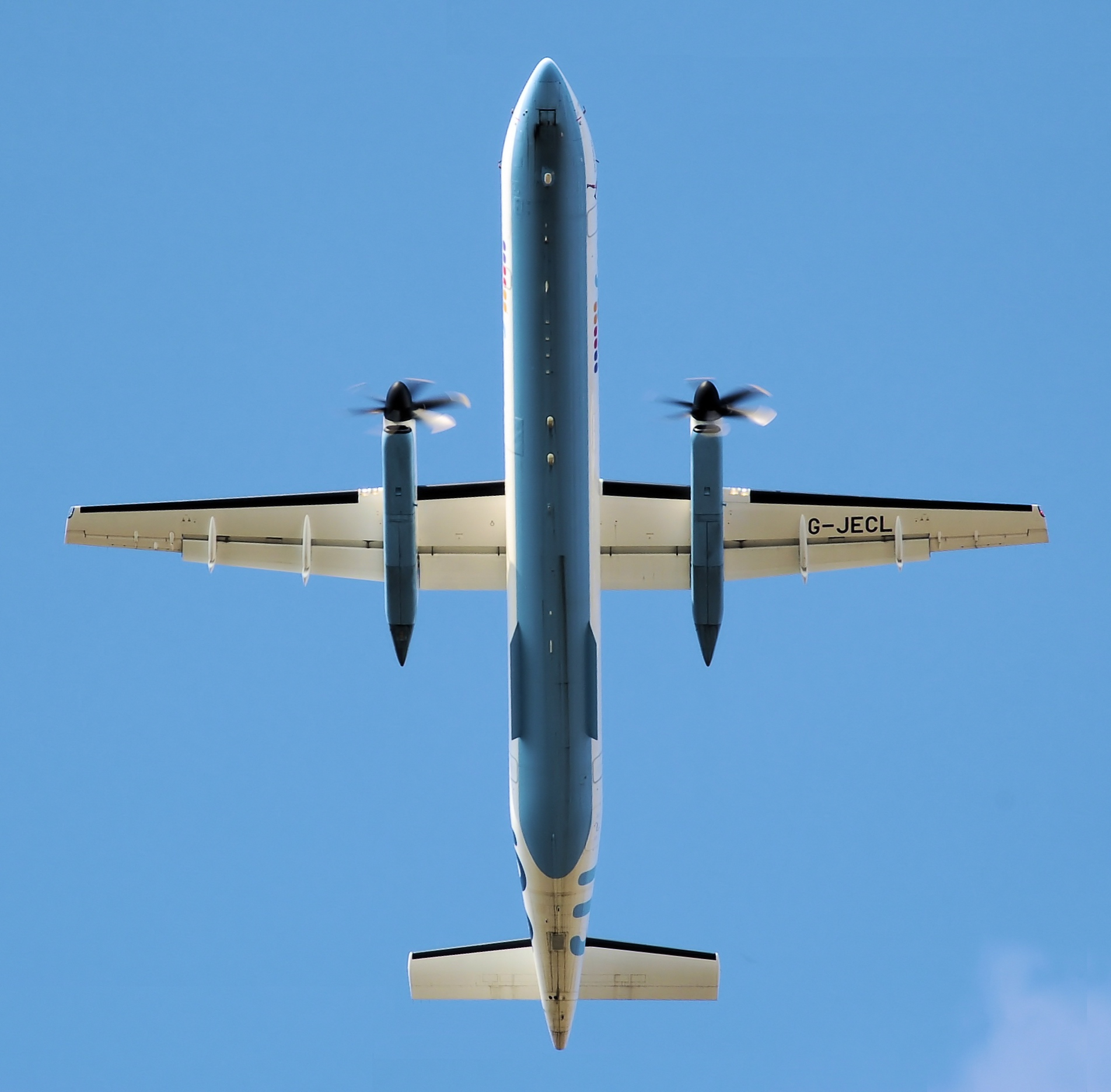
A Q400 planform view

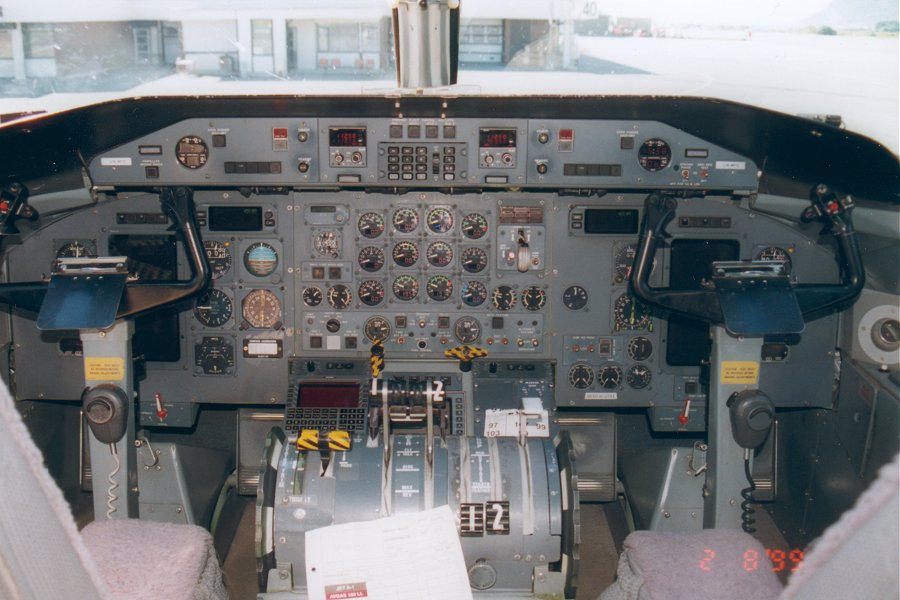
Early 300 cockpit

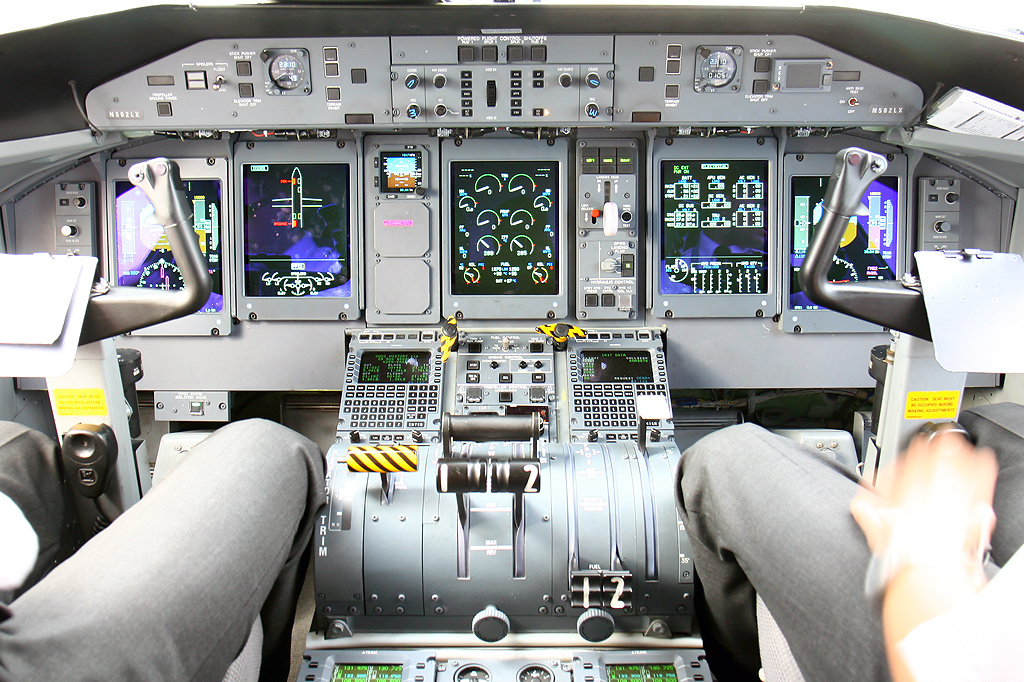
Modern Q400 cockpit

The market for new aircraft to replace existing turboprops once again grew in the mid-1990s, and DHC responded with the improved "Series 400" design.

All Dash 8s delivered from the second quarter of 1996 (including all Series 400s) include the Active Noise and Vibration System designed to reduce cabin noise and vibration levels to nearly those of jet airliners. To emphasize their quietness, Bombardier renamed the go-forward production of Dash 8 models as the "Q"-Series turboprops (Q200, Q300, and Q400).

The last Dash 8-100, a -102, was built in 2005.

In April 2008, Bombardier announced that production of the remaining classic versions (Series Q200 and Q300) would be ended, leaving the Series Q400 as the only Dash 8 still in production. Production of the Q200 and Q300 was to cease in May 2009.

A total of 672 Dash 8 classics were produced; the last one was delivered to Japan Coast Guard in August 2008.

Continuing on with the Q400, the 1,000th Dash 8 was delivered in November 2010.

=== Production ===
Bombardier aimed to produce the Q400 more economically. A deal with its machinists union in June 2017 allowed the assembly of the wings and cockpit section outside Canada and searches for potential partners commenced. Bombardier expected to produce the cockpit section in its plant in Queretaro, Mexico, outsourcing the wings to China's Shenyang Aircraft Corp, which already builds the Q400's centre fuselage. The Q400 components are chemically milled while older variants are assembled from bonded panels and skins.

The production of the Dash 8 Series 100 stopped in 2005, and that of the Series 200 and 300 in 2009.

=== Proposed Q400X stretch ===
Bombardier proposed the development of a Q400 stretch with two plug-in segments, called the Q400X project, in 2007. It would compete in the 90-seat market range. In response to this project, as of November 2007, ATR was studying a 90-seat stretch.

In June 2009, Bombardier commercial aircraft president Gary Scott indicated that the Q400X would be "definitely part of our future" for possible introduction in 2013–14, although he did not detail the size of the proposed version or commit to an introduction date.

In July 2010, Bombardier's vice president, Phillipe Poutissou, made comments explaining the company was still studying the prospects of designing the Q400X and talking with potential customers. At the time, Bombardier was not as committed to the Q400X as it had been previously. In May 2011, Bombardier was still strongly committed to the stretch but envisioned it more likely as a 2015 or later launch. The launch date was complicated by new powerplants from GE and PWC to be introduced in 2016. In February 2012, Bombardier was still studying the issue, at least a three-year delay was envisioned.

In October 2012, a joint development deal with a government-led South Korean consortium was revealed, to develop a 90-seater turboprop regional airliner, targeting a 2019 launch date. The consortium was to have included Korea Aerospace Industries and Korean Air Lines.

=== High-density, 90-seat Q400 ===
At the February 2016 Singapore Airshow, Bombardier announced a high-density, 90-seat layout of the Q400, which would enter service in 2018; keeping the 28 in (71 cm) seat pitch of the Nok Air 86-seats, an extra row of seats is allowed by changing the configuration of the front right door and moving back the aft pressure bulkhead. The payload is increased by 2,000 pounds (910 kg) and the aircraft maintenance check intervals are increased: 800 hours from 600 for an A-check and 8,000 hours from 6,000 for a C-check. By August 2018, the 90-seat variant was certified before delivery to launch customer SpiceJet later in the same year. In March 2021, EASA certified the 90-seat variant for European operations; DHC believed that there were opportunities with prospective European customers as of 2021.

=== Sale to Longview, reviving the De Havilland Canada name ===
On November 8, 2018, Canadian company Longview Aviation Capital Corporation, through its subsidiary Viking Air, acquired the entire Dash 8 program and the de Havilland brand from Bombardier, in a deal that would close by the second half of 2019. Viking had already acquired the discontinued de Havilland Canada aircraft model type certificates in 2006.

By November 2018, the sales of the higher-performance Q400 were slower than the cheaper aircraft from ATR. Bombardier announced the sale was for $300 million and expected $250 million net. The sale was projected by Bombardier to result in $250 million annual savings.

In January 2019, Longview announced that it would establish a new company in Ontario, reviving the de Havilland Aircraft Company of Canada name, to continue production of the Q400 and support the Dash 8 range. By February, the program sale was expected to close at the end of September.

On June 3, 2019, the sale was closed with the newly formed De Havilland Canada (DHC) taking control of the Dash 8 program, including servicing the previous -100, -200, and -300 series. Production of the Q400 was planned to continue at the Downsview, Toronto production facility, under DHC's management. De Havilland was considering a 50-seat shrink, as North American airlines operate 870 ageing 50-seaters, mostly CRJs and Embraer ERJs.

There were 17 Dash 8s scheduled for delivery in 2021, and De Havilland planned to pause production after those, while the factory lease expired in 2023.

On February 17, 2021, DHC announced a pause in production, planned for the second half of 2021, due to a lack of Dash 8 orders from airlines. The manufacturer planned to vacate its Downsview Toronto facility and lay off 500 employees in the process. The lay-off notice resulted in Unifor, the union representing the workers, demanding a government bail-out. The company planned to restart production after the pandemic at a new location.

In July 2022, DHC announced that it would review the Dash 8 programme and supply chain later in the year, and could restart production in the middle of the decade if conditions allowed. The Calgary site, where the company produced DHC-6 Twin Otters, was originally envisioned as the venue for Dash 8 production.

Per a property transaction made by Bombardier prior to the 2019 sale to DHC, DHC decommissioned its Downsview, Toronto, manufacturing facility in August 2022, and in 2023 confirmed its plans to restart Dash 8 production in Wheatland County, Alberta, outside of Calgary, by 2033.

At the Farnborough International Airshow in July 2024, DHC announced orders for seven Series 400 aircraft, including one for Skyward Express, two for Widerøe, and one for the Tanzania Government Flight Agency. The company also announced the launch of a factory refurbishment programme, for which 28 aircraft had been purchased, along with new freighter and combi aircraft conversion kits; one of the latter had been ordered by Advantage Air, DHC said.

=== Hydrogen-electric powertrain ===
In December 2021, DHC entered into a partnership with ZeroAvia with a view to offering the ZA-2000 hydrogen-electric propulsion as an option for the DHC-8, as a line-fit option for new aircraft and as an approved retrofit for existing aircraft. In May 2023, ZeroAvia unveiled a DHC-8 Q400 donated by Alaska Airlines for use as a testbed aircraft.

== Design ==
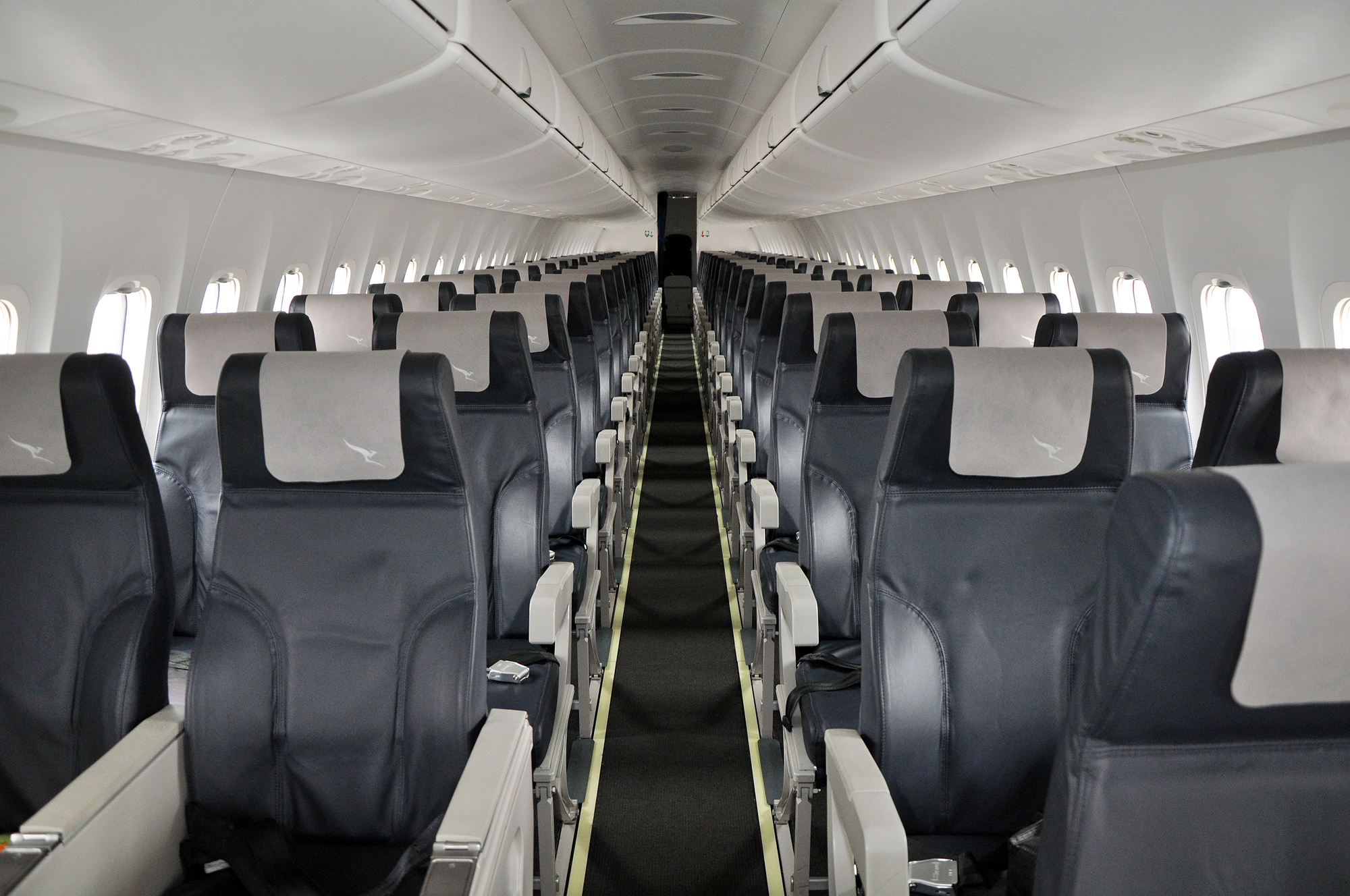
Four-abreast, 2–2 cabin

Distinguishing features of the Dash 8 design are the large T-tail intended to keep the tail free of prop wash during takeoff, a very high aspect ratio wing (around 12:1), the elongated engine nacelles also holding the rearward-folding landing gear, and the pointed nose profile.

The Dash 8 design has better cruise performance than the Dash 7, is less expensive to operate, and is much less expensive to maintain, due largely to having only two engines. It is a little noisier than the Dash 7 and cannot match the STOL performance of its earlier DHC forebears, although it is still able to operate from small airports with runways 3,000 ft (910 m) long, compared to the 2,200 ft (670 m) required by a fully laden Dash 7.

=== Regional jet competition ===
The introduction of the regional jet altered the sales picture. Although more expensive than turboprops, regional jets allow airlines to operate passenger services on routes not suitable for turboprops. Turboprop aircraft have lower fuel consumption and can operate from shorter runways than regional jets, but have higher engine maintenance costs, shorter ranges, and lower cruising speeds.

When world oil prices drove up short-haul airfares in 2006, an increasing number of airlines that had bought regional jets began to reassess turboprop regional airliners, which use about 30–60% less fuel than regional jets. Although the market was not as robust as in the 1980s when the first Dash 8s were introduced, 2007 had increased sales of the only two 40+ seat regional turboprops still in western production, Bombardier's Q400 and its competitor, the ATR series of 50– to 70-seat turboprops. The Q400 has a cruising speed close to that of most regional jets, and its mature engines and systems require less frequent maintenance, reducing its disadvantage.

== Variants ==
The aircraft has been delivered in four series. The Series 100 has a maximum capacity of 39, the Series 200 has the same capacity but offers more powerful engines, the Series 300 is a stretched, 50-seat version, and the Series 400 is further stretched to a maximum of 90 passengers. Models delivered after 1997 have cabin noise suppression and are designated with the prefix "Q". Production of the Series 100 ceased in 2005, followed by the 200 and 300 in 2009, leaving the Q400 as the only series still in production.

=== Series 100 ===
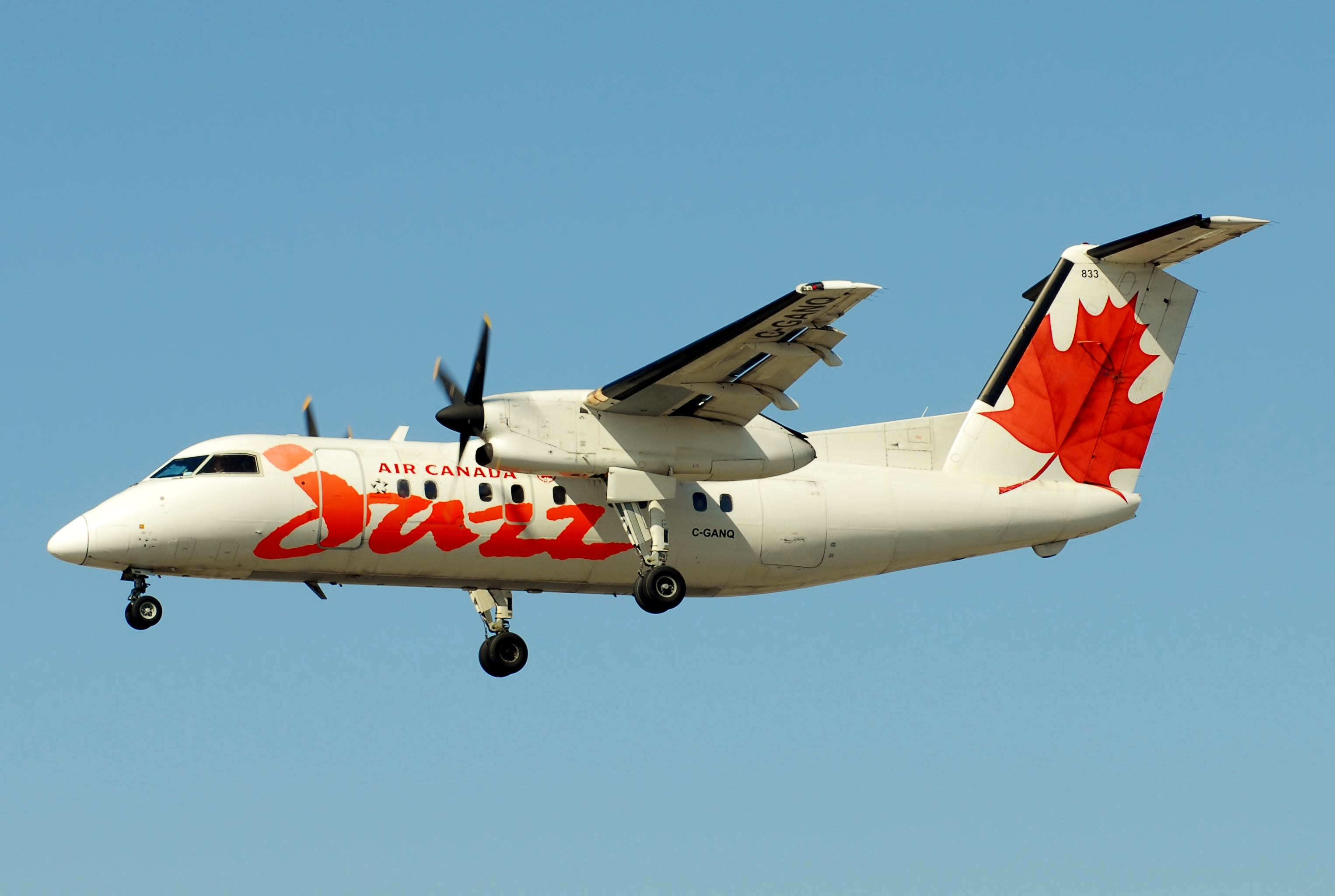
The -100/200 series have the shortest fuselage

The Series 100 was the original 37-39 passenger version of the Dash 8 that entered service in 1984. The original engine was the Pratt & Whitney Canada PW120 and later units used the PW121. Rated engine power is 1,800 shp (1,340 kW).

DHC-8-101
1984 variant powered by either two PW120 or PW120A engines and a 33,000 lb (15,000 kg) takeoff weight.
DHC-8-102
1986 variant powered by either two PW120A or PW121 engines and a 34,500 lb (15,650 kg) takeoff weight.
DHC-8-103
1987 variant powered by two PW121 engines and a 34,500 lb (15,650 kg) takeoff weight (can be modified for a 35,200 lb [15,950 kg] take-off weight).
DHC-8-102A
1990 variant powered by two PW120A engines with revised Heath Tecna interior.
DHC-8-106
1992 variant powered by two PW121 engines and a 36,300 lb (16,450 kg) takeoff weight.
DHC-8-100PF
DHC-8-100 converted to a freighter by Voyageur Aviation, with a 10,000 lb (4,536 kg) cargo capacity.
DHC-8M-100
Two aircraft for Maritime Pollution Surveillance, operated by Transport Canada, equipped with the MSS 6000 Surveillance system.
CC-142
Military transport version for the Canadian Forces in Europe.
CT-142
Military navigation training version for the Canadian Forces. Used to train Canadian and allied nations' ACSOs and AESOPs

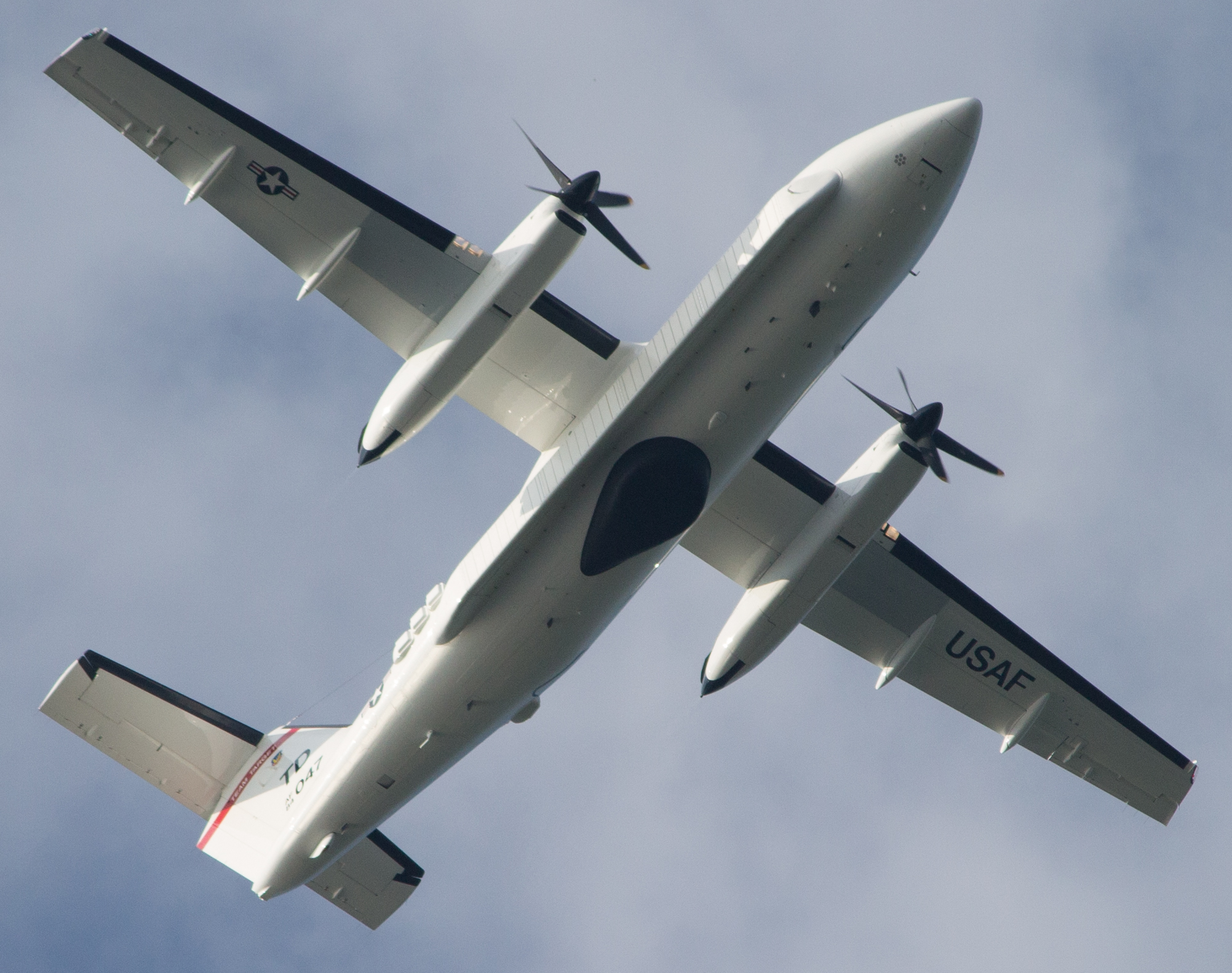
E-9A Widget with aerials underside

E-9A Widget
A United States Air Force range control aircraft that ensures that the overwater military ranges in the Gulf of Mexico are clear of civilian boats and aircraft during live fire tests of air-launched missiles and other hazardous military activities. The E-9A Widget is equipped with AN/APS-143(V)-1 radar that can detect an object in the water as small as a person in a life raft, from up to 25 mi (40 km) away. Aircraft operate out of Tyndall Air Force Base, Florida, with two aircraft assigned to the 82nd Aerial Targets Squadron for the support of training missions.

=== Series 200 ===
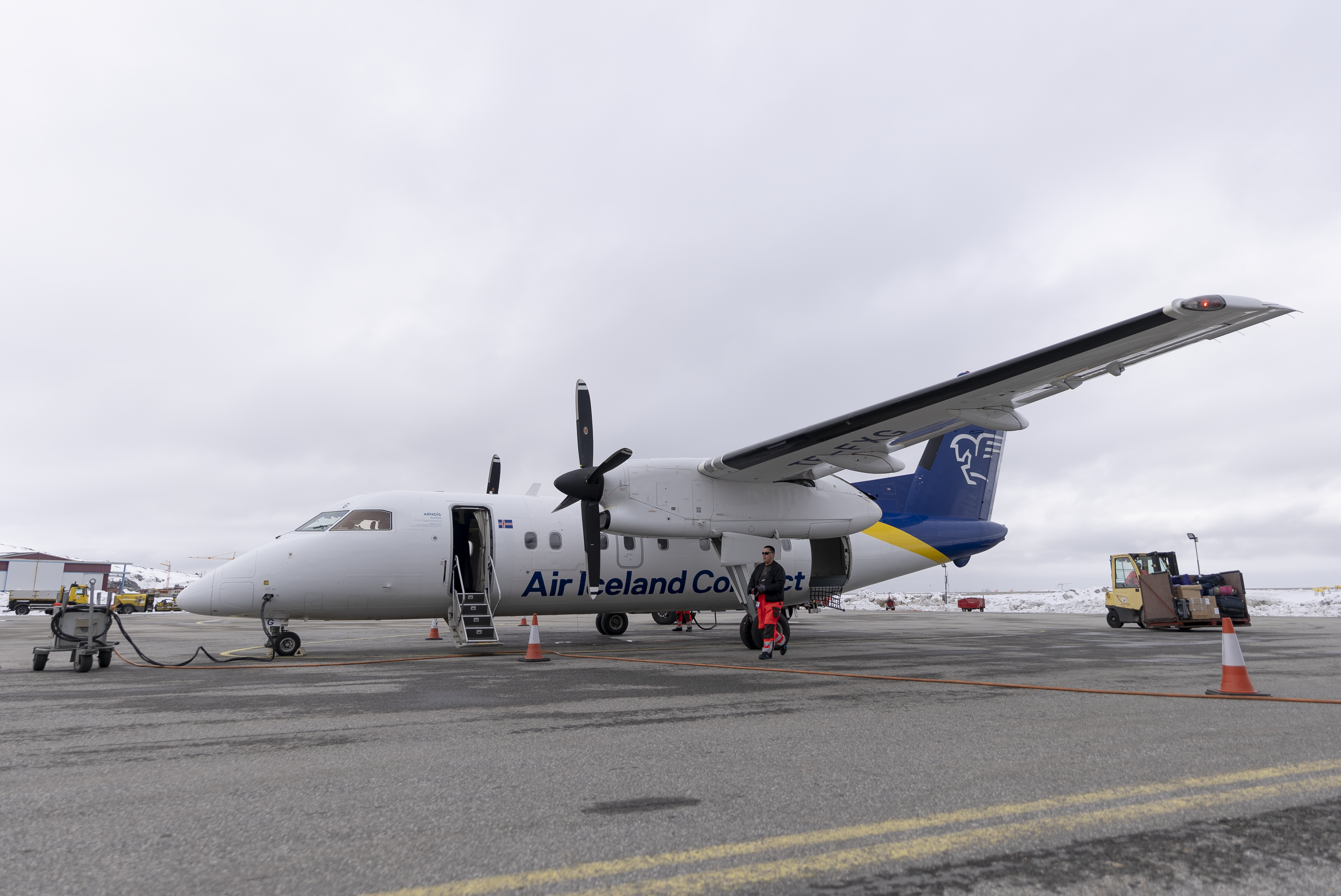
The -200 airframe is the same as -100 airframe

The Series 200 aircraft maintained the same 37–39 passenger airframe as the original Series 100, but was re-engined for improved performance. The Series 200 used the more powerful Pratt & Whitney Canada PW123 engines rated at 2,150 shp (1,600 kW).

DHC-8-201
1995 variant powered by two PW123C engines.
DHC-8-202
1995 variant powered by two PW123D engines.
Q200
Version of the DHC-8-200 with the ANVS (Active Noise and Vibration Suppression) system.

In 2000, its unit cost was US$12 million.

=== Series 300 ===
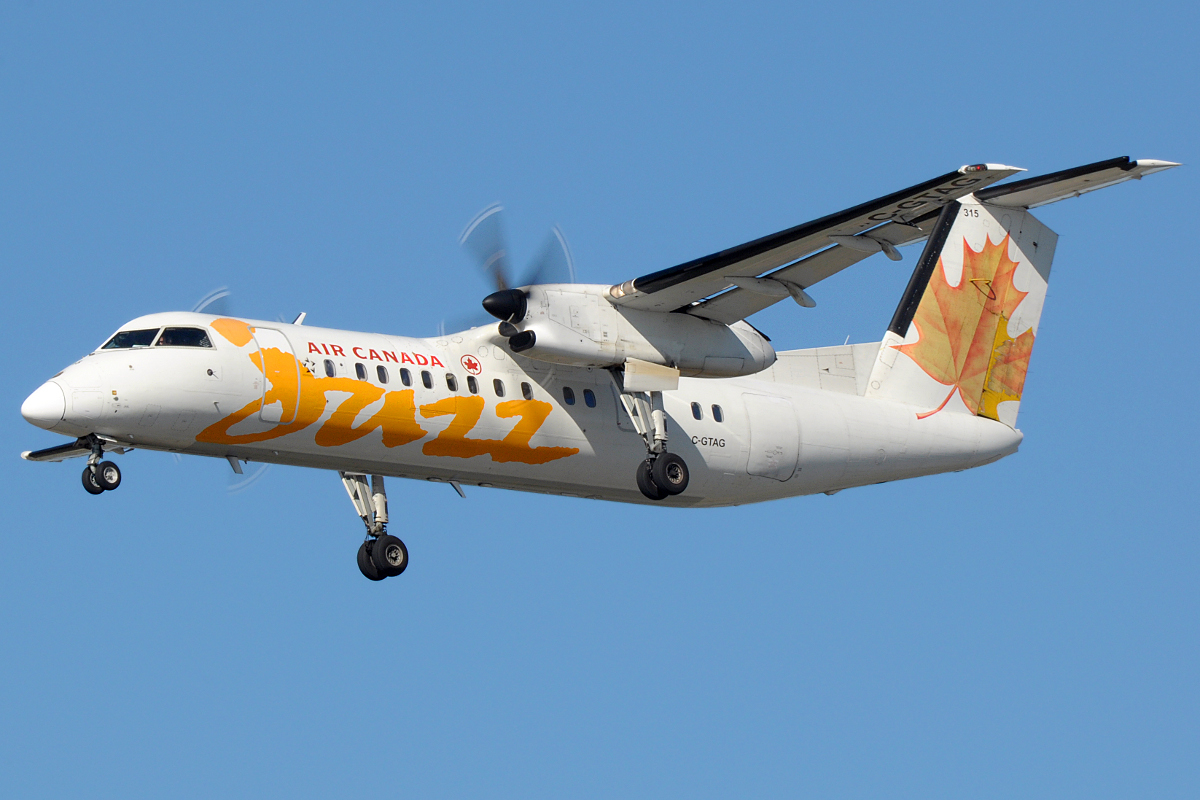
The -300 has a fuselage 3.43 m (11.3 ft) longer than the -100/200

The Series 300 introduced a longer airframe that was stretched 3.43 metres (11.3 ft) over the Series 100/200 and has a passenger capacity of 50–56. The Series 300 also used the Pratt & Whitney Canada PW123 engines. Rated engine power is between 2,380 shp (1,774 kW) and 2,500 shp (1,864 kW). Design service life is 80,000 flight cycles. Under an extended service program launched in 2017, the service life of Dash 8-300 is extended by 50 percent, or approximately 15 years, to 120,000 flight cycles.

DHC-8-301
1989 variant powered by two PW123 engines.
DHC-8-311
1990 variant powered by two PW123A engines with revised Heath Tecna interior. In addition, the landing gear design changed to a slightly swept-back design intended to prevent tail strikes.
DHC-8-314
1992 variant powered by two PW123B engines.
DHC-8-315
1995 variant powered by two PW123E engines.
DHC-8-300A
Version of the DHC-8-300 with increased payload.
Q300
Version of the DHC-8-300 with the ANVS (Active Noise and Vibration Suppression) system.
DHC-8-300 MSA
Upgraded variant with L-3 for maritime surveillance platform.
DHC-8-315 ISA
Upgraded variant for the Home Office as a maritime patrol and surveillance platform.

RO-6A Saturn Arch

RO-6A Saturn Arch
United States military designation for the DHC-8-315 for the United States Army as a reconnaissance platform.
C-147A
United States military designation for the DHC-8-315 for the United States Army as a jump platform. In 2000, its unit cost was US$14.3 million.

=== Series 400 ===
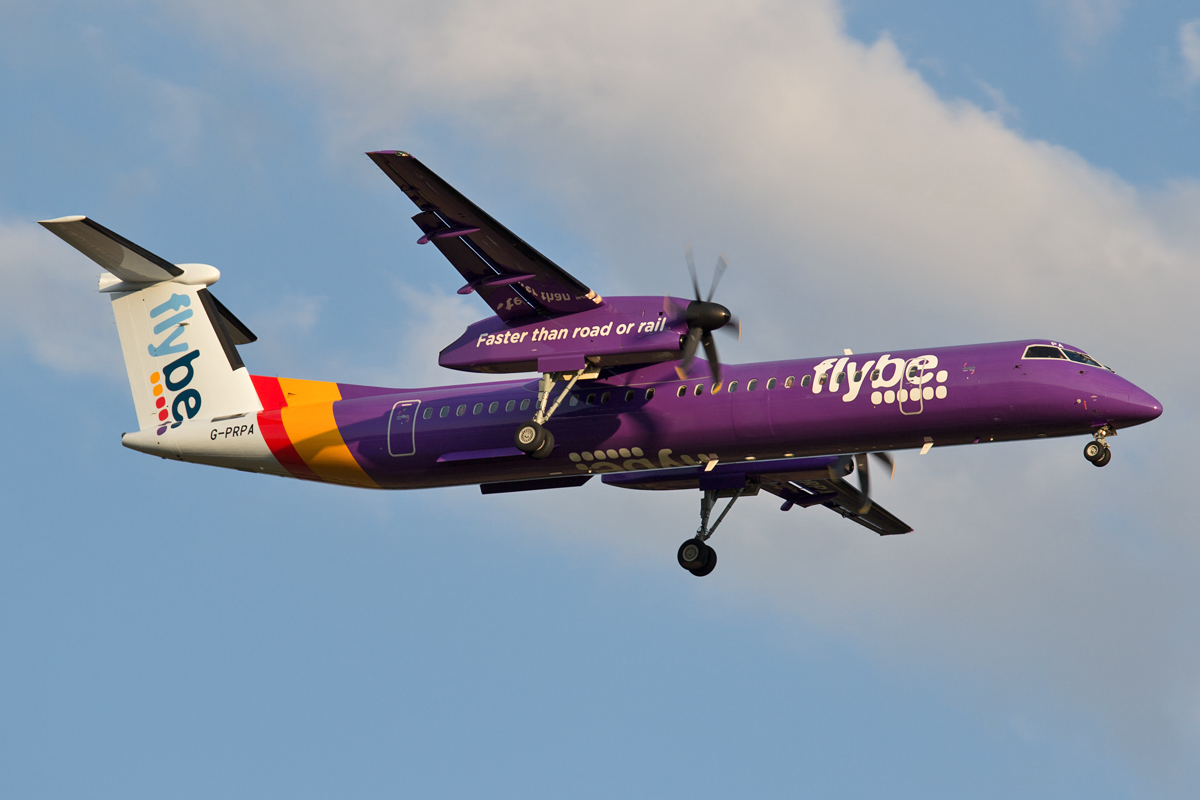
A Flybe Q400. The airline was in 2014 the largest operator of the type.

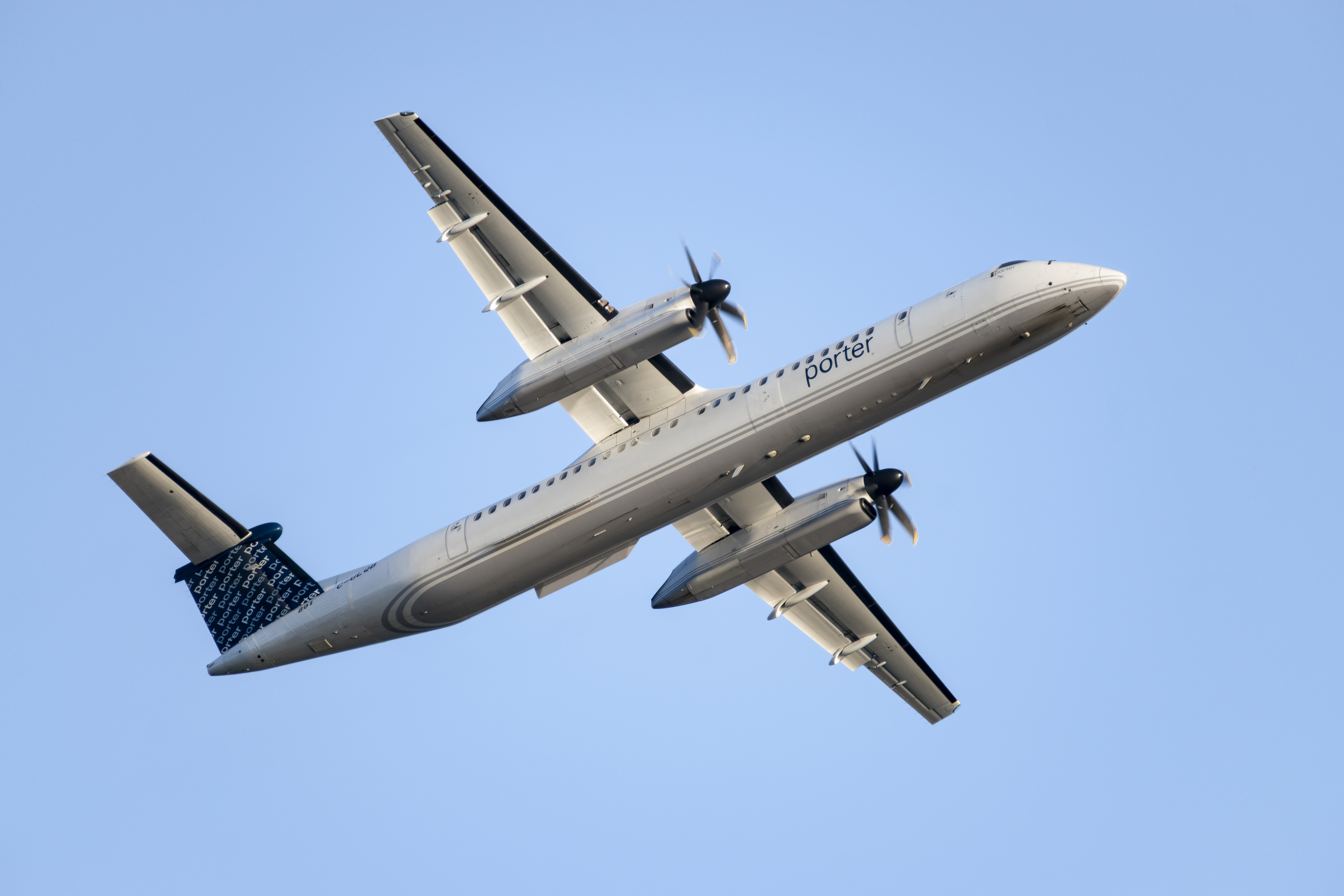
Q400 of Porter Airlines

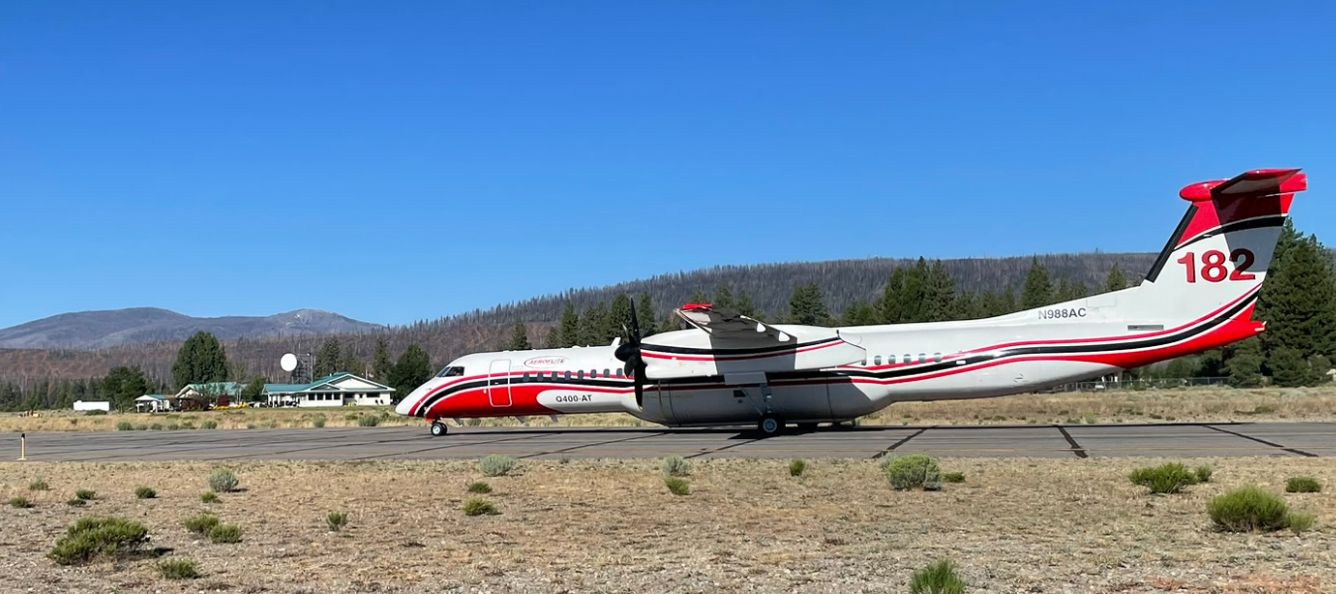
Q400AT firefighting model belonging to Aeroflite

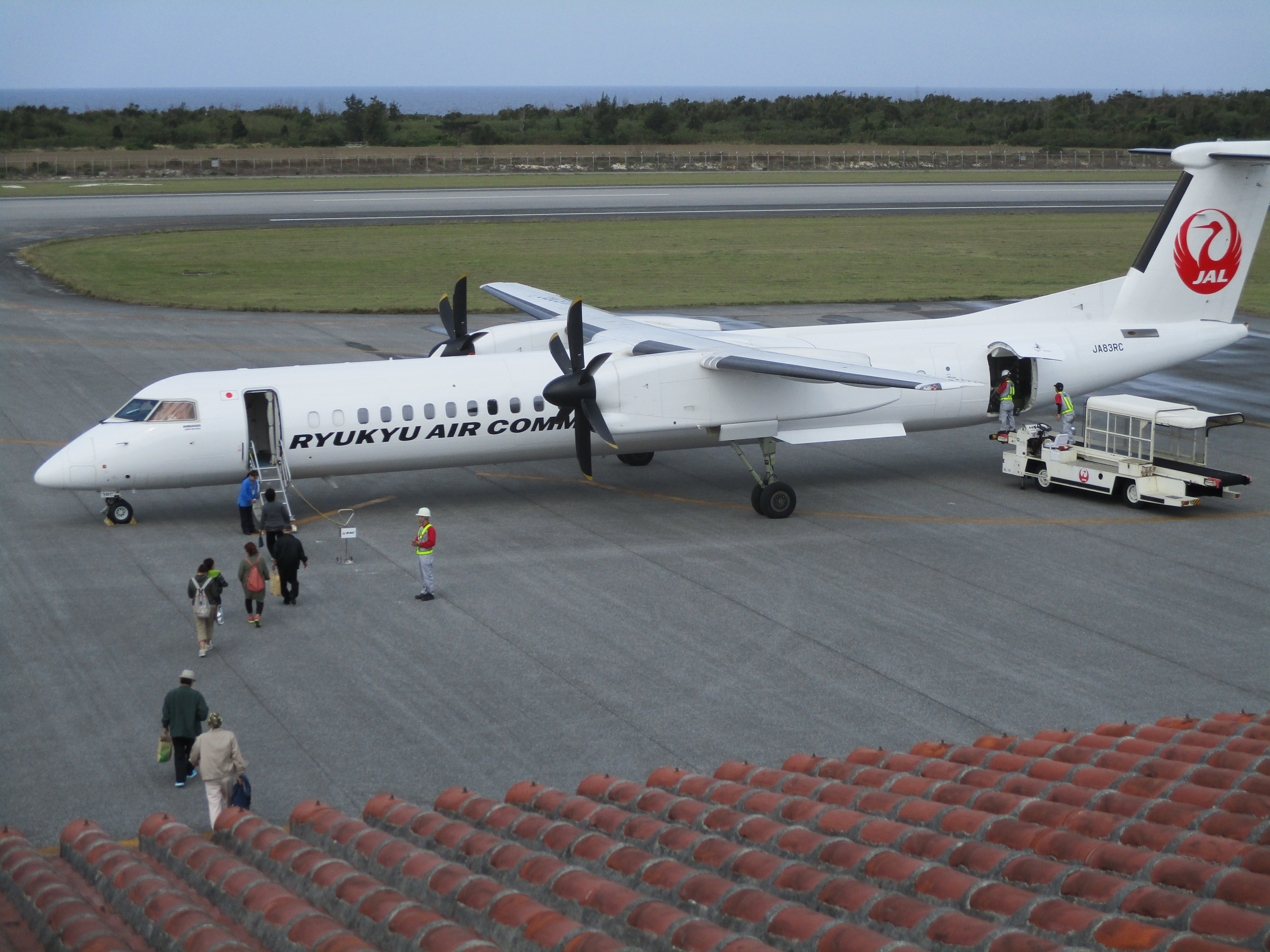
Q400CC (Ryukyu Air Commuter)

The Series 400 introduced an even longer airframe that was stretched 6.83 metres (22.4 ft) over the Series 300 (10.26 metres (33.7 ft) over the Series 100/200), had slightly more wing span due to a larger wing section inboard of the engines, a stouter T-tail and had a passenger capacity of 68–90. The Series 400 uses Pratt & Whitney Canada PW150A engines rated at 4,850 shp (3,620 kW). The aircraft has a cruise speed of 360 knots (667 km/h), which is 60–90 knots (111–166 km/h) higher than its predecessors. The maximum operating altitude is 25,000 ft (7,600 m) for the standard version, although a version with drop-down oxygen masks is offered, which increases maximum operating altitude to 27,000 ft (8,200 m).

Between its service entry in 2000 and the 2018 sale to Longview/Viking, 585 had been delivered at a rate of 30–35 per year, leaving a backlog of 65 at the time of the 2018 sale.

DHC-8-400
1999 variant with a maximum of 68 passengers.
DHC-8-401
1999 variant with a maximum of 70 passengers.
DHC-8-402
1999 variant with a maximum of 78 passengers.
Q400
Stretched and improved 70–78 passenger version that entered service in 2000. All Q400s include the ANVS (Active Noise and Vibration Suppression) system.
Q400NextGen
Version of the Q400 with updated cabins, lighting, windows, overhead bins, landing gear, as well as reduced fuel and maintenance costs.
In 2013, an Extra Capacity variant was introduced, capable of carrying a maximum of 86 passengers. The Extra Capacity variant was updated in 2016 with more closely spaced seats to carry up to 90 passengers. The first 90-seat aircraft was delivered to launch customer SpiceJet in September 2018.
Q400-MR (now Q400AT)
Over sixteen Q400 aircraft have been adapted to the aerial firefighting role as an airtanker. This aircraft is also called the Dash 8-400AT (airtanker only) or Dash 8-400MRE (multi-role airtanker). The French Sécurité Civile operate eight multi-role airtankers, while Conair Group is currently operating a fleet of airtanker-only variants in Canada, the US, Australia and France. Conair manufactures the airtanker-only variant from their hangars in Abbotsford, Canada. This tanker can carry 2642 US gallons or 10,000 litres of retardant, foam or water and travel at 340 knots (630 km/h).
DHC-8 MPA-D8
2007 converted for use as a maritime patrol aircraft. PAL Aerospace partnered to offer this variant as DHC-8 MPA P4.
DHC-8-402PF
2008 converted pallet freighter variant with a payload of 9,000 kg (20,000 lb).
Q400CC
Cargo combi. Seats 50 passengers plus 3,720 kg (8,200 lb) of payload. First delivered to launch customer Ryukyu Air Commuter in 2015.

In 2017, its unit cost was US$32.2 million.

== Operators ==
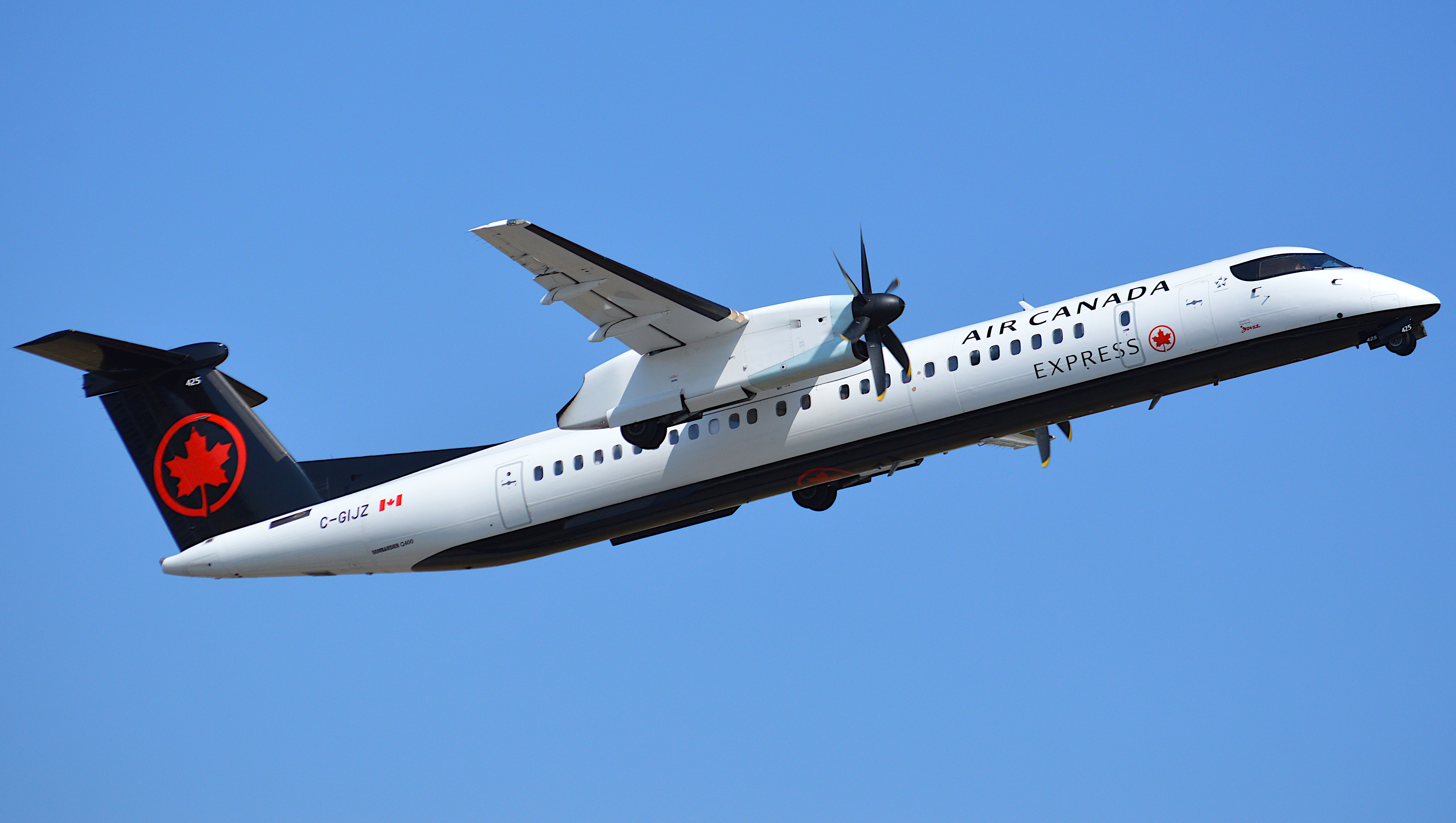
Air Canada Express Q400

By 2017, the Q400 aircraft had logged 7 million flight hours with 60 operators and transported over 400 million passengers with a dispatch reliability over 99.5%.

By July 2018, 844 Dash 8s were in airline service: 143 Series 100 with 35 operators, 42 Series 200 with 16 operators, 151 Series 300 with 32 operators and 508 Q400s. By then, 56 orders were in backlog.

== Orders and deliveries ==
As of March 31, 2019
Model Series	Orders	Deliveries	Unfilled
Series 100	299	299	–
Series 200	105	105	–
Series 300	267	267	–
Series 400	645	587	58
Total	1,316	1,258	58

== Accidents and incidents ==
The DHC-8 has been involved in 80 aviation accidents and incidents including 31 hull losses. Those resulted in 180 fatalities.

=== Accidents with fatalities ===
Accidents with fatalities
Date	Type	Flight	Fat.	Surv.	Location	Circumstances
November 21, 1990	-100	Bangkok Airways Flight 125	38	0	Koh Samui, Thailand	Crashed while attempting to land in heavy rain and high winds.
January 6, 1993	-300	Lufthansa CityLine Flight 5634	4	19	Paris Charles de Gaulle Airport, France	Crashed short of the runway.
June 9, 1995	-100	Ansett New Zealand Flight 703	4	17	Near Palmerston North Airport, New Zealand	Crashed on the western slopes of the Tararua Ranges due to pilot error while rectifying a landing gear malfunction.
February 12, 2009	-400	Colgan Air Flight 3407	49 + 1	0	Clarence Center, New York, United States	While approaching Buffalo Niagara Airport, the aircraft stalled and crashed into a house due to pilot error. One person on the ground died.
October 13, 2011	-100	Airlines PNG Flight 1600	28	4	Near Madang Airport, Papua New Guinea	Crashed due to the pilots' accidental selection of "ground beta" that caused the propellers to overspeed, leading to a complete loss of engine power. Ground beta lockout installation mandated in aftermath.
October 5, 2013	-200	USAF patrol flight	4	2	Near Acandí, Colombia	A military surveillance plane crashed while being operated on a maritime counter-drug patrol mission.
March 12, 2018	-400	US-Bangla Airlines Flight 211	51	20	Kathmandu Airport, Nepal	Crashed on landing due to pilot error. Deadliest Dash 8 crash to date.
August 10, 2018	-400	2018 Horizon Air Bombardier Q400 incident	1	0	Ketron Island, Washington, United States	No passengers on board; stolen from Seattle–Tacoma Airport by a ground employee who deliberately crashed, killing only himself.
January 2, 2024	-300	2024 Haneda Airport runway collision	5	1	Tokyo Haneda Airport, Japan	After miscommunication with air traffic control, the Japanese Coast Guard aircraft collided on the runway with Japan Airlines Flight 516, an Airbus A350 that was landing.
March 5, 2024	-300	Safarilink Aviation Flight 053	0 + 2	44	Nairobi National Park, Kenya	Collided on climbout from Wilson Airport with a local Cessna 172 training flight. Under investigation as of March 2024.

=== Hull losses ===
- April 15, 1988: Horizon Air Flight 2658, operated by DHC-8-102 N819PH suffered an engine fire on climb-out from Seattle/Tacoma International Airport. An emergency landing was made but the aircraft struck equipment on the ground before crashing into two jetways. N819PH was destroyed by fire; there were no fatalities.
- November 23, 2009: a DHC-8-200, being operated on behalf of United States Africa Command, made an emergency landing at Tarakigné, Mali, and was substantially damaged when the undercarriage collapsed and the starboard wing was ripped off. The accident was caused by the aircraft running out of fuel 29 seconds before the crash. The captain had opted not to refuel at the previous departure airport.
- April 9, 2012: Air Tanzania Dash 8 (registration 5H-MWG) was written off at Kigoma Airport, Tanzania, in an aborted take off. All 39 people on board survived.
- January 29, 2014: Air Greenland Flight 3205 went down into a cliff after suffering from runway excursion due to landing gear collapse, injuring 4 of the 15 on board.
- September 30, 2015: Luxair Flight 9562 experienced an aborted takeoff accident at Saarbrücken Airport in Germany. The Bombardier Q400 LX-LGH was damaged beyond repair when it settled back onto the runway after the gear was raised prematurely. The aircraft slid 2,400 feet and came to a stop with more than 1,100 feet remaining of the 6,562-foot paved runway. None of the 20 occupants were injured.
- May 8, 2019: Biman Bangladesh Airlines Flight 60, a Dash-8 Q400 slid off Runway 21 at Yangon International Airport, Burma, and broke into three pieces as it performed a go-around on landing. The flight originated in Dhaka, Bangladesh. Poor weather was cited as a contributing factor. At least 17 people were injured.

=== Major landing gear accidents ===
==== Accidents in 2007 ====
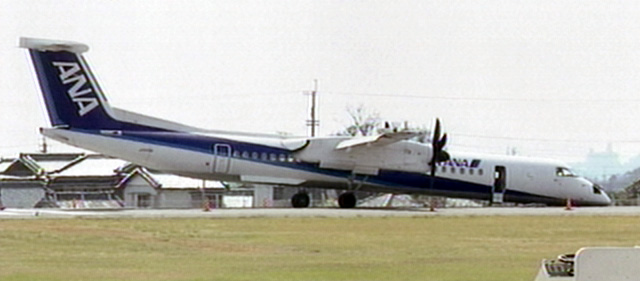
An All Nippon Airways Dash-8 after landing at Kōchi Ryōma Airport on March 13, 2007, when the front landing gear failed to extend

In September 2007, two separate accidents of similar landing gear failures occurred within four days of each other on Scandinavian Airlines (SAS) Dash 8-Q400 aircraft. A third accident occurred in October 2007, leading to the withdrawal of the type from the airline's fleet.

On September 9, 2007, the crew of SAS Flight 1209, en route from Copenhagen to Aalborg, reported problems with the locking mechanism of the right side landing gear, and Aalborg Airport was prepared for an emergency landing. Shortly after touchdown, the right main gear collapsed and the airliner skidded off the runway while fragments of the right propeller shot against the cabin, and the right engine caught fire. Of 69 passengers and four crew on board, 11 were sent to hospital, five with minor injuries. The accident was filmed by a local news channel (TV2-Nord) and broadcast live on national television.

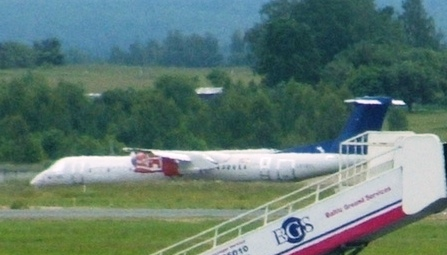
SAS Dash 8 (LN-RDS) after crash-landing at Vilnius airport

Three days later, on September 12, 2007, Scandinavian Airlines Flight 2748 from Copenhagen to Palanga had a similar problem with the landing gear, forcing the aircraft to land in Vilnius International Airport (Lithuania). No passengers or crew were injured. Immediately after this accident SAS grounded all 33 Q400 airliners in its fleet and, a few hours later, Bombardier recommended that all Q400s with more than 10,000 flights be grounded until further notice. This affected about 60 aircraft, out of 140 Q400s then in service.

On October 27, 2007, Scandinavian Airlines Flight 2867 en route from Bergen to Copenhagen had severe problems with the landing gear during landing in Kastrup Airport. The right wing gear did not deploy properly (or partially), and the aircraft skidded off the runway in a controlled emergency landing. The Q400 was carrying 38 passengers, two infants, and four crew members on board. No injuries were reported. The next day, SAS permanently removed its entire Dash 8 Q400 fleet from service. In a press release on October 28, 2007, the company's president said: "Confidence in the Q400 has diminished considerably and our customers are becoming increasingly doubtful about flying in this type of aircraft. Accordingly, with the Board of Directors' approval, I have decided to immediately remove Dash 8 Q400 aircraft from service." The preliminary Danish investigation determined the latest Q400 incident was unrelated to the airline's earlier corrosion problems, in this particular case caused by a misplaced O-ring found blocking the orifice in the restrictor valve.

In all, eight Q400s had landing gear failures while landing during 2007: four in Denmark, one in Germany, one in Japan, one in Lithuania, and one in South Korea. In November 2007, it was revealed that the Swedish Civil Aviation Administration had begun an investigation and found Scandinavian Airlines System culpable of cutting corners in its maintenance department. The airline reportedly made 2,300 flights in which safety equipment was not up to standard. On March 10, 2008, SAS ordered 27 more aircraft from Bombardier in a compensation deal: 14 Q400 NextGen turboprops and 13 CRJ900 jets.

==== Other landing gear accidents ====
On February 23, 2017, a Flybe Q400 suffered a right hand gear collapse while landing at Amsterdam Schiphol Airport. There were no injuries. The cause was identified as a deformed righthand main landing gear brace, which had been installed the night before. It is not known when the deformation had occurred.

On November 10, 2017, Flybe Flight 331, operated by a Q400, was scheduled to fly from George Best Belfast City Airport to Inverness Airport. The plane reported a technical problem shortly after takeoff and was diverted to Belfast International Airport, where it landed on its nose with the front gear retracted. One minor injury was reported.

On August 19, 2018, a Q400-200 of LC Perú on a flight from Lima to Ayacucho had to return to Lima airport and make an emergency landing due to a nose gear that could not be lowered. The aircraft landed without the nose gear down.

On November 15, 2018, a Q300-315 belonging to PAL Airlines was unable to lower its nose gear while trying to land at Deer Lake, Newfoundland, and diverted to Stephenville, Newfoundland, performing a nose gear up landing.

On January 18, 2024, the left main landing gear on a Q400 belonging to Ethiopian Airlines collapsed on landing at Mekelle Airport.

On December 28, 2024, A PAL Airlines Q400 operating as Air Canada Express Flight 2259 from St. Johns, Newfoundland to Halifax, Nova Scotia, suffered a collapse of its left main landing gear and caught fire while landing at Halifax International Airport.

=== Propeller overspeed incidents ===
On October 13, 2011, Airlines PNG Flight 1600, Dash 8-103 P2-MCJ, was on approach to Madang Airport when the first officer accidentally pulled the power levers through the flight idle setting and into the beta setting while trying to reduce airspeed. In beta, which is intended for ground operations and slowing the aircraft after landing, the variable-pitch props transition to flat pitch. High-speed airflow through the improperly configured props caused them to overspeed and drive the engines, which caused engine damage and a total loss of engine power. The aircraft crashed during the ensuing off-airport forced landing attempt; both pilots, the flight attendant, and a single passenger survived with injuries, while the other 28 passengers died.

The Papua New Guinea Accident Investigation Commission (AIC) found that the pilots made several other serious errors, including failing to lower the landing gear and flaps, which would have slowed the aircraft and reduced the severity of the crash; however, the AIC primarily attributed the accident to the fact that beta actuation was possible in flight, coupled with inadequate training for flight crews to recognize and correct it. A beta lockout feature was an option for the Dash 8, but it had not been installed in P2-MCJ, and the beta warning horn had been inoperative.

On December 6, 2011, QantasLink Dash 8-315 VH-SBV, on a scheduled passenger flight to Weipa Airport, encountered turbulence while the first officer's hand was resting on the power levers. The first officer inadvertently placed the levers in beta and the propellers began to overspeed. The beta warning horn sounded, initially confusing the pilots, but the horn together with the audible increase in propeller speed prompted them to quickly diagnose the problem and place the power levers back in flight idle before engine damage occurred. The flight landed safely without further incident.

While investigating these events, the AIC and the Australian Transport Safety Bureau (ATSB) determined that a number of similar inadvertent in-flight beta actuations had occurred in the Dash 8, and recommended steps be taken to prevent it, including more thorough pilot training. In 2012, in cooperation with the AIC and ATSB, Transport Canada issued an airworthiness directive (AD) mandating the installation of beta lockout on all Dash 8 aircraft that did not have it, a second AD mandating more frequent testing of the beta warning horn, and a service bulletin requiring a cockpit placard to warn pilots not to move the power levers below the flight idle setting while airborne.

== Specifications ==
Model	Q200(-100)	Q300	Q400
Cockpit crew	Two		
Passengers, typical	37	50@30–33"	82@30"
Max capacity	40	56	90@28"
Length	73 ft (22.25 m)	84 ft 3 in (25.7 m)	107 ft 9 in (32.8 m)
Height	24 ft 7 in (7.49 m)		27 ft 5 in (8.4 m)
Wingspan	85 ft (25.89 m)	90 ft (27.4 m)	93 ft 3 in (28.4 m)
Wing area	585 sq ft (54.4 m^{2})	605 sq ft (56.2 m^{2})	689 sq ft (64 m^{2})
Aspect ratio	12.32	13.36	12.6
Width	Fuselage 8 ft 10 in (2.69 m), cabin 8 ft 3 in (2.52 m)		
Cabin length	30 ft 1 in (9.16 m)	41 ft 6 in (12.60 m)	61 ft 8 in (18.80 m)
Max takeoff weight	36,300 lb (16,466 kg) -100: 34,500 lb (15,600 kg)	43,000 lb (19,505 kg)	67,200 lb (30,481 kg)
Operating empty	23,098 lb (10,477 kg)	26,000 lb (11,793 kg)	39,284 lb (17,819 kg)
Max payload	8,921 lb (4,047 kg)	13,500 lb (6,124 kg)	18,716 lb (8,489 kg)
Max fuel	835 U.S. gal (3,160 L)		1,724 U.S. gal (6,526 L)
Engines (2×)	PW123C/D -100: PW120	PW123/B/E	PW150
Unit power	2,150 hp (1,600 kW) -100: 1,800 hp (1,300 kW)	2,380–2,500 hp (1,770–1,860 kW)	5,071 hp (3,781 kW)
High speed cruise	289 kn (535 km/h; 333 mph) -100: 270 kn (500 km/h; 310 mph)	287 kn (532 km/h; 333 mph)	300–360 kn (556–667 km/h; 350–410 mph)
Ceiling	25,000 ft (7,620 m)		27,000 ft (8,229 m)
Range	1,125 nmi (2,084 km; 1,295 mi) -100: 1,020 nmi (1,889 km; 1,174 mi)	924 nmi (1,711 km; 1,063 mi)	1,100 nmi (2,040 km; 1,300 mi)
Takeoff (MTOW, SL, ISA)	3,280 ft (1,000 m)	3,870 ft (1,180 m)	4,675 ft (1,425 m)
Landing (MLW, SL)	2,560 ft (780 m)	3,415 ft (1,040 m)	4,230 ft (1,289 m)

== See also ==
Related development

- de Havilland Canada Dash 7

Aircraft of comparable role, configuration, and era

- 29–36 seats
  - British Aerospace Jetstream 41
  - Dornier 328
  - Embraer EMB 120 Brasilia
  - Saab 340
- 42–60 seats
  - Antonov An-140
  - ATR 42
  - Fokker 50
  - Saab 2000
  - Xian MA60
  - Xian MA600
- 64–78 seats
  - ATR 72
  - British Aerospace ATP
  - Ilyushin Il-114
  - Xian MA700

Related lists

- List of airliners
