= SkyLink Express =

Canadian cargo airline

IATA	ICAO	Call sign
—	SLQ	SKYLINK
- Founded: 1994; 32 years ago
- Ceased operations: March 2025
- Hubs: Vancouver; Calgary; Winnipeg; Hamilton; Montréal-Mirabel
- Fleet size: 12
- Destinations: North America
- Headquarters: Mississauga, Ontario, Canada
- Website: SkyLink Express

SkyLink Express was a cargo airline headquartered in Mississauga, Ontario, Canada. It operated dedicated air cargo / courier feeder flights throughout Canada and the United States and provided on demand air cargo charters from its bases in Vancouver, Calgary, Winnipeg, Hamilton and Montréal-Mirabel.

== History ==
The airline was established in February 1994 as QuikAire Cargo Inc. by Dan Rocheleau, founder and president of the airline, started the airline using the Cessna 208 Caravan to meet a specialized demand in the Canadian short-haul air cargo market, but now only uses Beechcraft 1900 aircraft.

In April 1996, QuikAire Cargo Inc. formed a partnership with SkyLink Group of Companies and rebranded itself as SkyLink Express Inc. The new relationship fostered the next stage of growth for the airline as it acquired courier feeder contracts across Canada. In 1996, SkyLink Express also became the first carrier in Canada to operate Raytheon factory-converted, all-cargo, Beechcraft 1900 aircraft. Today, the airline operates the largest Beechcraft 1900C fleet in Canada and second largest in North America.

In July 2009, SkyLink Express entered into a partnership with Cargojet to combine SkyLink Express operational assets and routes with a Cargojet subsidiary, Prince Edward Air, to consolidate regional air cargo operations into Cargojet Regional Partnership.

In July 2010, SkyLink Express purchased 100% of Cargojet Regional Partnership from Cargojet.

In 2013, SkyLink Express expanded into Western Canada as new flight crew / maintenance bases were launched in Vancouver (August 2013) and Winnipeg (September 2013).

Past and present courier/cargo feeder operations include United Parcel Service (UPS), FedEx, DHL Express, Altimax, Canada Post, Cargojet, Dynamex, Midland Courier, Purolator Inc. and Sameday Worldwide.

In March 2024, Skylink Express filed under the Companies' Creditors Arrangement Act to restructure their businesses and financial affairs.

== Facilities ==
SkyLink Express maintained the following facilities in Canada.

- Hamilton
- Mirabel
- Montreal
- Toronto
- Vancouver
- Winnipeg

== Fleet ==
SkyLink Express fleet consisted of the following aircraft:

SkyLink Express fleet
Aircraft	In service	Variants	Notes
Beechcraft 1900	12	10 - 1900C, 2 - 1900D	Payload 5,500 lb (2,500 kg), the 1900D is not listed by SkyLink Express
Cessna 208 Caravan	n/a	208B Grand Caravan	Payload 3,300 pounds (1,500 kg), listed as Cessna Grand Caravan / Super Cargomaster 208B Freighter by SkyLink Express but not registered with Transport Canada
Total	12		
