= Billy Bishop Toronto City Airport =

Airport in Toronto Islands, Ontario, Canada

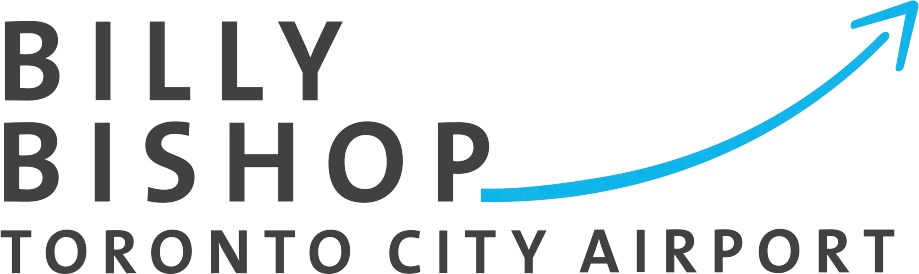

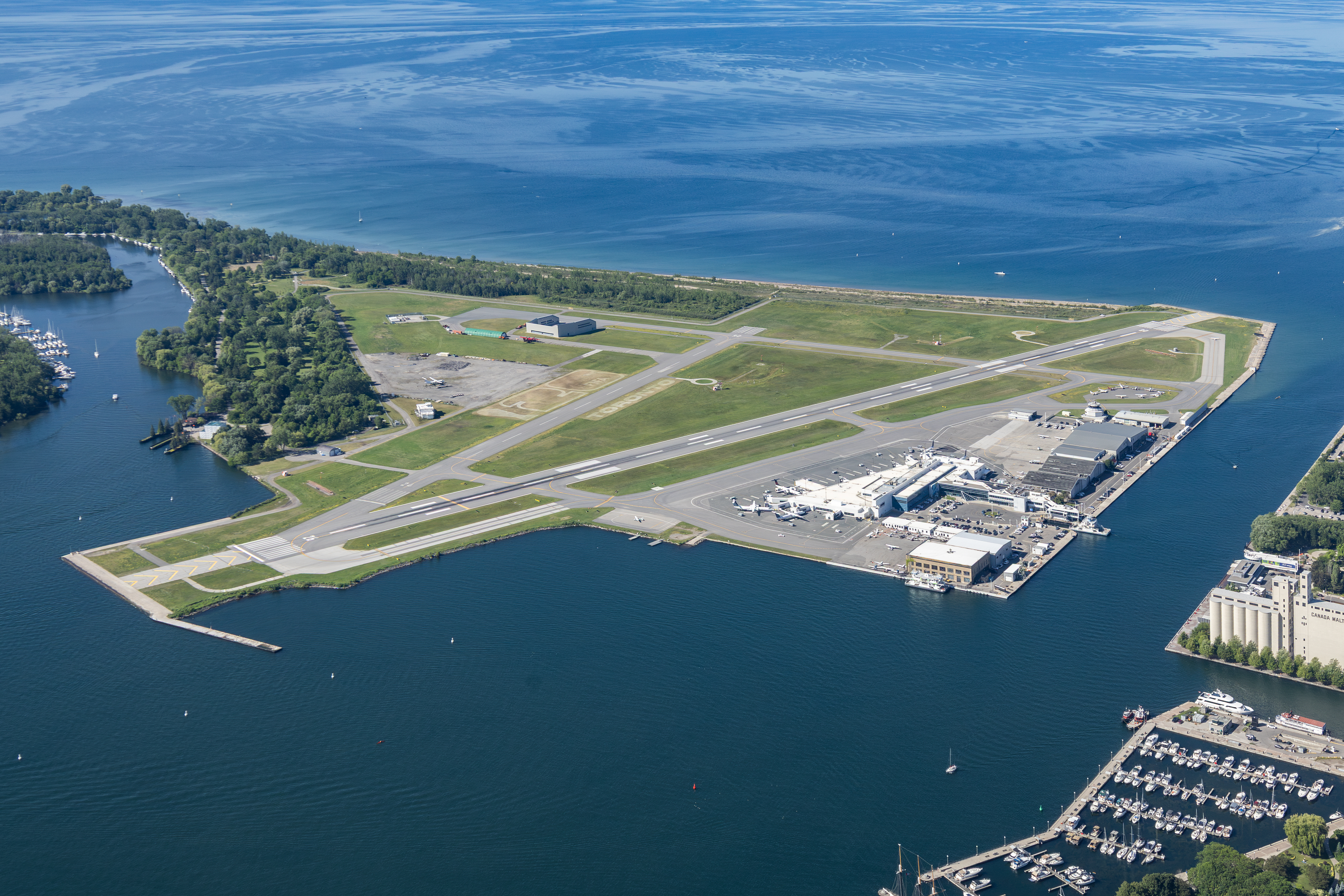
- Billy Bishop Toronto City Airport as seen from CN Tower in 2026
- IATA: YTZ; ICAO: CYTZ; WMO: 71265

Summary
- Airport type: Public
- Owner: Toronto Port Authority / Nieuport Aviation (Note: The TPA owns and operates the airport. Nieuport Aviation owns and operates the passenger terminal.)
- Operator: Toronto Port Authority / Nieuport Aviation
- Location: Toronto Islands
- Hub for: Porter Airlines
- Time zone: EST (UTC−05:00)
  - Summer (DST): EDT (UTC−04:00)
- Elevation AMSL: 252 ft (77 m)
- Coordinates: 43°37′39″N 79°23′46″W
- Public transit access: Union Station shuttle
- Website: www.billybishopairport.com

Map
- Location in Toronto CYTZ (Ontario) CYTZ (Canada)

Runways
Direction	Length		Surface
Direction	ft	m	Surface
06/24	2,460	750	Asphalt
08/26	3,988	1,216	Grooved asphalt

Statistics (2022)
- Aircraft movements: 111,538
- Passenger traffic: 1,732,000 ▲
- Sources: Canada Flight Supplement; Environment Canada; Movements from Statistics Canada; Passenger traffic from portstoronto.com

Billy Bishop Toronto City Airport (IATA: YTZ, ICAO: CYTZ), also known as Toronto Island Airport, is an airport of entry located on the Toronto Islands, in Toronto, Ontario, Canada. The airport primarily serves short-haul flights to destinations across Canada and the United States by Air Canada and Porter Airlines. The airport is one of nine Canadian airports that contain United States border preclearance facilities. Situated close to downtown Toronto, it is one of two airports with scheduled airlines located in the Toronto area, alongside the primary Toronto Pearson International Airport. It is operated by the federal Toronto Port Authority corporation.

The airport is used by civil aviation, air ambulances, and regional airlines using turboprop planes. Its operations are supported by user fees added to tickets and various government subsidies. In 2025, it was ranked Canada's 12th-busiest airport. The airport's name honours Billy Bishop, the Canadian World War I flying ace and World War II Air Marshal.

Opened in 1939 as the Port George VI Island Airport, for much of its history it has operated mainly as a small civil aviation airport operated at a subsidy. This changed with the introduction of a new corporation to operate the facility as a self-sufficient enterprise that has consistently advocated for expansion. In its recent history, the airport has been controversial locally, being a major issue in municipal politics. Its operator and the City of Toronto have been involved in several disputes and a planned expansion, including a bridge to the airport, were cancelled. To support its expanded role, a new passenger terminal and pedestrian tunnel have been built. In 2026, the Ontario government announced plans to introduce jets at the airport, and expropriated municipal lands in advance of any plan. However, after an online survey that showed an 80% opposition rate to the idea, the Government of Canada announced it would not support the proposal, leaving it to some future time.

== Description ==
The airport is located on the Toronto Islands, south-west of downtown Toronto. The airport has one main east–west runway, a shorter runway 20 degrees off, and a seaplane base, Billy Bishop Toronto City Water Aerodrome. The airport is used for scheduled short-haul airline service and for general aviation, including medical evacuation (MEDEVAC) flights (due to its proximity to downtown hospitals), small charter flights, and private aviation. Under its operating agreement, jet aircraft and certain propeller aircraft are banned from the airport, with the exception of MEDEVAC flights. There is one passenger terminal at the airport, built in 2010. The airport property is approximately 85 ha (210 acres) in size.

The airport is operated as a division of the Toronto Port Authority (TPA), a federal corporation, which also manages Toronto Harbour. The airport is classified as an airport of entry by Nav Canada and is staffed by the Canada Border Services Agency (CBSA). The CBSA officers at the airport can handle aircraft with up to 90 passengers. The airport also has a United States border preclearance facility. The airport's hours of operation are 6:45 a.m. to 11:00 p.m., except for MEDEVACs and emergencies. The airport's hours are governed by the 2003 update of the Tripartite Agreement, which set the hours of operation. Airfield crash fire rescue and EMS are provided by the Billy Bishop Airport Emergency Response Service, backed up by Toronto Fire Services and Toronto EMS.

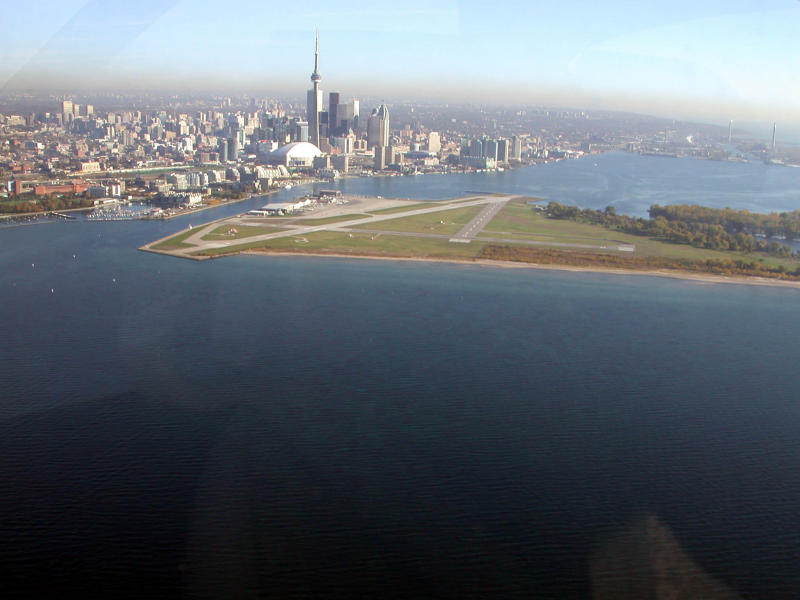
Aerial view from the southwest.

The airport is accessible from a pedestrian tunnel at the foot of Eireann Quay, which is free to use. From a pavilion on the mainland end, a 240 m (800 ft) pedestrian tunnel and a tunnel for sewage and water mains connect to the airport. The pedestrian tunnel has moving sidewalks, with elevators at both ends. On the island side, an escalator serves patrons. A consortium known as Forum Infrastructure Partners, composed of firms Arup, PCL and Technicore, designed, built, financed and maintains the tunnel.

A ferry operates between the same location and the airport every 15 minutes from 5:15 a.m. to midnight (the 5:15 ferry is for airport staff; airline passengers can begin crossing at 5:30). A free shuttle bus service operates between the intersection of York Street and Front Street and the airport. There is a taxi stand at the dock. Short-term and long-term parking is available at the dock and on the island. There is no curb-side parking. The 509 Harbourfront streetcar line, which connects to the subway, serves the intersection of Bathurst Street and Queens Quay, one block north of the ferry dock.

The airport imposes a CA$29 "airport improvement fee" departure tax on each passenger boarding scheduled flights.

Since 2015, Billy Bishop has participated in customer surveys with the "Airport Service Quality Survey" of Airports Council International. In March 2017, the airport was named the "Best Airport in North America" in two categories based on 2016 surveys.

In 2019, the airport was ranked 124th in the world, and worst in Canada by AirHelp, which based its rankings on on-time performance, quality of service and food and shops. On-time performance was rated only 5.8/10, while the airport received 8.1/10 for service and 7.0/10 for food and service.

== History ==
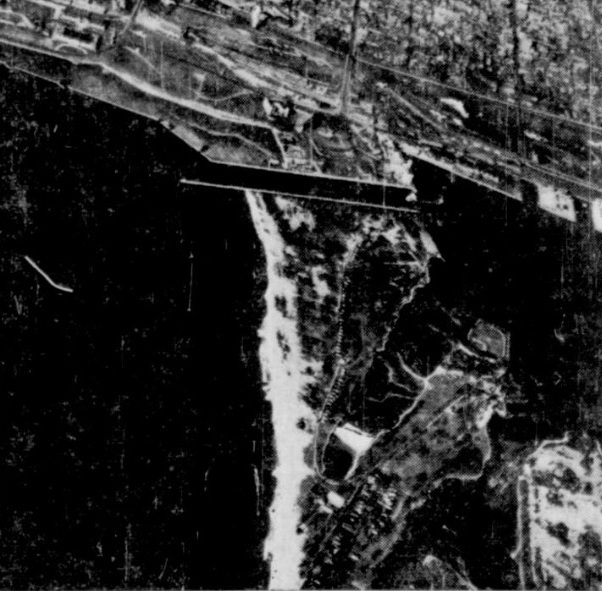
Aerial view of the airport site in 1937, prior to construction. Hanlan's baseball stadium is visible to middle right.

=== 1930s–1940s ===
The first proposal to build an airport was made in June 1929 by the Toronto Harbour Commission. The commission proposed a four-stage plan, starting with an "air harbour" for seaplanes, while the final stages proposed filling the then-regatta course lagoon between the sandbar and Hanlan's Point. Toronto City Council at that time agreed to the "air harbour" but "in no way—either by implication or suggestion—implies approval of the ultimate development of a combined air harbour and airport." In August 1935, Council reversed its position and approved the airport project by a vote of 15–7, against the opposition of Toronto mayor Sam McBride (who was serving as a Councillor at the time). City Council received approval from the Government of Canada to spend $976,000 ($22 million in 2025 dollars) on a tunnel under the Western Gap. That fall, after construction began, a federal election was held and William Lyon Mackenzie King was elected as prime minister. King's government reversed the previous government's decision and cancelled the tunnel.

Trans-Canada Air Lines was expected to begin operations in 1937, so in November 1936, City Council (without McBride, who died days earlier) formed an "Advisory Airport Committee" to advise on where to build a municipal airport. The committee proposed several locations and of these two were approved by the Government of Canada, which agreed to fund one-quarter of the project. The two sites were the Island and Malton, north-west of Toronto. A seaplane and land airport would be built at the island, and an auxiliary field was to be built at Malton. The project would fill in the regatta lagoon and extend the airport site on both the east and west sides. After two days of debate, City Council voted 14–7 to approve the construction of both airports.

The site of the airport had been home to Hanlan's Point Stadium, numerous cottages, Hanlan's Point Amusement Park and the regatta course. The 54 cottages and their cottagers were moved to today's Algonquin Island (then named Sunfish Island). The seaplane base was first used in 1938. The paved runways and the terminal building were opened in 1939. In April 1939, Toronto Council voted to name the airport Port George VI Island Airport to commemorate an upcoming visit by King George VI in May 1939. The first commercial passenger flight to the airport was a charter flight carrying Tommy Dorsey and his swing band for a two-day engagement at the Canadian National Exhibition on September 8, 1939 operated by a Douglas DC-3. It was also the first airliner from the United States to arrive in Toronto. A 48-person cable ferry service was inaugurated to the airport.

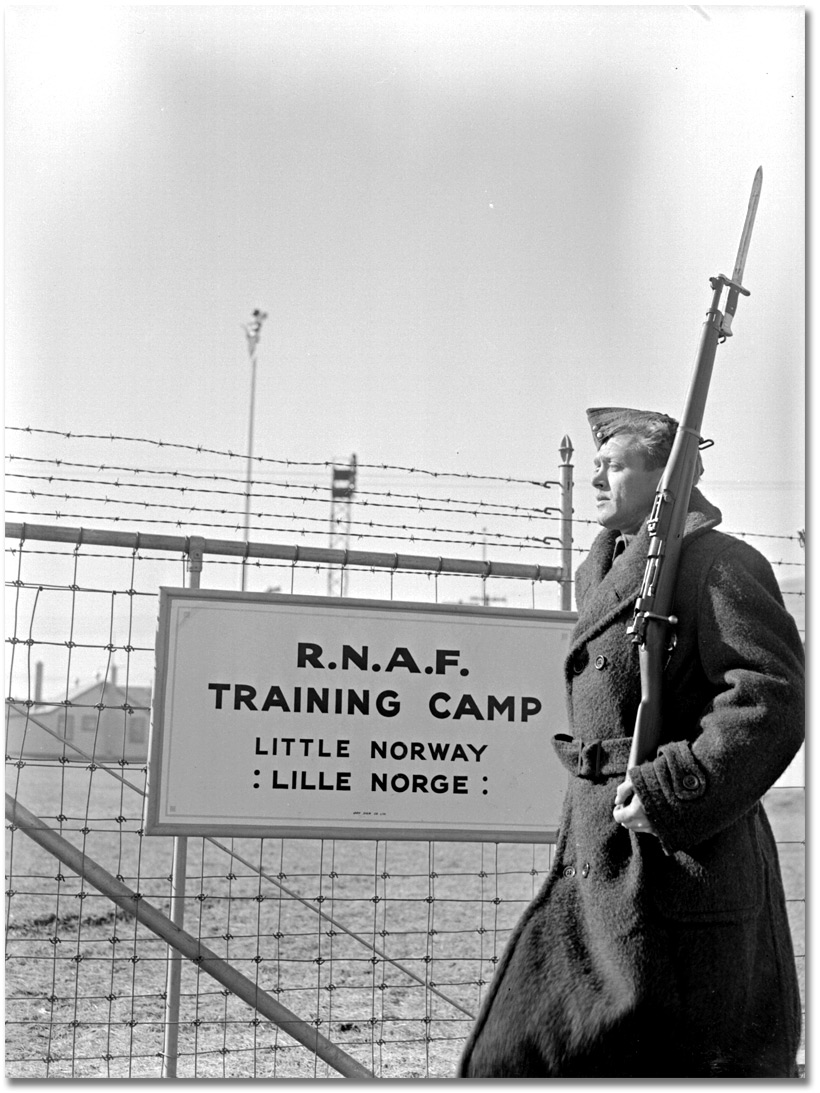
The era of the Royal Norwegian Air Force at the airport

During World War II, the island airport became a military training base. From 1940 until 1943, the Royal Norwegian Air Force used the island airport as a training facility. Barracks were built nearby on the mainland at the foot of Bathurst Street. The nearby Little Norway Park is named in remembrance of the Norwegian community around the airport. For the duration of the war, the airport was used by the Royal Canadian Air Force for training pilots and as a waypoint for transporting planes. After the war, the airport returned to civilian uses. Flying clubs and several aviation companies set up at the airport, offering services such as aircraft rentals, air freight, charter flights, pilot training and sight-seeing flights.

=== 1950s–1960s ===
By the end of 1952, the accumulated cost of running the island airport, and paying the interest on the debt of construction, totalled $752,000 ($8.7 million in 2025 dollars). Toronto Mayor Allan A. Lamport, one of the original supporters in 1937 of building the island airport, began a renewed effort, along with the Harbour Commission, to expand the airport, hoping to make it profitable. He pushed for a deal to turn over Malton Airport to the Government of Canada in exchange for improvements at the island. The Government of Canada was amenable to the deal and expanding the island airport, and installed an air traffic control system in 1953, but no comprehensive agreement was yet made. An agreement was reached in July 1955, but an impasse arose between the governments over the terms of the agreement. The impasse was settled in 1957. Runway construction began in 1959 and was finished in 1960.

By 1956, takeoffs and landings at the island reached 130,000 per year, many of them private flights to Muskoka and Haliburton. In July 1960, the airport recorded its millionth movement (take-off or landing) since air traffic control was installed in 1953. The Toronto Flying Club's move to the island from Malton in 1960 caused a large increase in traffic. For 1961, the airport recorded 212,735 movements, of which 168,272 were for local traffic, including student flights. By number of movements, the airport was the busiest in Canada. The cost of operating at the island airport forced the club to close and sell its 12 planes after less than a year, however.

The airport improvements, including a new hangar, the new 4,000 ft (1,219 m) main runway, and night-time landing lights, were completed in 1962. The new lights allowed the first use of the airport for night-time flights since World War II when Norwegian flyers practised night-time flights. Night-time flights began on April 15, 1963, and the airport extended its closing hour from one half-hour before sun-down to midnight. The Government of Canada spent $3,118,500 on the improvements ($31.8 million in 2025 dollars).

In January 1964, the cable ferry was retired, replaced by the Harbour Commission tugboat Thomas Langton. That year, interest by municipal government officials was renewed in a new link to the airport. Takeoffs and landings had declined from the 1961 peak to 189,000 in 1962 and 187,000 in 1963, despite the addition of night-time capability. The decline was attributed to two factors: the limited access and poor service the ferry provided and the opening of the Buttonville Municipal Airport north of Toronto in 1962. The City of Toronto, spurred by Lamport, wanted the Government of Canada to provide a better ferry or a lift bridge. The Metropolitan Toronto (Metro) planning department studied a proposal to build a bridge, although full automobile access was opposed by the Metro Commissioner of Parks, Tommy Thompson, whose department was converting the islands to parkland. The Maple City, capable of carrying vehicles and passengers, took over the ferry service in March 1965.

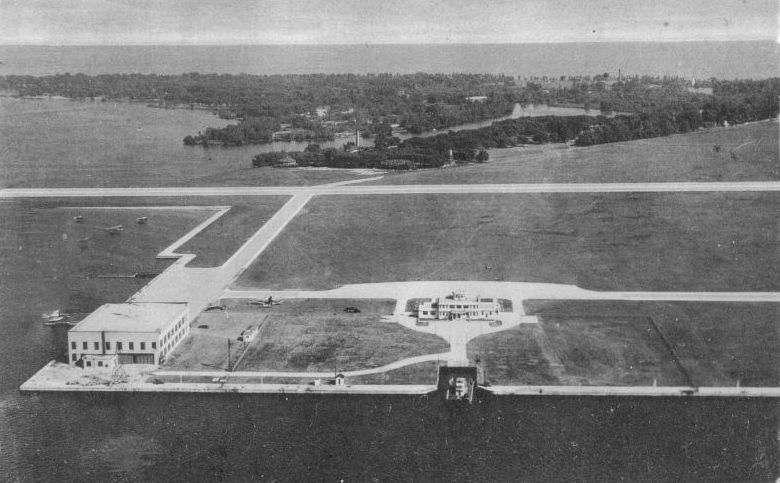
The airport and the islands in 1944

In 1967, the Harbour Commission initiated a study into converting the airport into one suitable for the passenger jets of the day, such as DC-8s. The island airport runways were too short for jets, so a new airport would have to be built on new land reclaimed from Lake Ontario. The commission developed this further into a full redevelopment of the islands, whereby a residential development, entitled Harbor City, would be built on the existing island airport lands, and a new airport with a runway long enough for jets would be built on a peninsula parallel to the south shore of the Toronto Islands. This plan also outlined the development of a new harbour, the Outer Harbour east of the Eastern Gap. The plan was later modified to situate the new island airport on the Outer Harbour headland, east of the islands, with road access available from the Gardiner Expressway south along Leslie Street. The Government of Canada ruled out the waterfront site for a major airport early in 1970, although Transport Minister Donald Jamieson suggested there would be some sort of expanded airport serving "short-hop, inter-city" flights created.

=== 1970s–1980s ===
By 1970, the annual operating deficit (the cost of operating the airport minus revenues collected) of the airport had reached $200,000 ($1.62 million in 2025 dollars). Toronto mayor William Dennison warned that the airport could be closed as the Harbour Commission did not want to absorb the amount. At the time, the island airport site was to become the site of the Harbor City residential development, although a replacement for the island airport had not been agreed upon. A 1969 proposal to build a new airport by the new headland was met with opposition from local residents and Toronto City Councillors and was dropped. With plans uncertain, the Government of Canada requested that the Harbour Commission continue to operate the airport as is in the interim.

In 1972, the Harbor City project died when the governments of Canada and Ontario proposed to build a new major airport in Pickering, Ontario. At the same time, the Government of Canada initiated a feasibility study of converting the island airport to a major airport for Short Takeoff and Landing (STOL) planes. Later that year, the Harbour Commission announced plans for an aquatic park on the Outer Harbour headland, the location in the 1968 plan for the relocated island airport.

In 1973, de Havilland Aircraft of Canada, makers of the new DHC-7 (Dash 7) STOL plane, proposed a network of STOL airports around Ontario, with the Island Airport as its hub, to the Government of Ontario cabinet ministers and the Government of Canada cabinet ministers. The first versions of the Dash 7 could support flights from the island to smaller centres, such as Sarnia, Kingston, Peterborough and Owen Sound, with a larger version able to support flights to larger centres such as London, North Bay, Ottawa and Windsor. The island airport, which operated under visual flight rules, would have to be upgraded to instrument flight rules to operate the service. De Havilland also proposed a bridge to the island airport over the Western Gap. The Government of Ontario was interested in the proposal, and asked the Canadian government to work towards development of STOL. Ontario Intergovernmental Affairs Minister John White characterized "regional air service in southern Ontario as totally deficient."

By 1974, the annual operating deficit of running the airport had reached $300,000 per year ($1.88 million in 2025 dollars), $130,000 of it in operating the Maple City ferry. The City of Toronto decided to ask the Government of Ontario and the Government of Canada to cover the deficit. After study by the Toronto, Metro, Ontario and Canadian governments, the Government of Canada agreed to grant an annual subsidy to the Harbour Commission to operate the airport, while the Government of Ontario agreed to pay for the costs of the airport ferry. The Government of Canada put a condition on the subsidy, that intergovernmental agreement needed to be reached on the future of the airport. Agreement on the future of the airport would take several years.

In January 1975, Otonabee Airways launched the first scheduled passenger service at the airport. Otonabee operated a three-times a day service between the island airport and Montreal's international airport. 1975 was also the year that the island airport was used as the base for Olga, a Sikorsky S-64 Skycrane helicopter used to dismantle the crane of the new CN Tower under construction and hoist sections of its new antenna into place on top of its concrete tower.

In April 1978, Transport Minister Otto Lang announced a plan to provide daily scheduled airline service between the airport, Ottawa and Montreal, using de Havilland Dash 7 STOL planes. The Government of Canada would invest $5 million in improvements at the airport including a covered moving pedestrian sidewalk linking the airport with Lake Shore Boulevard. The plan was rejected by Toronto City Council, and the Canadian Transport Commission turned down the plan stating that the airport's services were not satisfactory and required upgrading.

Art Eggleton was elected Toronto mayor and a compromise was reached in 1981, when the City of Toronto agreed to a limited level of commercial STOL passenger service, and the exclusion of jet airplanes. A memorandum of understanding was signed by the THC, the City and Transport Canada, and in 1982, the Canadian Transport Commission issued a licence to City Centre Airways to operate Dash 7 planes between the island, Ottawa and Montreal. In 1983, the City of Toronto, the THC, and the Government of Canada signed a tripartite agreement over operation of the airport. The agreement, in force until 2033, leases the land for the airport at a rate of $1 per year. The majority of the airport land is owned by the Government of Ontario with two small sections owned by the Government of Canada and a small section owned by Toronto. The agreement made provisions for a restricted list of aircraft allowed to use the airport due to noise levels, prohibitions on jet traffic except for MEDEVAC flights and prohibition against the construction of a fixed link between Toronto Island and the mainland. According to the Tassé report: "The Tripartite Agreement does not directly set a maximum number of flights or passengers at the Island Airport; it does, however, establish noise exposure parameters that are not to be exceeded (NEF 25), thus effectively providing restrictions on the number of flights." The number and type of flights are to stay within the Noise Exposure Forecast (NEF) 25 exposure level to neighbours. The agreement was amended in 1985 to specifically allow the new de Havilland Dash 8, small 37–39 seat planes at the time, which are not considered STOL planes.

In 1984, Air Atonabee, (as Otonabee Airways had been renamed in 1980) was re-organized into a new regional airline known as City Express. From 1984 until 1991, City Express continued and expanded its operations at the airport, peaking at 400,000 passengers annually in the mid-1980s.

=== 1990s–2010s ===
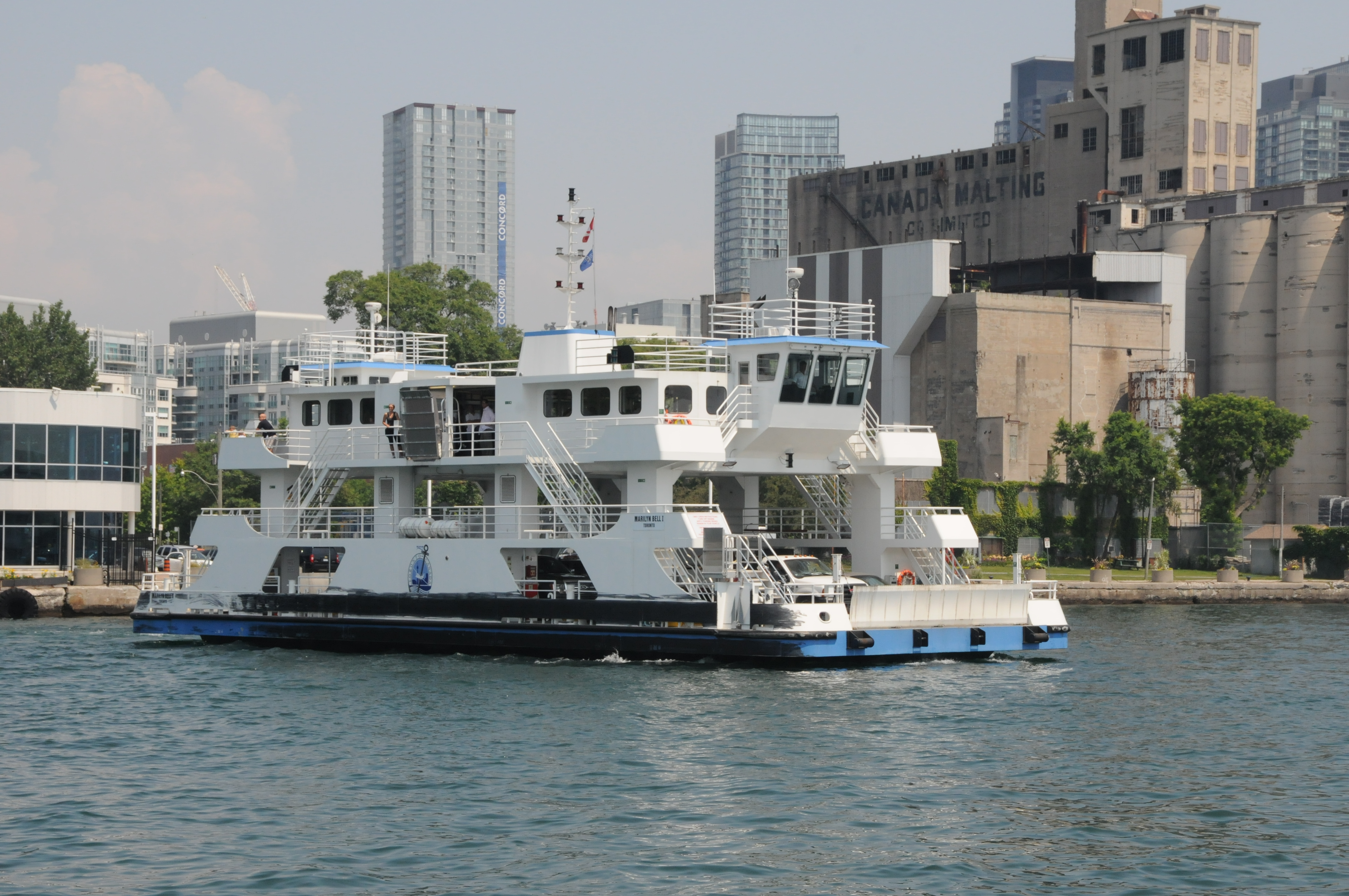
Marilyn Bell I ferry

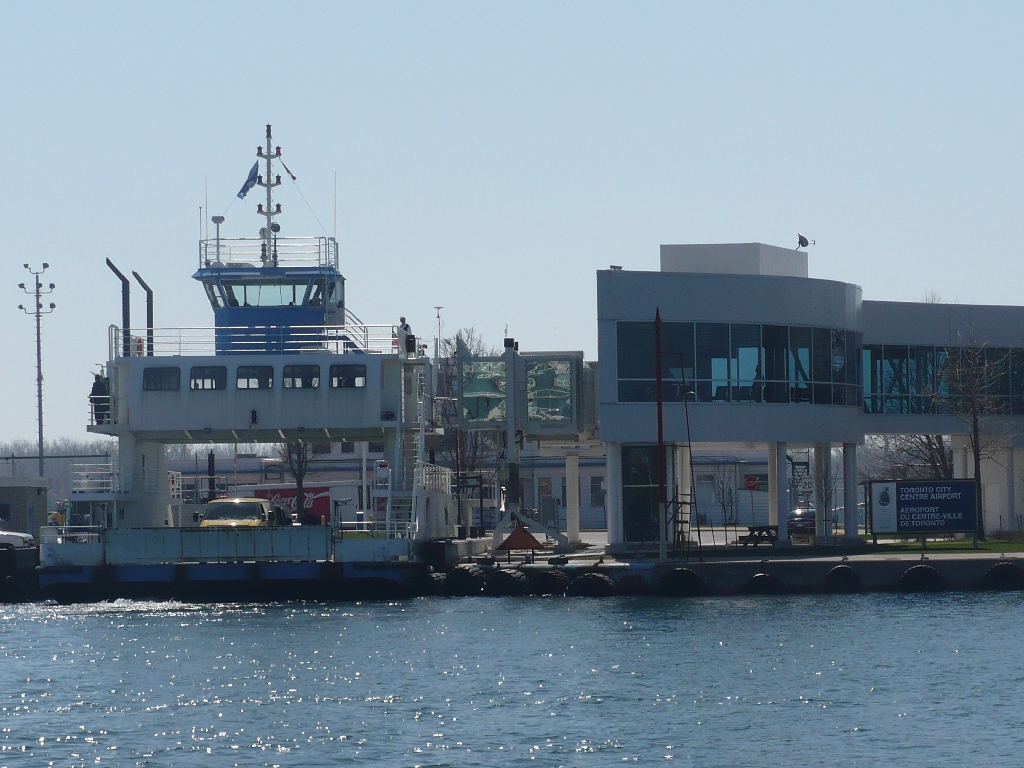
David Hornell ferry

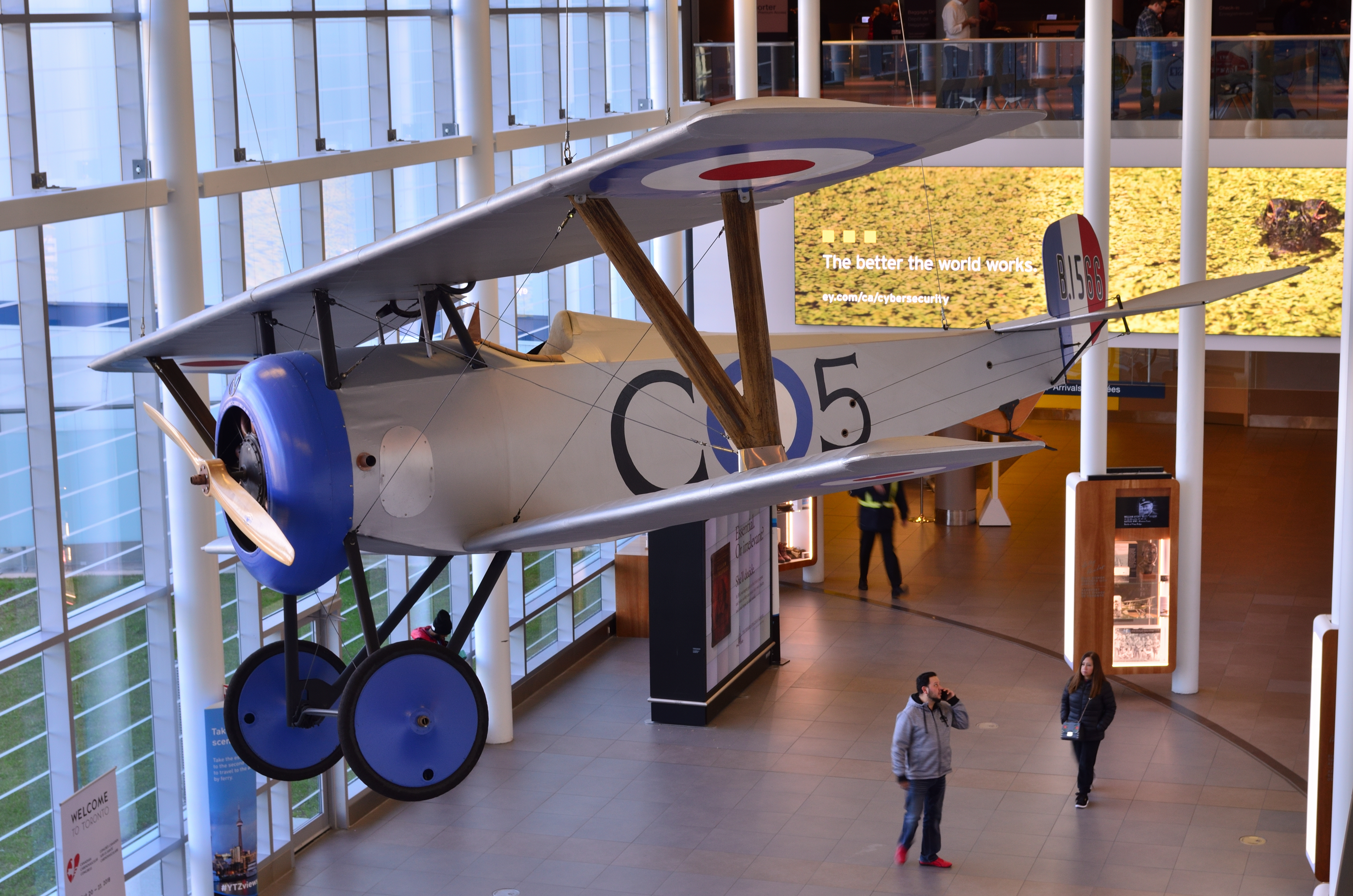
A replica of Billy Bishop's Nieuport 17 inside the Billy Bishop Toronto City Airport terminal

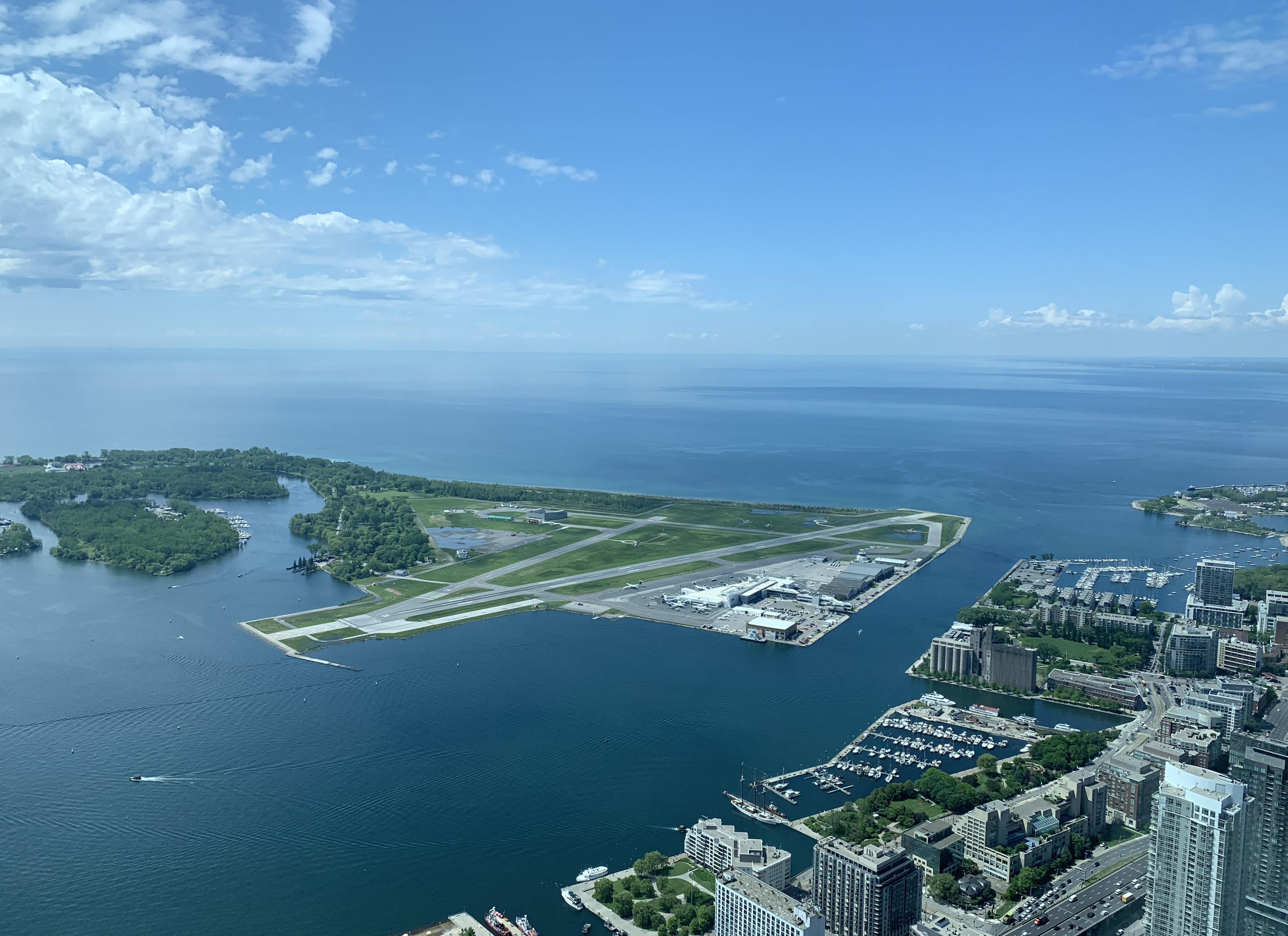
Airport as seen from the LookOut Level of the CN Tower

In 1990, Air Ontario (later to become Air Canada Jazz) started operating regional airline service to Ottawa and Montreal. That year, City Express folded in bankruptcy. In 1994, Jazz built a new terminal, moving out of trailers. That year, the airport was renamed the Toronto City Centre Airport.

The Toronto Harbour Commission made plans to expand the airport so as to achieve self-sufficiency, as it was dependent on subsidies from the City of Toronto and had transferred much of its land to the City in exchange for an ongoing subsidy. In 1992, the THC proposed to build a bridge to the airport for safety reasons and as an improvement, at a cost of CA$8 million. THC's plans were initially opposed by Toronto City Council, but after the THC threatened to close the airport, an agreement was reached. Council agreed to a bridge on condition of continuing the 'no jets' ban, and that it not be built with Toronto tax dollars. After the City of Toronto was amalgamated, the plan was re-opened and a tunnel proposed instead, but the new Toronto City Council approved a bridge in 1998.

In 1999, the THC was renamed the Toronto Port Authority (TPA). The Authority was expected to manage the port more like a business. A review of the airport operations concluded that the airport "is not sustainable and will likely lead to continued financial losses." Passenger volumes had declined to 140,000 annually from a peak of 400,000 in 1987. The consultants concluded that if services were upgraded to include small jets, that possibly 900,000 passengers could be carried annually by 2020. The report proposed a CA$16 million bridge and CA$2 million in runway upgrades. A bridge was started but cancelled by Toronto City Council in 2003. By 2005, the number of landings and take-offs at the airport was 120,000 annually. This was a decrease from a high of 240,000 in 1962, and 198,000 in 1987. The only carrier operating at the airport was Air Canada affiliate Air Canada Jazz, operating flights between Toronto and Ottawa.

In 2006, Jazz was forced out of the airport by REGCO, the terminal owners, which announced a new Porter Airlines regional airline. Porter began regional airline service with flights to Ottawa in the fall of 2006 using Q400 series Dash 8 planes, 70-seat aircraft. Its entry into service was met by protesters who attempted to block passengers from the airport. Airport traffic increased to over 93,000 takeoffs and landings in 2008. To support Porter, the TPA launched the larger David Hornell ferry in 2006. The Maple City ferry became the back-up.

In January 2009, it was announced that the TPA would purchase a second, larger ferry to support Porter's activities. The ferry was financed out of the airport improvement fee charged to passengers. The ferry had been proposed by Porter CEO Robert Deluce to the TPA's Board of Directors over the period of March–June 2008. The decision to approve the CA$5 million ferry precipitated a conflict-of-interest investigation of TPA director Colin Watson, who is a self-described friend of Deluce's, and who voted in a 5–4 decision to approve the ferry. Watson was cleared of the charge by the federal Ethics Commissioner Mary Dawson in June 2009. The new ferry, named Marilyn Bell I (the name was chosen after a public naming contest), went into service on January 22, 2010.

At its annual meeting on September 3, 2009, the TPA announced that it would rename the airport after William Avery "Billy" Bishop, a Canadian First World War flying ace. The proposal drew criticism from TPA critics such as Adam Vaughan, charging "the port authority is putting together a "feel-good story" to prevent people from asking tough questions about how the island airport is governed." On November 10, 2009, after approval from Transport Canada, the TPA officially renamed the airport to Billy Bishop Toronto City Airport. It is the second airport in Canada, after Owen Sound Billy Bishop Regional Airport, to be named for Bishop. The airport continued to be listed in aeronautical publications and weather reports as Toronto City Centre Airport, until February 11, 2010.

In the September 17, 2009, La Presse newspaper, Air Canada president and CEO Călin Rovinescu was quoted as saying that the term of exclusivity for Porter at the airport ends in 2010 and that Air Canada is considering a return to the airport in 2010, if acceptable terms can be arranged. Later in September, Jazz chief executive officer Joseph Randell reiterated the comments stating that it intended to restore service as early as April 2010.

Passenger traffic increased 46% from 2009 to 2010. In January 2010, the TPA announced that it would spend CA$8 million on upgrades to the airport. The upgrades included a new CA$2.3 million Equipment Maintenance Building, apron paving, equipment upgrades and a noise barrier to deflect plane maintenance noise out over the lake. The expense would be recouped from the Airport Improvement Fee charged to passengers. In February 2010, Air Canada filed suit against the TPA to get access to the airport, access it had lost when Porter had evicted Jazz in 2006. On March 29, 2010, the Federal Court ruled that Air Canada would have a hearing in July 2010 of its objections to the TPA process. On March 7, 2010, the first half of the Porter's new terminal opened. The new terminal, estimated to cost CA$50 million, was completed in early 2011. The opening of the new terminal was met by new protests by Community Air activists protesting the proposed increase in flights.

In 2011, Air Canada Express (operated by Sky Regional) began flying again out of the island airport. In July 2011, an agreement was reached between the City and the Port Authority to enable construction of a pedestrian tunnel connecting the airport. Included in the agreement was the provision that the original 1939 airport terminal building could be relocated for future use. Dismantling of the building started in November 2011. By April 2012 the terminal building had been moved from its original location and was temporarily residing on the grass to the south of runway 24. In 2014, the TPA announced that it would move the terminal closer to Hanlan's Point and turn the facility into a restaurant for the general aviation community at the airport.

In January 2015, Porter Airlines Holdings and City Centre Terminal sold the passenger terminal to a consortium known as Nieuport Aviation Infrastructure that includes InstarAGF Asset Management, an alternative-investment manager, Kilmer Van Nostrand Co, an investment firm controlled by Larry Tanenbaum, the chairman of Maple Leaf Sports & Entertainment, Partners Group, a Swiss private equity firm, and institutional clients advised by J.P. Morgan Asset Management. The buyers did not disclose a price; Bloomberg, however, reported a possible sale price of more than CA$750 million. Public records indicated that Scotiabank held a mortgage of CA$650 million.

In June 2015, Metrolinx inaugurated the UP Express providing a direct mass transit link to Pearson airport. This rail link was built in time for the 2015 Pan-Am Games. It connects Toronto Union Station to Pearson. It is considered to be an alternative to using Billy Bishop airport.

In June 2016, a three-year project to update the runways at the airport began and was completed in October 2018. The project repaved runways 06/24 and 08/26 and upgraded the electrical and lighting systems. The airport decommissioned runway 15/33, due to its lack of use and operational restrictions, and converted it into a taxiway. In October 2016, PortsToronto approved a 27,000 square feet (2,500 m^{2}) expansion of the terminal, including a new gate, and room for U.S Customs preclearance if it is approved in the future, which was facilitated in March 2026.

Despite an increase in passenger traffic, Porter Airlines still reported a loss in operations during this period. In 2017, it lost CA$18.9 million, in 2018 CA$40 million and CA$30 million in 2019. In 2018, Porter reduced the number of slots it rented from Nieuport by 18.5%, effective in 2020, reducing its costs by CA$12.2 million. Porter began operations in 2021 at Pearson airport, where it could operate jets. Porter estimated that operating at Billy Bishop was three times the cost of operating at Pearson.

==== Cancelled expansion plans ====
In April 2013, Porter announced a conditional purchase of 12 Bombardier CS100 passenger jets, with an option to purchase 18 more. Porter president Robert Deluce announced that the airline would seek an extension of the main runway by 336 m (1,102 ft), 168 m (551 ft) at either end, to accommodate the longer landing and takeoff requirements of the aircraft. The airline would also seek an exemption for the CS100 aircraft from the jet ban at the airport imposed in the 1983 Tripartite Agreement of the airport. The changes would require the agreement of the Government of Canada, the Toronto Port Authority and the City of Toronto. The TPA announced that it would await the direction of Toronto City Council on the potential expansion. A new community group "NoJetsTO" was formed to collect opposition to the plan to allow jets at the airport. The City of Toronto started consultations in September 2013, both online and at "town hall" sessions, to produce a report from staff for presentation to Council. As consultations began, Porter increased its request to 200 m (660 ft) extensions at each end of the runway. The Toronto Port Authority notified the City of Toronto that it was seeking an extension to the tripartite agreement beyond 2033 as a condition of the runway extension plan.

The staff report was released to the public on November 28, 2013, and staff recommended putting off consideration of the plan until 2015, due to incomplete information and the various unresolved issues, including the CS100 noise information, Transport Canada regulations, and Toronto Port Authority requirements. The report also noted that the airport does not have a "Master Plan" unlike other airports, and staff suggested is essential for consideration to extend the tripartite agreement. The plan is to be discussed by the City Council executive committee and full Council in December 2013. The board of Waterfront Toronto endorsed the report, stating "serious transportation, road congestion, and community impact issues created by the airport's current operations" be addressed before any new plans are considered. Executive committee of Council agreed to defer its consideration of the proposal until January 2014.

In January 2014, the Toronto Port Authority announced that it would seek CA$100 million from the Government of Canada to expand infrastructure around the airport if the expansion plans and jets are approved for use at the airport.

In April 2014, Toronto City Council voted to defer approval of the plan, voting 44–0 to defer and wait for the Port Authority to produce plans for the airport. The Council refused to support spending any City money on the proposal. Council ordered the Port Authority to produce an environmental assessment (EA), preliminary runway design and updated airport master plan, as well as produce a figure for a proposed passenger cap on the facility. Council informed the TPA that it sought a maximum figure of 2.4 million, regardless of whether jets are implemented, while the TPA suggested an interim cap of 2.976 million, and deferred agreeing to a permanent cap figure. The TPA issued Requests For Proposals to private firms to conduct the EA and preliminary runway designs.

In April 2015, Air Canada, also a user of the airport, stated that it was opposed to the introduction of jets at the airport. "Air Canada's position on this matter is crystal clear. We do not support jets at Billy Bishop," said Derek Vanstone of the airline. Air Canada commissioned a study that concluded that the expansion would cost CA$1 billion in public expenditure.

In March 2015, PortsToronto released preliminary information on the impact of jets as part of a Master Planning Exercise. The study envisioned that the runways would be extended by 200 m (660 ft) at either end (to a total length of 1,658 m (5,440 ft)). The number of daily slots would increase to 242 from 202; the number of passengers would increase from two million to four million annually; aircraft movements would increase from 114,000 to 138,000; the marine exclusion zone around the runways would expand in width by 10 m (33 ft) to 25 m (82 ft); and the peak number of passengers at one time would grow from 944 to 1,761. The proposal would also include a jet blast barrier and a potential noise barrier. PortsToronto released the terms of reference for its environmental study in August 2015.

Under the tripartite management agreement, all three signatories must agree to re-open it; without one, the proposal cannot proceed. In November 2015, after the federal election that saw the Liberal Party of Canada return to power, the new transport minister Marc Garneau announced that the government would not re-open the tripartite agreement to allow the expansion. Porter Airlines and PortsToronto had hoped that the government would not follow through on its promise and asked for the Government of Canada to wait until studies were complete. Pratt & Whitney stated that the CS100 would have been quieter compared to the existing turboprop aircraft currently used at the airport. On December 8, PortsToronto announced it would not complete the expansion proposal reports for Council, ending work after any current technical studies were complete. Porter subsequently developed a hub at Pearson and reduced flights at Bishop airport.

==== Construction of a pedestrian tunnel connection to the mainland ====
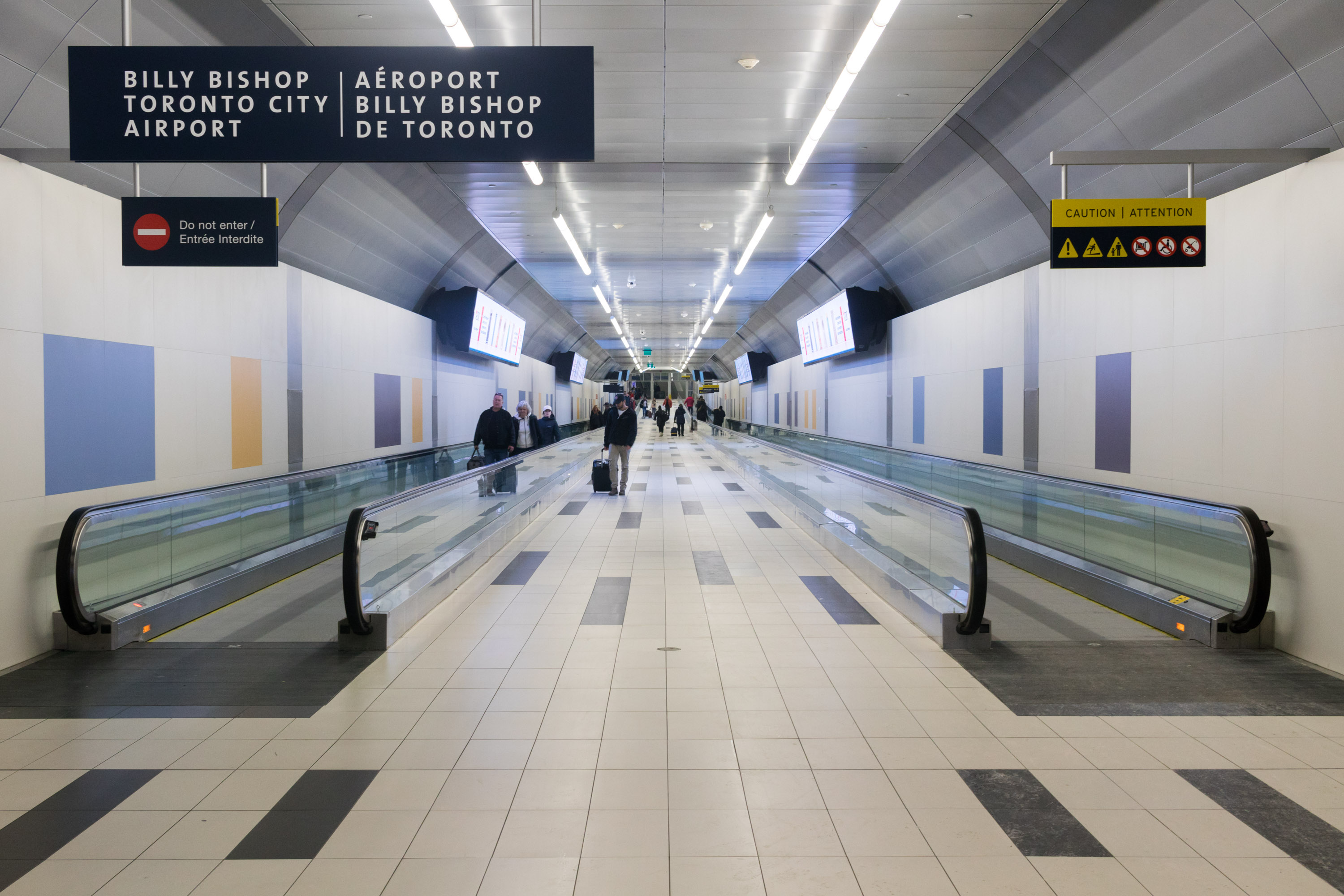
The tunnel connecting Billy Bishop to the mainland

In 2015, a pedestrian tunnel to the airport was opened, after a previous plan to build a bridge was cancelled.

A tunnel was first proposed to connect to the island airport in 1935. A tunnel was started, but cancelled and filled in. Since 1938, a car ferry has provided service to and from the airport.

In 1997, Toronto City Council approved a bridge to connect to the island airport. In 2003, Council cancelled the bridge after Toronto Mayor David Miller was elected on a platform to cancel the bridge. The Port Authority bought two new car ferries instead.

In 2009, the Toronto Port Authority (TPA), operator of the airport, first proposed to build a pedestrian tunnel connecting the airport with the mainland, at a cost of $38 million. The TPA proposed that the project be paid for primarily through federal and provincial economic stimulus funds. Critics such as federal MP Olivia Chow and Toronto City Councillor Adam Vaughan criticized the proposal as benefiting only a small number of privileged users, as well as being a subsidy to Porter Airlines' business. The project was not included on a City-approved list of projects submitted to the Government of Canada. In October 2009, the TPA, having not yet received approval for the tunnel project, announced that it was now too late to proceed if the project was to meet the March 2011 completion date condition for receiving federal infrastructure stimulus funds and withdrew the project.

In January 2010, the TPA announced that it was seeking a private-sector partner to build a pedestrian tunnel. The cost was now estimated at $45 million. This was to be financed through a $5/flight increase in the Airport Fee paid by passengers. On July 12, 2010, the TPA announced that it intended to begin construction of the tunnel as early as 2011, after conducting an environmental assessment. The tunnel would not be built on or over City of Toronto land, meaning City approval would not be required. The TPA also announced that an opinion poll conducted on behalf of the TPA suggested that "a majority (56%) of Torontonians support a pedestrian tunnel to the island airport."

The TPA conducted a private environmental assessment of the project and decided to proceed in April 2011. The TPA then short-listed three companies to respond to a request for proposals to build the tunnel. The RFP ended in October 2011. In July 2011, an agreement was reached with the City of Toronto, exchanging lands with the Port Authority, enabling the Port Authority to proceed on the pedestrian tunnel. The agreement allows the Port Authority to expand their taxi and parking space for the airport. In exchange, the City of Toronto had a water main to serve the Islands included as part of the project. In January 2012, the TPA announced that ground-breaking would take place in February 2012, with construction to take approximately two years.

Ground-breaking began in March 2012. Initially, the tunnel was estimated at CA$38 million, but this was revised to a cost of CA$82.5 million. It was expected to take 25 months to complete but eventually took 40 to complete. Tunnelling contractor Technicore Underground, Inc. had to deal with left over metal pilings from the 1930s tunnel project and contaminated soil. The pilings themselves were not a surprise, their details being in the TPA archives, but the pilings had fractured much of the rock in the tunnel area, meaning that the strength of the rock around the tunnel area was weaker and needed extra shoring up. There was also a dispute over payments and Technicore filed a $10 million lien against the project alleging unpaid work. To deal with the delays, the contractor applied for an exemption from the city's noise bylaw to work around the clock. Its application for round-the-clock work was denied, but it was allowed to work longer hours until 11 p.m. The Toronto Port Authority announced that the project would be complete during the winter of 2014/2015 and blamed the delay on the winter of 2013/2014 being colder than in previous years and ice build-up slowed progress. The agency announced a further delay to the late spring of 2015. The project finally opened on July 30, 2015.

=== 2020-present: Facility and agreement update ===
In June 2023, the Government of Canada announced that it will be spending up to CA$30 million to build U.S border preclearance facility at the airport. It is expected to open by 2025 and will enable flights from the island airport to at least ten new U.S destinations. In June 2023, Air Canada opened a joint venture lounge under the Air Canada Cafe brand with Aspire, owned by Swissport, in the domestic zone of the terminal. This marked the first lounge at the airport.

In 2024, PortsToronto presented a plan to conform to new safety requirements of Transport Canada to extend runways for run-off safety. The agency presented three proposals to conform, and add roadways and taxiways. In conjunction with this, the agency asked for an extension of the tripartite agreement of 40 years, which it argued was necessary to finance the runway extension. The agency pushed for the maximum runway extension, with plans to increase flights, a consistent position of the agency. This was turned down by Toronto City Council, which approved a minimum runway extension and a twelve-year extension to the tripartite agreement. City Council, led by Toronto Mayor Olivia Chow, cited the previous controversy over the airport and chose the easiest path forward, not wanting to reopen the debate.

In 2025, it was announced that Hoverlink had reached an agreement with PortsToronto to establish a terminal for its proposed hovercraft ferry service to Region of Niagara at Billy Bishop Airport.

On March 10, 2026, the preclearance facility was officially inaugurated making Billy Bishop the ninth Canadian airport to operate a preclearance facility. Air Canada announced that it would launch transborder flights from the airport to New York-LaGuardia, Boston, Chicago-O'Hare, and Washington-Dulles following the opening.

==== Ford push for jets and expansion ====
In 2026, Ontario Premier Doug Ford once again raised the topic of allowing jets at the island airport, a suggestion immediately supported by the Toronto Port Authority. According to Ford, the government had done an online poll that showed 70% of Torontonians supported expanding the airport, and that Toronto Island residents were 'squatters'. The proposal would redesign the airport to accommodate 10 million passengers annually or approximately 62,500 flights annually (using the proposed Airbus A220-100 capacity of 160 per plane).

Ford later pronounced that his government would 'take over control of the airport', with plans to expand its runway for jets under discussion. His government plans to expropriate the municipally-owned lands of the airport in an attempt to remove Toronto City Council from the administration of the airport. The plan requires the participation of the Canadian federal government as a partner in the operation of the airport and Ford stated that he thought the federal government was receptive to the proposal. According to Ford, the expansion would provide an annual CA$8.5 billion boost to the Canadian economy by 2050, a figure not supported by any economic study.

Expansion remains opposed by local Councillors, local community associations and the "NoJetsTo" and "Parks Not Planes" advocacy groups. Toronto Mayor Olivia Chow said she was opposed to jets at the airport due to the noise. The "NoJetsTo" advocacy group remobilized to oppose the expansion.

On March 23, 2026, Ford announced the provincial government would be taking over the City of Toronto's place on the agreement that governs the airport in order to expand the runway to accommodate jet aircraft. It was also announced the island airport would be declared a special economic zone, allowing the provincial government to suspend provincial and municipal laws for a given project.

Public protests occurred after the Ontario government tabled legislation to expropriate the Toronto Islands, Little Norway Park and Eireann Quay. The transportation minister announced that, while the act allowed otherwise, the province would only take what is required for expansion. Federal Conservative leader Pierre Poilievre threw his support behind the proposal, while the Ontario NDP asked the federal Liberal government to oppose the expansion.

In a deposition to an Ontario parliamentary committee, the TPA's CEO RJ Steenstra estimated the cost to expand the airport to be CA$5 billion and take 25 years to implement. The TPA further specified that the expansion would not cost taxpayers and instead by funded by fees imposed on airport users. The TPA announced that a business case for the expansion would be developed within the next year.

In July 2026, the federal government announced it had declined to support the expansion plans, with Transport Canada stating that an overwhelming majority of 87,000 responses it received in a request for public input opposed the initiative. The federal government ordered the TPA to focus on the Runway End Safety Area measures. The TPA stated that it "will work to fulfil this initiative".

The Ford government was hostile to the federal government disapproval. Its Transport Minister stated that the federal government caved to a "fringe group" and promised to continue pushing forward on the expansion, which he characterized as a 'modernization' and the "right thing to do". Also, it was reported that the Ford government has rescinded its support for the Alto high-speed rail initiative in response.

== Airlines and destinations ==
Airlines	Destinations
Air Canada Express	Boston, Chicago–O'Hare, Montréal–Trudeau, New York–LaGuardia, Ottawa, Washington–Dulles
Porter Airlines	Boston, Chicago–O'Hare, Fredericton, Halifax, Moncton, Montréal–MET, Montréal–Trudeau, Nashville, Newark, Ottawa, Québec City, Sault Ste. Marie, Thunder Bay, Timmins, Washington–Dulles
Propair	Rouyn-Noranda

== Disputes ==
=== City of Toronto taxes ===
Canadian federal agencies such as the TPA make a Payment in Lieu of Taxes (PILT) for property they own that is not leased to third parties. Such entities pay property taxes on property leased to third parties. By 2009, the City estimated that the TPA owed $37 million in unpaid PILT for all its properties. The PILT was based on the assessed value as calculated by the Municipal Property Assessment Corporation, which assesses all property for the province of Ontario. The City and the TPA presented their case before a federal dispute advisory panel. On January 26, 2009, the Dispute Advisory Panel recommended that TPA pay PILT for the airport on a per passenger basis of 80 cents per passenger. This amount was based on various considerations including similar payments made by other airports, which make the payments based on passenger numbers. At the time of the ruling, Pearson International Airport paid 94 cents per passenger. On February 10, 2009, the City applied for a judicial review to the Federal Court of Canada.

The Federal Court struck down the January 2009 DAP report, recommending a hearing before a new DAP, with TPA maintaining the right to appeal the court's decision. In an attempt to settle outstanding legal issues between the parties, the TPA and the City entered into a settlement agreement. Pursuant to the agreement, TPA and the City agreed, among other things, to meet and work together to review and resolve issues regarding PILTs. Under the agreement, the City agreed to pay $11.4 million owing on payments related to previous land transfers and $380,559 owing on harbour user fees. Pursuant to the terms of the agreement the TPA agreed to pay the City $6.4 million on account for PILTs for tax years 1999–2008 on a without prejudice basis, with the parties maintaining their rights to request a new DAP or apply for judicial review. The agreement, which was ratified by Toronto City Council, was made in conjunction with the transfer of 18 acres (7.3 ha) of land at Leslie Street and Lake Shore Boulevard for a proposed Toronto Transit Commission (TTC) light rail storage facility. As of February 28, 2013, the TPA had paid PILT of $11.66 million for the years 1999 to 2012, inclusive, which was a rate of 80 cents per passenger.

In April 2013, Toronto Council voted against adopting a tax agreement with the airport, under which the TPA would have paid PILTs for the airport on a per passenger basis at a rate of 94 cents per passenger, the same rate paid by Pearson Airport. In January 2014, the two sides agreed to the rate of 94 cents per passenger, settling the dispute over the airport. The settlement left other TPA properties on Cherry Street and the Outer Harbour Marina still in dispute. All outstanding PILT payments were settled in 2015 and a new payment structure was put in place for payments moving forward.

=== Bridge proposal ===
Since 1935, there have been repeated plans to construct either tunnels or a bridge to the airport. The airport continued to require public subsidies and various expansion plans, including jets and airport enlargement were seen as a way to increase its usage and make the airport self-sufficient. Meanwhile, during this time, the downtown area surrounding the airport was redeveloped. Whereas it was once port lands and industrial buildings, the area changed with the coming of Harbourfront Centre, which sparked condominium tower development along the waterfront near the airport and increasing the number of residents in the area.

Opposition to the airport was formalized into the Community AIR (Airport Impact Review) volunteer association in 2001, headed by activist and former councillor Allan Sparrow. It was formed by local residents to oppose expansion on the grounds of increased air and noise pollution, safety concerns and that the increase in air traffic will hamper recent government initiatives to rejuvenate the Toronto waterfront. In July 2001, at a news conference held with representatives of the Sierra Club, the David Suzuki Foundation and the Toronto Environmental Alliance, the group proposed converting the airport to parkland. Community AIR was and is supported by the City councillors of the area.

It emerged during 2002, that Robert Deluce, former executive with Canada 3000, proposed to fly regional turboprop planes from the island airport. Deluce's proposal was initially conditional on the construction of a fixed link to the airport. In 2002, the TPA made plans to link the island to the mainland by a new bridge to serve expanded services.

At the same time, the TPA was pursuing a CA$1 billion lawsuit against the City of Toronto over some 600 acres (240 ha) of port-lands it claimed were transferred improperly to the Toronto Economic Development Corporation by the TPA's predecessor, the Toronto Harbour Commission (THC), in the early 1990s during the mayorship of June Rowlands. The port-lands had been transferred under the direction of THC directors appointed by the City in exchange for a permanent subsidy of the THC under agreements made in 1991 and 1994. The lands had been earmarked for waterfront revitalization by the city after the Crombie Commission. The lawsuit would emerge as a factor in the TPA's plans for expansion of the airport, and City Council support for the TPA's plans for a new bridge became conditional upon the lawsuit being dropped.

The proposal to link the airport with a bridge had been previously approved by Toronto City Council in 1995 and 1998, with the proviso that a business plan would be presented for approval by the THC and later the TPA for operating the airport. In November 2002, City Council met to debate the competing proposals, that of closing the airport in favour of some parkland, or of approving the TPA's plans and having uncontested title to the port lands. Despite pleas from former mayor David Crombie, urban planner/activist Jane Jacobs and Harbourfront residents, the TPA plan was supported by then-mayor Mel Lastman, who argued that the estimated CA$190 million of annual economic benefit the airport would create, was too good to pass up. On November 28, 2002, Council in a day-long debate, made two votes to settle the issue. First, Council voted 32–9 to accept a settlement to end the TPA port-lands lawsuit in exchange for an immediate payment of CA$5.5 million and an annual subsidy of CA$5.5 million to the TPA until 2012. Council then voted 29–11 to approve the amendment of the tripartite agreement to permit a fixed link and the construction of a lift bridge and the city, the Federal Government and the TPA signed and delivered such amending agreement dated June 26, 2003.

The next year, a municipal election year, saw public opinion change to oppose the bridge. In October 2003, a Toronto Star poll listed 53% of residents citywide opposed the airport bridge, while 36% supported it. Bridge supporter Mel Lastman was retiring. Councillor David Miller ran for Mayor on a platform to stop the building of the bridge, a position supported by Community AIR and other local community groups. Other mayoral candidates Barbara Hall and John Tory supported the bridge. Although the bridge was an election issue, and the bridge project still required two federal approvals, the TPA continued developing the project, progressing to the point that contracts were signed with major participants (including companies operating from the airport).

In November 2003, Mr. Miller was elected Mayor of Toronto with 44% of the vote. While construction workers prepared the construction site, Miller immediately started the process to cancel the bridge project, sparking threats of another lawsuit from the TPA. The incoming City Council voted 26–18 in December 2003 to withdraw its support of the bridge project and federal Transport Minister David Collenette announced that the Government of Canada would accept the Council's position on the bridge and withdraw its support.

In January 2004, the Government of Canada would put approval of the project on hold, preventing its construction. Immediately, Deluce would file a CA$505 million lawsuit against the City of Toronto, claiming that Miller "abused his powers", by threatening councillors, had Toronto Fire Services and Toronto Hydro "interfere with the construction of a fixed link" and lobbying the Government of Canada to "withhold certain permits." The Government of Canada later transferred CA$35 million to the TPA in May 2005 to settle claims arising from the cancellation from Deluce, Aecon Construction and Stolport Corp. Compensation terms were not disclosed. TPA CEO (Lisa Raitt) commented "You will never hear about the bridge again." and "We have been working very hard since December of 2003 to deal with the request of the City of Toronto not to build a bridge, and we are very happy that the matter has been dealt with." New federal regulations were introduced to ban any future plans to build a fixed link to the airport.

=== Late-night landings ===
At the 2009 TPA annual meeting, concerns were raised about landings at the airport after the 23:00 closing time. Local residents had two concerns: the late-night noise and safety. Control tower staff are not present at Bishop after 23:00 (a practice that is very common at most smaller Canadian airports). In one specific incident in September 2008, a late Porter flight was advised by air traffic controllers to divert to Pearson, but instead landed at Bishop. For the landing, Porter was fined an undisclosed amount by the TPA. Under the airport's curfew agreement, each commercial landing outside the airport's curfew may be subject to a fine of CA$10,000.

=== Increase in number of flights ===
On October 19, 2009, the TPA published a press release indicating that other carriers were interested in using the airport and that it was accepting expressions of interest. The TPA noted that any increase in commercial traffic would be within the 1983 tripartite agreement governing usage and noise limits. In December 2009, the TPA announced that it would allow between 42 and 92 daily landings and takeoffs at the airport, beyond the current 120 per day 'slots' allotted. The slots would be allocated by an International Air Transport Association (IATA)-accredited slot coordinator. These slots would become available after Porter's new terminal building was complete.

In 2009, the Toronto Medical Officer of Health started studying the effects of the pollution from Toronto's airports. The TPA initiated a study by the Jacobs Consultancy to examine the air pollution from the airport, as part of an environmental review of the airport's activities. In January 2010, the Toronto Board of Health started holding hearings into the health effects of the island airport, including the proposed increased traffic.

In March 2010, the opening of Porter's new terminal was met by new protests by Community Air activists protesting the increase in flights. The number of slots is contested by Community Air, which asserts that this contravenes maximums previously calculated:

- 97 by Transport Canada, in May 1998,
- 122 by the Sypher Mueller report to the TPA in 2001,
- 120 by the City of Toronto and the Tassé report, and
- 167 per airport consultant Pryde Schropp McComb in a 2005 study for Porter Airlines.

In April 2010, the TPA confirmed the final results from the capacity assessment study for the BBTCA conducted by a third-party consultant, Jacobs Consultancy. The study considered that existing BBTCA commercial carrier operations would utilize approximately 112 slots in the period leading up to the pending allocation of additional slots, and recommended that the maximum number of commercial slots available at the BBTCA be increased by 90, to 202, upon the completion of the new terminal.

Air Canada pursued a judicial review of TPA's plans to open the airport to other airlines. The action was heard in Federal Court in July 2010, and the Court dismissed Air Canada's claims against the TPA's decisions of December 2009 and April 2010 with respect to the airport slot allocations. Continental Airlines had also been reported as having interest in setting up Canada-U.S. flights from the airport. In June 2010, the TPA announced that Air Canada and Continental Airlines had submitted responses that met the initial requirements outlined in the TPA's formal RFP for additional commercial airline services at the Airport, and invited each to conclude a Commercial Carrier Operating Agreement with TPA, consistent with Porter's. The Airport's independent, IATA-accredited slot coordinator, Airport Coordination Limited had evaluated the RFP responses from Air Canada and Continental with regard to BBTCA slot requests, and recommended an allocation of 30 new slots to Air Canada and 16 new slots to Continental, subject to their entering into of a Commercial Carrier Operating Agreement with the TPA. The remaining 45 new slots were allocated to Porter in accordance with its Commercial Carrier Operating Agreement.

In March 2011, Air Canada and the TPA concluded a Commercial Carrier Operating Agreement with Air Canada. Air Canada Express began flying out of the airport on May 1, 2011. United Continental Holdings (the merged Continental Airlines and United Airlines), however, decided not to fly out of the airport. The 16 slots previously held by United Continental Holdings were awarded to Porter in September 2011.

== Accidents and incidents ==
On June 20, 1941, two Norwegian pilots training at the Island Airport were killed. Their Northrop N-3PB seaplane was taking off from the harbour waters, when a ferry boat, travelling from the mainland to the Toronto Island, the Sam McBride, crossed their path. The plane crashed into the upper level of the ferry, then sank into Toronto Harbour (the Sam McBride was damaged, but remained afloat).

On February 22, 1943, a Norwegian flight instructor was killed when his Curtiss P-36 Hawk plane did not pull out of a dive and crashed at the airport. Witnesses did not see the plane make any moves to pull out of the dive. 2nd Lieutenant Conrad Mohr radioed the base that he would do a power dive. It was his last planned flight before leaving for England to rejoin his family, which had recently escaped Norway.

On August 23, 1952, a bi-plane piloted by Charles McKay and John Pretner took off from the island airport and crashed in the backyard of a home on Markham Street, near Dundas Street West in Toronto. Both men were killed in the crash and ensuing fire. The plane was used by owner Charles Catalano's Aerial Advertising Service to pull signs behind it over the annual Canadian National Exhibition (CNE). It was not pulling a sign at the time of the crash. McKay was a pilot for Catalano and Pretner was his guest aboard the plane. According to Catalano, the plane had passed an airworthiness test two weeks previous. According to witnesses, the pilot appeared to lose control of the plane when it went down. According to Donald Saunders, the Ontario District Air Regulations supervisor at the time, it was the first plane crash within Toronto since the island airport opened in 1938.

On September 12, 1953, a blimp parked at the airport was destroyed by a violent wind storm. The blimp, which had been advertising the Loblaws grocery chain, while flying over the CNE, was toppled from its mooring mast and then cut to shreds. Its pilot, Robert Brown of Lakehurst, New Jersey, suffered back and head injuries while attempting to adjust its position. A crew attempting to deflate the blimp at the time was not injured.

In October 1954, Hurricane Hazel destroyed planes parked at the airport, including one of Charles Catalano's Tiger Moth aerial advertising planes. The airport ferry had to be disconnected from its dock and floated in the middle of the channel to avoid its destruction, taking the ferry out of service.

On June 8, 1961, Henry Sharpe, a Peterborough, Ontario farmer, was killed when his plane crashed into Lake Ontario between four and eight miles east of the Island Airport. Sharpe had taken off from Peterborough at about 7:00 am that day, and encountered an electrical storm on his flight to Toronto for a milk producers' meeting.

On December 7, 1964, a Beechcraft Bonanza aircraft crashed 1,500 ft from the Island Airport runway. The pilot, Bruce MacRitchie of Toronto was saved when Toronto Harbour Police reached the aircraft about 30 seconds after the impact. The plane was returning to the Island from the Oshawa airport, when its engine failed and the plane impacted with the water.

On September 2, 1966, United States Navy Blue Angels pilot Lt. Cmdr. Dick Oliver was killed when he crashed his F-11 Tiger into a breakwater at the Island Airport, while performing in the Canadian International Air Show. The airplane was travelling west-to-east across the waterfront, lost altitude and crashed. Debris injured two bystanders at the Island airport.

On July 23, 1976, a Cessna 401 crashed and sank into Lake Ontario, one half-mile west of the airport. The pilot and two passengers, on a flight from Chicago's Midway International Airport, perished in the crash. Donald Frankel of Chicago was the president and founder of the Flying Physicians Association, Inc. and was flying his plane to Toronto to attend the association's meeting.

On January 12, 1987, a Trillium Air Britten-Norman BN-2A-20 Islander crashed into Lake Ontario. The two people on board the aircraft, the pilot and a passenger, were rescued after the accident, but the pilot later died as a result of hypothermia.

On January 12, 1992, Graham Sellers, the pilot and only occupant of a Piper Twin Comanche two-engine four-seater plane, died when both engines failed on his final approach to land at the airport. Sellars was test flying the aircraft after it had been serviced for engine problems. His plane clipped the treetops, crashed through the airport's perimeter chain link fence and came to rest on the grass next to Runway 33.

On October 9, 1993, Nigel, Louise and Sarah Martin and Dennis Kaye died in the crash of a Beech Baron that had just taken off from the island airport. The plane crashed into Lake Ontario one mile west of Ontario Place, south of Sunnyside. The plane burst into flames upon impact and burned before sinking into 15.2 metres (50 ft) of water. The pilot radioed that he had engine trouble and was going to return to the airport. The plane had engine work done the week before.

== Facilities and services ==
=== Ground transportation ===
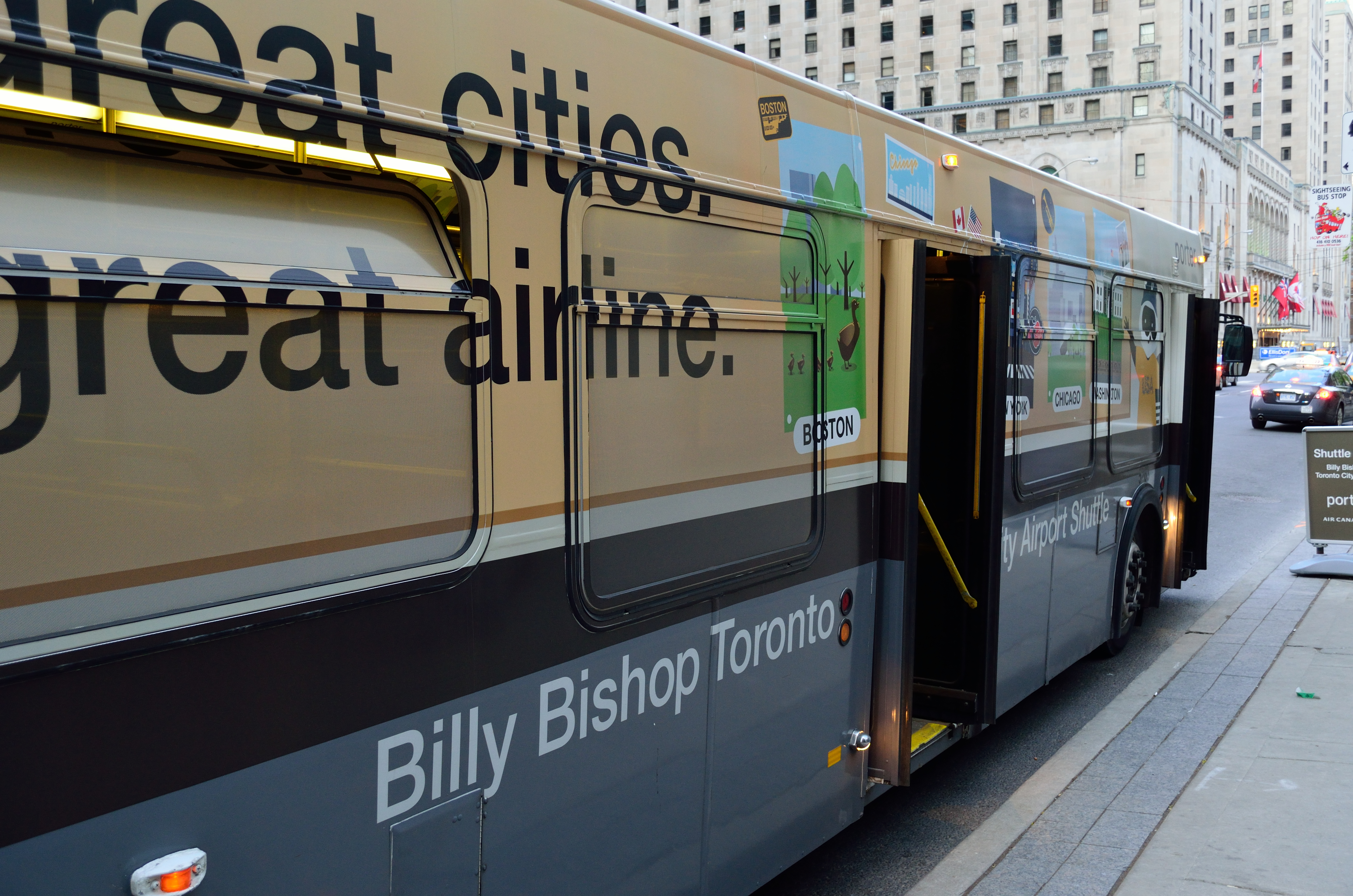
Billy Bishop shuttle bus

For Porter and Air Canada passengers, a shuttle bus to Toronto Union Station and the Fairmont Royal York operates regularly. The airport provides parking lots adjacent and at the airport itself. There is a taxi stand, and a car rental agency.

There are no direct public transit routes to the airport. There are two nearby streetcar routes operated by the TTC: the 509 Harbourfront and 511 Bathurst routes. The nearest 509 Harbourfront stops are at Bathurst and Queen's Quay, while the nearest 511 Bathurst stops are at Fleet/Lakeshore and Bathurst.

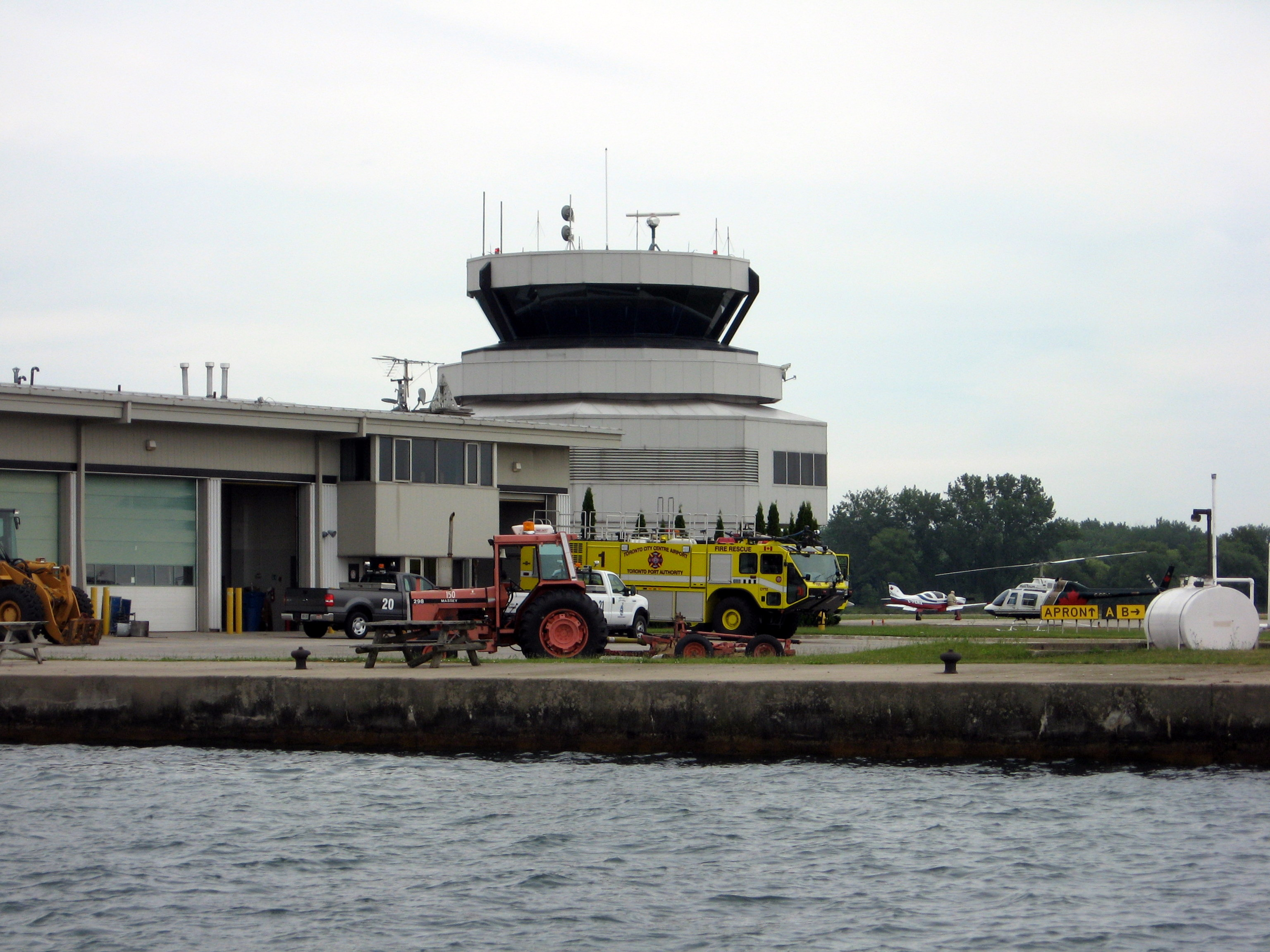
Control tower and fire station

Pedestrian access is provided by a pedestrian tunnel. Vehicular access to airport is provided by ferry. The airport owns two ferries: the 200-passenger ferry Marilyn Bell I, with the 150-passenger David Hornell V.C. as a backup vessel. The ferry transports vehicles for a fee and is free for passengers.

=== Porter Airlines corporate headquarters ===
The corporate headquarters of Porter Airlines is located on the airport property.

According to a TPA study, the airport employs approximately 1,900 persons. 84% of the positions are related to airlines and airlines servicing. Another 52 jobs are held in contract positions.

=== Ground run-up enclosure ===
In 2017, the airport opened a "Ground Run-Up Enclosure." After maintenance, plane operators must, by regulation, "run-up" their plane's turboprop engines to high thrust, creating a large amount of noise. The facility on the south side of the airport grounds, 14 metres (46 ft) in height, and 63 metres (207 ft) by 66 metres (217 ft) in area, is intended to dampen the noise of the tests. The facility cost CA$9 million.

=== Tenants and terminals ===
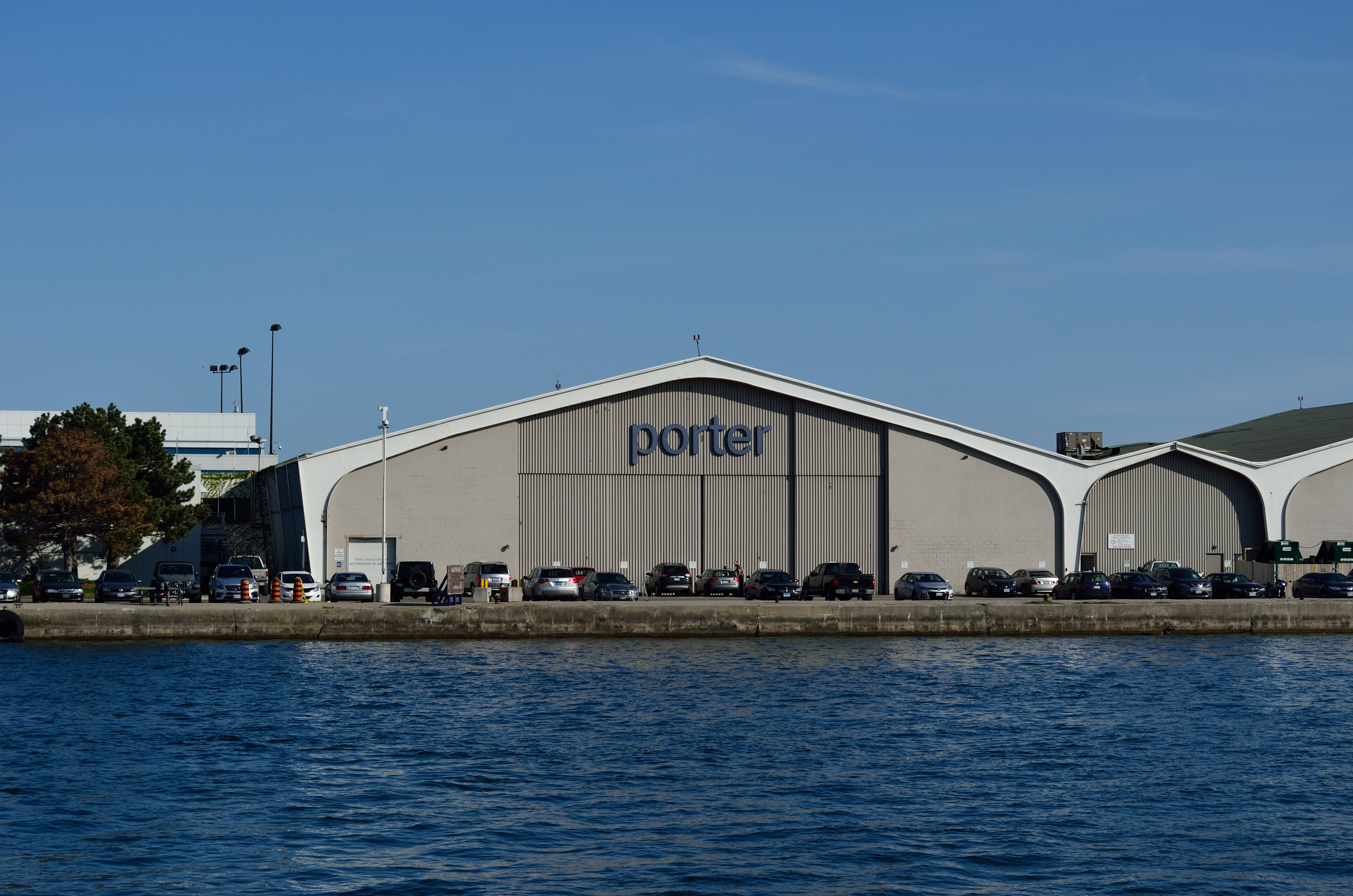
Porter Airlines hangar

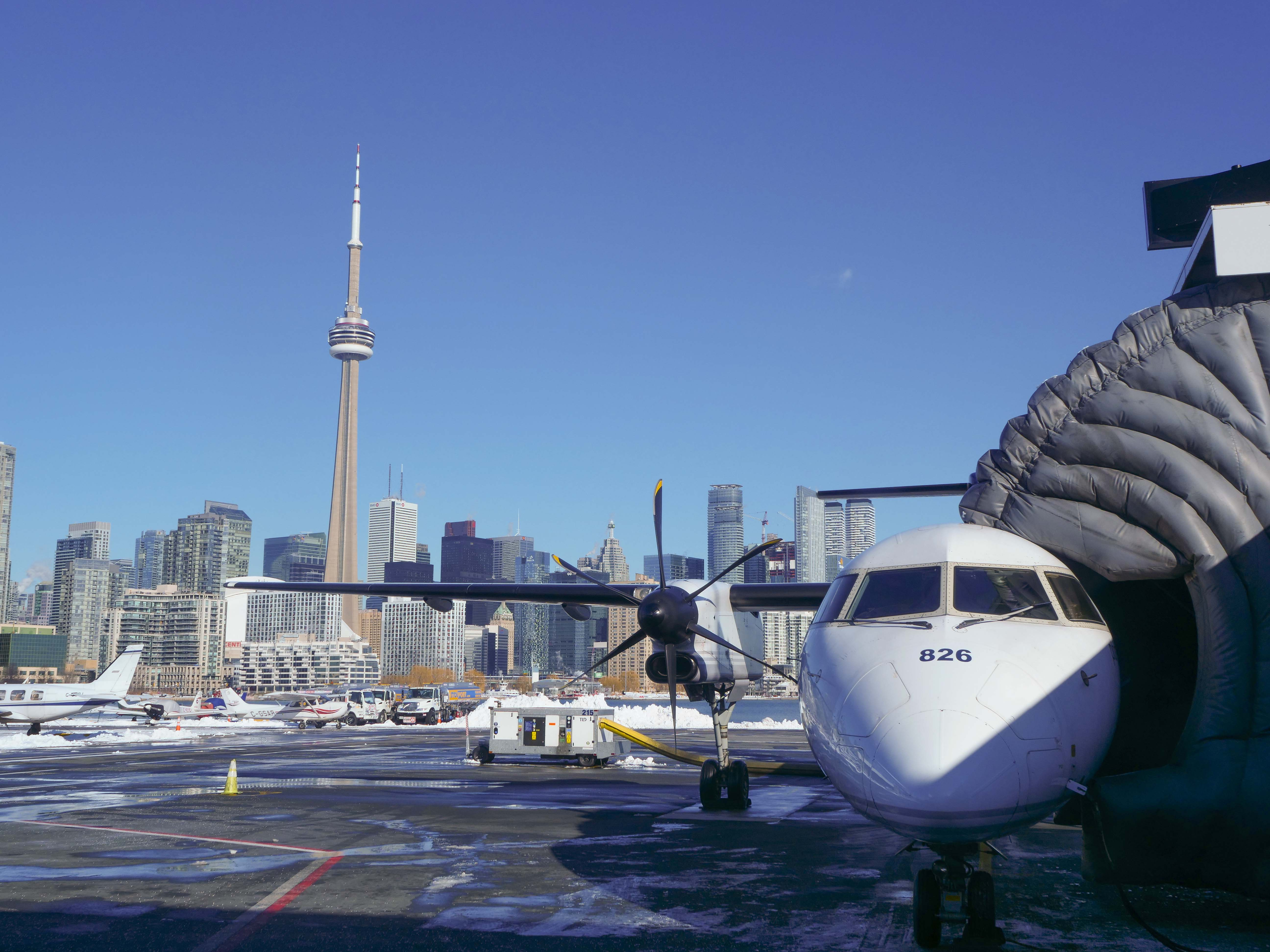
View of Toronto skyline from the terminal

There is one terminal and several hangars:

- Main terminal – Passenger terminal with a U.S border preclearance facility for commercial airline services (owned by Nieuport Aviation). It has 11 gates.
- Hangar 4A – Ornge
- Hangars 3 & 5 – Owned by Porter Airlines for aircraft maintenance and general airline services like catering and deicing.
- Hangars 4 & 6 – Porter FBO – home to Porter FBO and their tenants
- Hangar 1 – Stolport Corporation and Trans Capital FBO operate this hangar at the northeast end of the airport

Tenants include:

- Air Canada Express (operated by Jazz Aviation)
- Cameron Air Service
- Eagle Aircraft
- Greater Toronto Airways (Hangar 6)
- Island Air Flight School & Charters (Hangar 1)
- Ornge Transport Medicine (Ontario Air Ambulance/MOHLTC)
- Porter Airlines
- Trans Capital Air – air charters and FBO operations.
- (Others listed on the TPA web site)

=== Fire and rescue ===
The airport operates a fire and rescue service to deal with emergencies at the airport. The current apparatus at the airport consist of:

- 3 Oshkosh Striker 1500s
- Pierce Responder Pumper
- Ford F-250 Rescue

Toronto Police Service marine unit vessels and Toronto Fire Services fire boats (William Lyon Mackenzie and Sora) can provide rescue operations in the waters near the airport.

=== Jet fuel ===
Porter FBO provides 100LL and Jet Fuel A aviation fuel types.

== Statistics ==
=== Annual traffic ===
After an expansion in facilities, passenger volumes hit a peak in 2018 at 2.8 million. The COVID pandemic years dropped volume by 86%. It has since recovered, but is in decline from its 2018 peak.

Annual passenger traffic

Year	Passengers	% change
2010	1,130,625	Steady
2011	1,550,000	▲37.2%
2012	2,300,000	▲48.3%
2013	2,300,000	Steady
2014	2,400,000	▲4.3%
2015	2,500,000	▲4.2%
2016	2,700,000	▲9%
2017	2,800,000	▲3.7%

Year	Passengers	% change
2018	2,800,000	Steady
2019	2,774,000	▼1.2%
2020	389,000	▼86%
2021	282,000	▼27.5%
2022	1,732,000	▲514%
2023	2,036,000	▲17.6%
2024	2,020,000	▼1%
2025	1,760,000	▼13%

The island airport has recorded a decline in flights over the period from 2025 to 2026. Daily flights by Porter, which now bases itself at Pearson, declined from over 170 to about 50. The total daily flights averages at about 70 per day. This is in common with a general decline in flights from Canada to the United States over the same period. Additionally, Porter discontinued flights to Sudbury from Billy Bishop on May 1, 2026.

== See also ==
- List of airports in the Greater Toronto Area
- STOLport
