= Great Lakes Airlines (Canada) =

Canadian regional airline (1958–1983)

IATA	ICAO	Call sign
GX	—	—
- Founded: 1958
- Commenced operations: 1983 as Air Ontario Ltd
- Ceased operations: 1987 (merged with Austin Airways to form Air Ontario Inc.)
- Operating bases: Toronto Pearson International Airport
- Headquarters: Sarnia, Ontario, Canada
- Key people: John Blunt; Jim Plaxton; DeLuce family

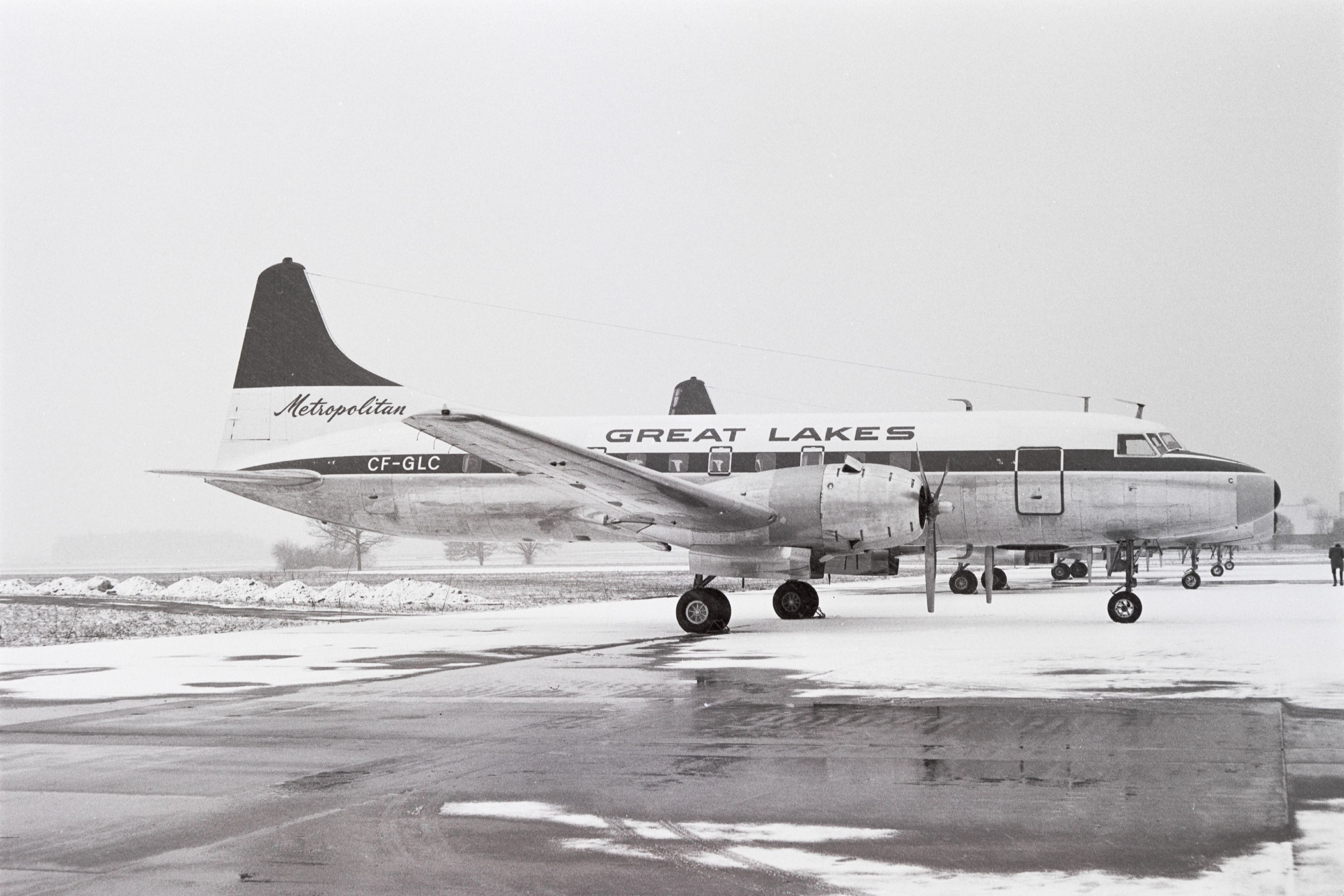
Convair 440

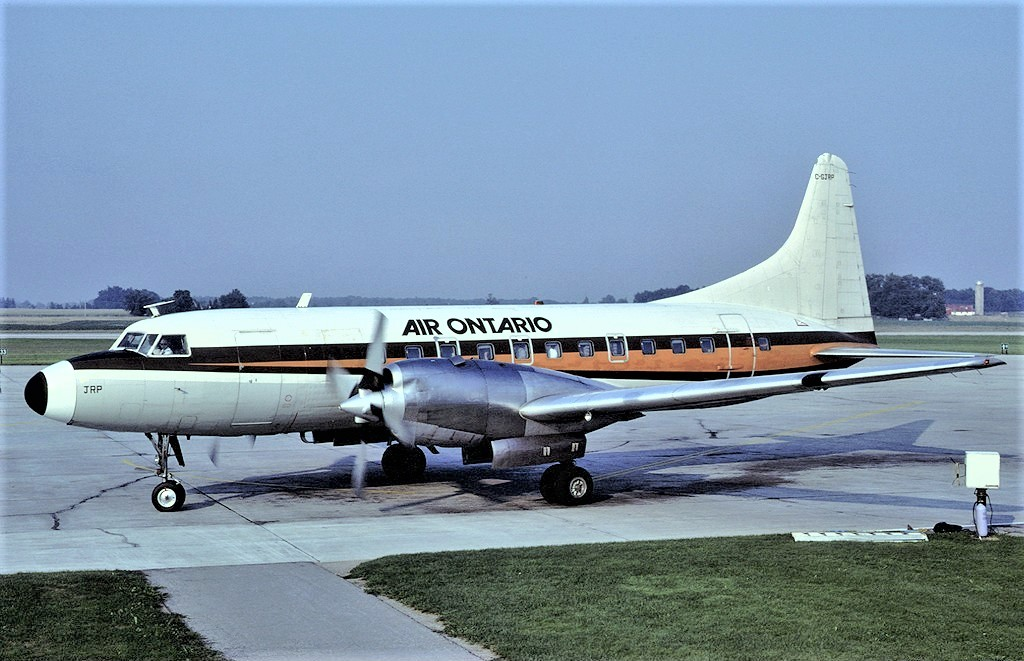
Convair 580 with Great Lakes Airlines cheatline in 1983

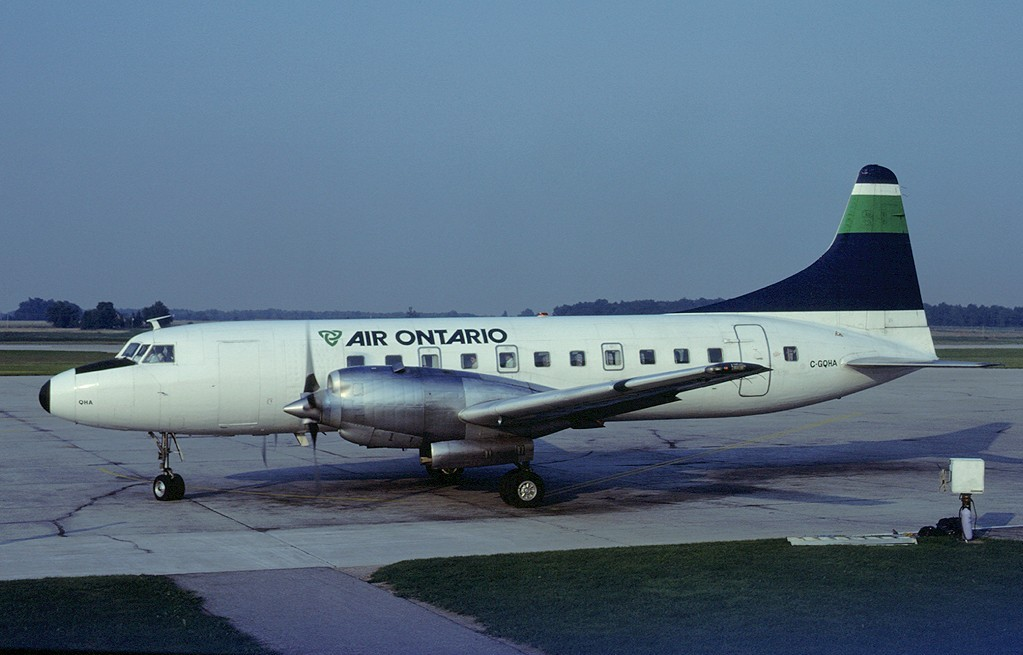
Convair 580 in 1983

Great Lakes Airlines was a regional airline in Canada. It was formed in 1958 in Sarnia, Ontario by John Blunt and by 1983 became Air Ontario Ltd. In June 1987 Air Ontario Ltd. merged with Austin Airways to form Air Ontario Inc. which in turn subsequently operated Air Canada Connector code sharing passenger flights on behalf of Air Canada with Convair 580 and de Havilland Canada DHC-8 Dash 8 series 100 and 300 turboprops. Air Ontario also operated Fokker F28 Fellowship jets at one point.

Aircraft in service with Great Lakes during the 1970s, being Convair 440 propliners and Convair 580 turboprops, were older and subject to vibrations during take-off, resulting in passengers nicknaming the company "Great Shakes". Convair 580 turboprops operated by Air Ontario prompted the nickname "Scare Ontario".

== Destinations in 1979 ==
Great Lakes Airlines was serving the following destinations in Ontario province in Canada with scheduled passenger flights operated with Convair aircraft in 1979:

- London, Ontario
- Ottawa, Ontario
- Peterborough, Ontario
- Sarnia, Ontario
- Toronto, Ontario

== See also ==
- List of defunct airlines of Canada
