= Robert Deluce =

Canadian businessman

Robert J. Deluce (born 9 April 1950) is a Canadian airline executive. He was the president and CEO of regional airline Porter Airlines, and has previously been an executive with Air Ontario and other airlines.

== Personal ==
Deluce was born as one of nine children to Stanley Matthew Deluce (1923–2010) and Angela Deluce in Chapleau, Ontario and raised in White River, Ontario.

His father served as a pilot with the Royal Canadian Air Force in the Second World War and in 1951 formed White River Air Service to fly summer tourists to Lake Superior.

Robert was a pilot with White River and maintains a commercial pilot's license.

The family next bought Austin Airways in 1971, then Air Ontario and Superior Airways in 1981. The Deluce family sold 75% of Air Ontario and Austin Airways to Air Canada in 1986.

Born to an aviation family, Deluce became a pilot in his teens and moved to Toronto to attend St. Michael's College School. He went to McGill University graduating with a Bachelor of Science degree. He then returned to the White River area and worked in the family's airline business.

Married to Catherine, the Deluces have four children. Son Michael is an executive with Porter. Daughter Justine is a real estate broker. Son Jason works in IT management. Son Brian works in aircraft maintenance.

His niece Lindsey Deluce is the news anchor for Your Morning on the CTV Television Network, which debuted in August 2016. She was formerly the news anchor for CP24 Breakfast. Lindsey joined CP24 in June 2009, as a remote host and anchor.

In 2006, Deluce graduated with a post graduate diploma in Broadcast Journalism from Seneca College at York University and was the recipient of an award for best overall radio and television newscaster.

Deluce lives in Forest Hill, Toronto with his family.

== Career ==
The Deluce family has over 50 years of experience in the airline business with White River Air Services, norOntair, Austin Airways, Air Creebec, Air Ontario, Air Manitoba, Air Alliance and Canada 3000 Airlines.

In 1988, the Deluce family started Canada 3000, initially as a subsidiary of British airline Air 2000. After British control of Air 2000 was rejected by the Canadian government, the Deluce family bought Air 2000's interest in the new airline, (selling their remaining 25% of Air Ontario) and named it Canada 3000. Deluce became president and CEO of Canada 3000, a position he held until 1995. His brother Peter was also an executive with Canada 3000.

In 2001, Deluce with partners formed REGCO Holdings to set up a competing regional airline at Toronto's Island Airport. The airport, which was losing money for its operator, the Toronto Port Authority (TPA) was seeking to expand its usage and increase revenues. Deluce proposed setting up a new airline using Bombardier turboprop aircraft to several cities within range of Toronto. The TPA, along with the City of Toronto government was then planning to build a new bridge to the island airport to facilitate the expansion. The bridge was cancelled by the City of Toronto and Deluce then sued the City and the Government of Canada, eventually settling out of court. Despite this, Deluce and the TPA continued to pursue the regional airline expansion plan. Regco purchased the terminal building at the airport being used by Air Canada Jazz and evicted them, freeing the space for his own airline. Porter Airlines launched in October 2006 with flights to Ottawa, Ontario and has expanded since. Porter flies to Toronto, Ottawa, Montreal, Quebec City, Moncton, Timmins, Windsor, Halifax, St. John’s, Thunder Bay, Sault Ste. Marie, Sudbury, New York City (Newark), Chicago (Midway), Boston (Logan), Washington (Dulles) and has seasonal flights to Mont Tremblant, Quebec; Burlington, Vermont; and Myrtle Beach, South Carolina.

He is also the president and CEO of Deluce Capital Corporation of Toronto. He is a past director of the Arthritis & Autoimmunity Research Centre of University Health Network and Vector Aerospace Corporation.

== Awards and honours ==
In 2017, Deluce was inducted into Canada's Aviation Hall of Fame.
