= Air Ontario =

Regional airline of Canada (1987–2001)

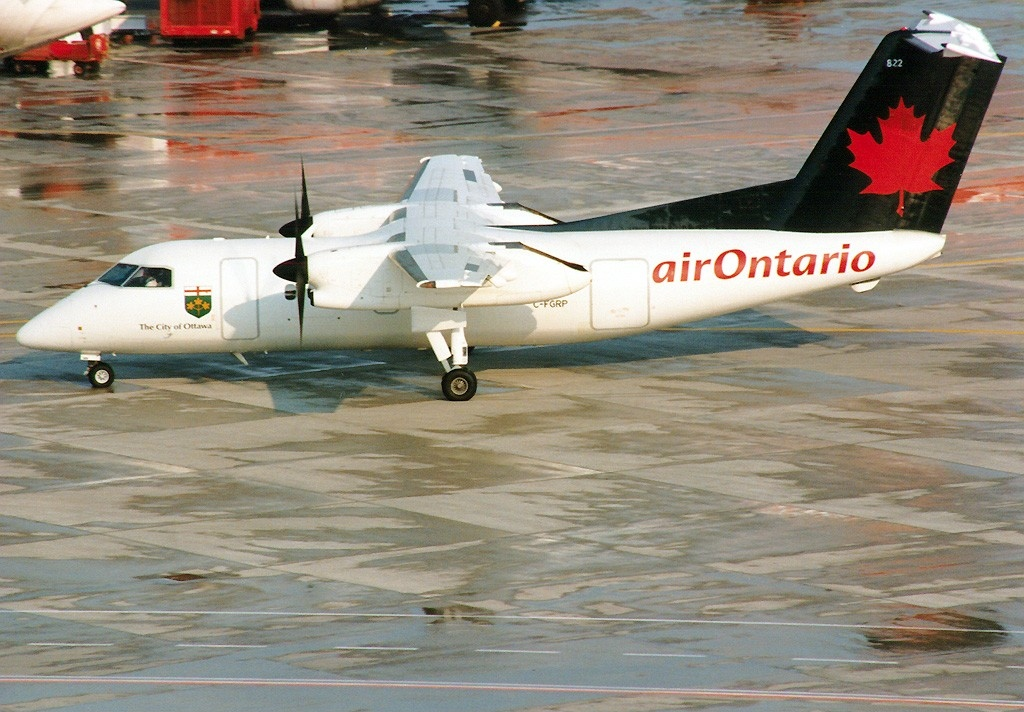
IATA	ICAO	Call sign
GX	ONT	ONTARIO
- Founded: 1958; 68 years ago (as Great Lakes Airlines)
- Commenced operations: 1983; 43 years ago (as Air Ontario Ltd.); 1987; 39 years ago (as Air Ontario Inc.)
- Ceased operations: November 1, 2001; 25 years ago (merged with Air BC, Air Nova and Canadian Regional Airlines to form Air Canada Jazz)
- Hubs: Toronto Pearson International Airport
- Frequent-flyer program: Aeroplan
- Alliance: Star Alliance (affiliate; 1997–2001)
- Parent company: Air Canada
- Headquarters: Sarnia, Ontario (1958–1977); London, Ontario (1977–2001)

Air Ontario Inc. was a Canadian regional airline with its predecessor (Great Lakes Airlines) initially headquartered in Sarnia and later in London, Ontario. In 2002, Air Ontario became Air Canada Jazz.

== History ==
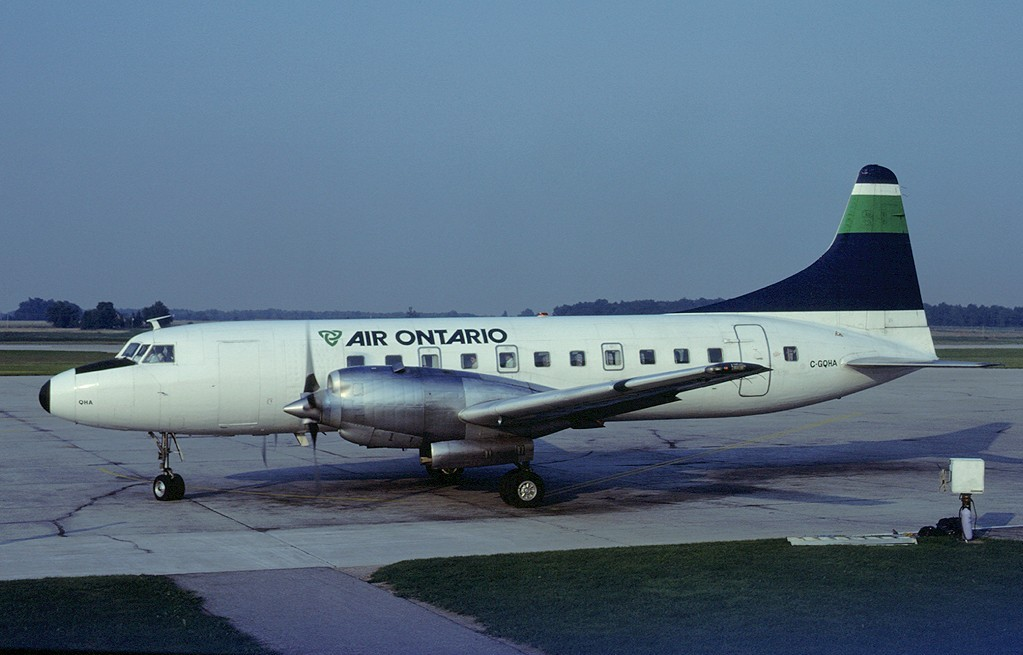
Air Ontario Convair 580 at London International Airport, Ontario, 1983

Great Lakes Airlines, the predecessor of Air Ontario, was formed in 1958 and based in Sarnia, becoming Air Ontario Ltd. in 1983 and Air Ontario Inc. in June 1987. In 1969, Great Lakes was only operating between Sarnia and Toronto as an independent air carrier with just two roundtrip nonstop flights primarily flown on weekdays with Douglas DC-3 aircraft. Also in 1969, the airline began acquiring Convair 440 piston powered airliners configured with 44 passenger seats in order to replace the DC-3 aircraft and also to expand scheduled passenger service to other destinations in Ontario province such as London, Ottawa, Kitchener and Peterborough.

However, by 1975 Great Lakes was in financial trouble which resulted in the Sarnia - Toronto route being the only scheduled passenger service operated at this time and also led to the airline being purchased by a partnership consisting of a group of Toronto businessmen including James Plaxton, who brought in new capital from the DeLuce family when he merged Great Lakes with their Austin Airways operation. In 1977, the airline moved its headquarters from Sarnia to London, Ontario and also purchased Flightexec Ltd. which was based in London and operated executive charters with Piper Aztec twin prop business aircraft with Great Lakes continuing to operate Flightexec as a separate air carrier. During the late 1970s, the airline had once again expanded and was serving five cities in Ontario province including Toronto, Ottawa, London, ON, Peterborough, ON and Sarnia with up to ten roundtrip nonstop flights being operated every weekday on the core Toronto - London route in 1977. By early 1981, Great Lakes was still operating as an independent air carrier with service to four cities in Ontario province including Toronto, Ottawa, London and Sarnia with all flights being operated at this time with Convair 580 turboprops configured with 55 passenger seats.

By the fall of 1981, the airline had changed its name and was operating as Air Ontario which in turn continued to serve Toronto, Ottawa, London, ON and Sarnia as an independent air carrier operating Convair 580 turboprops. In the summer of 1986 Air Ontario was serving eleven destinations in Canada as an independent regional air carrier including Toronto, Montreal, Ottawa, Winnipeg, Windsor, ON, Thunder Bay, Sault Ste. Marie, ON, Sudbury, ON, North Bay, ON, London, ON and Sarnia plus two destinations in the U.S., being Cleveland and Hartford with the airline also ordering new de Havilland Canada DHC-8 Dash 8 turboprops at this time. Also in 1986, Air Canada and Pacific Western Airlines equally split 49% of the shares of Air Ontario. In 1987, Air Canada and Austin Airways split the Air Ontario shares in a 3:1 ratio upon its Canadian incorporation. Both Air Ontario and Austin Airways were operating Air Canada Connector (now known as Jazz Aviation) services on behalf of Air Canada in 1987 with Air Ontario flying Convair 580 and new Dash 8 turboprops at this time.

By the late 1980s, Air Ontario was operating Fokker F28 Fellowship jets as well as Dash 8 turboprops on Air Canada Connector services. According to the Official Airline Guide (OAG), one of the first F28 jet routes operated by Air Ontario on behalf of Air Canada was nonstop service between Toronto and Sault Ste. Marie, Ontario with four roundtrip F28 flights being operated every weekday in December 1988. Also according to this same Dec. 1, 1988 OAG, these nonstop Air Ontario F28 flights between Toronto and Sault Ste. Marie had replaced Air Canada's mainline jet service on the route with Air Ontario competing at this time with Canadian Airlines International mainline Boeing 737-200 nonstop jet service between the two cities. By early 1989, the airline was also operating Air Canada Connector service with an F28 jet on a roundtrip routing of Thunder Bay - Dryden - Winnipeg with this flight being involved in fatal accident on take-off from Dryden in March of that year (see Accidents and incidents section below).

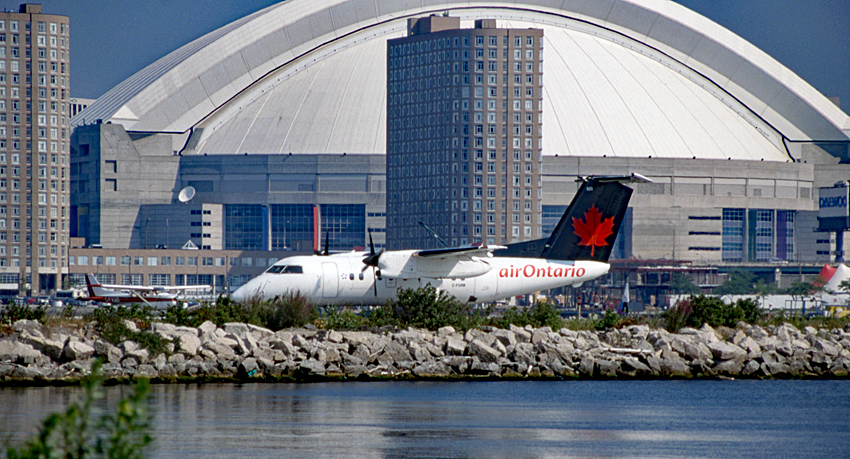
Air Ontario C-FGRM DHC-8-100 at Toronto Island Airport in 1999

As a wholly owned subsidiary of Air Canada, Air Ontario's operation as an Air Canada Connector code sharing partner increased substantially in the intra-Ontario marketplace following Air Canada's decision in February 1990, to discontinue mainline jet service to North Bay, Sudbury, Timmins and Windsor. Route expansion from Toronto Island Airport (now known as Billy Bishop Toronto City Airport) nonstop to both Montreal and Ottawa as well as nonstop to Newark, NJ in the U.S. soon followed, along with the addition of other new routes into the United States from Toronto Pearson International Airport.

In December 2000, Air Ontario was amalgamated into Air Canada.

In January 2001, a newly merged carrier called Air Canada Regional Inc. was established. A wholly owned subsidiary of Air Canada, this company combined the individual strengths of four regional airlines—Air BC, Air Nova, Air Ontario, and Canadian Regional Airlines. Consolidation of these four companies was completed in 2002 and was marked by the launch of a new name and brand—Air Canada Jazz.

== Fleet ==
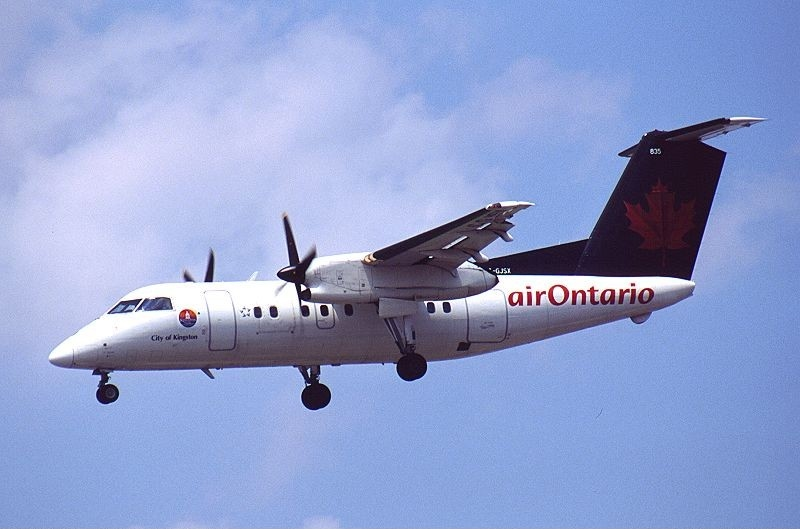
Air Ontario DHC8-102 Dash 8

Air Ontario operated the following aircraft:

Air Ontario fleet
Aircraft	Total	Introduced	Retired	Notes
Convair 580	10	1981	1989	Fleet included aircraft formerly operated by Great Lakes Airlines. Replaced with Fokker F28 Fellowship and new de Havilland DHC-8 Dash 8 aircraft.
de Havilland Canada DHC-8-100 Dash 8	33	1986	2002	Aircraft transferred to Air Canada Jazz
de Havilland Canada DHC-8-300 Dash 8	6	1989	2002	Aircraft transferred to Air Canada Jazz
Fokker F28 Fellowship	2	1988	1989	Only jet aircraft operated by the airline

The airline acquired two Fokker F28 Fellowship series 1000 jets from Turkish Airlines in 1987, with both entering service in 1988 under registrations C-FONG and C-FONF, the latter of which was destroyed in a crash at Dryden Regional Airport in 1989.

Air Ontario was also operating a Hawker Siddeley HS 748 turboprop aircraft in 1988.

== Destinations ==
=== Destinations in 1984 ===
Air Ontario was operating a small fleet of Convair 580 turboprops (later replaced with Fokker F28 Fellowship jets beginning in late 1988 and also with new Dash 8 turboprops) as an independent air carrier in 1984 with scheduled passenger service to the following destinations in the Canadian provinces of Ontario and Quebec as well as to two destinations in the United States:

Ontario

- London — London International Airport
- Ottawa — Ottawa Macdonald–Cartier International Airport
- Sarnia — Sarnia Chris Hadfield Airport
- Sudbury — Sudbury Airport
- Toronto — Toronto Pearson International Airport

Quebec

- Montréal — Montréal Dorval International Airport

United States

- Cleveland, Ohio — Cleveland Hopkins International Airport
- Hartford, Connecticut — Bradley International Airport

=== Destinations in 1992 ===
Air Ontario was operating Air Canada Connector service via a code sharing agreement with Air Canada to the following destinations in Canada and the United States in 1992; by 1995, Air Ontario had added nonstop Air Canada Connector service between Toronto and Baltimore and was operating all flights system-wide with de Havilland Canada DHC-8 Dash 8 turboprop aircraft.

Manitoba

- Winnipeg — Winnipeg James Armstrong Richardson International Airport

Ontario

- London — London International Airport
- North Bay — North Bay/Jack Garland Airport
- Ottawa — Ottawa Macdonald–Cartier International Airport
- Sarnia — Sarnia Chris Hadfield Airport
- Sault Ste. Marie — Sault Ste. Marie Airport
- Sudbury — Sudbury Airport
- Thunder Bay — Thunder Bay International Airport
- Timmins — Timmins/Victor M. Power Airport
- Toronto
  - Billy Bishop Toronto City Airport
  - Toronto Pearson International Airport
- Windsor — Windsor International Airport

Quebec

- Montréal — Montréal Dorval International Airport

United States

- Baltimore, Maryland — Baltimore/Washington International Thurgood Marshall Airport (service initiated in 1995)
- Cleveland, Ohio — Cleveland Hopkins International Airport
- Hartford, Connecticut — Bradley International Airport
- Newark, New Jersey — Newark Liberty International Airport (nonstop service to and from Billy Bishop Toronto City Airport)

=== Destinations in 2000 ===
Air Ontario was operating a hub at the Toronto Pearson International Airport in the spring of 2000 as an Air Canada Connector code sharing air carrier on behalf of its owner Air Canada and had greatly expanded its transborder services to the United States. The following cities in Canada and the U.S. were being served at this time primarily via nonstop service to and from Toronto with all flights being operated with Dash 8 turboprops.

Ontario

- Kingston — Kingston Norman Rogers Airport
- London — London International Airport
- North Bay — North Bay/Jack Garland Airport
- Ottawa — Ottawa Macdonald–Cartier International Airport
- Sarnia — Sarnia Chris Hadfield Airport
- Sault Ste. Marie — Sault Ste. Marie Airport
- Sudbury — Sudbury Airport
- Timmins — Timmins Victor M. Power Airport
- Toronto — Toronto Pearson International Airport — Hub in support of Air Canada
- Windsor — Windsor International Airport

Quebec

- Montreal — Montréal Dorval International Airport

United States

- Akron, Ohio — Akron–Canton Airport
- Albany, New York — Albany International Airport
- Allentown — Lehigh Valley International Airport
- Baltimore, Maryland — Baltimore/Washington International Thurgood Marshall Airport
- Cleveland, Ohio — Cleveland Hopkins International Airport
- Columbus, Ohio — John Glenn Columbus International Airport
- Dayton, Ohio — Dayton International Airport
- Detroit, Michigan — Detroit Metropolitan Wayne County Airport
- Grand Rapids, Michigan — Gerald R. Ford International Airport
- Harrisburg, Pennsylvania — Harrisburg International Airport
- Hartford, Connecticut — Bradley International Airport
- Louisville, Kentucky — Louisville Muhammad Ali International Airport
- Providence, Rhode Island — Rhode Island T. F. Green International Airport
- Richmond, Virginia — Richmond International Airport
- Rochester, New York — Greater Rochester International Airport
- Syracuse, New York — Syracuse Hancock International Airport

== Accidents and incidents ==
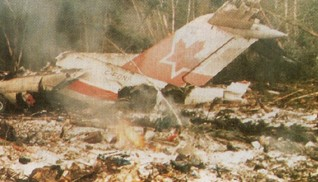
- The wreckage of Air Ontario Flight 1363
  On 1 November 1988, A Douglas C-47A (registered C-FBJE) crashed into Pikangikum Lake on a domestic cargo flight from Red Lake Airport to Pikangikum Airport. Two of the three people on board were killed.
- On March 10, 1989, Air Ontario Flight 1363, a Fokker F28-1000 Fellowship twin jet, (registration C-FONF) crashed near Dryden, Ontario immediately after take-off en route from Dryden to Winnipeg. This caused the death of 21 of 65 passengers and 3 of 4 crew members. Following the crash, Air Ontario subsequently removed the remaining F28 jet (registration C-FONG) from its fleet later in 1989 and thus became an all Dash 8 turboprop operator at that time.

== See also ==
- List of defunct airlines of Canada
