= Austin Airways =

Airline of Canada (1934–1987)

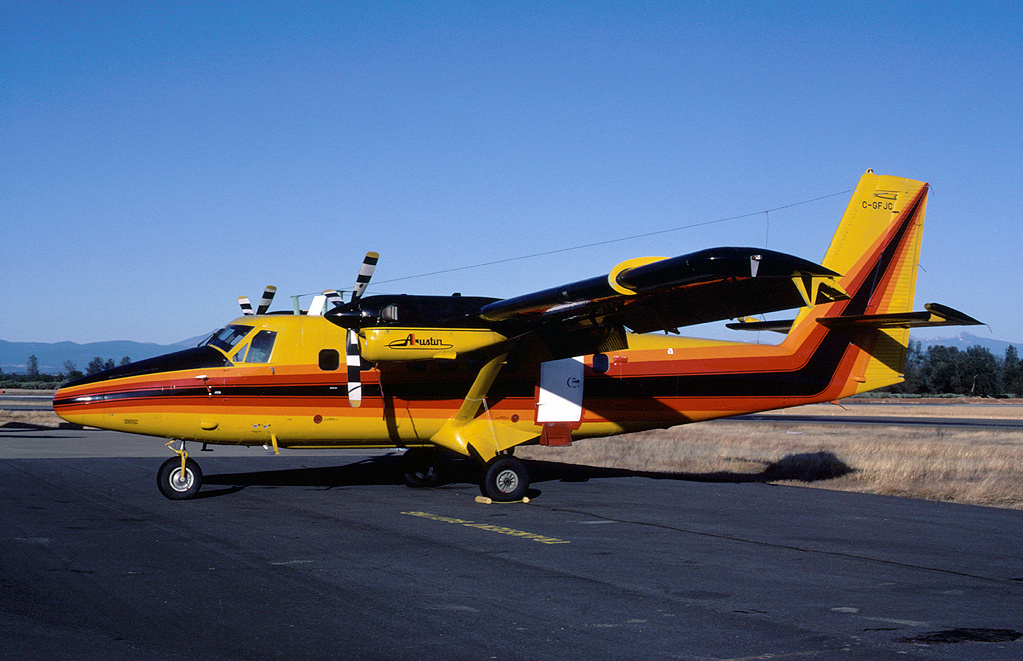
- de Havilland Canada DHC-6 Twin Otter in 1983
IATA	ICAO	Call sign
-	AAW	AUSTIN
- Founded: 1934 as Capreol and Austin Air Services
- Ceased operations: June 1987 (Note: merged with Air Ontario Ltd. to form Air Ontario Inc.)
- Fleet size: See Aircraft used below
- Destinations: 45 (Across history)
- Headquarters: Timmins, Ontario, Canada

Austin Airways was a passenger airline and freight carrier based in Timmins, Ontario.

== History ==
Established as Capreol and Austin Air Services was one of Canada's oldest airlines, starting operations in 1934. The home base was Timmins and it operated many duties in addition to passenger and freight services. Over the years, scheduled services served over 40 cities, including one destination in the United States. In 1973 it merged with White River Air Services but continued to operate as Austin Airways.

In June 1987 it merged with Air Ontario Ltd (formerly Great Lakes Airlines, formed in 1958) to form Air Ontario Inc. In turn Air Ontario became part of Air Canada Jazz in 2001.

Austin Airways 1985 route map

The April 26, 1987 Air Ontario/Austin Airways joint system timetable listed Air Canada Connector code share flights operated by both airlines on behalf of Air Canada with Austin Airways operating 14-passenger Beechcraft 99, 7-passenger Cessna 402, 19-passenger de Havilland Canada DHC-6 Twin Otter, 37-passenger de Havilland Canada DHC-8 Dash 8 and 40 to 43-passenger Hawker Siddeley HS 748 aircraft at this time. The HS 748 turboprop was the largest aircraft operated by Austin Airways.

== Historical fleet ==
Over its long history, Austin Airways operated the following aircraft:

- Beech 99 (turboprop)
- Cessna Citation (business jet)
- Cessna 402
- Consolidated PBY Canso (amphibian aircraft)
- de Havilland Canada DHC-2 Beaver
- de Havilland Canada DHC-3 Otter
- de Havilland Canada DHC-6 Twin Otter (STOL capable turboprop)
- Douglas DC-3 (includes C-47 model)
- Hawker Siddeley HS 748 (turboprop)

== Destinations ==
The following destinations were served by Austin Airways during its existence. Most of the destinations served by the airline were isolated and remote airports in northern Ontario and Quebec provinces as well as in the Northwest Territories (NWT) (now Nunavut) in Canada in addition to several larger airports across Ontario. Minneapolis/St. Paul in the U.S. was the only non-Canadian destination served by the airline during its existence.

=== Ontario Province ===
- Attawapiskat, Ontario
- Bear Lake, Ontario
- Bearskin Lake, Ontario
- Big Trout Lake, Ontario
- Cochrane, Ontario
- Fort Albany, Ontario
- Fort Hope, Ontario
- Fort Severn, Ontario - most northerly destination
- Geraldton, Ontario
- Kapuskasing, Ontario
- Kasabonika Lake, Ontario
- Kashechewan First Nation, Ontario
- Kenora, Ontario
- Lansdowne House, Ontario
- Manitouwadge, Ontario
- Marathon, Ontario
- Moosonee, Ontario
- Nakina, Ontario
- Pickle Lake, Ontario
- Pikangikum, Ontario
- Red Lake, Ontario
- Round Lake, Ontario
- Sachigo Lake, Ontario
- Sandy Lake, Ontario
- Sioux Lookout, Ontario
- Sudbury, Ontario
- Thunder Bay, Ontario
- Timmins, Ontario - location of company headquarters
- Toronto, Ontario
- Trenton, Ontario
- Webequie First Nation, Ontario
- Windsor, Ontario - most southerly destination
- Winisk, Ontario

=== Quebec Province ===
- Akulivik, Quebec
- Eastmain, Quebec
- Fort George (now Chisasibi, Quebec)
- Fort Rupert, Quebec
- Great Whale (now Kuujjuarapik, Quebec)
- Inukjuak, Quebec
- Ivujivik, Quebec
- Povungnituk, Quebec
- Rupert House (now Waskaganish, Quebec)
- Sugluk (now Salluit, Quebec)

=== Nunavut ===
Formerly part of the Northwest Territories

- Cape Dorset
- Sanikiluaq

=== U.S. ===
- Minneapolis/St. Paul, Minnesota - only U.S. destination

== Accidents and incidents ==
- On 9 January 1964 Douglas C-47 CF-ILQ crashed 50 minutes after take-off on a cargo flight from Moosonee to Nemiscan Settlement, Ontario. Both pilots were seriously injured, but were pulled from the aircraft 4–5 days later by a search and rescue party and ultimately survived. It was determined that the crash was caused by fuel deprivation leading to engine failure of both of the aircraft's engines. To this day, the hulk of the aircraft still sits where it had crashed in 1964, despite being partially salvaged, and burned from a forest fire that swept across the area in the mid-1980s.
- On 9 November 1969, Douglas C-47B CF-AAL crashed on approach to Timmins, Ontario killing two of the four people on board. The aircraft was operating a domestic flight from Winisk, Ontario.
- On 19 June 1970, Douglas C-47A CF-AAC was written off in an accident at Val-d'Or, Quebec.
- On 4 September 1976, DHC-3 CF-MIT struck power lines in the Abitibi Canyon near Fraserdale, Ontario in below VFR conditions, with loss of all 10 people on board, the worst accident in the airline's history.
- On 10 December 1976, Douglas C-47A C-FIAX crashed on take-off from Chisasibi, Quebec. All eight people on board survived.
- On 19 January 1986, Douglas C-47A C-GNNA struck a 150 feet (46 m) high Non-directional beacon tower and crashed at Sachigo Lake Airport, Ontario. After clipping the top of the tower, the pilot lost use of ailerons, and the plane began flipping over. He used the rudder to correct, spotted the runway, and made a controlled crash landing. The pilot saved all five on board with his actions, but he himself suffered two crushed vertebrae.

== See also ==
- List of defunct airlines of Canada

== Bibliography ==
- Milberry, L. (1985). Austin Airways. Toronto (ONT.): Canav Books.
