= Pem-Air =

Pem-Air / Trillium Air
IATA	ICAO	Call sign
PD	PEM	PEM-AIR
- Founded: 1970
- Ceased operations: 2002
- Hubs: Pembroke Airport, Toronto Pearson
- Secondary hubs: Gatineau Airport, Kitchener Airport, Sudbury Airport
- Focus cities: Pembroke Airport; Ottawa Macdonald–Cartier; Toronto-Pearson
- Frequent-flyer program: formerly Canadian Plus
- Alliance: Canadian Partner
- Fleet size: 14 (2001)
- Destinations: 12
- Parent company: PEM-AIR Limited
- Headquarters: Pembroke, Ontario
- Key people: Del O'Brien, President, Jason O'Brien General Manager, Dick Wigston Ops, Denis Banville Chief Engineer Steve Mayjak Chief Pilot, .... John Smithman, Chief Pilot; (1969-1970)
- Employees: 47
- Website: pemair.ca

Pem-Air (from 1970 until 2002) was an aviation company based out of the Pembroke Airport.

== History ==
Pem-Air began flying as a Class II scheduled airline in 1970. Its first employee was John Smithman, a former RCAF pilot from Montreal, who had been flying as a captain with RoyalAir Ltd. a short-service airline based at the Montreal's Dorval airport. RoyalAir had been providing passenger services for Pembroke until it went bankrupt in 1969. John was a captain with RoyalAir and when he heard that Del O'Brien, a Pembroke Lawyer and 9 other investors wanted to build an airline to replace RoyalAir's services, he drove to Pembroke to meet with Del O'Brien. He offered to help Del and his partners obtain the appropriate licenses from Canada's Ministry of Transportation.

Within a few months, the licenses were issued and the airline began flying daily flights to and from Toronto. They purchased one Beech 18 aircraft and leased another as backup from St. Catherines' Meisner brothers. John hired and trained 3 pilots to provide the four pilot crew needed to fly two flights a day to Toronto.

Three events were significant for promoting the new airline.

1. Stubby Ross, owner of TimeAir Ltd., an Albertan Class II airline based in Lethbridge Alberta called John one day and offered to help in any way that he could. Stubby offered a Beech 18 aircraft at an affordable price. John, along with Pembroke Airport Manager Dick Wigston, flew to Lethbridge to pick up the aircraft and fly it back to Pembroke for painting with the white and blue colours of Pem-Air.

2. After receiving a call from John Smithman, Air Canada agreed to include Pem-Air in their media event promoting their new Boeing 747 aircraft in 1970 at the Toronto Pearson Airport. "We took our new stewardess Carol Suter in her attractive light blue uniform with us to Toronto and parked our beautiful small aircraft under the right wing of the 747 for press photos. The photos showed up in newspapers across Canada as an example of Canada's biggest and smallest airlines," commented John. "Air Canada rewarded our crew by taking us up for a spin over Toronto in their brand new 747 that day."

3. After hiring pilots Bud Mason, George Staples and Myron Sikora, John conducted type training by taking them up to fly formation over Pembroke to promote the arrival of Pem-Air to Pembroke. Within 3 years, passenger loads had climbed to 2000 a month; and the airline was established. Our biggest clients were Petawawa Army Base, Chalk River Atomic Energy, and Eddy Match Company.

4. After many years of successful operations, Jason O'Brien became General Manager in 1994. The Airline started an expansion phase first into northern Ontario where a fleet of 3 Piper - Navaho Chieftains which connected Kirkland lake Earlton, Elliot lake, Horne Payne, Wawa, Sault Ste. Marie and Rouyn-Noranda on a daily scheduled service into Sudbury and later directly to Toronto Pearson. With the continued success of routes between (with 3 King Air turboprop Beechcraft) Gatineau and Quebec City, and Pembroke to Toronto a new airline was formed with new investors. Trillium Air Launched service between Ottawa and Kitchener Waterloo in 1999 with the larger Jetstream 31. A second Jetstream was brought into service and preparations were made to enter a service between Kitchener Waterloo and Montreal. At this point PEM-AIR was operating 34 flights daily. There were also charter flights and many contracts including with the Quebec Government as the 'bird dog' in the fire fighting operations which travelled across Canada and into the US. PEM-AIR had its own AMO and did all training of pilots inhouse.

5. During the same time the Flight School expanded greatly including 5 Cessna 172 and an Aztec F twin. With brokers in Japan, Austria and France the flight school actually had an inhouse ESL program and pilot apartment to help with the transition. Adding to this success Instructor Trevor Miller and GM Jason O'Brien approached Algonquin College with a proposal to create a professional pilot program with the college. The pilots were able to work through the ranks at PEM-AIR all the way to flighting commercial aircraft in to Toronto Pearson. This program still continues.

After 31 years, in 2001, the company ended all its routes between Pembroke, Ontario and Toronto Pearson International Airport, after dropping traffic levels with Atomic Energy of Canada (that was responsible for two-thirds of its business at Pembroke) the tech bubble that burst in Kitchener Waterloo, the commercial airline services were discontinued to refocus on its flight school an aviation service operated jointly in partnership with Algonquin College. Over its 31-year history the airline operated several other routes for shorter periods of time including flights from Ottawa to Kitchener; Ottawa to Hamilton

== See also ==
- List of defunct airlines of Canada
