= Toronto Environmental Alliance =

Canadian environmental group

The Toronto Environmental Alliance (TEA) is a Canadian non-profit environmental organization. Formed in 1988, TEA provides an activist voice on environmental issues affecting Toronto, Ontario.

== Mandate ==
Since 1989, the Toronto Environmental Alliance (TEA) has campaigned locally to find solutions to Toronto's urban environmental problems. Its mission is to promote a greener Toronto and its vision is a green, healthy and equitable city with economic activity that sustains our environment. TEA works with concerned individuals, community groups, professionals and workers, encouraging the participation of local people on local issues. TEA acts as an environmental watchdog at Toronto City Hall. In April 2012, TEA adopted a new tagline: "a greener Toronto for all".

== Organization ==
The Toronto Environmental Alliance is governed by a 9-member volunteer board of directors. Emmay Mah is the executive director.

== Focus areas ==
TEA focuses on five major subjects:

- Smog, Global warming, and Energy
- Public Transit
- Toxics
- Waste Reduction
- Greenbelt

== Publications ==
A selection of TEA reports:

- Leaping to 80: A Plan for City Hall to Help Torontonians Divert More Waste
- 2012 Council Report Card - Going in Circles
- Toronto The Green: Mid-Term Environmental Report Card 2008
- Dig Conservation, Not Holes: A report on the GTA's Thirst for Gravel and How to Quench it.
