= Porter Airlines =

Canadian airline headquartered in Toronto

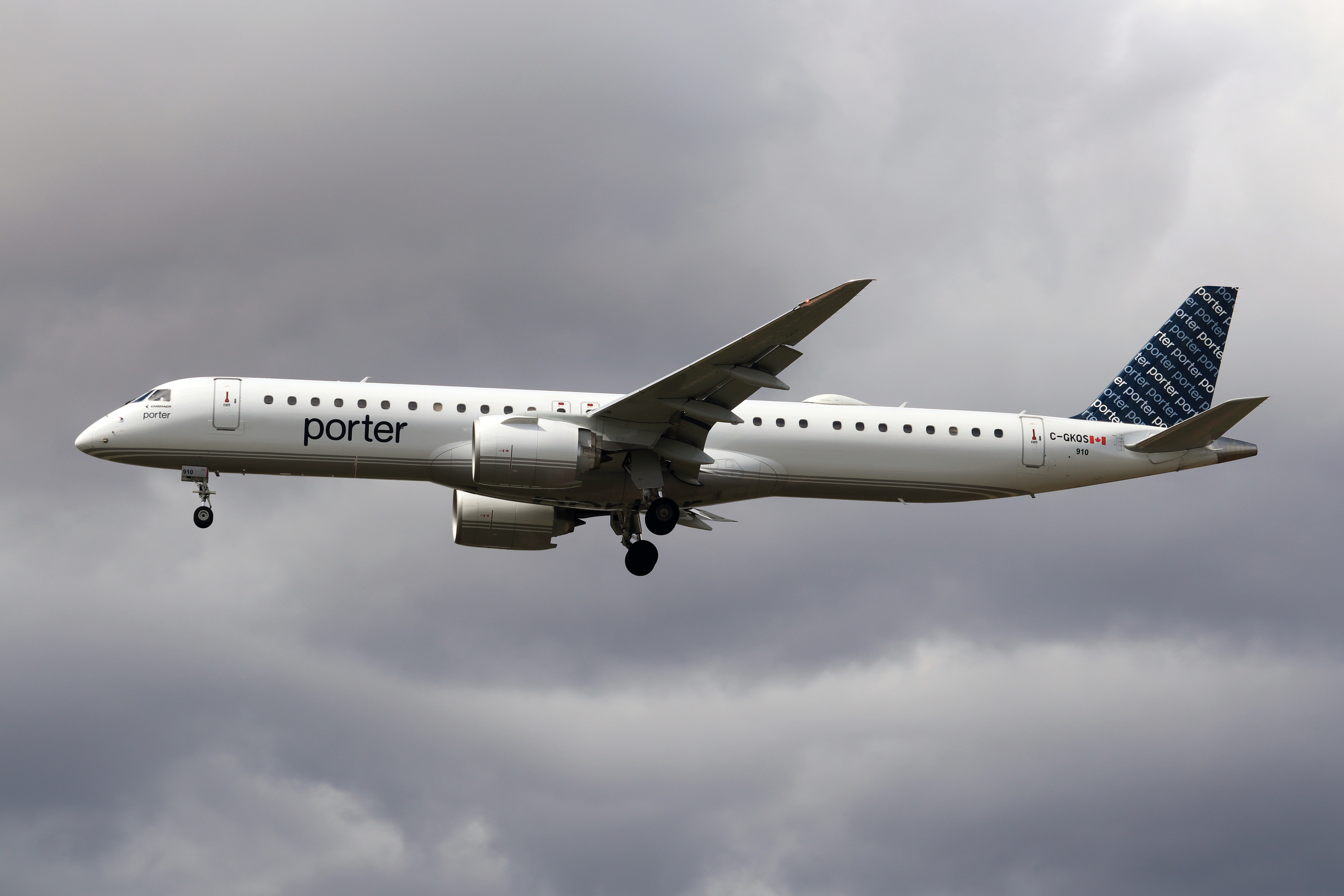
- Porter Airlines Embraer E195-E2
| IATA | ICAO | Call sign |
|---|---|---|
| PD; P3 | POE; PTR | PORTER AIR; DASH PORT |
- Founded: February 2, 2006; 20 years ago
- Commenced operations: October 23, 2006; 20 years ago
- AOC #: Canada: 15266, 19543; United States: P54F185F
- Hubs: Ottawa; Toronto–Billy Bishop; Toronto–Pearson
- Focus cities: Halifax; Montréal–Trudeau
- Frequent-flyer program: VIPorter
- Fleet size: 83
- Destinations: 32
- Parent company: Porter Aviation Holdings Inc.
- Headquarters: Billy Bishop Toronto City Airport, Toronto, Ontario, Canada
- Key people: Michael Deluce (CEO); Kevin Jackson (president); Robert Deluce (executive chairman); Donald J. Carty (chairman)
- Website: www.flyporter.com

Porter Airlines (stylized in all lowercase as porter) is a Canadian airline headquartered at Billy Bishop Toronto City Airport ('Toronto–Billy Bishop') in Toronto, Ontario, Canada. It is the third largest airline in Canada behind Air Canada and WestJet. Owned by Porter Aviation Holdings, formerly known as REGCO Holdings Inc., Porter operates regularly scheduled flights from its bases in Eastern Canada, primarily Ottawa Macdonald–Cartier International Airport, Toronto–Billy Bishop, and Toronto Pearson International Airport ('Toronto–Pearson'), to locations across North America using a fleet of De Havilland Canada DHC-8-400 turboprop and Embraer E195-E2 jet aircraft.

== History ==
Porter's operation at Toronto–Billy Bishop, located on the Toronto Islands near downtown was launched in 2006 with some controversy. Robert Deluce, who is now the executive chairman of Porter Airlines, proposed creating a regional airline using Bombardier turboprop aircraft to service major cities of Canada within the range of Toronto. A planned bridge to the airport was cancelled in 2003, leading to lawsuits between Deluce and the City of Toronto. The airline lost the case in court, but the idea for the airline remained. With the compensation received from the Toronto Port Authority for the lawsuit, REGCO bought the island airport terminal used by Air Canada Jazz and terminated Air Canada's access. To accommodate Porter's expansion, Toronto–Billy Bishop opened a new, larger passenger terminal in March 2010.

From 2010 to 2012, Porter partnered with Bombardier Aerospace and Pratt & Whitney Canada to explore aviation biofuels. This culminated in flying once from Toronto to Ottawa on a 50/50 blend of biofuel and jet fuel, the first such commercial example in Canada. Two months later, Air Canada ran a 50/50 flight also, but there have been relatively few such flights since. In 2022, the Canadian government compelled airlines to lower their emissions, and as of 2023, more 50/50 flights are expected.

In 2013, Porter made a proposal to expand Toronto Island airport to allow jets. City Council reserved its support, requiring the controversial proposal to be the focus of port authority studies. In November 2015, the federal government announced it would not support the proposal. In 2015 a new pedestrian tunnel was opened connecting Toronto–Billy Bishop to the mainland. Despite an increase in passenger traffic at Bishop, Porter Airlines still reported a loss in operations during this period. In 2017, it lost CA$18.9 million, in 2018 CA$40 million and CA$30 million in 2019. In 2018, Porter reduced the number of slots it rented at Bishop from Nieuport by 18.5%, effective in 2020, reducing its costs by CA$12.2 million. Porter estimated that operating at Billy Bishop was three times the cost of operating at Toronto–Pearson.

On March 18, 2020, Porter announced that they would suspend all flights, initially from March 20 through to June 1 due to the ongoing COVID-19 pandemic. The suspension of service was then extended several times until it was announced that Porter would be returning to service starting September 8, 2021, nearly 18 months since all flights were suspended. Porter Airlines reached an agreement with the Government of Canada for loans valued up to CA$270.5 million, which were used as a capital reserve during the COVID-19 pandemic recovery period.

In July 2021, Porter announced that it would begin flying out of Toronto–Pearson and expand its destinations throughout Canada, the United States, and Caribbean, starting in mid-2022. Porter ordered 30 Embraer E195-E2 jet airplanes in 2021, later increasing the number to 50. With the prohibition on jet traffic at Toronto Island Airport, Porter launched flights from Toronto–Pearson to new destinations in western Canada (Vancouver, Edmonton and Calgary) and augmented its service to existing destinations in eastern Canada (Ottawa, Montreal and Halifax) that are already served by the De Havilland Dash 8-400 from Toronto–Billy Bishop. In November 2023, Porter ordered another 25 jets, bringing to total to 75 firm orders, with 25 purchase options still remaining.

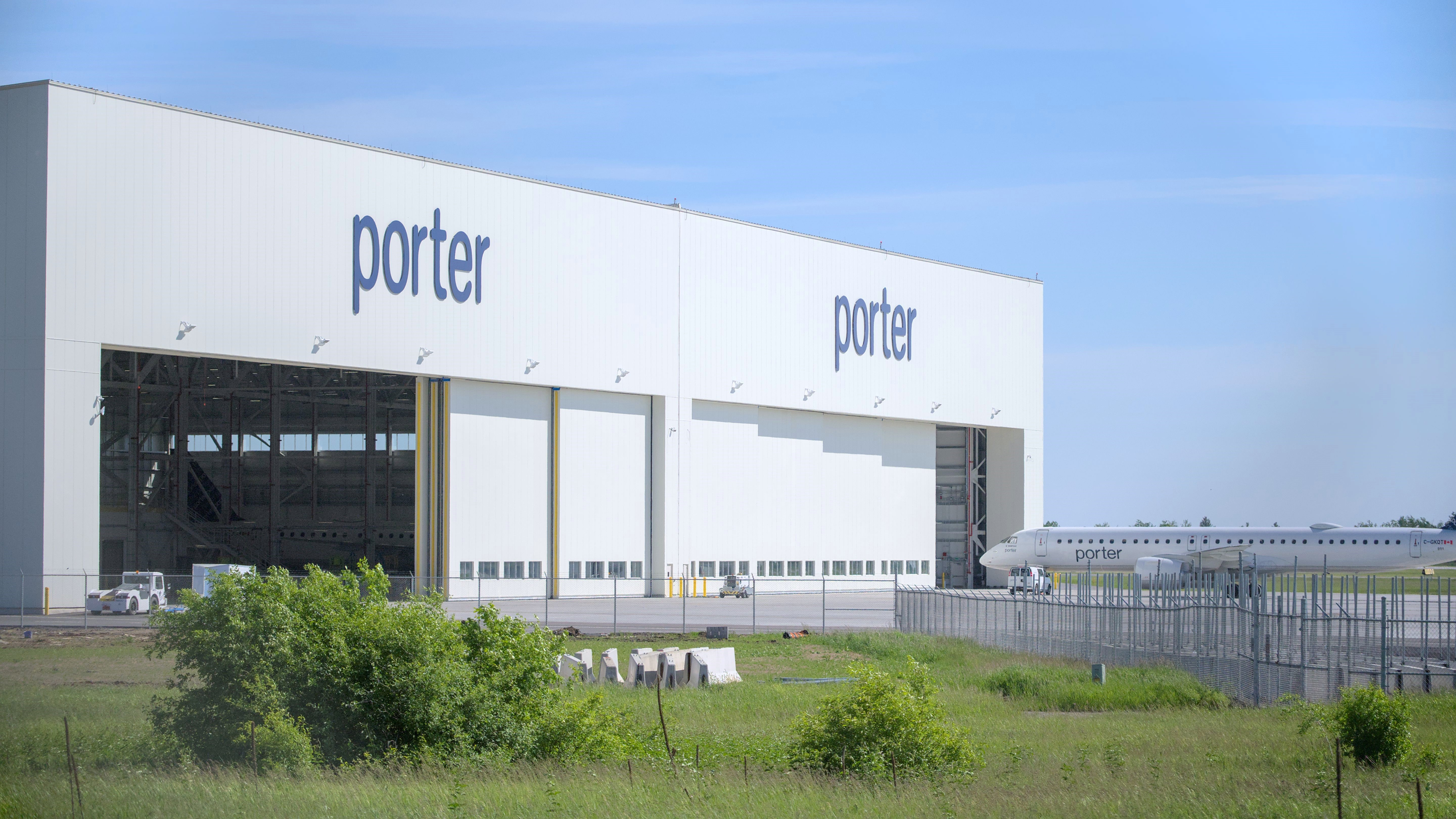
Porter's maintenance base at Ottawa Macdonald–Cartier

In addition, the airline expanded its operation at Ottawa's Macdonald–Cartier International Airport. Porter launched new routes from Ottawa to two destinations in the eastern United States (New York-Newark and Boston) and four destinations across Canada (Charlottetown, Thunder Bay, Edmonton and Vancouver). With Porter’s Embraer E195-E2 aircraft being deployed from Toronto–Pearson and its De Havilland Canada DHC-8-400 aircraft serving the small Toronto–Billy Bishop, the Ottawa hub is the only one where both aircraft types have a regular presence, making it an important hub for Porter's network. Porter's largest maintenance hangar is located at the Ottawa airport. Porter has built a new maintenance base at Ottawa International Airport. The 150,000 ft^{2} (14,000 m^{2}) facility houses Porter's maintenance operations for the Embraer E195-E2. Porter partnered with Algonquin College to offer work-integrated learning at the facility.

Porter constructed a new terminal at the MET – Montreal Metropolitan Airport, which opened June 15, 2026. This enables domestic-only service to a secondary airport for the Montreal region. Porter flies both the De Havilland Dash 8-400 and the Embraer E195-E2 from the airport.

== Organization ==
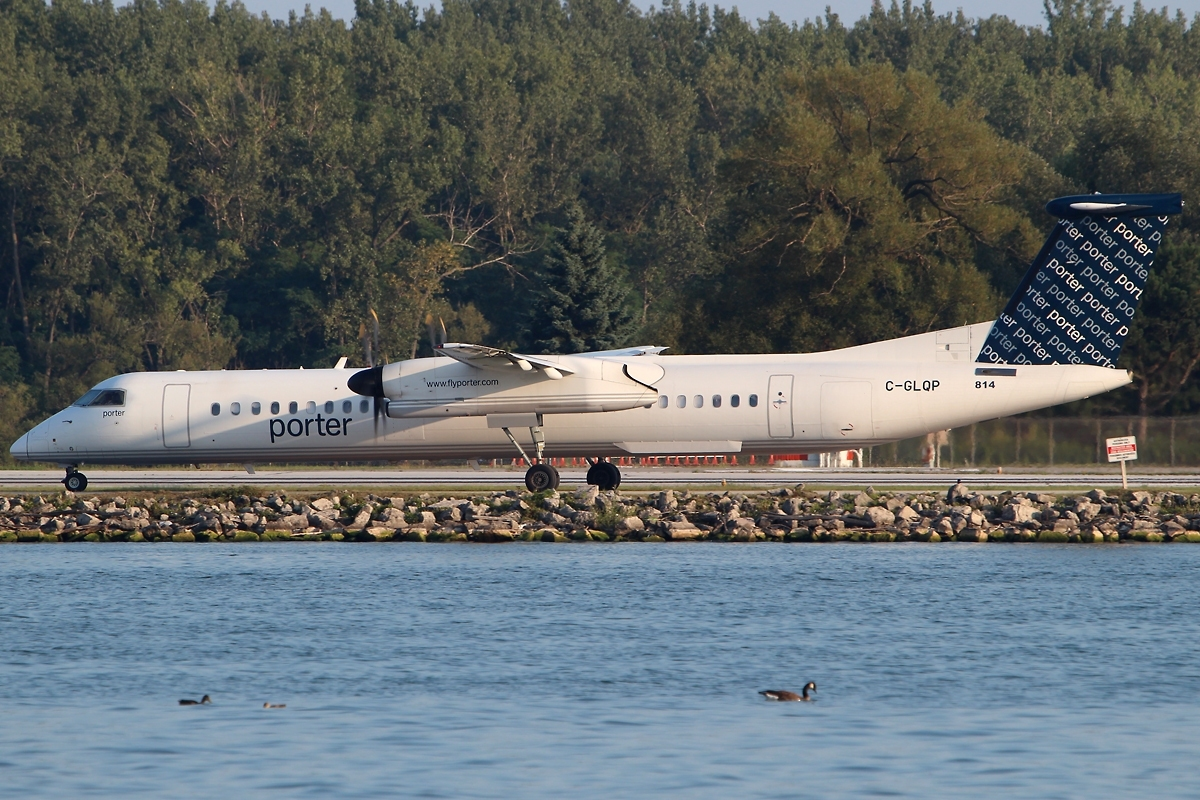
A De Havilland Canada Dash 8 Q400 at Billy Bishop Toronto City Airport

Porter Airlines is majority owned by Porter Aviation Holdings. In 2009, Porter's institutional investors include EdgeStone Capital Partners, Borealis Infrastructure, GE Asset Management Incorporated and Dancap Private Equity Inc. In 2013, Porter's investors are listed as EdgeStone Capital Partners, OMERS Strategic Investments, GE Asset Management Incorporated and Dancap Private Equity Inc.

The then REGCO Holdings purchased the Toronto Island Airport assets of City Centre Aviation Ltd in 2005. This included the terminal used by Air Canada's Jazz airline, which at the time operated daily flights to Ottawa from the airport. On February 15, 2006, Air Canada had announced that its contract to operate its Jazz airline service out of the terminal at the airport had been terminated. On February 27, 2006, REGCO was able to evict Jazz from the airport. Air Canada took the case to court but lost an Ontario Superior Court ruling. REGCO's fully owned subsidiary 'City Centre Aviation' (later Porter FBO) then commenced renovations of the terminal building to serve Porter Airlines, which started flights in October 2006.

A new subsidiary, City Centre Terminal Corp., was set up in 2009 to manage Porter's new terminal at the island airport. The new terminal's cost of construction was estimated at CA$50 million. The first half of the new terminal opened on March 7, 2010. The terminal was completed in early 2011. The new terminal has eleven gates, two lounges, check-in and security areas, and food outlets.

The airline's mascot is a stylised raccoon named "Mr. Porter". The raccoon appears in Porter newspaper ads. Porter also advertises on radio, using an announcer. The design of staff uniforms is based on 1960s standards of airline fashion. Porter has 933 employees as of March 31, 2010.

Porter was initially organized as a private company. On April 16, 2010, Porter Aviation Holdings announced they were going to be listed as a publicly traded company. The company filed a preliminary prospectus — a business plan — with securities commissions across the country, a requirement before it can offer shares. The company has $306 million of debt and leases and intended to raise $120 million of new shares in the company and order seven new Q400 planes. However, after twice delaying the final deadline for the offering, and lowering its share price from between $6 and $7 per share to $5.50, Porter cancelled the initial public offering. According to Robert Deluce, "We came to the conclusion that it was really prudent to defer the offering at this time and to wait until better market conditions existed. We wanted to raise some capital. We thought the IPO was the way to go, but we weren't prepared in any way to sell our stock at just any price".

The media had openly speculated on the profitability of Porter as being a money-losing operation, as would be typical of a start-up. CEO Deluce had been asked by the media to provide information on the financial status of Porter, but declined. In its prospectus, the company outlined a loss of CA$4.6 million on revenues of CA$151 million for 2009. To be profitable, the airline needs to be filling 49.3% of its seats with paying customers. In 2009, the airline filled 41% of its seats, and in the first quarter of 2010, it filled 47%. Overall, the airline carried 900,000 passengers in 2009, 800,000 through Toronto island airport. In 2011, the airline filled 55.9% of its seats. As part of disclosure for its public offering, Porter disclosed that from its startup in 2006 until May 2010, Porter lost CA$44.5 million. In an interview with Toronto Life magazine in May 2013, Robert Deluce stated that Porter turned a profit in 2011 and 2012, and paid out profit sharing.

Porter sold the terminal at Toronto–Billy Bishop in Toronto to Nieuport Aviation Infrastructure Partners GP in January 2015. According to Deluce, this meant that the airline was debt-free, although it would now pay to lease the facility. The sale was estimated to be in the range of CA$750 million. Being debt-free was considered a good position to be in if it were to buy Bombardier CS100 jets to use at the island airport. However, in November 2015, the Government of Canada announced it would not support the expansion of the island airport to support the jets.

== Controversies ==
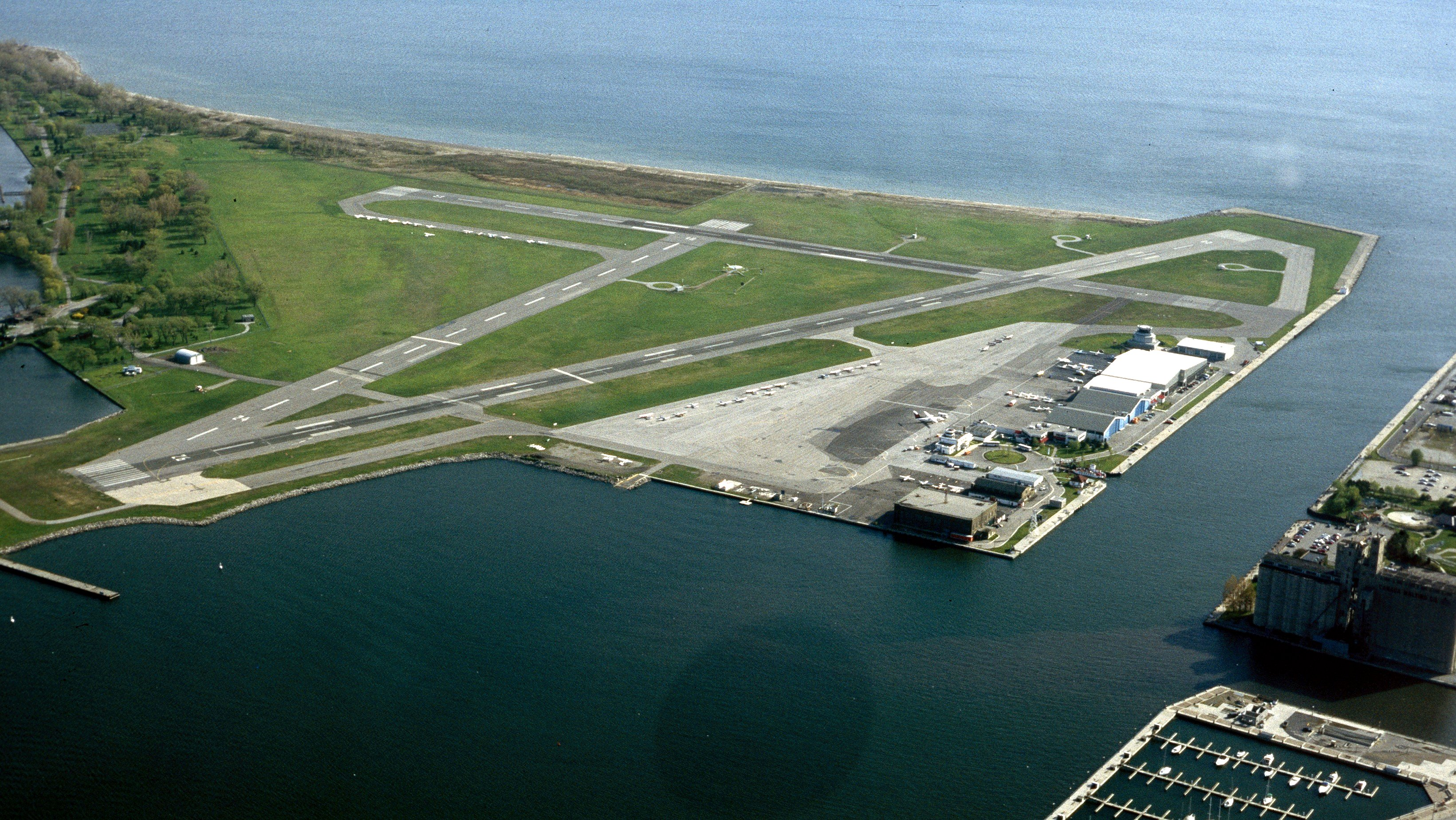
Toronto–Billy Bishop on the Toronto Islands, viewed from the CN Tower

Porter Airlines' launch was controversial, as it pitted Toronto residents seeking to close or stop the expansion of the airport against business interests and a government agency determined to make the airport self-sufficient. In 2002, the 'Toronto City Centre Airport', or 'Island Airport', operated by the Toronto Port Authority (TPA) (renamed in 2015 as "PortsToronto") was subsidized by CA$1 million per year. Only Air Canada flew flights from the airport as part of its Jazz service, operating daily flights to Ottawa after the closure of the regional airline City Express in 1991. In October 2002, the TPA announced a CA$35 million plan of improvements to the airport to expand its usage. The TPA planned to build a CA$15 million bridge and a CA$20 million airport terminal. A new regional airline would be launched at the airport, to be run by Robert Deluce, the former CEO of Air Ontario. Since its opening, the airport, located on Toronto Island, was accessible by passenger ferry only and the ferry-only access was seen as an obstacle to expansion. In a deal with the City of Toronto government, the TPA's plans were approved by Toronto City Council in November 2002.

The TPA's plans were opposed by neighbouring residents and community associations who together formed the Community Air special interest group to fight the expansion. The expansion became a primary issue in the 2003 Toronto municipal election. Mayoral candidates Barbara Hall and John Tory supported the bridge and David Miller opposed it. Miller and a slate of like-minded candidates for council ran on a common platform, the centrepiece of which was to stop the bridge. After Miller was elected mayor in November 2003, the new council voted to cancel the previous Council's decision, stopping the bridge project. Concerns raised include safety. The airport's main runway is 4,000 feet (1,200 m) long, 600 feet (180 m) shorter than Bombardier's specifications for a fully loaded Q400. Porter solved this problem by fitting the planes for 70 passengers, less than the maximum load of 78 passengers. There are several cautions to pilots flying into the airport, including boat masts, a nearby wind turbine, and no-fly areas. The flight path into the airport requires the airplanes to fly an approach offset from the runway centre-line to avoid nearby hazards such as tall chimneys and buildings.

After the bridge was cancelled, Deluce launched a CA$505 million lawsuit against the City of Toronto and later expanded it to the Government of Canada. After receiving an unspecified amount of compensation from the TPA to settle the suit, his company bought the airport building that Jazz was using at the airport and cancelled Jazz's lease on January 31, 2006. Two days later, on February 2, 2006, he announced that Porter Airlines, a regional airline operating locally built Bombardier turboprops would begin service in 2006, operating from the airport, initially on a Toronto-Ottawa route. In a show of political support, the Porter press conference was staged at the Bombardier plant in suburban Toronto, where the airplanes are built, with support from Canadian Auto Workers leader Buzz Hargrove, who said it would create new employment opportunities in the region.

Jazz filed a CA$11.5 million lawsuit against the TPA and later, Porter, in the Ontario Superior Court in February 2006, alleging that the TPA signed contracts forcing Jazz out of the airport, causing a monopoly at the airport, and were anti-competitive. Jazz later filed a suit in Federal Court. On October 20, 2009, Jazz formally dropped its suit in Ontario Court, but continued its lawsuit against Porter and the TPA in Federal Court. According to the announcement, Jazz dropped the matter in provincial court as the TPA is a federal agency, and the airport is a federal facility. Damages in the federal case were not specified. Porter filed a counter-claim to Jazz' lawsuit citing damages of CA$850 million, based on Jazz' agreement with Air Canada.

The airline's maiden flight took place on October 23, 2006, to Ottawa. When flights began, airline passengers were at first blocked by protesters at the ferry dock, urging a boycott of the service.

The TPA confirmed at its annual meeting of September 12, 2008, that Porter was fined for breaking noise curfews in its operations following complaints from local residents. The TPA commissioned a study to reduce noise from Porter's takeoffs and landings.

In January 2009, the TPA announced plans to purchase a new, larger passenger ferry to support Porter's expansion plans. The ferry was financed out of an improvement fee to be charged to passengers. The ferry had been proposed by Porter's Deluce to the TPA's Board of Directors over the period of March – June 2008. The decision to approve the CA$5 million ferry precipitated a conflict-of-interest investigation of TPA director Colin Watson, who is a self-described friend of Deluce, and who voted in a 5–4 decision to approve the ferry. Watson was cleared of the charge by the federal ethics commissioner Mary Dawson in June 2009.

At the September 2009 annual meeting of the TPA, it was disclosed that Porter has broken its 11 p.m. curfew for landing at the airport three times in 2009, each time incurring a CA$5,000 fine. On one occasion, a Porter plane landed at the airport after-hours even after being advised by controllers to land at Pearson. According to Deluce, "You know hundreds and hundreds and hundreds of flights come and go on a daily basis, so there are very, very few occasions where it happens. And there are also particular circumstances — and the circumstances are rare — to operate outside these normal times." According to the TPA, they are powerless to stop Porter other than imposing fines, and that planes landing at the airport when no controllers are present is not a safety risk. TPA director Mark McQueen requested that the NAV Canada personnel stay on-site until the last flight has landed, but NAV Canada refused to do so.

On February 9, 2012, Transport Canada advised Porter it had received an Access to Information request for what are called "Notices of Suspension issues to Porter." Such notices are departmental warnings with strict deadlines to deal with problems that could be safety related, but could also be demands to replace key personnel, like pilots, who have left the company. Transport Canada told Porter it was considering releasing some information and wanted a written response from the company detailing why any records should be withheld. Based on Porter's response, the department decided to release a censored version of the material in question. Porter went to court to prevent that from happening. On July 11, 2013, the federal court ruled in Porter's favour and the Confidentiality Order dated September 14, 2012 would remain in effect. A technical issue with Transport Canada's handling of the matter was cited as the reason for the ruling.

On January 10, 2013, 22 Porter ground crew members went on strike in Toronto. This was the airline's first labour dispute since it began business. In April 2013, Porter filed a libel lawsuit against the Canadian Office and Professional Employees union representing the 22 striking workers. Porter suit was for CA$4 million in damages for alleged defamatory statements made by the union using its Twitter account. The strike was settled in June 2013, and Porter's lawsuit was dropped.

In June 2017, it was announced on Twitter that Porter Airlines had "blacklisted" the conservative Canadian media website "The Rebel Media", and had directly tweeted to Ezra Levant notifying him in person that they had removed their advertisements from Rebel Media's advertising space. Levant reacted by calling for a boycott of the airline. Porter Airlines subsequently apologized for the use of the word "blacklist".

=== 2013 Toronto–Billy Bishop airport expansion and jets proposal ===
In April 2013, Porter announced expansion plans to serve new destinations in Western Canada, California and Florida. To support the expansion, Porter reached a provisional agreement to purchase 12 107-seat Bombardier CS100 jets, with a future option to purchase up to 18 more. Porter's plans required regulatory and facility changes to its Billy Bishop Toronto City Airport hub. Porter asked for modifications to the operating agreement of the airport to allow jets and extensions to the runway to support the new aircraft, which Deluce claimed are quieter than its Q400s. The TPA stated that it had no position on the expansion and would await a decision from Toronto City Council.

Then-Toronto Mayor Rob Ford had indicated his support for the proposal while some councillors expressed their opposition with others urging further study. Porter CEO Robert Deluce was already a supporter of Mayor Ford, having contributed the maximum CA$2,500 to Ford's mayoral campaign while other Deluce family members donated an additional $5,000 to Ford's campaign. Deluce privately sought Ford's support on the proposal before its public announcement but the meetings between Ford and Deluce raised controversy as Deluce had not registered with the city as a lobbyist.

When announcing the proposal, Porter Airlines claimed in advertisements that 2/3 of Torontonians polled supported the expansion. However, the result was disputed by pollster Warren Kinsella who considered the survey's trustworthiness tainted as it was done by Nick Kouvalis, Ford's 2010 campaign manager, and the questions were 'directing' the result. The No Jets TO group filed a complaint with the Advertising Standards Council of Canada, calling the ads "patently false".

Toronto City Council held public consultations on the proposal during the fall of 2013, leading to a city staff report addressing the proposal. At the same time, Porter mounted a public relations campaign, based around the porterplans.com web site. Porter customers were telephoned and e-mailed and radio and newspaper advertisements were bought by Porter asking for the public to register their support with Toronto Council. After the consultation, and study of consultant reports, City staff recommended in a report to delay acting on the proposal until 2015. Concerns about the required infrastructure, public health concerns and the lack of an airport master plan were cited by staff. The TPA was also seeking an extension of the airport management agreement as a condition of the proposal. City Council's executive committee on December 5 voted to delay consideration of the proposal until 2014.

Another public hearing at Council was announced for January 27, 2014. At that time, Toronto City Council announced it could not support the proposal without further studies from the TPA, leading the body to initiate a series of investigation and viability analyses. In November 2015, federal Minister of Transport Marc Garneau announced he would not support the proposal and in December 2015, the TPA (rebranded as PortsToronto 11 months before) announced that it had "halted work on an environmental assessment and two studies" it had commissioned concerning the expansion.

== Destinations and hubs ==
=== Hubs ===
Porter Airlines currently operates three hubs:

- Toronto–Billy Bishop: Porter's hub for regional flights for downtown Toronto with destinations across Ontario, Quebec, Atlantic Canada and several cities in the United States. Porter's fleet of De Havilland Canada Dash 8-400 aircraft are based at this airport.
- Ottawa Macdonald-Cartier: Porter's primary hub connecting Ottawa with destinations across North America. Primary maintenance facility for Porter's Embraer E195-E2 fleet.
- Toronto–Pearson: Porter's secondary hub connecting Toronto with destinations across North America. Porter's fleet of Embraer E195-E2 aircraft is based at this airport.

=== Destinations ===
Porter Airlines flies (or has flown) to the following destinations:

Porter destinations
| Country | Province / State | City | Airport | Notes | Refs |
|---|---|---|---|---|---|
| Aruba | | Oranjestad | Queen Beatrix International Airport | Seasonal | |
| Bahamas | | Nassau | Lynden Pindling International Airport | | |
| Canada | Alberta | Calgary | Calgary International Airport | | |
| Canada | Alberta | Edmonton | Edmonton International Airport | | |
| Canada | British Columbia | Kelowna | Kelowna International Airport | | |
| Canada | British Columbia | Vancouver | Vancouver International Airport | | |
| Canada | British Columbia | Victoria | Victoria International Airport | | |
| Canada | Manitoba | Winnipeg | Winnipeg James Armstrong Richardson International Airport | | |
| Canada | New Brunswick | Fredericton | Fredericton International Airport | | |
| Canada | New Brunswick | Moncton | Greater Moncton Roméo LeBlanc International Airport | | |
| Canada | Newfoundland and Labrador | Deer Lake | Deer Lake Regional Airport | Seasonal | |
| Canada | Newfoundland and Labrador | Stephenville | Stephenville International Airport | Terminated | |
| Canada | Newfoundland and Labrador | St. John's | St. John's International Airport | | |
| Canada | Nova Scotia | Halifax | Halifax Stanfield International Airport | Focus city | |
| Canada | Ontario | Hamilton | John C. Munro Hamilton International Airport | Focus city | |
| Canada | Ontario | London | London International Airport | | |
| Canada | Ontario | Muskoka | Muskoka Airport | Terminated | |
| Canada | Ontario | North Bay | North Bay/Jack Garland Airport | Terminated | |
| Canada | Ontario | Ottawa | Ottawa Macdonald–Cartier International Airport | Hub | |
| Canada | Ontario | Sault Ste. Marie | Sault Ste. Marie Airport | | |
| Canada | Ontario | Sudbury | Sudbury Airport | | |
| Canada | Ontario | Timmins | Timmins Victor M. Power Airport | | |
| Canada | Ontario | Thunder Bay | Thunder Bay International Airport | | |
| Canada | Ontario | Toronto | Billy Bishop Toronto City Airport | Hub | |
| Canada | Ontario | Toronto | Toronto Pearson International Airport | Hub | |
| Canada | Ontario | Windsor | Windsor International Airport | | |
| Canada | Prince Edward Island | Charlottetown | Charlottetown Airport | | |
| Canada | Quebec | Montreal | Montréal–Trudeau International Airport | Focus city | |
| Canada | Quebec | Montreal | Montreal Metropolitan Airport | Focus city | |
| Canada | Quebec | Mont-Tremblant | Mont-Tremblant International Airport | Terminated | |
| Canada | Quebec | Quebec City | Québec City Jean Lesage International Airport | | |
| Canada | Saskatchewan | Saskatoon | Saskatoon John G. Diefenbaker International Airport | | |
| Cayman Islands | | George Town | Owen Roberts International Airport | Seasonal | |
| Costa Rica | Guanacaste | Liberia | Guanacaste Airport | Seasonal | |
| Costa Rica | Alajuela | San José | Juan Santamaría International Airport | Begins December 2, 2026 | |
| Jamaica | | Montego Bay | Sangster International Airport | Begins November 23, 2026 | |
| Mexico | Jalisco | Puerto Vallarta | Licenciado Gustavo Díaz Ordaz International Airport | | |
| Mexico | Quintana Roo | Cancún | Cancún International Airport | | |
| Mexico | Baja California Sur | San José del Cabo | Los Cabos International Airport | Seasonal | |
| Turks and Caicos Islands | | Providenciales | Providenciales International Airport | Seasonal | |
| United States | Arizona | Phoenix | Phoenix Sky Harbor International Airport | | |
| United States | California | Los Angeles | Los Angeles International Airport | | |
| United States | California | Palm Springs | Palm Springs International Airport | Seasonal | |
| United States | California | San Francisco | San Francisco International Airport | | |
| United States | California | San Diego | San Diego International Airport | Terminated | |
| United States | District of Columbia/Virginia | Washington, D.C. | Dulles International Airport | | |
| United States | Florida | Fort Lauderdale | Fort Lauderdale–Hollywood International Airport | | |
| United States | Florida | Fort Myers | Southwest Florida International Airport | Seasonal | |
| United States | Florida | Melbourne | Melbourne Orlando International Airport | Terminated | |
| United States | Florida | Miami | Miami International Airport | Seasonal | |
| United States | Florida | Orlando | Orlando International Airport | | |
| United States | Florida | Tampa | Tampa International Airport | Seasonal | |
| United States | Florida | West Palm Beach | Palm Beach International Airport | Seasonal | |
| United States | Illinois | Chicago | Midway International Airport | Terminated | |
| United States | Illinois | Chicago | O'Hare International Airport | | |
| United States | Massachusetts | Boston | Logan International Airport | | |
| United States | Nevada | Las Vegas | Harry Reid International Airport | | |
| United States | South Carolina | Charleston | Charleston International Airport | Terminated | |
| United States | South Carolina | Myrtle Beach | Myrtle Beach International Airport | Terminated | |
| United States | New Jersey | Newark | Newark Liberty International Airport | | |
| United States | New York | New York City | LaGuardia Airport | | |
| United States | Pennsylvania | Pittsburgh | Pittsburgh International Airport | Terminated | |
| United States | Texas | Austin | Austin–Bergstrom International Airport | | |
| United States | Vermont | Burlington | Patrick Leahy Burlington International Airport | Terminated | |

In 2016, Porter ran a small number of flights from Toronto and Ottawa to Winnipeg to test this potential market.

=== Joint Venture ===
Porter airlines has joint venture agreements with following airlines:

- Air Transat

=== Codeshare agreements ===
Porter codeshares with the following airlines:

- Air Transat
- American Airlines
- British Airways
- Qatar Airways

=== Interline agreements ===
Porter interlines with the following airlines:

- Aeroméxico
- Alaska Airlines
- APG Airlines
- Azores Airlines
- Delta Air Lines
- El Al
- Fiji Airways
- Icelandair
- Japan Airlines
- JetBlue
- Pascan Aviation
- Singapore Airlines

== Fleet ==
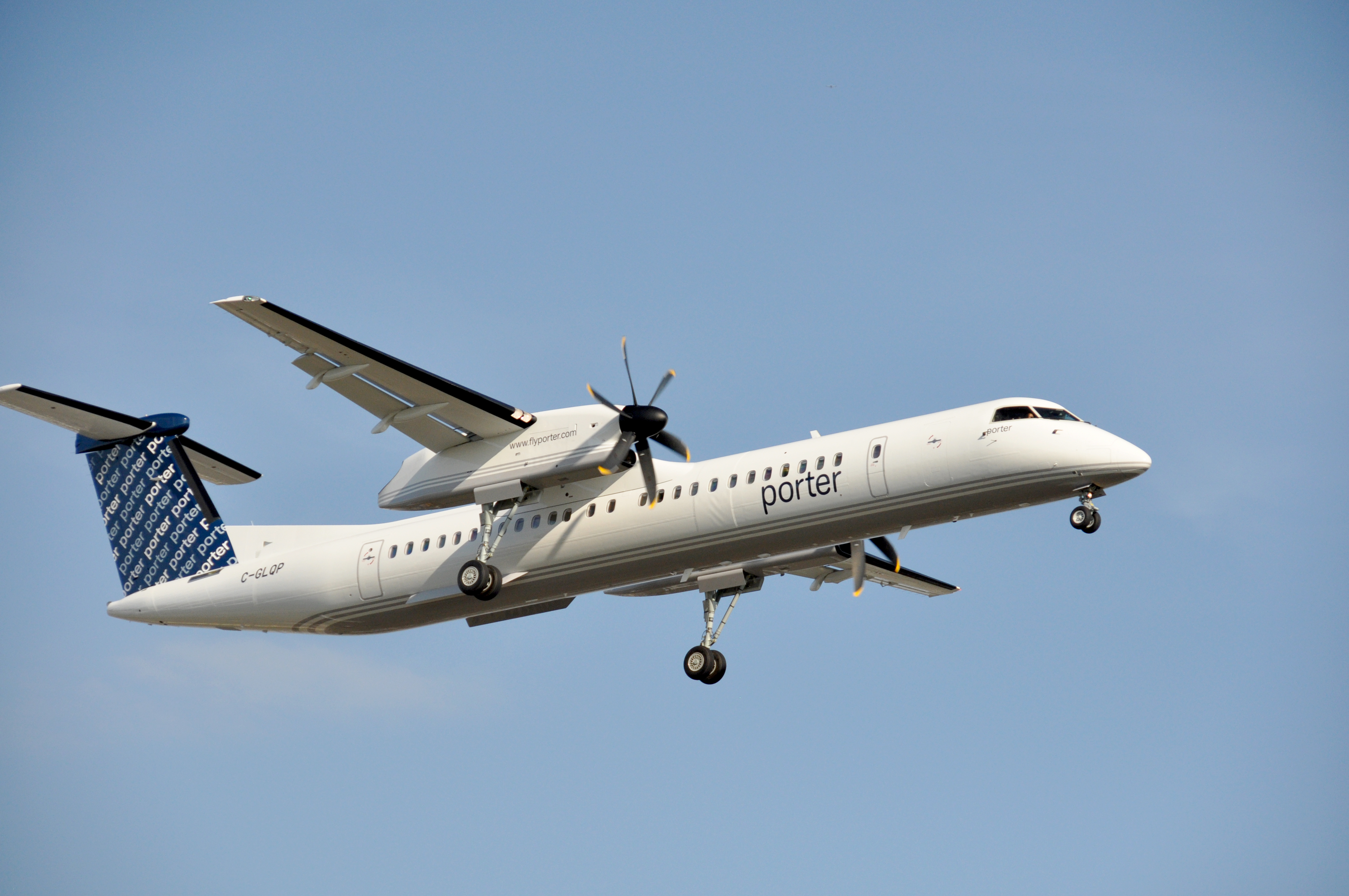
Porter Dash 8-400

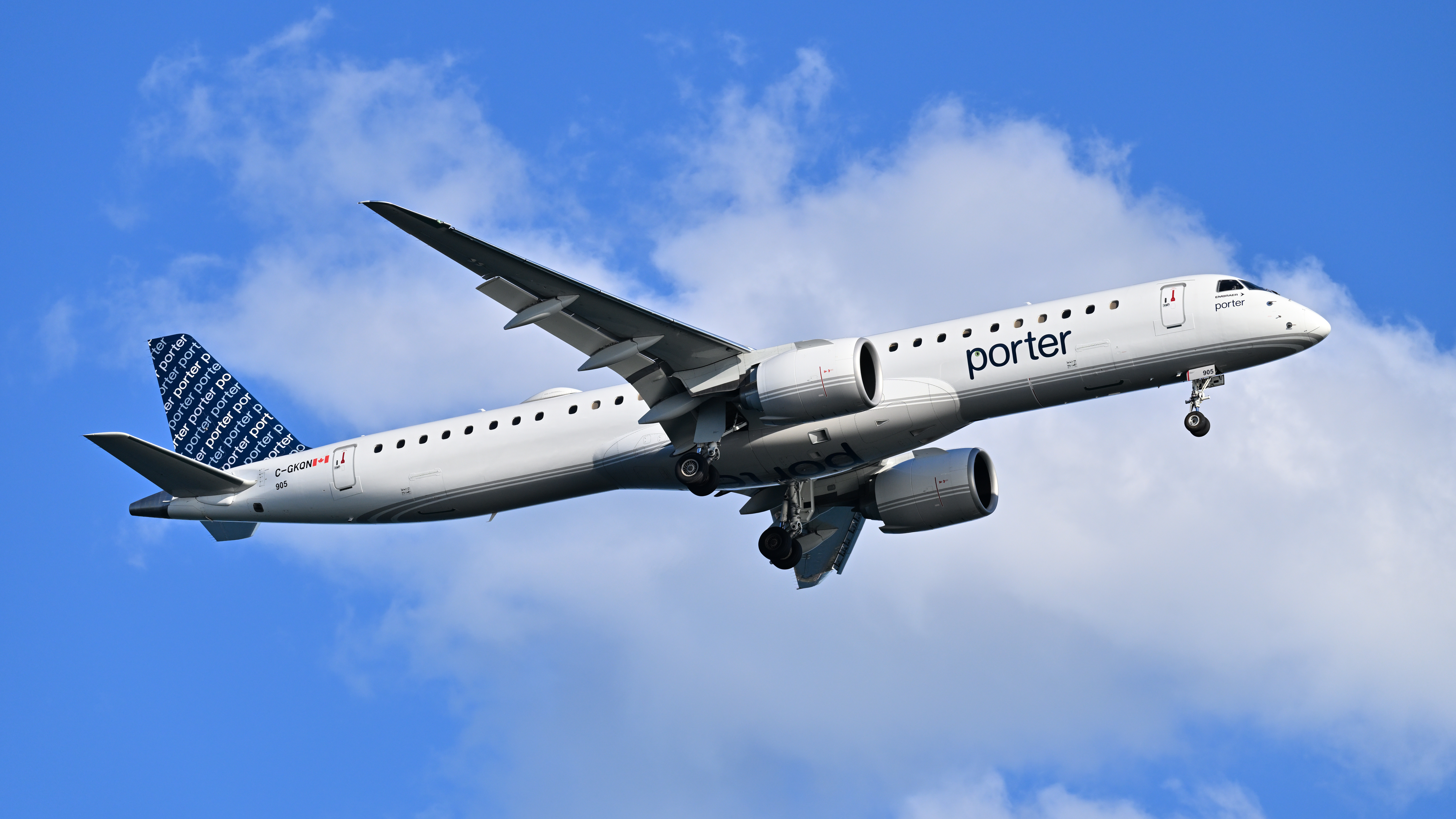
Porter Embraer E195-E2

Porter Airlines operates the following aircraft:

Porter Airlines fleet
| Aircraft | In service | Orders | Passengers | | | | Refs | Notes |
| Aircraft | In service | Orders | W | Y+ | Y | Total | Refs | Notes |
|---|---|---|---|---|---|---|---|---|
| De Havilland Canada Dash 8-400 | 29 | — | 6 | — | 72 | 78 | | To be retrofitted with new cabin by 2026. |
| Embraer E195-E2 | 53 | 22 | 16 | 20 | 96 | 132 | | Purchase rights for an additional 25 aircraft. |
| Total | 82 | 22 | | | | | | |

Originally, Porter ordered ten 70-seat Bombardier Q400 turboprops, with ten more as options, at a value estimated by Porter of over CA$500 million. In June 2009, Porter exercised the option to purchase the 19th and 20th Q400s. Porter chose the 70-seat configuration (less than the maximum of 78 seats) due to the short length of the runway at Toronto Island Airport; a fully loaded 78-seat configuration would need a longer runway than available at the airport. This means Porter aircraft have a slightly greater seat pitch than a 78-seat aircraft. The 70-seat configuration also allows Porter to use the shorter runway 11/29 at Newark. In May 2010, Porter announced that it intended to order seven more Dash 8 Q400 aircraft. On August 6, 2010, it was announced that Porter had ordered four more Q400s with options for six more. In November 2011, Porter Airlines accepted two new Bombardier Q400 NextGen aircraft, bringing the company's fleet to 26. In late 2013, Porter added an additional four seats to all of their Q400s, giving them a total of 74 seats per aircraft. In 2021, the airline updated its interiors with TiSeat E2 seats, adding an extra row, and giving all their aircraft 78 seats each.

In April 2013, Porter Airlines announced a conditional (if Toronto–Billy Bishop were to be expanded) purchase agreement for up to thirty Bombardier CS100 (Airbus A220-100) aircraft, including purchase rights for six more Q400 NextGen aircraft. Porter had signed a letter of intent with Bombardier in December 2012. The total value of the deal was estimated at US$2.29 billion for all 30 CS100s and six Q400s. In July 2016, Porter announced the purchase of a further three Q400 planes. Despite the airport expansion cancellation, Deluce stated that it still had its deposit in place for the 2013 order of jets and six Q400s, as "something we are looking at carefully".

On July 12, 2021, Porter announced that it would purchase 30 Embraer E195-E2 jet aircraft, with purchase rights for an additional 50 aircraft. As Toronto–Billy Bishop does not allow jets under its terms of operation, the airline announced that it would base the planes out of its hubs at Toronto-Pearson and Ottawa airports, as well as its focus cities in Montreal and Halifax, serving a growing list of destinations across Canada and the United States, with plans to eventually expand to Mexico and the Caribbean. When deliveries began in the second half of 2022, Porter became the North American launch customer for the Embraer E2 series.

In July 2022, Porter announced a firm order for 20 Embraer E195-E2 passenger jets with a total list price value of US$1.56 billion, bringing its orders with Embraer to a total of 50 firm commitments and 50 purchase rights. It began taking delivery of these jets on December 21, 2022.

== Services ==
=== Cabins ===
PorterReserve is offered on both its Dash 8-400 and E195-E2 fleet with the first two rows of seating with a pitch of 32" on the Dash 8-400 and the first four rows of seating with a of pitch of 36" on the E195-E2 and are both offered in a 2-2 configuration. All PorterReserve flights include beer, wine and upsized premium snacks. Porter also offers a free meal service for PorterReserve passengers on flights over 2.5 hours.

PorterClassic Stretch is only offered on its E195-E2 fleet across five rows in a 2-2 configuration. The seats are offered in rows 5-7 with a pitch of 34", and in the emergency exit rows 13-14 with a pitch of 36".

=== In-flight amenities ===
Porter provides complimentary snacks and beverages, including free beer and wine on board its aircraft. The airline serves all alcoholic beverages in glassware. Fresh food is also offered on flights over 150 minutes with the E195-E2 aircraft. While the airline's planes do not have seatback entertainment screens, Porter offers free Wi-Fi onboard their E195-E2 aircraft.

=== Complimentary services ===
The airline offers a frequent flyer rewards program called 'VIPorter', whereby points can be redeemed for free flights. A free shuttle bus runs between Toronto's Union Station and Billy Bishop Toronto City Airport, which departs every 15 minutes.
