= Robert Poirier (businessman) =

Canadian businessman

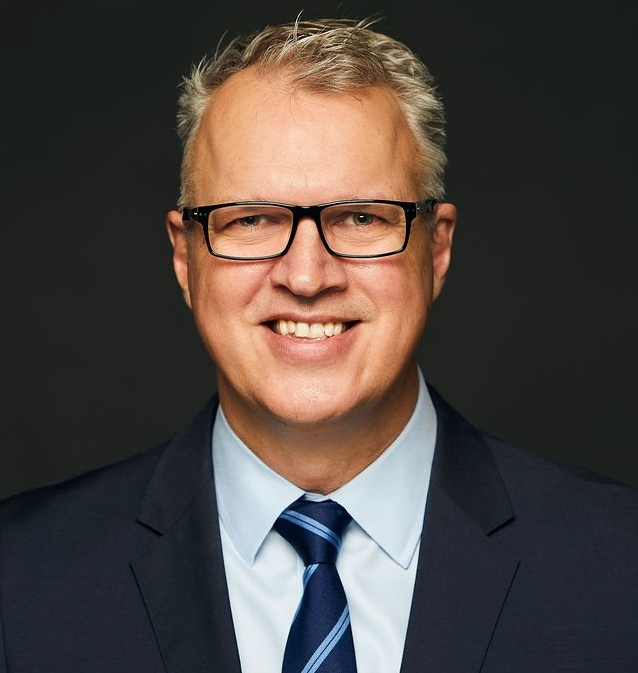
- Poirier in 2021
- Born: Niagara, Canada
- Occupations: Businessman, Banker
- Awards: Order of Ontario (2022)

Robert Poirier, O.Ont, is a Canadian businessman and a 2022 recipient of the Order of Ontario for his work on infrastructure, environmental sustainability and community benefits.

== Career ==
Robert Poirier served as managing director of pensions, trusts and alternative investment servicing at State Street from 2006 to 2016 before joining in 2017 the board of Northern Trust Company, Canada responsible for investment servicing and management of public and corporate pensions and trusts. Previously, he held senior financial services strategy roles at Bell Canada and Bank of Montreal, and served as a senior advisor to members of the Standing Senate Committee on Banking, Trade and Commerce.

Before his work in the private sector, and following a 1992 Senate of Canada rule change by members of the Internal Economy, Budgets and Administration, Poirier worked on Parliament Hill as the first policy advisor to be hired directly by members of the Senate.

Following the 1993 federal election, Poirier served as a policy advisor to members of the newly established Special Joint Defence Committee of the Senate and House of Commons, under the leadership of Rear-Admiral Fred J. Mifflin, to review Canada's defence policy, culminating in a report entitled Security in a Changing World, tabled in both chambers on October 21, 1994.

In 1995, Poirier then served as senior advisor to members of the Standing Senate Committee on Banking, Trade and Commerce under the chairmanship of Senator Michael Kirby, where he served until 1999, and was responsible for many bills, motions and reports including Senate Motion No. 45 where he guided the same motion in the House of Commons leading to the eventual abolition, by the then federal finance minister, Paul Martin, of the foreign content rule on deferred registered income plans and advised on Bill C-78, An Act to establish the Public Sector Pension Investment Board and governance provisions to establish the Canada Pension Plan Investment Board (CPP Investment Board).

Since 2019, Poirier has operated his strategy and governance advisory firm, NeuState Advisory, while focusing on his board work.

On November 22, 2024, the Minister of Municipal Affairs appointed Poirier to undertake a governance review of the Ontario Municipal Employees’ Retirement System (OMERS) to ensure that its governance model is serving the interests of plan members in a fair, equitable, and transparent manner that supports the plan's long-term financial sustainability. On November 5, 2025, his report was published, and on November 27, 2025, Bill 68 received Royal Assent and implemented some of the recommendations. The Minister also announced that Robert's term would be extended to March 31, 2027, to advise on transitional matters.

== Board work ==
In 2009, as a result of changes to the Canada Marine Act, by the government of Stephen Harper, increasing the size of the board of directors, Poirier was appointed on the advice of the Finance Minister, Jim Flaherty, to the Toronto Port Authority which owns and operates Billy Bishop Toronto City Airport. In 2015, he was elected chair of the board of directors composed of individuals appointed by all levels of government – city, provincial, and federal.

In 2017, as chair of the Toronto Port Authority, including Billy Bishop Toronto City Airport, Poirier oversaw the sale of the historic Toronto Harbour Commission Building to the Oxford Properties Group and the Canada Pension Plan Investment Board for $96 million.

After almost 12 years, Poirier left in 2021 due to legislative term limits, making him the longest-serving board member. At the time, Poirier was thought to be the last Harper-era appointed federal agency chair under the Trudeau government. Before leaving, Poirier oversaw a process to identify a financial investor interested in operating Billy Bishop Toronto City Airport under a lease "to reduce PortsToronto’s overall debt position, restore and enhance liquidity; enable ongoing and future infrastructure investment; and ensure the Airport’s long-term viability." Poirier is said to have helped transform Billy Bishop Toronto City Airport into one of the most successful, community-oriented, and environmentally sustainable urban airports in North America.

In 2017, Poirier received his ICD.D designation from the Institute of Corporate Directors, joined the board of directors for the Northern Trust Company, Canada and currently serves as chair and was also elected to the board of directors of the Resource Productivity & Recovery Authority where in 2020 he was elected chair. In 2019, he was appointed, by the Minister of Transport, to the board of Metrolinx, where he served as chair of the Real Estate Committee, and in 2024, as chair of the Capital Oversight Committee, composed of both board directors and industry experts, overseeing an annual capital budget of approx. $6.8 billion and more than $75 billion worth of new transit projects. In 2022, Poirier was appointed by the Ontario Minister of Finance to The Ontario Lottery and Gaming Corporation and serves as the chair of the Transformation and Technology Committee and previously as chair of the Governance and Corporate Social Responsibility Committee.

== Published articles ==
In 2020, Poirier published an article in the Financial Post, Supercharge the economic recovery with small- and medium-sized businesses, and in 2021, in Renew Canada, Electric Ferry a First for Island Airport on the conversion of the Billy Bishop Toronto City Airport passenger and vehicle ferry to electric power using Canadian technology.

== Designations ==
- Inducted into the Order of Ontario in 2022.
- Received the Professional Land Economist (PLE) designation in 2022.
- Received his ICD.D designation from the Institute of Corporate Directors in 2017.

== Personal life ==
Poirier resides in Oakville, Ontario with his wife and family.

He holds a Bachelor of Commerce (Business Management), with honours, from Ryerson University, where he was elected to its governing bodies, the Senate, the Academic Council, and the Student Council, serving as Vice President representing the Business School, now known as the Ted Rogers School of Management.
