= Toronto Port Authority =

Port authority in Toronto, Canada

- Predecessor: Toronto Harbour Commission
- Established: June 8, 1999
- Type: Government-owned enterprise
- Purpose: Port authority
- Headquarters: 207 Queens Quay West, Suite 500, Toronto, Ontario, Canada
- Leader: Roelof-Jan (RJ) Steenstra, CEO
- Staff: 139 (120 full-time, 19 part-time)
- Website: www.torontoportauthority.com

The Toronto Port Authority (TPA) is a port authority that is responsible for the management of the Port of Toronto, including the International Marine Passenger Terminal, and Billy Bishop Toronto City Airport. It was established under the Canada Marine Act as a government business enterprise that is self-funded, with directors appointed by three levels of government – the Government of Canada (through the Minister of Transport), the Government of Ontario and the City of Toronto. The TPA rebranded itself as PortsToronto in 2015, and on January 15, 2026, returned to its legal/legacy name of Toronto Port Authority.

The organization is the successor to the Toronto Harbour Commission (THC) that had managed Toronto Harbour since 1911, paid for through government transfers, harbour and airport fees. As part of a Canada-wide plan of the Government of Canada to turn government commissions into self-sufficient agencies, the TPA was set up in 1999 to take over the port and airport functions of the THC. This was done against the wishes of the City of Toronto, which had been transferring THC harbour lands to city agencies for redevelopment. The city had planned to take over the harbour administration as a direct city function.

The new mission, to be self-sufficient, led the TPA to pursue opportunities to increase its revenues, including expansion of the island airport and the building of a cruise ship terminal. The TPA built a working relationship with startup airline Porter Airlines and, despite the 2003 cancellation of a permanent bridge to the airport, has been successful in increasing air traffic at the airport to the point where it turned a profit in 2008. It has since built a pedestrian tunnel to the airport.

The TPA's efforts to expand the airport in partnership with Porter has placed it in opposition to various communities in Toronto and Toronto City Council, which in 2003 cancelled a TPA-planned bridge to the airport. Additionally, the TPA has been involved in several disputes, including a land dispute, harbour fees and property taxes with the city, and lawsuits over the operation of the airport with Air Canada. In 2013, Porter proposed an expansion of the airport to support the introduction of jet airplanes to the airport. Toronto City Council refused to endorse the proposal and sent it to the TPA for study. The jet proposal was cancelled in December 2015 after the newly elected Liberal federal government announced it would not renegotiate the operating agreement of the airport to allow jets. A second attempt in 2026 was met with such backlash that the Government of Canada declined to support it, though the Government of Ontario vowed to carry through with it.

== Operations ==
Toronto Port Authority operates the Billy Bishop Toronto City Airport, Billy Bishop Toronto City Water Aerodrome, Port of Toronto, the International Marine Passenger Terminal and the Outer Harbour Marina. TPA also provides regulatory controls and public works for marine and air navigation in the port and harbour of Toronto. TPA grants operator's permits to recreational boaters in the harbour of Toronto, oversees land development, engages in trade development for its terminals, and appoints the Harbour Master. TPA has a staff of 110 full-time employees and approximately 25 seasonal and part-time workers. As of December 2008, the organization had CA$46 million in capital assets.

=== Billy Bishop Toronto City Airport ===
Billy Bishop Toronto City Airport, or Toronto Island Airport, is located at the western end of Toronto Islands. Operation of the airport is governed by a 1983 tripartite agreement between the Toronto Harbour Commission, the Government of Canada and the City of Toronto. The majority of the airport land (78%) is owned by the Toronto Port Authority with two small sections owned by the Government of Canada and a small section owned by the city. The small portion of city-owned land is leased to the Toronto Port Authority for a nominal amount until 2033 under the 1983 agreement. Access to the airport is by ferry services operated by the Toronto Port Authority and a pedestrian tunnel.

Built in 1939 on land dredged from the harbour, it has two runways which can accommodate the smaller planes of regional scheduled airlines and general aviation aircraft. The 1983 agreement prohibits jet airplanes except in emergencies. In 2007, the number of landings and take-offs at the airport was 90,199. Because of its location near downtown and its tall buildings, industrial smokestacks and a wind turbine, air traffic into and out of the airport is controlled with approaches and departures routed over the lake. A seaplane base is located just east of the main apron. The airport is also used for medical flights.

The airport has been the site of operations of several regional airlines since the 1980s. The first airline was City Express, until 1990. This was followed by Air Ontario and Air Canada Jazz. Since 2006, Porter Airlines has operated out of the airport. The airline currently flies to more than 20 regional destinations including Ottawa, Montreal and Newark, Chicago, Boston, Halifax and Quebec City. The airport handled 2.8 million passengers in 2018.

=== Port of Toronto ===
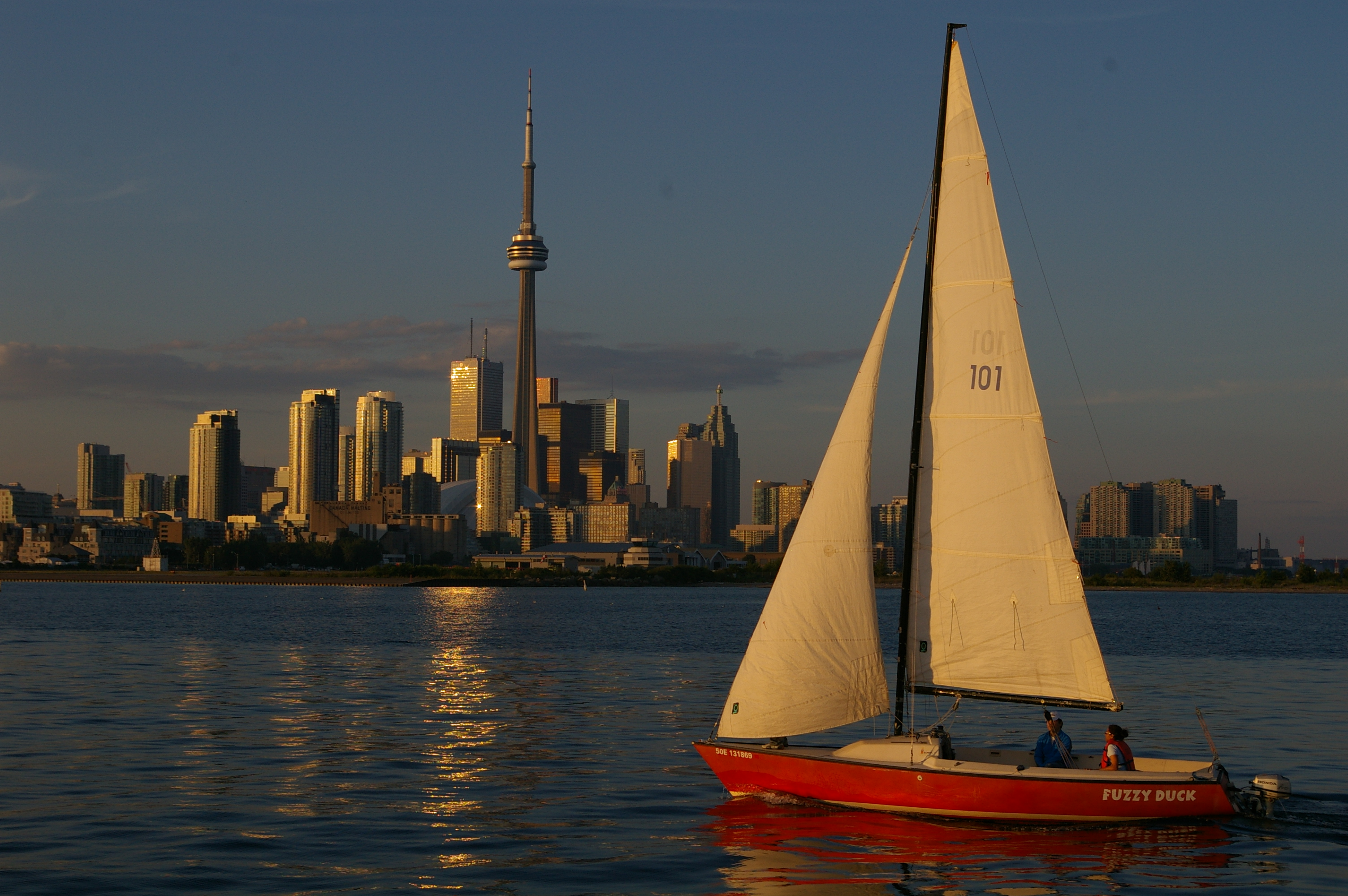
Toronto Harbour

The Port of Toronto is located at the eastern end of the Toronto Harbour. The Toronto Port Authority operates a 21-hectare (52-acre) paved facility consisting of Marine Terminal 51 and Warehouse 52 on the east side of the harbour. There are 3 miles (4.8 km) of deep-water wharfage for the loading and unloading of bulk products. Marine terminals include inside and outside storage, and some 6,000 square feet (560 m^{2}) of berthing space for ships carrying general cargo. The port facilities include the Cruise Ship Facility, or International Marine Passenger Terminal which was built as a passenger terminal for a ferry to Rochester, New York.

The lands of the Port of Toronto used to be significantly larger. The Port Lands surrounding the facility were created by infilling the delta of the Don River by the Toronto Harbour Commission in the 1910s, and were owned and controlled by the Harbour Commission until the 1990s, when they were transferred to the City of Toronto. The lands are expected to be redeveloped into a new neighbourhood, by the Waterfront Toronto partnership. The north-east corner of the harbour, formerly housing marine terminals, is being redeveloped into the East Bayfront residential neighbourhood. The Don River mouth is planned to be 're-naturalized'.

=== Other facilities ===
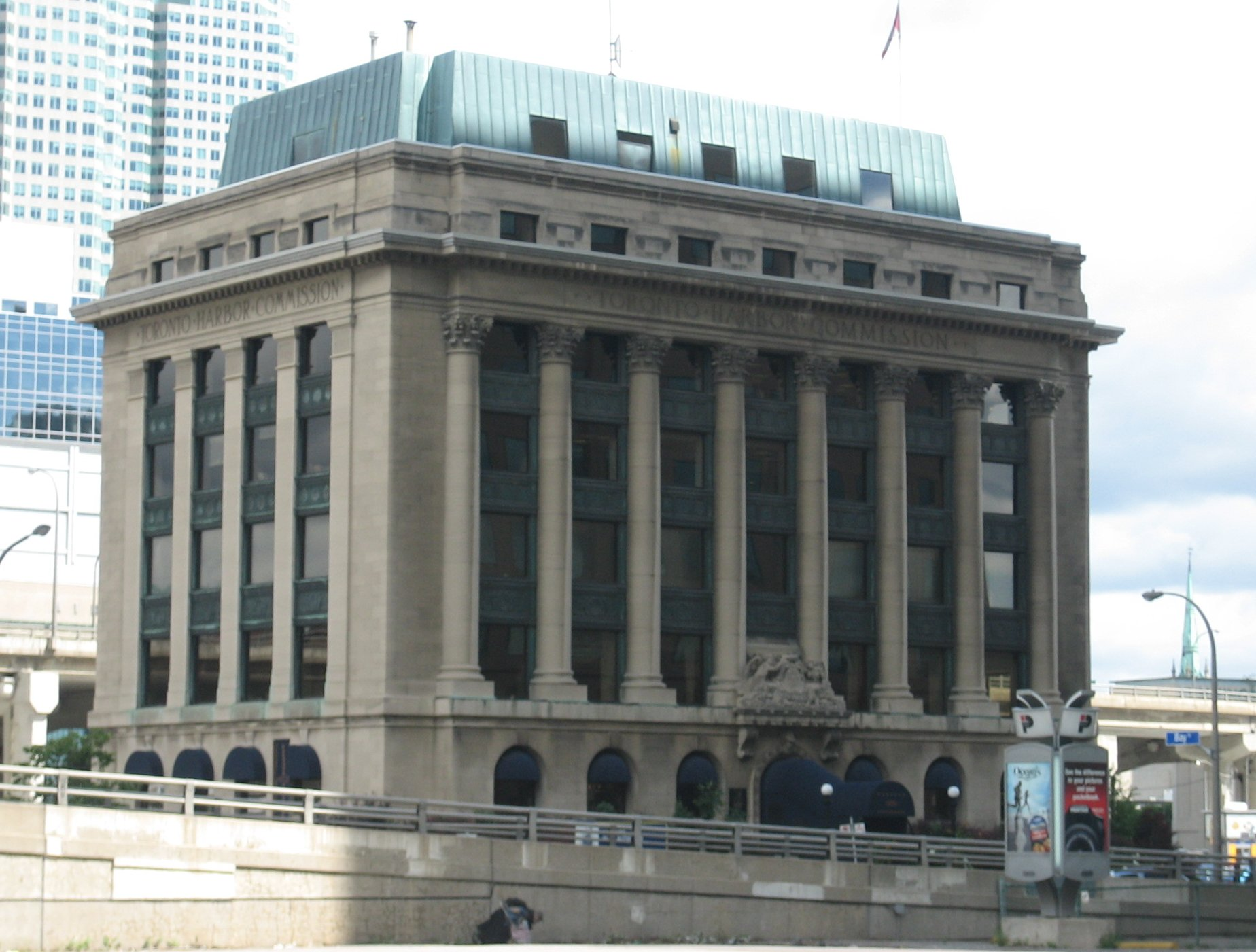
The Toronto Harbour Commission Building, the former headquarters

Other facilities operated by the Toronto Port Authority include:

- Outer Harbour Marina is located on the Leslie Street Spit in a protected channel with access to Lake Ontario and Toronto's Inner Harbour with 636 slips.
- Toronto Port Authority also offers services such as harbour maintenance, engineering services, lake-filling, shoreline protection, facility maintenance, marine services (power, water and dry dock facilities for ships), special cargo handling, dredging, topographic and hydrographic surveys, port security and many others.
- The management offices were located in the Toronto Harbour Commission Building in downtown Toronto, just south of the Air Canada Centre. The building was sold by PortsToronto in 2017 for CA$96 million to developer Oxford Properties. It is to be part of a commercial office development. In 2019, PortsToronto moved to the Queen's Quay Terminal.

=== Security ===
Toronto Port Authority Protective Services employs full-time enforcement and security officers who are responsible for the protection of passengers, personnel and facilities against acts of unlawful interference with civil aviation and marine security at Billy Bishop Toronto City Airport. Enforcement officers wear a distinctive dark-navy blue uniform with body armour while on duty. Their duties include:

- Patrolling Billy Bishop Toronto City Airport and other Toronto Port Authority properties
- Conducting marine patrols of the Toronto Harbour to ensure that vessels comply with designated marine exclusion zones set in place around the airport
- Responding to aviation and marine security incidents
- Enforcing aviation and marine security related regulations
- Explosive detection
- Support for local law enforcement, fire and paramedic services
- Customer support in both official languages

== Governance ==
PortsToronto is a public corporation. As such, it has a board of directors, appointed under regulations of the Canada Marine Act and the Letters patent of the agency. As originally set up, the board was seven members, and was made up of one member appointed by the Government of Canada, one by the city, one by the Province of Ontario, and four by the federal government in consultation with the classes of users mentioned in the letters patent. The federal government changed the Letters Patent of the TPA in 2008 to modify this to nine members. The federal Minister of Transport now nominates seven of the nine members, one as the federal government representative and six "in consultation with the users selected by the Minister, or the classes of users mentioned in Schedule D of these Letters Patent."

The current agency replaced the older Toronto Harbour Commission that had a five-member board including three City of Toronto councillors. Under the Letters Patent, no City of Toronto Councillor, Ontario Member of Parliament or Canadian Member of Parliament can be a director and no employee of the City of Toronto, Province of Ontario, or Government of Canada (or related agencies) can be a director. The 'users directors' are to be nominated by the businesses operating in the port, the airport, commercial users or recreational businesses. Like all port authorities created from harbour commissions, the aim was to update port operations so that it worked more like a business than a government agency.

This model of organization has been criticized for excluding persons or organizations that utilize the services in a non-commercial manner. The TPA has had to defend the choice and composition of the board of directors. Lisa Raitt, former TPA CEO has stated: "It's a community-based board of directors".

In 2008, board members were paid between $13,000 and $18,000 each for their services.

=== Senior management ===
- Roelof-Jan (RJ) Steenstra is the CEO as of September 2022 from Fort McMurray Airport Authority where he served as CEO since 2016.
- John Peellegoda is the CFO & Senior Vice President of Strategy.
- Warren Askew is Vice President, Airport.
- Will Ramjass is the Senior Vice President & General Counsel.
- Deborah Wilson is Vice President of Communications and Public Affairs.
- Bojan Drakul is Vice President, Infrastructure, Planning and Environment.
- Kelly McDonald is the Senior Director, HR.
- Sylvain Thériault is the Corporate Fire Chief.
- Captain Satinder Singh is Vice President, Marine.

Past members of the senior management team have included:

- Geoffrey A. Wilson joined PortsToronto on December 11, 2009 and retired June 30, 2022. Wilson was previously the chief operating officer of Cartel Communications Systems Inc. and was an executive with various transportation firms.
- Christopher Sawicki was the vice president of planning, infrastructure and environment. Joined the Toronto Transit Commission as Chief Project Manager, Major Projects.
- Gene Cabral was the executive vice president of Billy Bishop Airport and oversaw all airport operations. Gene resigned to join Avia NG Airport Consultants as CEO in 2022.
- Craig Manuel was Senior Vice President and General Counsel. Craig resigned in November 2022 to join the Kilmer Van Nostrand Co. Limited as General Counsel.
- Alan Paul was CFO. He retired in 2024.
- The Harbour Master Emeritus was Angus Armstrong, who has held the post since 2004 until his retirement.

=== Board of directors ===
Current members of the board:

- Jane McKenna (chair) – Former Progressive Conservative Member of Provincial Parliament. She has served on the PortsToronto Board since her appointment by the Provincial Government in 2023.
- Hellen Siwanowicz – legal consultant specializing in business law. Before beginning her legal consultancy, she was a partner at McMillan LLP.
- Thomas Ruth – former CEO of Edmonton International Airport and Halifax International Airports and appointed for a period of 3 years.
- Robin Pilkey – City of Toronto appointee to the Board of Directors. Formerly the Chair of the Toronto District School Board.

Past members of the board have included:

- Amanda Walton – Municipal government of Toronto appointee. Currently an independent communications consultant, she is a former senior vice president and partner of a leading Toronto communications and public affairs firm. A graduate of the University of Toronto (Victoria College), she has served as a governor of Crescent School, president of the Albany Club of Toronto, a member of the board of directors of Ontario Place and a director of the Canadian National Exhibition Association.
- Darin Deschamps – representative of the Government of Canada. Head of Wells Fargo Securities Canada, Ltd. and head of investment banking and capital markets Canada for Wells Fargo Securities.
- Sandra Pupatello – former Ontario Liberal Cabinet Minister. She was appointed to the PortsToronto Board by the Federal Government in 2023 and assumed the role of Chair in April 2024. She resigned in 2025 after being appointed to the Senate by former Prime Minister Justin Trudeau.
- Chris Reynolds - Ontario appointee. Reynolds was appointed on March 3, 2020 for three years. He is a founder and managing partner of Venn Capital, a private equity firm in Toronto. He resigned in February 2022.
- Don McIntyre – president and chief operating officer of Nemcor Incorporated – Appointed July 2018 by Minister Garneau and resigned in February 2022.
- Robert Poirier (elected chair on August 21, 2015, and ended April 16, 2021 as per legislative term limits in the Canada Marine Act). Poirier was later appointed to the Order of Ontario by Lieutenant Governor at a ceremony held on November 21, 2022 for his achievements at PortsToronto and specifically Billy Bishop Toronto City Airport. Appointed to the PortsToronto board of directors, through a legislative change, in September 2009 by Minister Baird where he was a managing director with State Street Financial in Toronto. Poirier was also senior advisor to members of the Senate Banking, Trade & Commerce Committee from 1992 to 1999.
- Jan Innes – representative of the Government of Ontario. She was the vice president of public affairs for Rogers Communications. She has served on non-profit boards, including the Toronto International Film Festival.
- Jeremy Adams – a director of government relations for a tobacco company and a past president of his university's alumni association, appointed January 2009 by then-Minister of Transport John Baird. He is a long-time Conservative Party member, having worked for Ontario minister Elizabeth Witmer, former Ontario premier Mike Harris and former provincial and current (as of 2009) federal finance minister Jim Flaherty. Adams was nominated as a 'user' representative on the board.
- G. Mark Curry – appointed September 2009 by Minister Baird. Curry is the president of Revmar Inc., an investment consulting firm located in Toronto, since 1980. He is a director of Sargasso Capital Corporation.
- David Gurin – The City of Toronto government appointed Gurin December 2008. He was the former commissioner of planning for the former Metro Toronto, and a deputy commissioner of transportation in New York.
- Paul Hayes — president of AeroCan Aviation Specialists Inc.
- Christopher M. Henley – He was appointed to the board in August 2006 by Minister of Transport Lawrence Cannon. At the time of his appointment to the board, he was president of Henley Capital Corp. and has previously served as CEO of British Petroleum Canada. Henley had 24 years of experience in industry and investment banking. Henley was paid $16,000 in 2008. He served from August 2006 until August 2009.
- Michele McCarthy – A lawyer at McCarthy Tétrault, appointed 2004 by the Ontario government. McCarthy has served as chairwoman for the board. At one point in 2006, McCarthy was the only member of the board of directors. McCarthy was paid $18,000 in 2008.
- Steve Mirkopoulos — president of Cinespace Film Studios
- Sean L. Morley – A partner in the Business Law section of the law firm Fasken Martineau, appointed December 23, 2008 by Minister of Transport Baird. He is a long-time Conservative Party member, and has worked in the past for former provincial and current (as of 2009) federal finance minister Jim Flaherty. Morley was nominated as a 'users director' on the board.
- Henry Pankratz — president of CavanCore Capital
- Douglas Reid – Teacher in business strategy at Queen's University School of Business, recently concluded a 6-year job working for an Alberta-based energy firm. Appointed by Minister Cannon in August 2006. Reid was paid $14,000 in 2008. He served from August 2006 until August 2009.
- Craig Stuart Rix – Rix was the federal government representative on the board of directors. A partner with the law firm of Hicks Morley where he works out of their Toronto offices. He serves on several boards, including the Ontario Chamber of Commerce. Rix spent three years (1996–1999) as a senior political policy advisor with the Mike Harris Ontario government. He was appointed by Minister Lawrence Cannon in 2008. Rix was paid $13,000 in 2008. Served until October 2014.
- Krista L. Scaldwell – Serves as director of consumer healthcare at Pfizer. Appointed by Minister Cannon in August 2006. Served from 2006 until August 1, 2007, but attended meetings in 2008 for which she was paid $3,000.
- Cameron J. Turner – A Canadian partner of Corporate Development International and a member of the Toronto Board of Trade. Appointed by Minister Cannon in August 2006. Served from 2006 until August 22, 2007.
- Mark McQueen (chair) – Appointed March 2008. Mark McQueen is president and CEO of Wellington Financial LP, a Toronto-based specialty finance firm. He was a banker from 1993 until December 2004 when he joined Wellington Financial full-time. He serves on the boards of the Canadian Venture Capital & Private Equity Association, and Nexient Learning Inc. He is also a past member of the board of governors of the University of Western Ontario and the board of directors of EnGlobe Corp., Intrinsyc Software and Top Aces Inc. McQueen was nominated as a 'users director' on the board. McQueen was paid $16,000 in 2008. McQueen is a Conservative Party member and worked as Hugh Segal's executive assistant in the Prime Minister Office of Brian Mulroney. McQueen donates his fees to charity.
- Colin D. Watson – He was appointed to the board in August 2006 by Minister Cannon. Until 2006, he was president and CEO of Rogers Cable and had earlier been the CEO of Spar Aerospace Limited from 1996 until 2002, and president and CEO of Vector Aerospace Corp from 2003 until 2005. One of Vector Aerospace's directors during that period was Robert Deluce, the CEO of Porter Airlines. Watson was nominated as a 'users director' on the board. Watson was paid $16,000 in 2008.

Previous CEOs/GMs include:

- John Morand
- Lisa Raitt
- Alan Paul
- Geoff Wilson

=== Financial status ===
Like other port authorities in Canada, PortsToronto is expected to be self-sufficient. From its inception until 2008, the TPA failed to turn a profit. Self-sufficiency tests conducted on behalf of Transport Canada in both 2003 and 2004 looked at the TPA's business plan for the future, allowing them to maintain their port authority status as long as they could project a profit.

The TPA introduced a $15 per flight Airport Improvement Fee in October 2006 on passengers departing on scheduled flights from the airport which, by 2008, generated enough revenues for the TPA to make a profit for the first time. The fee generated $1.983 million in 2007 and $3.877 million in 2008. In its 2008 financial report, the TPA's Statement of Revenue and Expenses shows an income from operations of $2.251 million, with overall net income of $863,000, compared to a loss on operations of $1.877 million in 2007. For the first six months of 2009, the TPA had a net income of $1.154 million, 34% more than the net income reported for all of fiscal 2008. The TPA did post a profit in 2009, and announced it had also made a $7.1 million profit for 2010, and nearly doubling that with a $13.9 million profit in 2011. The year 2015 marked PortsToronto's eighth consecutive year of profitability with an operating net income of $5.9 million.

== History ==
=== Creation ===
Prior to 1999, Toronto's harbour was managed by the Toronto Harbour Commission (THC), created by a federal act in 1911. At first, the commission managed the harbour as well as waterfront lands across the then City of Toronto beyond the harbour area, including the Sunnyside waterfront area, east of the Humber River. Over time, the facilities and lands other than the inner and outer harbour and the airport were transferred to the management of the City of Toronto and other authorities, leaving the THC to manage the airport and harbour. The THC received lease revenues and subsidies from the various governments to carry on its activities.

Starting in December 1994, the House of Commons of Canada's Standing Committee on Transport initiated a study of Canada's marine transportation sector. After consultations across the country, the committee produced its National Marine Strategy in May 1995. In December 1995, the Government of Canada announced a new National Marine Policy to reform the governance of ports, harbours and the St. Lawrence Seaway. The plan was to modernize the system, and divest the government of port operations and make the financially self-sufficient where possible. At the time, there were 2,700 ports under federal government authority. The vast majority were reclassified as regional or local. Under the divestiture, the government was to offer the Transport Canada harbours to other federal departments, then provinces and territories, and finally to industries or municipalities. Similar divestitures had taken place previously in the field of airport management.

In June 1996, the Government of Canada introduced the Canada Marine Act. The Act would enable the creation of port authorities, commercialize the St. Lawrence Seaway and divest ports and harbours. A schedule of the Act listed eight ports to be covered and did not include Toronto. Transport Canada held consultations on the plan and the City of Toronto did not participate, expecting that Toronto Harbour would not be covered by the Act. From July to October 1996, a study was done by accounting firm Nesbitt Burns of other possible ports, including Toronto. Nesbitt Burns concluded that Toronto was not self-sufficient and should not be included. In April 1997, the Act was approved by Parliament with an amendment to add eight other ports, including Toronto.

At the Senate, Jack Layton, then the chair of the City Planning and Transportation Committee of Metro Council, and Martin Silva, a THC commissioner appeared to argue against the inclusion of Toronto under the Act as it would make it difficult for the city to harmonize its waterfront plans with a port authority. THC chairman Charles Parmelee and Howard Joy, THC vice-chairmen appeared to argue that the Toronto Port should be included. The federal election of 1997 intervened and the bill died. The Act was re-introduced by Minister of Transport David Collenette in October 1997. The list included Toronto. Collenette spoke to the inclusion of Toronto, stating:

"While there had been some degree of controversy about the designation of Toronto as a Canadian Port Authority, this certainly was not from the Members of Parliament from the Toronto area, who insisted on this being included in the last Bill. The provincial government and most municipal leaders, business leaders and others in the Toronto area, supported this designation. The harbour could attract new business and grow from just being where it was and that a port authority representing users, more reflective of a commercial approach, taking the matter out of the hands of local politicians and indeed even, I suppose, other politicians would be a better way to develop the port."

In February 1998, Toronto City Council passed a resolution opposing the bill. The City opposed the bill because the Port of Toronto did not qualify under the criteria proposed by the Act, the diminishing role of the city, difficulties in the planning of land development and the exclusion of elected councillors serving on the TPA board of directors. This was brought to the Senate's attention in an appearance of Toronto's Chief Planner at a Senate hearing in April 1998. The Act was passed in May 1998 with the only amendment being the addition of Hamilton to the Schedule.

The Toronto Port Authority (TPA) came into being on June 8, 1999, and the THC was dissolved. The Letters Patent for the new organization provided for it to be governed as an independent agency, with seven directors, one each to be chosen by the federal, provincial and municipal governments, and the others to be representative of the commercial users of the harbour. The TPA received the harbour assets of the former Commission, including inner and outer harbour lands, the airport and the Harbour Commission building. Like the other port authorities, it was to be self-sufficient in its activities, charging fees to the users of the harbour and airport.

=== 2001–2004 Lands dispute and airport bridge plan ===
In 2001, the TPA filed a $1 billion CAD lawsuit over 600 acres (240 ha) of land that was transferred in the 1990s to the City of Toronto's Toronto Economic Development Corporation (TEDCO) by the Toronto Harbour Commission. The disputed lands, mostly the infill lands of the Don River delta, constituted around 85% of the THC's land assets as of the early 1990s. The lands had been transferred in two separate agreements, in 1991 and 1994 in exchange for a permanent subsidy for the THC. The TPA's legal claim was that the transfer had been done while the majority of directors of the THC were City-appointed, and who had acted in the city's interest and not in the commission's 'fiduciary interest'. And that the deals crippled the THC's ability to be self-sufficient by ending any potential revenues from those lands. As the TPA was inheriting the role and activities of the THC, it was thus crippled itself.

TEDCO and the city had earmarked the lands for waterfront revitalization upon the recommendations of the Crombie Commission on the Waterfront. Thus, while the TPA was seeking approval of the Island Airport fixed link, it potentially threatened the ability of the city to proceed on waterfront revitalization. City Council, leading up to the debate on the fixed link plan, made the settlement of the lawsuit a condition of the approval of the fixed link. On November 28, 2002, Council in a day-long debate, made two votes to settle the issue. First, Council voted 32–9 to accept a settlement to end the TPA port-lands lawsuit in exchange for an immediate payment of $5.5 million and an annual subsidy of $5.5 million to the TPA until 2012. Council then voted 29–11 to approve the amendment of the tripartite agreement to permit a fixed link and the construction of a lift bridge. In return, the TPA dropped its claim to the lands and the permanent subsidy in exchange for money and permission to build the fixed link. In its estimation, the TPA would thus be able to be self-sufficient and contribute to waterfront revitalization.

In 2002, the TPA made plans to link the airport to the mainland with a new bridge to support an expansion of services. At the time, a TPA-sponsored public opinion poll showed that Torontonians supported maintaining the airport over converting it to a park. On November 28, 2002, Toronto City Council, led by then-mayor Mel Lastman, approved the amendment of the tripartite agreement to permit a fixed link and the construction of a lift bridge.

The next year, a municipal election year, saw public opinion change to oppose the bridge. In October 2003, a Toronto Star poll listed 53% of residents citywide opposed the airport bridge, while 36% supported it. Councillor David Miller ran for mayor on a platform to stop the building of the bridge, a position supported by Community Air and other local community groups. Other mayoral candidates Barbara Hall and John Tory supported the bridge. Despite the bridge being an election issue, the Port Authority continued developing the project, progressing to the point that contracts were signed with major participants (including companies operating from the airport).

On November 10, 2003, Mr. Miller was elected Mayor of Toronto with 44% of the vote. While construction workers prepared the construction site, Miller immediately started the process to cancel the bridge project, sparking threats of a lawsuit from the TPA. The incoming city council voted 26–18 on December 3, 2003, to withdraw its support of the bridge project and federal Transport Minister David Collenette announced that the federal government accepted the council's position on the bridge and withdrew its support.

In January 2004, the federal government put approval of the project on hold, preventing its construction. Immediately, regional airline proponent Robert Deluce filed a $505 million lawsuit against the City of Toronto, claiming that Miller "abused his powers", by threatening councillors, had Toronto Fire Services and Toronto Hydro "interfere with the construction of a fixed link" and lobbying the federal government to "withhold certain permits." The federal government later transferred $35 million to the TPA in May 2005 to settle claims arising from the cancellation from Deluce, Aecon Construction and Stolport Corp. Compensation terms were not disclosed. Lisa Raitt, Port Authority CEO was quoted as saying "You will never hear about the bridge again." and "We have been working very hard since December of 2003 to deal with the request of the City of Toronto not to build a bridge, and we are very happy that the matter has been dealt with." New federal regulations were introduced to ban any future plans to build a fixed link to the airport.

=== 2003–06: Ferry to Rochester ===
As the bridge dispute was ending, the TPA was embarking on a plan to bring a fast ferry service between Toronto and Rochester. By December 2003, the ferry terminal was already built in Rochester. The TPA agreed to use $8 million in funds from the City of Toronto lands dispute settlement to build a terminal near Cherry Beach on TPA land. Using a temporary terminal, the ferry, named the Spirit of Ontario I, started the service in June 2004, operated by Canadian American Transportation Systems (CATS) while the permanent terminal was being constructed. Although popular with Rochester visitors to Toronto, carrying 130,000 passengers, CATS failed after only a few months in September 2004, $2.1 million in debt. The failure was attributed to unexpected costs of Canada Customs fees, US border security not allowing transport trucks onto the ferry and CATS' under-capitalization.

The TPA stopped construction of the terminal, which had increased in price to $10.5 million, but restarted construction after the City of Rochester made plans to purchase the ferry and restart the service. The new passenger terminal building opened in June 2005. It included a Canada Customs station. It was the first new border crossing between Canada and the United States in over 40 years. It would be the only year of service for the station. Ferry service was halted in January 2006 when a newly elected city council in Rochester cancelled funding, after incurring costs of US$10 million in 2005. In the aftermath of the ferry service Toronto's terminal was closed down. However, with the reemergence of a Great Lakes cruise industry by 2019 the old ferry terminal docked 36 cruise ships carrying 12,000 passengers including 2 cruise ships and almost 1,000 passengers on October 14, 2019.

=== 2006 Federal review ===
On May 1, 2006, the Government of Canada Transport Minister Lawrence Cannon announced that a review of the agency would be conducted. The review was carried out by Roger Tassé (a former deputy Minister of Justice). The review looked into the history and operations of the government agency, including the contracts it signed for the airport bridge. The report was completed in October 2006. The review found that "the TPA has in all respects complied with due diligence requirements and the generally respected principles of good governance".

The report made four recommendations:

- (on transparency and accountability) – That the TPA adopt changes to its organization, produce an annual report and fulfil its reporting in a timely manner.
- (on community relations) – That the TPA be more pro-active in its approach to community consultations.
- (on board of directors vacancies) – That the agreement be amended to allow the continuation of board membership past expiry.
- (on federal interest in the Toronto Port and Airport) – That the federal government, in particular, elected members, participate in discussions as to the federal interest.

Source: "Review of the Toronto Port Authority Report, General Observations and Recommendations". Archived from the original on 2008-01-27.

Critics of the airport were less than enthusiastic about the report. NDP MP Olivia Chow, a frequent critic, called it a "total whitewash" while Toronto Mayor David Miller said the document is "not worth the paper it's written on". In responding to the criticism, Mr. Tassé defended the report and questioned whether critics such as Miller and Chow had even read it.

=== 2006-present: Launch of Porter and profitability ===
In 2006, Porter Airlines started service at the airport. Porter had purchased the island terminal, which was then used by an Air Canada budget operation called Jazz, and evicted the competitor from the airport. The TPA banned Jazz from using other airport facilities without a contract with the TPA and Jazz abandoned the airport and filed a lawsuit. During this time, the TPA was under the Tassé review, and had only one member on its board of directors, Michele McCarthy, the Ontario representative on the board. Ottawa did not appoint directors during the review, and Toronto refused to name a director, in opposition to the TPA's existence.

That same year, the TPA invested $15 million in upgrades to the island airport, including a new ferry, the TCCA1, to replace the old ferry to the airport. The TPA also imposed a $15 airport improvement fee, which along with the increase in passengers for Porter's service has increased the TPA's revenues to the point where in 2008, it reported its first profit on revenues. The TPA has purchased a new ferry for the airport using the airport improvement fees. The ferry purchase lead to a TPA board of directors dispute and conflict-of-interest investigation.

In 2009, the TPA proposed a new $38 million pedestrian tunnel to the airport. The TPA sought to have the project paid for out of federal and provincial governments economic stimulus program funds. TPA critics Olivia Chow, David Miller and Adam Vaughan publicly stated their opposition to the tunnel. According to Community Air, the tunnel is not allowed by the regulation imposed in 2005 that prohibits a fixed link to the airport. Mark McQueen, TPA chair has stated that the regulation does not apply to a tunnel. The TPA released a poll showing that 62% of Toronto residents support the tunnel. The tunnel project has also garnered the support of the Toronto Board of Trade and Economic Club of Canada business associations and Ornge, the medevac provider. The TPA abandoned the project in October 2009, when it determined it could not finish the project on time to qualify for stimulus funds.

Although the fast ferry to Rochester had failed, the TPA continued to receive money from the City of Rochester for rent of the cruise ship terminal. This ended in December 2009 in a settlement between the TPA and Rochester, where the TPA received $90,000 to terminate the lease. The TPA had been renting the terminal for use in a television series.

In 2010, the TPA relaunched its plan to build the pedestrian tunnel to the island airport. According to the new plan, the tunnel would be funded by passenger user fees and be built in a commercial partnership. In July 2010, the TPA announced that it would start an environmental assessment of its own on the project and hoped to start construction of the tunnel in 2011. The TPA also announced that a poll conducted on behalf of the TPA suggested that "a majority (56%) of Torontonians support a pedestrian tunnel to the island airport." On September 24, 2013, the City of Toronto published the results of an Environics poll which stated "A telephone survey commissioned by the city concluded that "half of Torontonians say that an expanded airport with jets does not fit with the revitalized waterfront, and Toronto residents living in the waterfront area are most likely to say that the airport does not fit."

== Controversies ==
Since its inception, the TPA has been involved in various disputes with the City of Toronto, Air Canada, Community Air and local community groups. These battles mostly are about the Island airport. In 2009, it became public knowledge that the directors of the agency were divided. Several of the dissident directors, appointed by the federal government, were replaced by new federal government appointees.

=== 2009 Board of Directors dispute ===
In June 2009, it became public knowledge that four members (Mr. David Gurin, Mr. Chris Henley, Ms. Michele McCarthy and Mr. Doug Reid) of the TPA board of directors sent a letter in March 2009 to Minister of Transport John Baird on the topics of "Conflict of interest, Expenses, Procurement policy, Information Flow, Audit Committee access, Board counsel termination and Illegal chair election" at the TPA, according to a June 8, 2009 press release from Board Chair Mark McQueen. McQueen termed the letter as:

"nothing more than an effort by a disgruntled minority of our Board to smear the reputation of those members of the Board who support the existence of the Toronto City Centre Airport ("TCCA") and who voted in favour of a new, larger passenger ferry in January 2009"

The press release was in response to Olivia Chow, MP for Trinity-Spadina, holding a press conference to release the letter, which Chow characterized as "explosive allegations of misconduct against some Toronto Port Authority Board members and staff." Chow wrote to the Auditor General of Canada Sheila Fraser on June 5, 2009, to ask for an audit of the authority. At the news conference, the contents of the letter were released. The practices that the directors objected to included annual expenses of $50,000 on meals at the Harbour 60 restaurant, $80,000 in expenses by Lisa Raitt and $65,000 paid to a legal firm whose legal opinion was with-held from other board members. Chow called for an immediate investigation into the agency.

In November 2009, the Toronto Star published its investigation of Chow's charges. The Star found that the election of Mark McQueen as chair of the TPA was contested. McQueen was elected chair at the March 2008 directors' meeting, replacing Michelle McCarthy, the Province of Ontario representative. Only five of the six board members were present, and no notice was given to the directors that a vote to replace McCarthy would take place. The election was disputed, with the TPA's own legal firm stating that the regulations were not followed, and the election "unlawful". Under the direction of McQueen and Raitt, another law firm was engaged to provide a second legal opinion. The second opinion dissented from the first, stating that the election was lawful. The December 2008 meeting of the TPA was held under the chairmanship of McQueen, although this was contested by McCarthy. The Star published the minutes as taken at the meeting, which were signed by Henley, listing McQueen as only attending. However, a revised minutes document was made that listed McQueen as chair, with controversial material removed, such as complaints over the interference of the Minister of Transport Lawrence Cannon and his staff. According to McQueen, the original minutes were an attempt to embarrass certain board members, and the 'unnecessary verbiage' removed. A January 21, 2009 meeting of the TPA board, with its three new directors (two appointed by the federal government and the third by the City of Toronto) subsequently voted for a second time to name McQueen as chair by a 5–4 vote.

The TPA took issue with the Toronto Star investigation, declaring it "rife with errors and falsehoods", having a "lack of balance" and "Linda Diebel had information and documents in hand which demonstrated that she was being misled by biased sources, she inexplicably proceeded to publish serious and false accusations." On November 6, the TPA published several budget documents to document the inaccuracies in the investigation. As part of the 2008 budget, the TPA had pre-approved a trip to London by Raitt, which director McCarthy said was not approved, and that Raitt had signed off on. The Star had incorrectly noted that Alan Paul had approved the minutes, when in fact it was Ron Paul, a legal trainee, however the TPA did not dispute that the minutes had been changed. The Star published a notice of correction. In a November 2009 press release, the TPA noted that "the Star has yet to acknowledge the failings in the series nor has it apologized for the false accusations made in the first two articles."

The opposition Liberals and NDP both demanded that Ottawa conduct an investigation of the TPA and Raitt's expenses. Raitt declared that she is in caught in the middle of a dispute between two groups of directors on the TPA board. After delaying a final part of its investigation, the Star published its final part of its investigation, detailing the use of public relations firms by the TPA to counter its critics. One of the firms used for strategic communications purposes is Liberal strategist Warren Kinsella's Daisy Consulting Group.

=== Conflict of interest probe ===
In April 2009, Federal Ethics Commissioner Mary Dawson began investigating the TPA board of directors over conflict of interest. The probe revolved around the TPA's controversial vote to purchase a new island airport ferry in January 2009, a vote of 5–4 in favour. The ethics commission did not name the board member under investigation, but the Ottawa Citizen reported that board members were asked about director Colin Watson and his relationship with Porter Airlines' CEO Robert Deluce. Watson contended that the investigation "was a result of political tensions on the Port Authority's board of directors". On June 25, 2009, Dawson's report was released, revealing that it was Watson who was under investigation. Dawson specifically cleared board member Watson of conflict of interest. Ms. Dawson stated: "I believe that Mr. Watson exercised his duties both as a Director of the Toronto Port Authority and as Chair of the Audit & Finance Committee with the genuine conviction that the new ferry was a good thing for the TPA as a whole and for the Airport's primary user, Porter Airlines. I do not believe that Mr. Watson was motivated by a desire to further the private interests of Mr. Deluce. I am therefore satisfied that Mr. Watson did not 'improperly' further the private interests of Mr. Deluce."

=== 2008–09 Board Appointments ===
In December 2008 and January 2009, the Government of Canada, appointed two new members to the board of directors of the Authority, expanding the number of directors to nine. This was done after the City of Toronto named a representative to the board, and the existing board voted against expanding the board size. The Letters Patent were modified in December 2008 to raise the number of directors to nine, it was originally seven. The Harper government then named two new directors. The new members, both having ties to the Conservative Party of Canada, were criticized on their merits and the appearance of patronage. Toronto Councillor Adam Vaughan, whose ward includes the Island Airport, and who has been critical of the TPA in the past, called Jeremy Adams's appointment "absolutely unacceptable", and the two appointments amounting to the federal government "stacking" the board with pro-Airport members. Chris Day, a spokesman for federal Transport Minister John Baird was quoted as stating that "is taking steps to preserve the Island Airport's continued status as an important catalyst for Toronto's economic competitiveness". The number of board members now totals nine, which is two more than the seaports of Montreal and Halifax and one fewer than Vancouver.

=== Lobbying efforts ===
In 2006, the TPA was criticized for its use of lobbyists by Olivia Chow, NDP MP for the riding including the Airport. Chow accused the governing Harper government of backing down on a promise to slay cronyism in Ottawa because Tory-connected lobbyists were pushing the expansion of Toronto's controversial island airport. Then-CEO Lisa Raitt stated that the Port Authority spends around CDN $50,000 a year on lobbyists, and confirmed that their lobbyists are: Peter Naglik (a former speech writer for Prime Minister Stephen Harper), Vic Gupta (Ontario PC Party treasurer, former deputy campaign manager for John Tory's 2003 failed bid for Toronto Mayor, and until June 2006 on Jane Pitfield's election team) and Bill Hearn (lawyer).

=== Breaches of Landing Curfew Times ===
It was reported at the TPA public meeting of September 2009 that Porter has landed its planes at the airport without any air traffic controllers on duty. And that Porter has been landing planes after the 11:00 flight curfew, when such flights should have been diverted to Toronto Pearson International (where air traffic controllers are on duty at all hours). There are no regulations that prohibit aircraft from landing at the TCCA when no air traffic controllers are present. Curfew breaches have occurred and are handled on a case-by-case basis by the TPA. The TPA may fine Porter, Air Canada or any other airline in violation of the curfew $5,000 for each such landing.

== Lawsuits ==
=== Dispute over payments in lieu of taxes to the City of Toronto ===
Federal agencies such as the TPA do not pay property taxes as such, but instead some negotiated amount to account for municipal services, known as 'Payments in lieu of taxes' (PILTs). For the period from 1999 until 2008, the Toronto Port Authority did not make payments in lieu of property tax to the City of Toronto on the Island Airport in a dispute over the amount of the payment. In April 2006, the City applied to the Federal PILTs Dispute Advisory Panel. The City withheld $10 million in contractual payments owed to the TPA pending the dispute resolution.

By 2009, the City estimated that the port authority owed $37 million in unpaid payments in lieu of property tax. This value was based on the land value of the property, its assessed value as calculated by the Ontario government assessment agency. In 2008, the City and TPA submitted their case to the Dispute Advisory Panel. On January 26, 2009, the Dispute Advisory Panel recommended an amount of $5 million that the Port Authority must pay. This value was based on similar payments made by other airports, which make the payments based on passenger numbers. Pearson Airport, at the time of the ruling paid 94 cents per passenger. The ruling by the Dispute Panel works out to 80 cents per passenger. On February 10, 2009, the City applied for a judicial review to the Federal Court of Canada.

On November 25, 2009, the City and the TPA came to an agreement in principle to settle all outstanding legal issues. Both sides agreed to accept the other's estimate of monies owned. The city will pay $11.4 million owing on payments related to the 2002 property settlement and $380,559 owing on harbour user fees. The TPA will pay the City $6.4 million owned to resolve the dispute over the PILTs. The agreement, which was ratified by Toronto City Council in 2010, was made in conjunction with the transfer of 18 acres (7.3 ha) of land at Leslie Street and Lake Shore Boulevard for a proposed Toronto Transit Commission (TTC) light rail storage facility. The settlement still left the airport, 80 Cherry Street and the Outer Harbour to be settled.

In April 2013, Toronto Council voted against adopting a tax agreement over the airport, under which the TPA would have paid PILTs for the airport on a per passenger basis at a rate of 94 cents per passenger, the same rate paid by Pearson Airport. In January 2014, the two sides agreed to the rate of 94 cents per passenger, settling the dispute over the airport. The settlement was reached in 2015 for the remaining properties on Cherry Street and the Outer Harbour Marina and a regular PILTs payment schedule is now established.

=== Air Canada Jazz vs. TPA and Porter ===
On February 15, 2006, Air Canada announced that their lease for use of terminal space controlled by City Centre Aviation (CCAL) at the Toronto City Centre Airport was terminated by CCAL. CCAL had been bought out by REGCO Holdings (now Porter Aviation Holdings) as a precursor to the terminal facility being used for Porter Airlines. On February 27, 2006, Air Canada lost a court appeal against REGCO and eventually abandoned its legal case against REGCO in August 2006.

However Air Canada Jazz was not completely finished. In July 2006, Jazz announced that it would resume operations at the airport as of August 2006. However the TPA countered that Jazz could not operate without a 'commercial carrier operating agreement', which Jazz refused to sign, because it would "unfairly limit its access to the facilities." Unable to fly without the TPA authority, Jazz discontinued its plans to resume flights one month later.

Jazz filed a $11.5 million lawsuit against the TPA and later, Porter, in the Ontario Superior Court in February 2006, alleging that the TPA signed contracts forcing Jazz out of the airport, causing a monopoly at the airport, and were anti-competitive. Jazz later filed a suit in Federal Court. On October 20, 2009, Jazz formally dropped its suit in Ontario Court, but plans to continue its lawsuit against Porter and the TPA in Federal Court. According to the announcement, Jazz dropped the matter in provincial court as the TPA is a federal agency, and the Airport is a federal facility. Damages in the federal case are not specified. Porter filed a counter-claim to Jazz' lawsuit citing damages of $850 million, based on Jazz agreement with Air Canada, and Porter has not dropped its counter-claim.

Air Canada abandoned its legal actions in the Federal Court, but pursued a judicial review of TPA's plans to open the airport to other airlines. The action was heard in Federal Court in July 2010, and the Court dismissed Air Canada's claims against the TPA's decisions of December 2009 and April 2010 with respect to the airport slot allocations.

=== 2006 TPA vs. Community Air lawsuit ===
In 2006, the TPA launched a lawsuit against the Community Air community group for $3.4 million CAD. The lawsuit claimed that the group and its directors were "zealous and unbalanced" in their waterfront advocacy. TPA CEO Lisa Raitt stated in the media that: "We are not going to allow untruths and personal attacks to go unchallenged". The suit demanded that each pay $500,000 in damages for defamation, $250,000 in aggravated damages and another $100,000 in punitive damages to the port authority, its president Lisa Raitt and two others. "We really view this as being a 'SLAPP suit' and that's a type of lawsuit that is carried out against community groups and individuals to prevent them from speaking their minds about issues of public importance," said Community Air's lawyer Louis Sokolov in conversation with CBC reporters. According to the National Post, the complaint stemmed from a Community Air memo sent to then Minister of Transport Lawrence Cannon, describing the TPA as a "painful thorn in the side of the city". Cannon later initiated the Tassé review of the TPA.

In May 2007, the lawsuit was settled out of court. Community Air agreed to retract their statements and apologize. A spokesperson for Community Air said that it hoped that would foster a better relationship with the TPA. Since the settlement, Community Air continues to criticize the agency.

=== 2008 TPA vs City of Toronto Lawsuit ===
In 2008, the TPA launched a lawsuit against the City of Toronto to prevent a 'no-stopping' bylaw for the roadway in front of the ferry dock. The City intends to build a sidewalk for a nearby school, according to Councillor Adam Vaughan. Lawyers for the TPA and Porter Airlines characterized the bylaw as "guerilla tactics" to disrupt the Airport's operations. In a December 23, 2008 Ontario Superior Court decision a judge dismissed the city's arguments as "unreasonable" and directed the city to immediately approve the TPA's early 2006 request to perform basic work to the TPA's Bathurst Street lot.

== Positions on the Port Authority ==
=== Conservative Party of Canada ===
The Conservative Party of Canada supports the TPA and the operation of Porter Airlines. During the 2006 federal election, Stephen Harper chose not to comment on the airport expansion, but after the election, the new government appointed several Tory party members to the board. In December 2008 and January 2009, the party nominated two further party members to the TPA board after the City of Toronto named its representative to the TPA board. Former TPA CEO Lisa Raitt became the Conservative MP for Halton Region, and was named Minister of Natural Resources. In September 2009, Minister of Transport John Baird named a party fund-raiser to the board.

=== Liberal Party of Canada ===
The TPA was created in 1999, during a period of government of the Liberal Party of Canada. Several Toronto Liberal MPs were strong supporters of the TPA, including Dennis Mills, Tony Ianno, and David Collenette. Under Prime Minister Paul Martin, the Liberals canceled construction of the airport bridge at the request of city council after the 2003 municipal election. This marked the second time that a Liberal prime minister cancelled a link to the airport. In the 1930s, the Liberal government led by William Lyon Mackenzie King cancelled a tunnel linking the airport. In the 2006 federal election, several local Liberal MPs went on the record as opposing the airport expansion. The Liberals publicly criticized the appointment of Tory fundraiser Robert Poirier to the TPA Board as a "patronage appointment."

=== New Democratic Party ===
The New Democratic Party wants the agency shut down. During her time as a Member of Parliament from Toronto, Olivia Chow was the most prominent critic of the TPA and the airport expansion. Chow, whose riding included the airport, wants control of the port passed to the city and introduced a private member's bill to do so. Federal party leader Jack Layton (Chow's then husband), who represented a nearby riding, had stated that he wanted the auditor-general to investigate the settlement surrounding the failed airport bridge.

=== Mayor David Miller ===
The former mayor of Toronto, David Miller won his 2003 election partly on the campaign pledge to prevent "airport expansion" – the construction of a bridge connecting the airport to the mainland. Miller has stated publicly that he wants Toronto to regain control over the Port Authority: "I've never believed we needed a port authority," and "It doesn't really perform any function. Shipping is not at a level that it needs it." When discussing the creation of a new airline the mayor was quoted as saying: "This is a federal agency that is under federal control that has never respected the wishes of the people of the City of Toronto, and it's the federal government that will have to bring it to heel." Miller has publicly stated his opposition to the proposed pedestrian tunnel to the airport.

=== Toronto Board of Trade ===
The Board of Trade produced a report in 2006 appealing to the city and to the TPA to start working together, citing an estimated positive economic impact of over $135 million from the airport. To quote Glen Stone, a Board of Trade spokesman:

There are two facts that are inescapable: Number one, there is an airport on the island. Number two, just a few hundred metres away there is a city. Neither of them are about to go away. So the two sides can continue fighting and feuding or they can realize that they can benefit from each other through a bit of compromise and co-operation. Both sides could be winners instead of dragging each other down.

— Glen Stone

Among the recommendations were increasing the number of Toronto-appointed board members, operating the airport without any subsidies and resolving any back tax disputes. The TPA welcomed the report, but Mayor Miller noted that the plan "falls short of identifying a fundamental change that needs to be made."

=== Toronto City Council ===
Prior to the formation of the TPA, city council voted twice in favour of a bridge to the airport. On the TPA, Council was in favour of bringing the port under the city's umbrella. When the TPA sued the city, city council voted again to support the bridge. However, after the retirement of former mayor Mel Lastman, who supported the expansion of the airport, the council changed. The council elected in 2003 along with Mayor Miller, voted to cancel the bridge project. A municipal election was held in 2006 and a majority of councilors supporting Mayor Miller were elected. After Trinity-Spadina Councillor Olivia Chow moved to federal politics, Adam Vaughan was elected in her place to council, and he is a vocal opponent of airport expansion.

=== Residents of Toronto ===
In 2009, a TPA-sponsored poll showed that 58% of Toronto residents supported the TPA remaining independent. In August 2014, an Ipsos Reid Poll found that 91% of Toronto residents stated that the airport was a valuable asset for the city.

As of 2009, local community associations and the main opposition group "Community Air" remain opposed to the Island Airport. When Porter Airlines first started flights, protests and boycotts were called for, however the actual amount of active protest has died down. As recently as April 24, 2009, the vice-chair of Community Air stated "The fight to shutter the airport is far from over."

== Arms ==
Coat of arms of Toronto Port Authority
Notes Granted 15 June 2022. Escutcheon Or a fouled anchor bendwise sinister, on a chief wavy Azure two wings conjoined in fess Or. Badge The shield of the Arms within an annulus Azure edged and inscribed TORONTO PORT AUTHORITY and ADMINISTRATION PORTUAIRE DE TORONTO in letters Or, all within a wreath of maple leaves Or issuant from a trillium and ensigned by the Royal Crown proper.

== See also ==
- Outer Harbour East Headland
- Toronto waterfront
- Greater Toronto Airports Authority
- Regina Airport Authority
- Edmonton Airports
- Vancouver Airport Services
- Halifax International Airport Authority
