= Toronto Harbour Commission Building =

Building in Toronto, Canada

Coordinates: 43.642027°N 79.378442°W

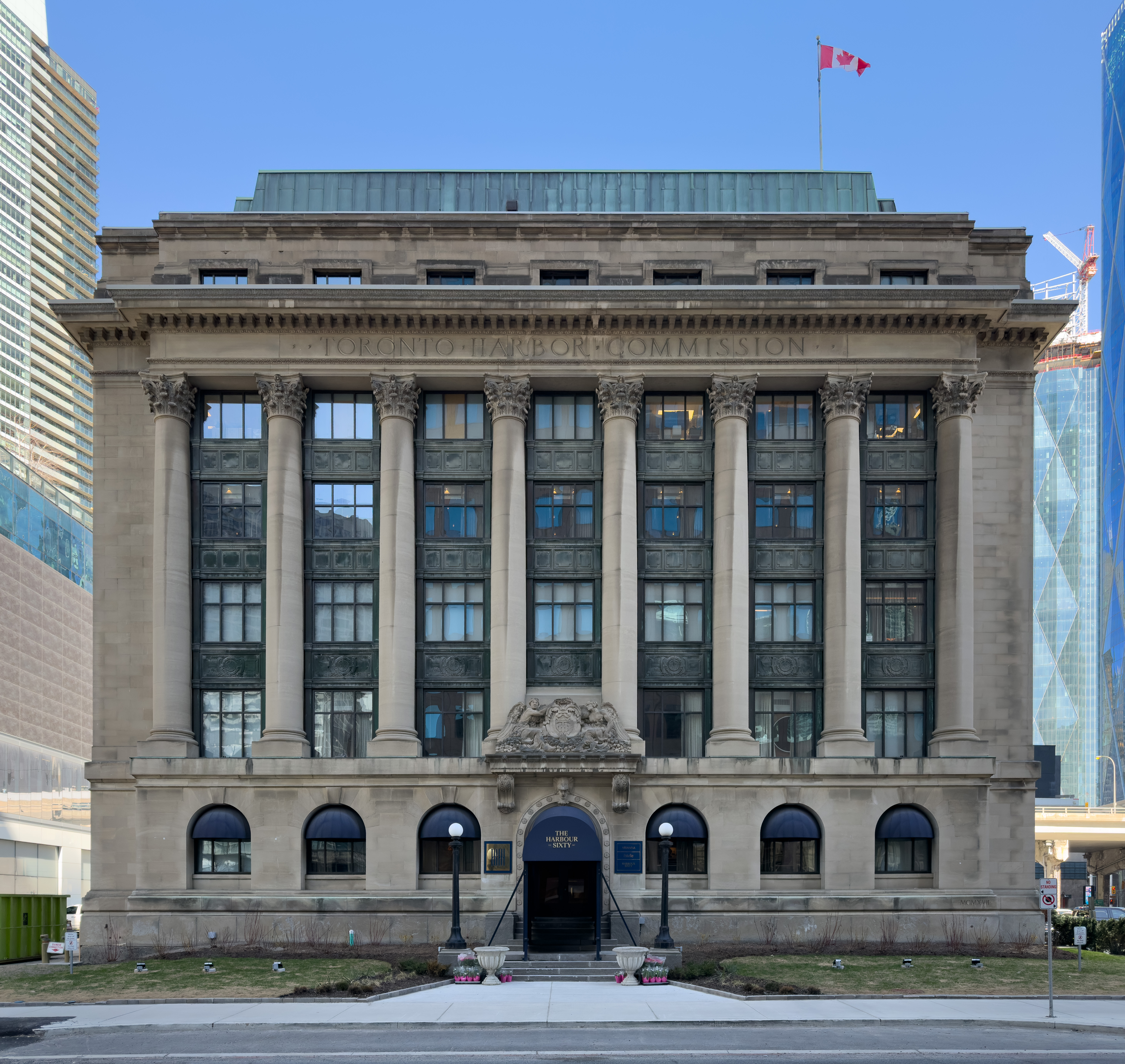
The Toronto Harbour Commission Building

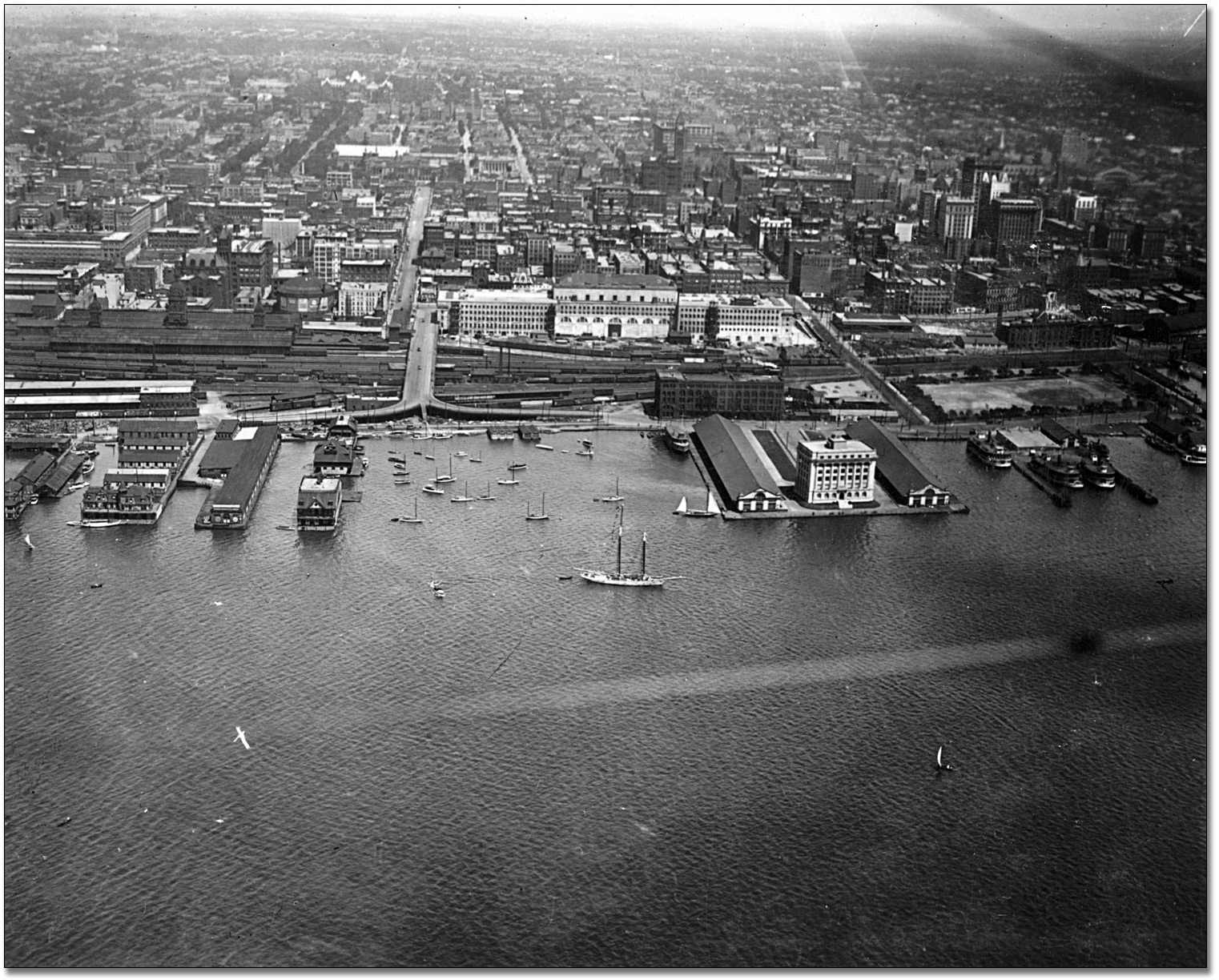
The Toronto Harbour Commission Building can be seen at the end of the wharf in this 1919 photograph. It is now well inland, illustrating infill of the harbour over the years.

The Toronto Harbour Commission Building is a six-storey building erected in 1917 in Toronto by Alfred Chapman and McGiffin (Clare V. McGiffin and Robert B. McGiffin) for the joint municipal-federal agency Toronto Harbour Commission. The building exterior consists of Indiana and Queenston limestone. It was also used by its successor agency PortsToronto, a federal agency formerly known as the Toronto Port Authority. The lower floor is home to Harbour Sixty Steakhouse.

Formerly sitting on the waterfront, infill over the years has left the building on dry land, and civic expansion has left it dwarfed by nearby buildings.

Since 1953, the building has been rumoured to be haunted by the ghost of Thomas Cates, its former janitor, who died of natural causes while working his night shift. He is most often seen in glimpses in the north-western stairwell, where he will be sweeping or mopping the floor.

The building was sold by PortsToronto in 2017 for CA$96 million to developer Oxford Properties. It is to be part of a commercial office development named The Hub. It was originally built at a cost of $247,000.
