= Community Air =

Community Air is a non-profit resident association in the city of Toronto, Ontario, Canada that seeks to have the Toronto Island Airport shut down and its lands converted to parkland. The association is concerned about noise, pollution and safety aspects of the airport's operation. The group has regularly held protests at the airport site and at the general meetings of the airport's operator (the Toronto Port Authority).

== History ==
Opposition to the island airport goes back to the 1930s, when a plan to build a tunnel to the islands for a new airport was shut down after a federal election. The Toronto mayor at the time was a Toronto Islands resident and opponent of the project. After his death, Toronto City Council revived the airport project, without the tunnel, to be Toronto's main airport. This airport has remained in use since 1939, serving mainly general aviation. An airport at Malton, Ontario instead became Toronto's main airport and is today's Pearson Airport.

A plan was raised in the 1970s to add scheduled passenger service at the island airport by federal politicians. At the time, Toronto was a two-tier government. The City of Toronto was part of Metropolitan Toronto. Local opposition appeared to the plan to add planes to the airport. The City of Toronto opposed the plan, while Metro Toronto voted in favour. A compromise was reached in 1983 allowing only STOL type planes to use the airport with jets banned, and no runway expansion allowed.

In the 1990s, plans were revived to expand the airport, and Toronto City Council, now an amalgamated city government voted in favour of building a bridge, although the plan never progressed beyond a plan on paper. However in 1999, the Toronto Port Authority was formed, a new agency tasked with managing the airport and Toronto harbour. The agency took on a pro-airport expansion position and started pushing the airport expansion idea publicly. The agency expressed the opinion, backed by a 2001 consultant's study, that the airport could not survive as is, and had to expand or shut down. The TPA proposed the expansion of the airport for its economic benefit to the city.

Also during the 1990s, the city had taken an interest in waterfront revitalization, with several studies proposing the takeover of harbour and airport functions and the conversion of disused or under-used port lands for other uses. The consensus of revitalization studies was the removal of the Gardiner Expressway in the downtown area, greening of the lakefront and harbourfront, and a closure or reduction in the island airport.

Opposition to the island airport was formalized into the Community AIR (Airport Impact Review) volunteer association in 2001, headed by activist and former councillor Allan Sparrow. It was formed by local residents to oppose expansion on the grounds of increased air and noise pollution, safety concerns and that the increase in air traffic will hamper recent government initiatives to rejuvenate the Toronto waterfront. In July 2001, at a news conference held with representatives of the Sierra Club, the David Suzuki Foundation and the Toronto Environmental Alliance, the group proposed converting the 200 acres (81 ha) airport to parkland. Community Air's aims were and are supported by the City councillors of the area, including Adam Vaughan.

Even with the Community Air's support of the cancellation of the fixed-bridge to the Island Airport (as a result of the election of David Miller as mayor), the issue of a link to the mainland continued to be discussed.

In July 2010, a new proposal for a tunnel to the island was raised by the Toronto Port Authority. The revised designs for the tunnel specifically circumvented any need for local council approval. Community Air was not able to block the construction which began in the Summer of 2012. The tunnel replaced what critics called the shortest ferry crossing between the mainland and the island.

== Lawsuits ==
In 2006 the Toronto Port Authority launched a lawsuit against Community Air, claiming it had defamed individual board members and the agency.

On May 2, 2007, the lawsuit was dropped after Community Air issued an unconditional apology.

== Criticism ==
Critics of Community Air point out that the far distance of Toronto Pearson International from the downtown core makes it inconvenient for passengers in the latter, therefore the much shorter commute time to the Island Airport for those passengers would actually save time and pollution. The high-speed rail link between downtown and Pearson International, which then-mayor David Miller proposed as an alternative to expanding the Island Airport, itself took years to materialize since it faced opposition from residents along that route.

Critics note that Community Air has not targeted the increasing air traffic at suburban Toronto Pearson, with its proximity to lower-income communities such as Rexdale and Malton. In addition, Community Air has not criticized Pearson's expensive user and landing fees, which were raised substantially in 2003 with the opening of Pearson's Terminal 1-New, with the Greater Toronto Airport Authority expanding its monopoly over air travel in the Greater Toronto Area (as Hamilton International Airport was no longer viable as a reliever airport).

Porter's aircraft (Bombardier Q400s) are one of the quietest models to date (the Q standing for 'quiet') and critics claim the noise pollution incidents have not been as loud as what Community AIR claimed. The unions and airline industry suppliers have criticized Community Air for potentially hurting jobs.

Critics of Community Air have pointed out that the Gardiner Expressway, situated on the city's shoreline, contributes over 48,000 times more pollution than does the Island airport (Source: Report on Toronto's Waterfront).

== See also ==
- Billy Bishop Toronto City Airport
- Lisa Raitt
- Toronto Port Authority
- Toronto waterfront
