= 1995 Sioux Lookout mid-air collision =

Aviation accident in Ontario, Canada

Accident
- Date: 1 May 1995
- Summary: Mid-air collision
- Site: about 19 km (12 mi) northwest of Sioux Lookout, Ontario, Canada; 50°14′N 92°07′W
- Total fatalities: 8
- Total survivors: 0

First aircraft
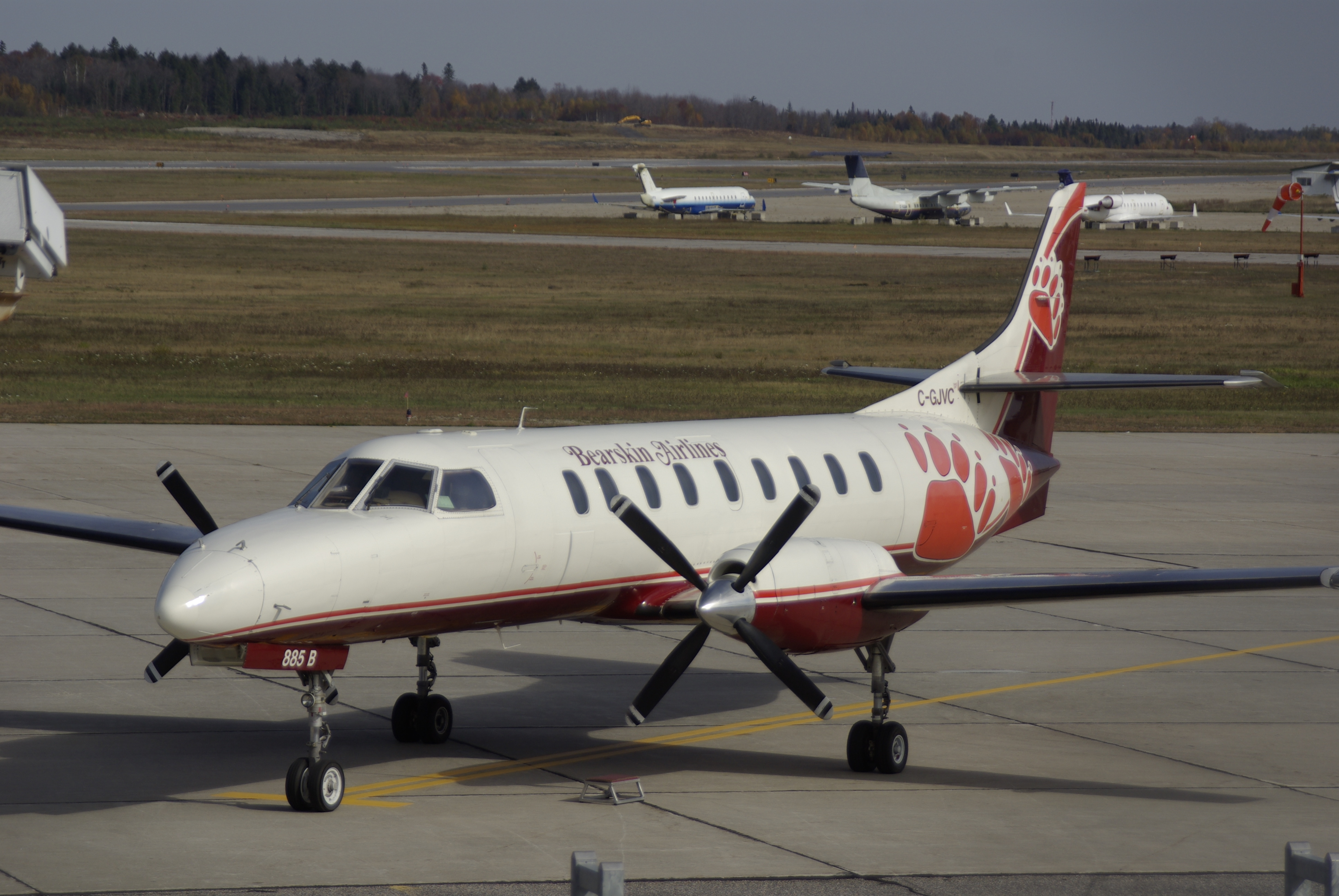
- A Bearskin Airlines Fairchild Metroliner similar to the accident aircraft
- Type: Fairchild SA227-DC Metro 23
- Name: Spirit of North Bay
- Operator: Bearskin Airlines
- IATA flight No.: YYB
- ICAO flight No.: CYYB
- Registration: C-GYYB
- Flight origin: Red Lake Airport, Red Lake, Ontario, Canada
- Destination: Sioux Lookout Airport, Sioux Lookout, Ontario, Canada
- Occupants: 3
- Passengers: 1
- Crew: 2
- Fatalities: 3
- Survivors: 0

Second aircraft
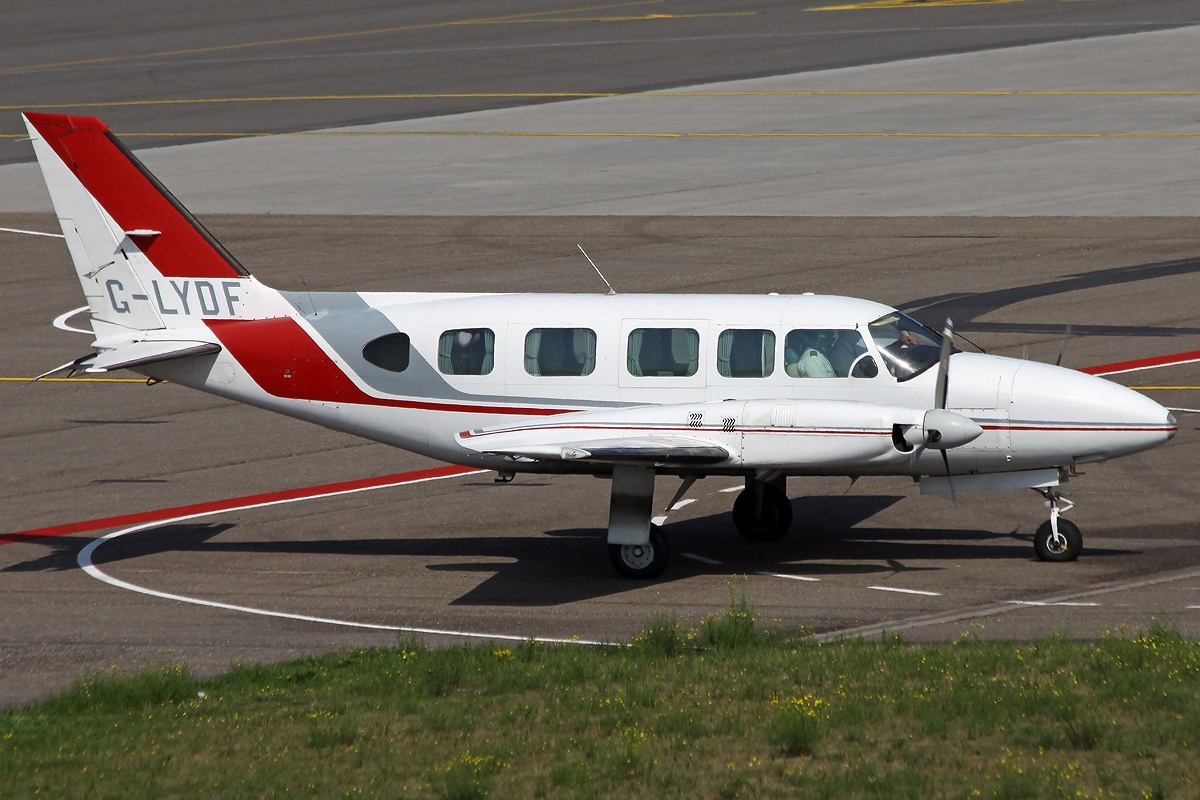
- A Piper PA-31 Navajo similar to the accident aircraft
- Type: Piper PA-31 Navajo
- Operator: Air Sandy Inc.
- IATA flight No.: YPZ
- ICAO flight No.: CYPZ
- Registration: C-GYPZ
- Flight origin: Sioux Lookout Airport, Sioux Lookout, Ontario, Canada
- Destination: Red Lake Airport, Red Lake, Ontario, Canada
- Occupants: 5
- Passengers: 4
- Crew: 1
- Fatalities: 5
- Survivors: 0

On 1 May 1995, Bearskin Airlines Flight 362, a Fairchild Metroliner, collided mid-air with Air Sandy Flight 3101, a Piper PA-31 Navajo, approximately 19 km (12 mi) northwest of the Sioux Lookout Airport killing all 8 on board both aircraft. Bearskin Flight 362 crashed into Lac Seul, and Air Sandy Flight 3101 crashed into the forest nearby. The crash was followed by a lengthy investigation from the Transport Safety Board of Canada which led to several changes to aviation in Canada.

== Aircraft ==
Bearskin Airlines Flight 362 was operated by a two year old Fairchild SA227-DC Metro 23 with a total of 3,200 hours of flight time. The plane was fitted with two Garrett TPE-331 engines with McCauley propellers.

Air Sandy Flight 3101 was operated by a 19 year old Piper PA-31-350 Navajo which had accumulated 6,784 hours of flight time. The plane had two Lycoming TIO-540 engines fitted with Hartzell propellers. Five days prior, on 26 April the plane's autopilot and transponders had been repaired and on 28 April the plane underwent a 100-hour inspection.

== Personnel ==
On board Air Sandy Flight 3101 was one captain and four passengers. The captain was 29 with a total flight time of 1,250 hours with 1,000 of those on the Piper Navajo. On board Bearskin Airlines Flight 362 was a captain, a first officer, and one passenger. The captain was 27 with 7,330 total flight hours, 580 of which were on the Fairchild Metroliner. The First Officer was 30 and had 2,810 total flight hours with 355 on the Fairchild Metroliner.

Sioux Lookout Airport had two flight service specialists, rather than an air traffic control. One of them was assigned to weather and the other was assigned to handling communications. The flight service specialist responsible for communications was 32 with 7 years experience and was 6 hours through his final 12 hour shift of a three-day on/off schedule.

== Accident ==
Bearskin Flight 362 left Red Lake Airport at 1:00 PM CDT en route to Sioux Lookout on an instrument flight rules flight. While approximately 55 km (34 mi) north of the Sioux Lookout Airport, the flight received clearance from Winnipeg Area Control Centre to begin an approach who advised the Sioux Lookout FSS (flight service station) of the incoming flight at 1:15 PM. Bearskin Flight 362 intentionally waited 70 seconds to contact the Sioux Lookout FSS in order to allow them to get out of the clouds and receive clearance to change to visual flight rules. During this time, Air Sandy Flight 3101, en route to Red Lake, took off from Sioux Lookout Airport and reported clear of the Sioux Lookout Control Zone. Bearskin Flight 362 finally made contact with FSS at 1:27 PM while 25 km (16 mi) away from the airport. Neither planes contacted FSS or ACC after this point. One minute later while giving an airport advisory about Bearskin Flight 362, the flight service specialist overhead an Emergency Locator Transmitter release a signal over the emergency frequencies. With both planes set on a collision course with a closing speed of 400 knots, at 1:28 roughly 3.5 seconds prior to impact, the pilot of Air Sandy Flight 3101 spotted Flight 362 and began a steep left turn in an effort to avoid it. However it was too late and the right wing of Air Sandy Flight 3101 made contact with the nose and right propeller of Bearskin Flight 362 at a 45º angle. As Flight 362's propeller splintered and the engine flew off, Air Sandy's right wing continued further into the other aircraft, and sliced off Flight 362's right wing, destroying itself in the process. The wings from both aircraft contained fuel cells which combusted upon impact leaving both planes on fire as they experienced an uncontrollable vertical descent into the ground.

== Aftermath ==
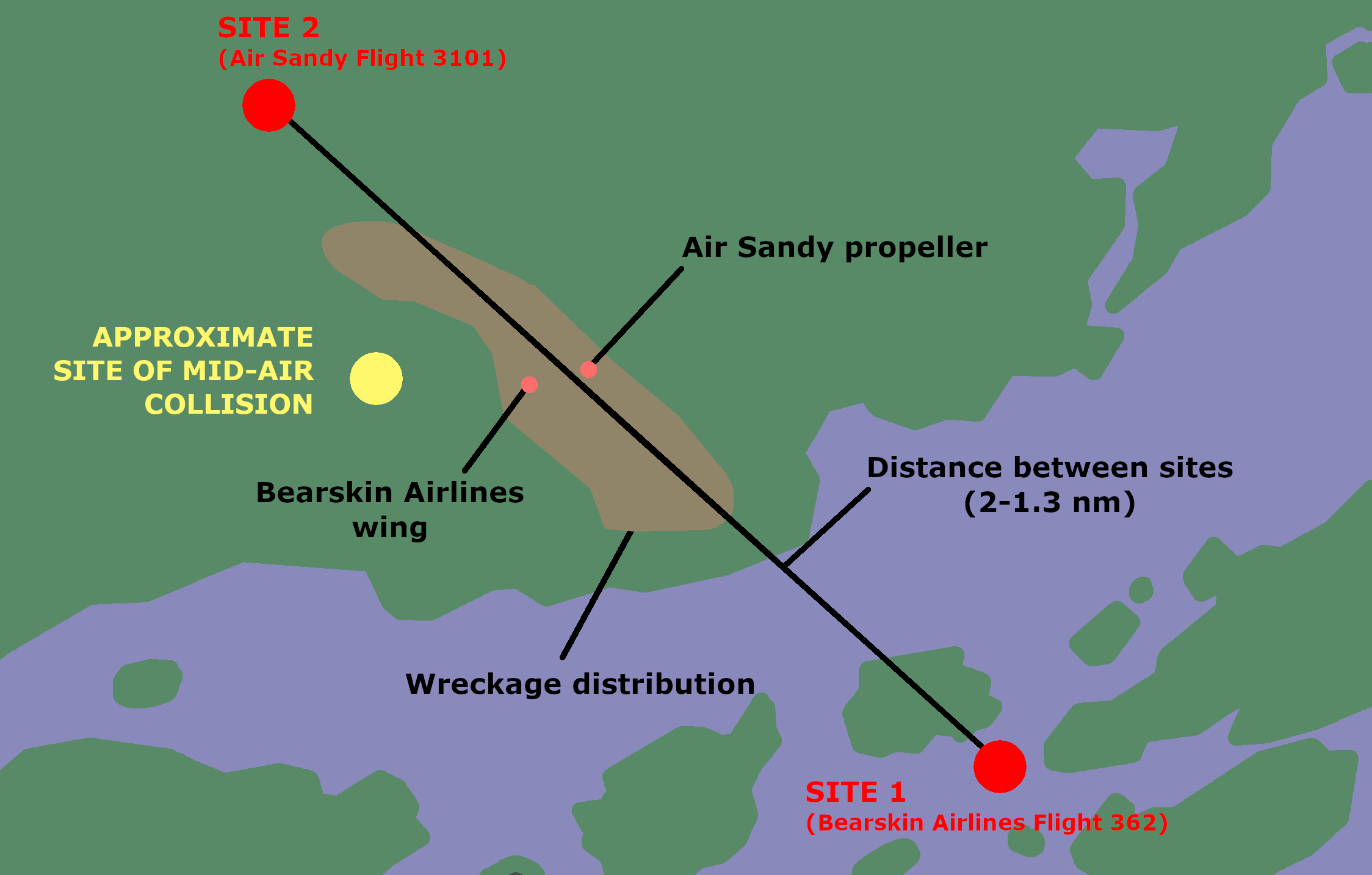
A labelled map of 1995 Sioux Lookout mid-air collision

After the accident, the pilot of Bearskin Airlines Flight 305, another plane in the area, contacted FSS and stated that he had just witnessed a bright flare in the sky which had fallen to the ground in flames. When attempts to contact either Air Sandy or Bearskin Airlines failed, a Search and Rescue aircraft from Trenton and an Ontario MNR helicopter were dispatched to search for the plane. Once arriving, the fire was confirmed to be the wreckage of Air Sandy Flight 3101, and an oil slick in Lac Seul reveal the location of the wreckage of Bearskin Airlines Flight 362 9 m (30 ft) underwater. A hydrophone was used to locate and retrieve Bearskin Airlines' flight data and cockpit voice recorders. Wreckage from the collision was found over a roughly 2.4 km (1.5 mi) by 0.8 km (0.50 mi) area. Initially only three onboard Air Sandy Flight 3101 were confirmed killed while two others on Air Sandy and the three on Bearskin Flight 362 were declared as missing. Eventually by the next day the bodies of all onboard both aircraft were found, leaving no survivors of the accident. Following the crash, it received heavy coverage from the local media in both Sioux Lookout and Thunder Bay.

== Causes ==
In the report done by the Transport Safety Board, the final conclusion of the causes contributing to the crash were “the fact that neither crew was directly alerted to the presence of the other aircraft by the Flight Service specialist or by onboard electronic equipment” and the reliance on GPS by pilots without taking into account inaccuracies in lateral precision. Since maintaining a listening watch over the radio is the pilots' responsibility, full blame for the crash cannot be placed on the flight service specialist. Adding to the difficulty of the flight specialist's job, the Sioux Lookout Airport did not have a radar screen, rather the flight specialist relied on a physical plotting board and position reports given by pilots over the radio to determine the rough location of aircraft.

== Changes ==
Following the accident, Bearskin Airlines required that all Bearskin Airlines aircraft be flown at a speed of less than 150 knots when operation within 5 nautical miles of the Sioux Lookout Airport. The new Canadian Aviation Regulations (which came into force in 1996) required that the pilot-in-command of an aircraft operating under Visual Flight Rules be required to call at least 5 minutes before entering the mandatory frequency area. A recommendation was given to Transport Canada to evaluate the use of more modern systems which display radar data in order to assist flight specialists in identifying and preventing future collisions. Another recommendation was given to develop a procedure for safe separation between aircraft using GPS. Both of these recommendations were agreed upon by Transport Canada.

== See also ==
- Bearskin Airlines Flight 311
- 2019 Alaska mid-air collision
