= Bearskin Airlines =

Canadian regional airline

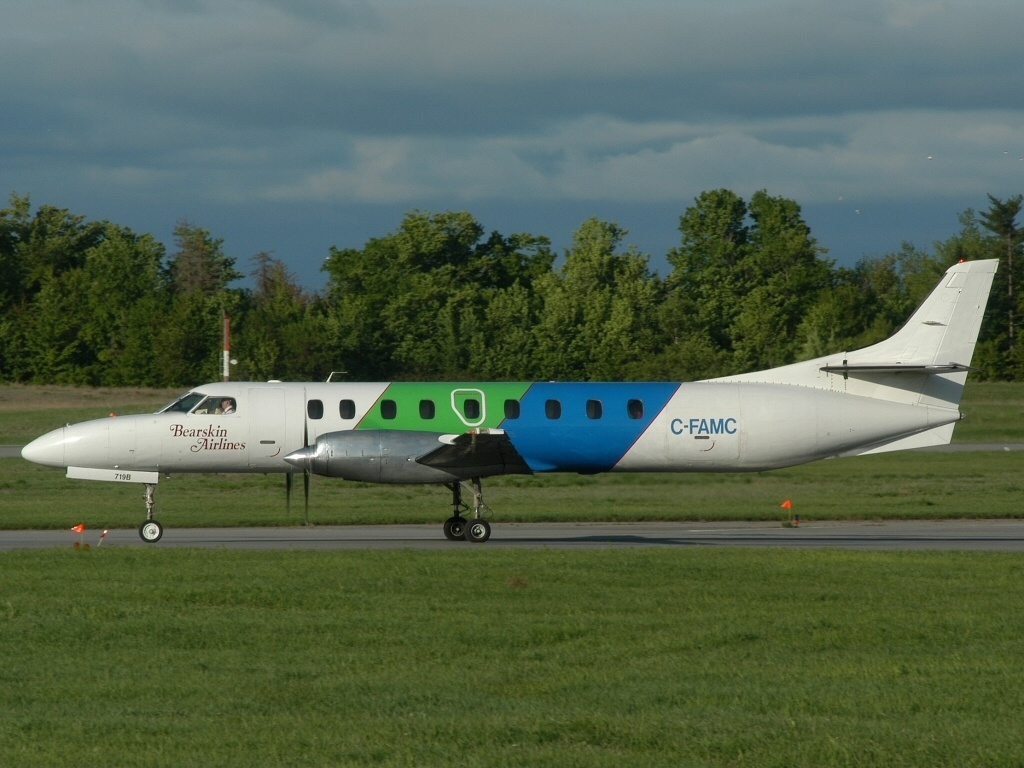
- Fairchild Swearingen Metroliner A227-AC
IATA	ICAO	Call sign
JV	BLS	BEARSKIN
- Founded: July 17, 1963; 63 years ago
- AOC #: Canada: 1861, United States: VEKF819I
- Hubs: Thunder Bay; Winnipeg
- Focus cities: Sudbury
- Frequent-flyer program: Connecting Rewards
- Fleet size: 22
- Destinations: 10
- Parent company: Exchange Income Corporation (Perimeter Aviation)
- Headquarters: Thunder Bay, Ontario
- Key people: John Hegland, founder
- Website: www.bearskinairlines.com

Bearskin Lake Air Service LP, operating as Bearskin Airlines, is a regional airline based in Thunder Bay, Ontario, Canada. It is a division of Perimeter Aviation and operates services in northern Ontario and Manitoba. Its main base is at Thunder Bay International Airport (YQT), with a hub at Greater Sudbury Airport (YSB).

== History ==
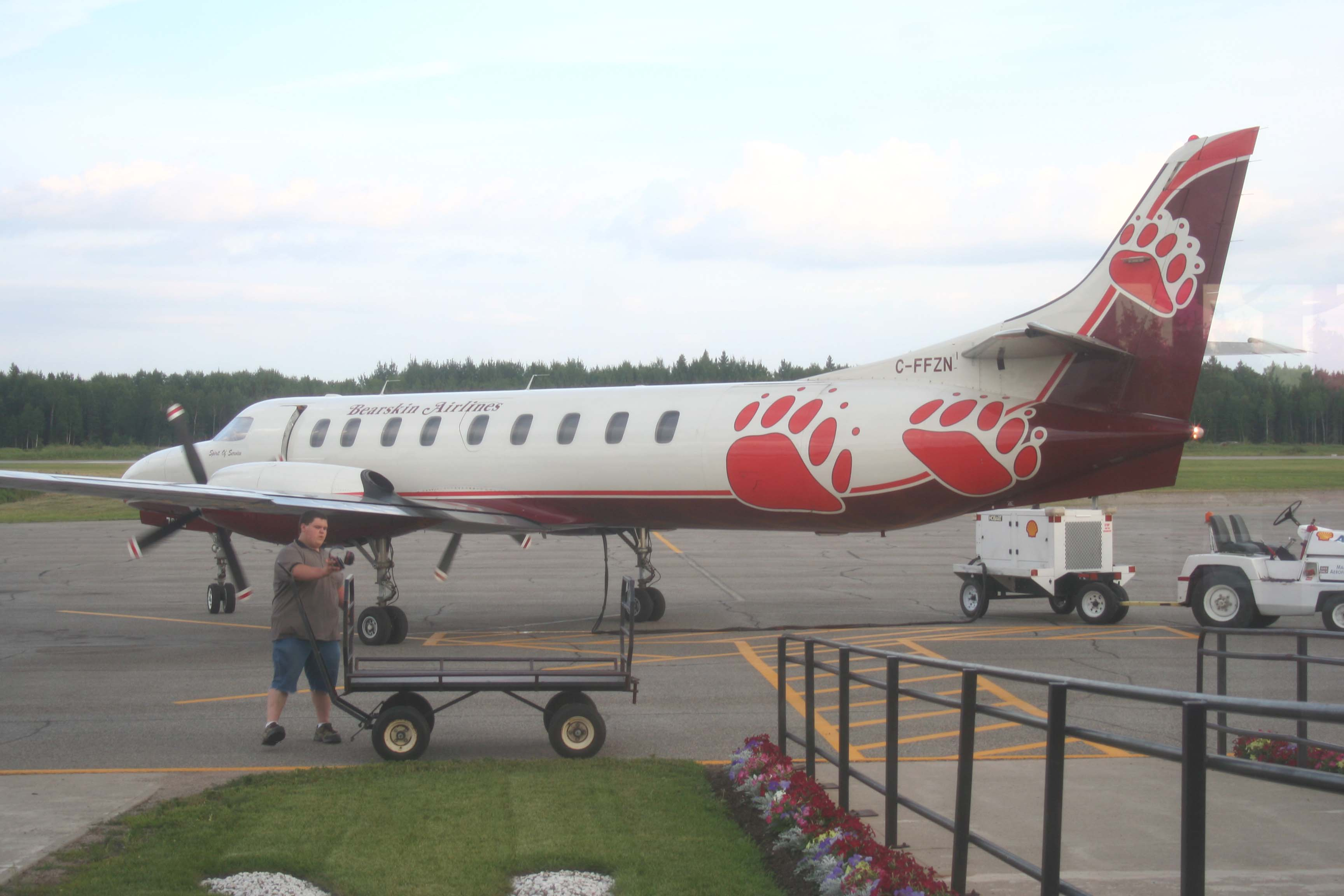
Bearskin Airlines' Metroliner

The airline was established in 1963 by bush pilot Otto John Hegland and began operations in July 1963 from its base at Big Trout Lake, home of the Kitchenuhmaykoosib Inninuwug First Nation. However, the airline was named after Bearskin Lake, home of the Bearskin Lake First Nation (where Hegland had a general store). It started by providing only charter services to the remote First Nations reserves in northern Ontario, using bush planes equipped with floats in the summer and skis in the winter. In 1977, it began its first regular scheduled flights between Big Trout Lake and Sioux Lookout.

From then on, other scheduled flights were progressively added, first to Thunder Bay, followed by Kenora and Winnipeg. This was also the period when the Government of Ontario began constructing new airfields that would make the northern communities accessible year-round. Therefore, in the late 1970s to the early 1980s, Bearskin made the transition of bush planes to wheeled commuter planes. It entered into a commercial agreement with Air Ontario and joined Aeroplan in fall 1988.

In the 1990s, Bearskin operated between Thunder Bay and Minneapolis–Saint Paul for almost three years. Following the collapse of NorOntair in 1996, Bearskin picked up over two-thirds of that carrier's routes, thereby adding scheduled service to all the major northern Ontario cities including Marathon, Timmins and Wawa. Three years later, it expanded operations to destinations in northern Manitoba.

In September 2001, Bearskin launched its route between Toronto-Buttonville and Ottawa with seven daily roundtrips on weekdays and three daily roundtrips on weekends. This was followed by Toronto-Buttonville and Sudbury route with three daily roundtrips in April 2003. In July 2003, it sold its routes and assets servicing northern First Nations communities to Wasaya Airways for $18 million. This marked a break from its bush flying background to focus on becoming a regional carrier. It withdrew its service between Toronto-Buttonville and Ottawa in August 2004 due to competition from major carriers. Sudbury received major connectivity improvement in April 2006. Bearskin launched a new route between Ottawa and Waterloo in October 2007.

It was owned by Harvey Friesen (president), Cliff Friesen (executive vice-president), Karl Friesen (vice president of operations), Rick Baratta (vice president of finance) and Brad Martin (director of operations). In 2010 it was sold to Exchange Income Corporation (EIC) for $32 million. EIC also owns Calm Air, Perimeter Aviation, PAL Airlines, Keewatin Air, and several other non-airline companies. Bearskin had 240 employees in 2007.

As of April 1, 2014, all service at Region of Waterloo Airport (YKF) and Ottawa Airport (YOW) was cancelled, affecting seven routes and significantly decreased the flight operations. The company indicated that a softening mining sector and high tech sectors (such as BlackBerry) were to blame for cutting the routes. Additional factors included the introduction of new competitors (such as Porter Airlines). The company indicated that it is refocusing on northwestern and northeastern routes in Northern Ontario.

Bearskin is a major provider of flights for Hope Air, a charity that organizes free non-emergency medical flights for people in financial need, particularly from remote communities.

== Destinations ==
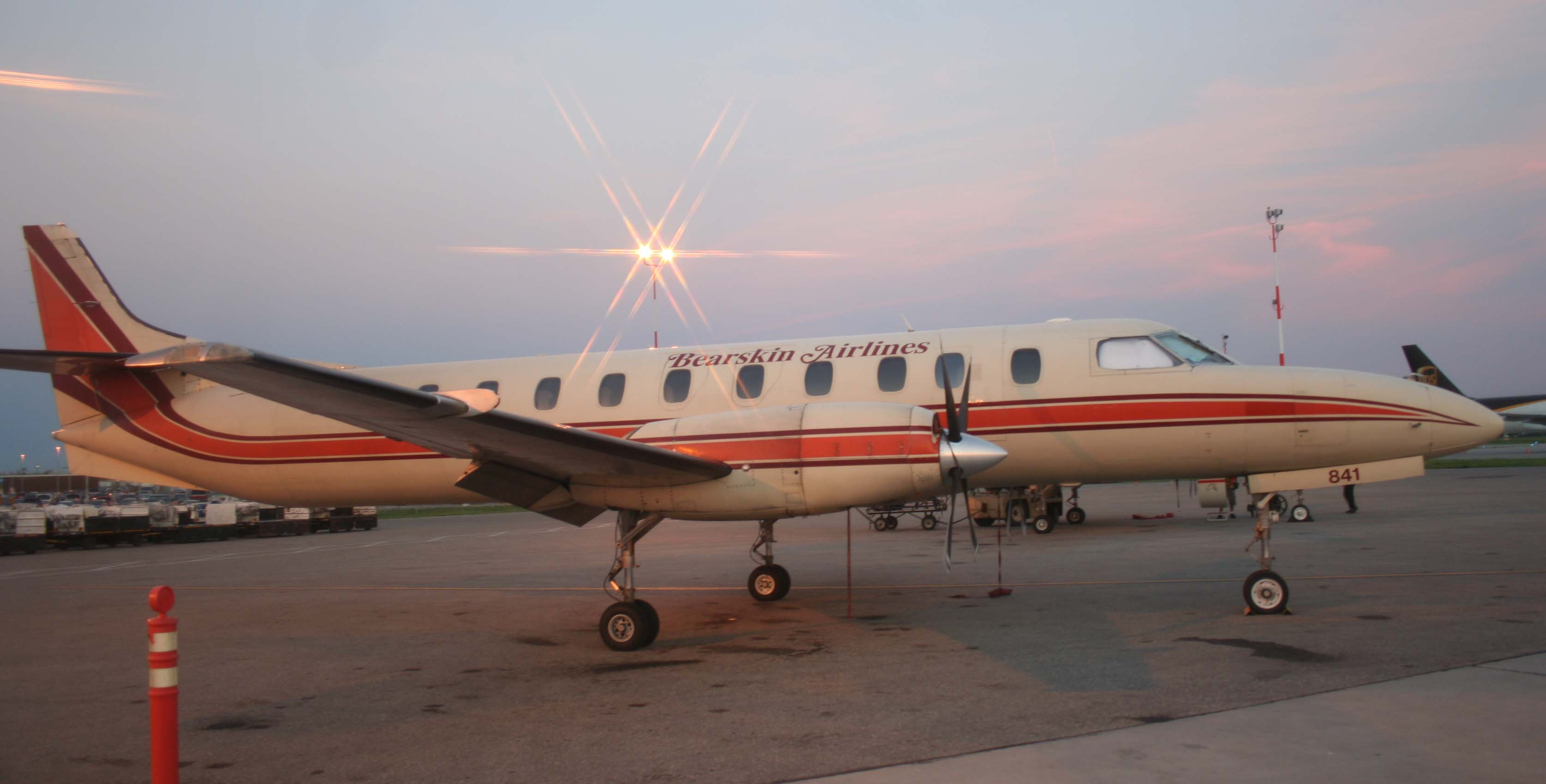
Bearskin Metroliner at dusk

Bearskin Airlines operates services to the following Canadian domestic scheduled destinations:

Province	City	IATA	ICAO	Airport	Notes
Ontario	Dryden	YHD	CYHD	Dryden Regional Airport	Cancelled
Ontario	Fort Frances	YAG	CYAG	Fort Frances Municipal Airport	Cancelled
Ontario	Kenora	YQK	CYQK	Kenora Airport	Cancelled
Ontario	North Bay	YYB	CYYB	North Bay/Jack Garland Airport	
Ontario	Red Lake	YRL	CYRL	Red Lake Airport	
Ontario	Sault Ste. Marie	YAM	CYAM	Sault Ste. Marie Airport	
Ontario	Sioux Lookout	YXL	CYXL	Sioux Lookout Airport	Hub
Ontario	Sudbury	YSB	CYSB	Sudbury Airport	Focus
Ontario	Thunder Bay	YQT	CYQT	Thunder Bay International Airport	Hub
Manitoba	Winnipeg	YWG	CYWG	Winnipeg James Armstrong Richardson International Airport	Hub

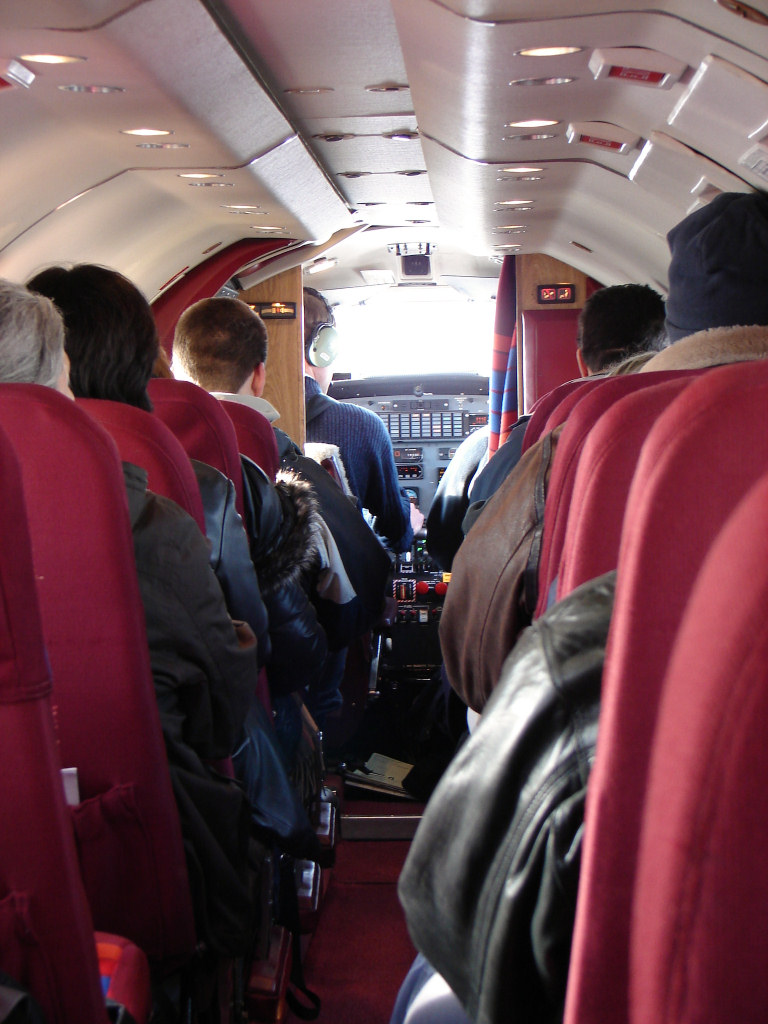
Bearskin Metroliner interior

=== Interline agreements ===
- Air Canada

== Fleet ==
As per the Bearskin Airlines website, the only aircraft they operate are Fairchild Swearingen Metroliners. As of 15 January 2026, Perimeter Aviation has 19 of the aircraft available:

Bearskin Airlines fleet
Aircraft	Number	Variants	Passengers	Notes
Fairchild Metro III	19	14 - SA227-AC; 2 - SA227-CC; 3 - SA227-DC	19	Up to 3,000 lb (1,400 kg) cargo

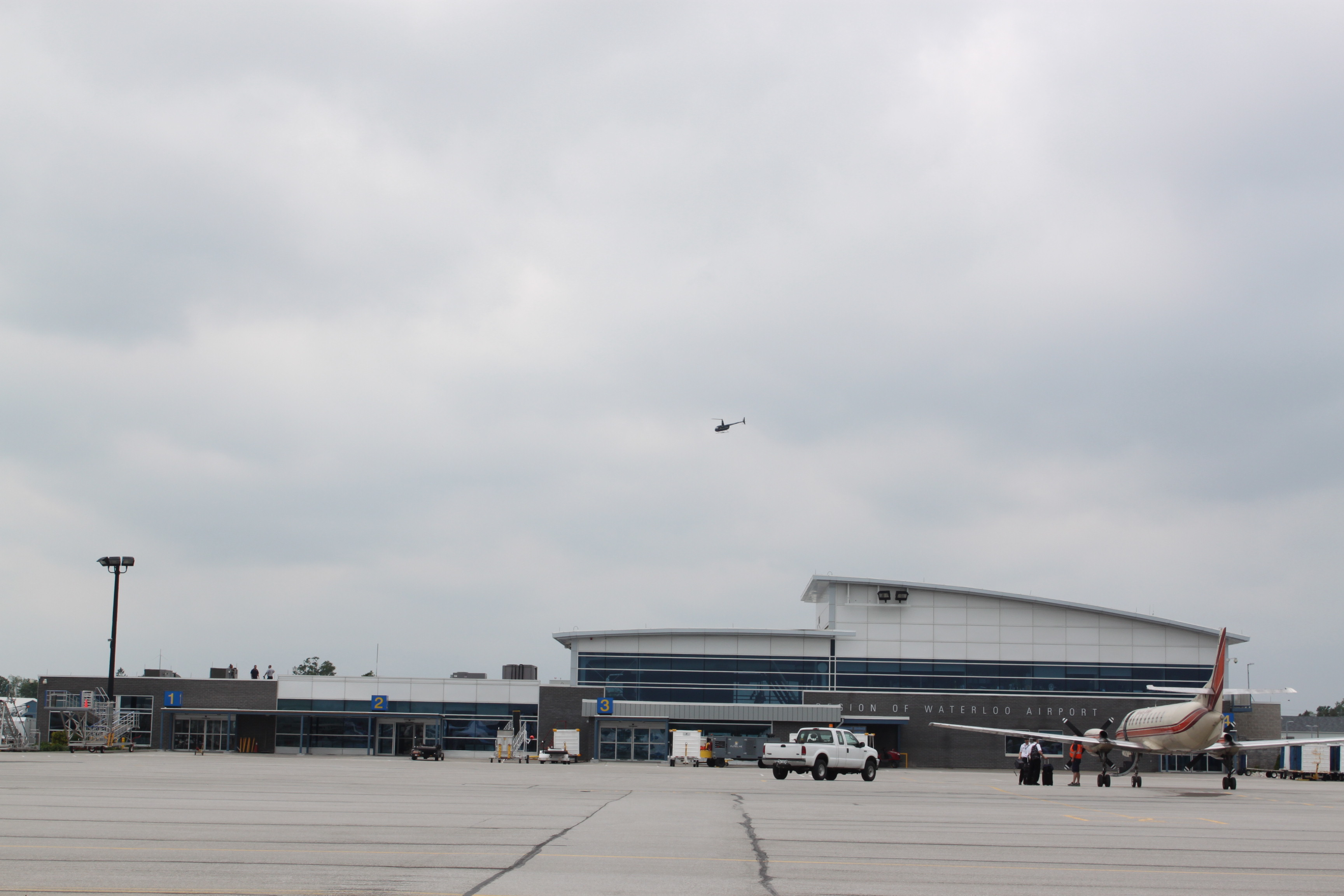
Bearskin Metroliner at Region of Waterloo International Airport

=== Previously operated ===
Bearskin Airlines has flown the following aircraft in the past:

- Beechcraft Model 18
- Beechcraft Model 99
- Beechcraft King Air 100
- Cessna 180 Skywagon
- Cessna 185 Skywagon
- de Havilland DHC-2 Beaver
- de Havilland DHC-3 Otter
- Noorduyn Norseman
- Pilatus PC-12
- Piper Aztec
- Piper Navajo and Navajo Chieftain
- Saab 340

== Affinity programs ==
Bearskin Airlines joined the Aeroplan when it entered into a commercial agreement with Air Ontario in fall 1988. It participated in the Aeroplan rewards program until June 30, 2018 (the airline merged with Perimeter Aviation on December 31, 2017). Since then, Bearskin Airlines is part of Perimeter Aviation's frequent flyer program, Connecting Rewards.

== Accidents and incidents ==
- May 1, 1995: Flight 362, a Swearingen Metroliner, collided with an Air Sandy Piper Navajo Chieftain while on approach to Sioux Lookout Airport, destroying both aircraft and killing all persons on both aircraft, a total of eight dead.
- December 4, 1997: Flight 310, a Beechcraft 99 hit the runway at Webequie Airport when it descended too quickly. No injuries were reported but the aircraft was written off.
- November 10, 2013: Bearskin Airlines Flight 311, a Swearingen Metroliner, crashed on approach into Red Lake Airport in Ontario after a flight from Sioux Lookout Airport, killing five of seven people aboard. The crash occurred south of the airfield where the aircraft struck trees and a power line before being destroyed by impact and fire. The Transportation Safety Board of Canada concluded that there was a total failure of the left engine about 500 ft (150 m) above ground due to an internal component. This slowed the aircraft and caused it to stall. This led Honeywell, the engine manufacturer, to issue a change to inspection procedures for fuel nozzles.
- On February 24, 2020 a Fairchild SA227-DC Metro 23 aircraft, operated by Perimeter Aviation as Bearskin Airlines Flight 344, crashed about 4:10 p.m. CT at Dryden airport in Ontario. Transportation Safety Board of Canada investigations found pilot error was the result due to an incomplete pre-taxi checklist. The aircraft left the runway while taxiing and crashed into a snowbank at speed with left propeller fragments penetrating the aircraft interior and injuring passengers. Multiple passengers were injured but there were no fatalities.
