= YRL =

YRL may refer to

- Red Lake Airport, a Canadian airport to the south of Ontario, with the IATA airport code YRL
- the Nheengatu language, spoken in Brazil, with language code YRL
- A US Navy hull classification symbol: Covered barge repair (YRL)
- Young Research Library, one of the major libraries at the University of California, Los Angeles, sometimes abbreviated as YRL
