= Bearskin Lake (Kenora District) =

Lake in Kenora District, Ontario, Canada

- Location in Ontario
- Location: Kenora District, Ontario
- Coordinates: 53°44′40″N 91°41′31″W
- Part of: Hudson Bay drainage basin
- Primary inflows: Morrison River
- Primary outflows: Morrison River
- Basin countries: Canada
- Max. length: 10.4 km (6.5 mi)
- Max. width: 5.2 km (3.2 mi)
- Surface elevation: 249 m (817 ft)

Bearskin Lake is a lake in Kenora District in northwestern Ontario, Canada. It is in the Hudson Bay drainage basin.

The main inflow is the Morrison River at the south. Two other unnamed inflows are at the south (east of the Morrison River) and southeast. The major outflow, at the north, is also the Morrison River, which flows via Sachigo Lake, the Sachigo River and the Severn River to Hudson Bay.

The lake was the original home of the Bearskin Lake First Nation until they were forced to move to Michikan Lake, 50 kilometres (31 mi) to the northeast, due to serious forest fires in 1932. A trading post of the Hudson's Bay Company and a post office located on the lake were also relocated to Michikan Lake, but retained the Bearskin Lake name.

== See also ==
- List of lakes in Ontario
