= Little Sachigo Lake =

- Location of Little Sachigo Lake in Ontario
- Location: Ontario, Canada
- Coordinates: 54°08′54″N 92°12′02″W
- Type: Lake
- Part of: Hudson Bay drainage basin
- Primary outflows: Sachigo River
- Max. length: 15 km (9.3 mi)
- Max. width: 13 km (8.1 mi)
- Surface elevation: 235 m (771 ft)

Little Sachigo Lake is a lake in Unorganized Kenora District in Northwestern Ontario, Canada. It is on the Sachigo River and is part of the Hudson Bay drainage basin.

The major inflow, from the south, and outflow, at the east, is the Sachigo River, which flows via the Severn River to Hudson Bay.

The closest settlement is the principal location of the Sachigo Lake First Nation, about 25 kilometres (16 mi) south and upstream on the Sachigo River.

== See also ==
- List of lakes in Ontario
