= CYRL =

CYRL, Cyrl or cyrl may refer to:

- Red Lake Airport, ICAO code
- Cyrillic script, ISO 15924 code
