= Sachigo Lake 1 =

- Indian reserve
- Sachigo Lake Indian Reserve No. 1
- Location within Ontario
- Coordinates: 53°52′N 92°12′W
- Country: Canada
- Province: Ontario
- District: Kenora
- First Nation: Sachigo Lake

Government
  - Chief: Titus Tait

Area
  - Land: 38.10 km^{2} (14.71 sq mi)

Population (2006)
  - Total: 450
  - Density: 11.8/km^{2} (31/sq mi)

Sachigo Lake 1 is a First Nations reserve in northwestern Ontario. It is the main reserve of the Sachigo Lake First Nation.
