= Sachigo Lake 2 =

- Indian reserve
- Sachigo Lake Indian Reserve No. 2
- Location within Ontario
- Coordinates: 53°58′N 92°30′W
- Country: Canada
- Province: Ontario
- District: Kenora
- First Nation: Sachigo Lake

Area
  - Land: 17.24 km^{2} (6.66 sq mi)

Sachigo Lake 2 is a First Nations reserve in Kenora District, Ontario. It is one of the reserves of the Sachigo Lake First Nation.
