= Michikan Lake =

Lake in Ontario, Canada

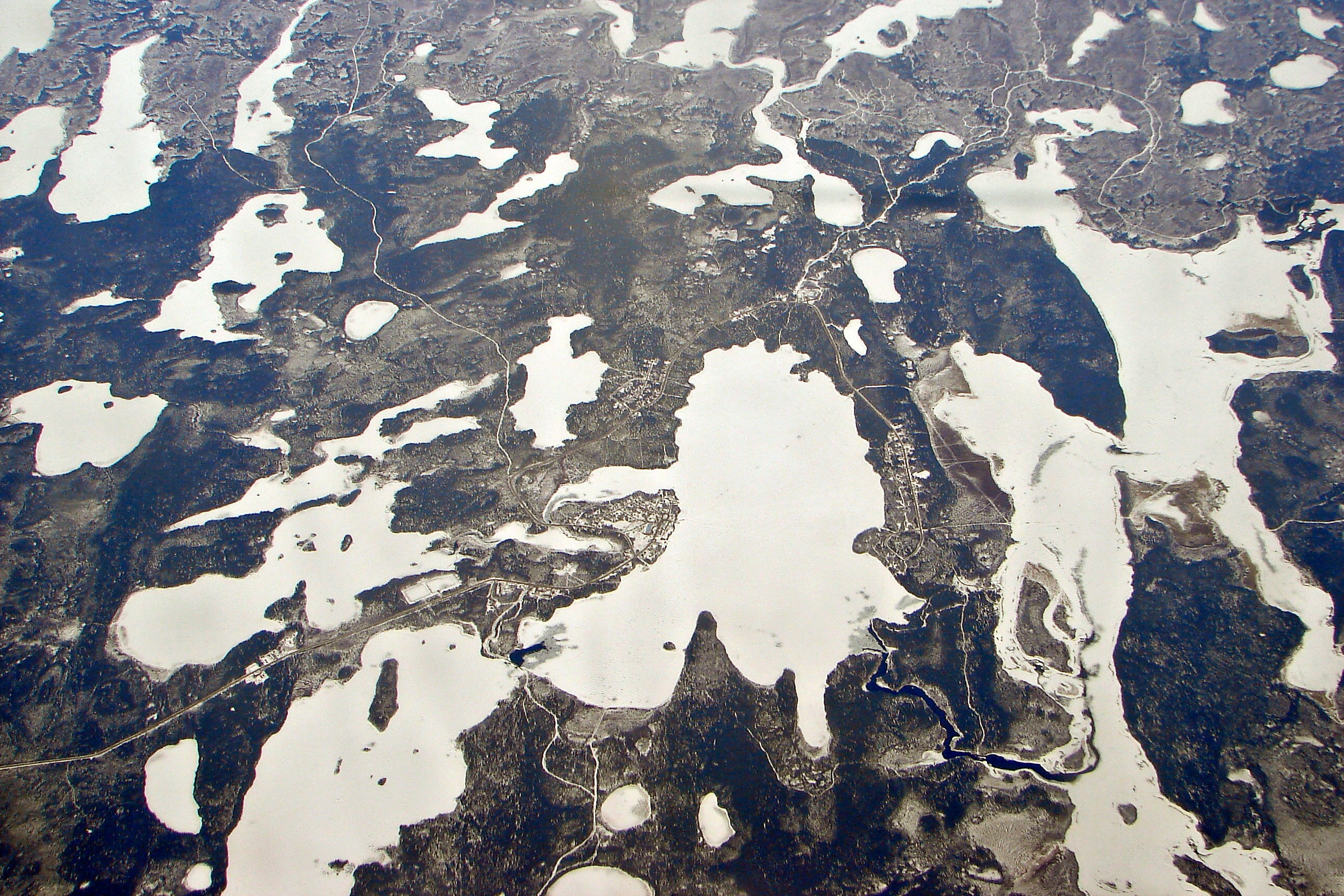

- Location in Ontario
- Location: Kenora District, Ontario
- Coordinates: 53°55′08″N 90°58′59″W
- Part of: Hudson Bay drainage basin
- Basin countries: Canada
- Max. length: 6.5 km (4.0 mi)
- Max. width: 2.5 km (1.6 mi)
- Surface elevation: 226 m (741 ft)

Michikan Lake is a lake in Kenora District in northwestern Ontario, Canada. It is in the Hudson Bay drainage basin.

The main inflow is an unnamed river at the west. A secondary inflow is an unnamed river at the north. The major outflow, at the southeast, is an unnamed channel to the Severn River, which flows to Hudson Bay.

The lake is the home of the Bearskin Lake First Nation main settlements, which were relocated from Bearskin Lake 50 kilometres (31 mi) to the southwest in the 1930s, and is partly encompassed by their Bearskin Lake Indian Reserve.

== See also ==
- Bearskin Lake First Nation
- List of lakes in Ontario
