= Bearskin Airlines Flight 311 =

2013 aviation accident in Canada

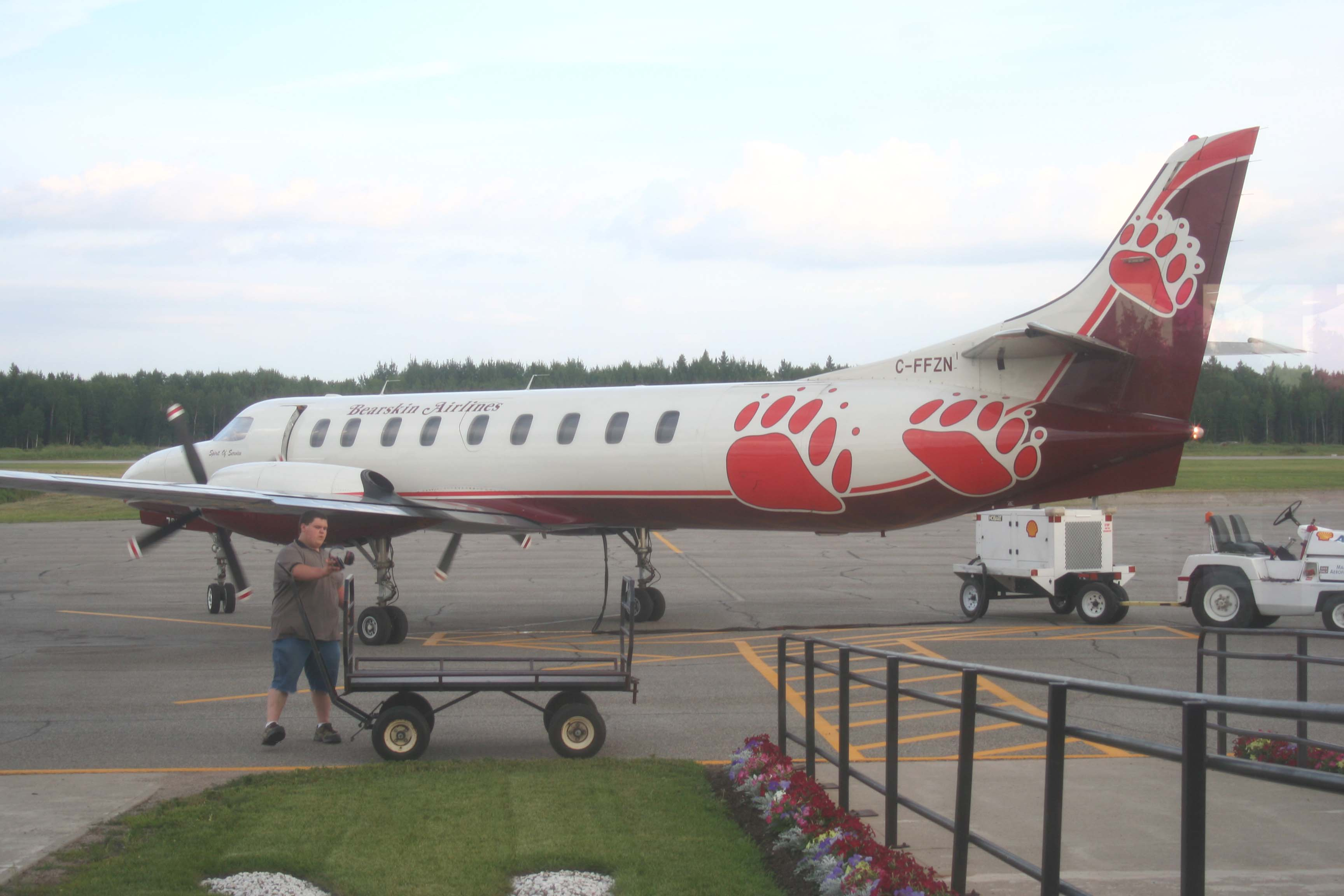
- C-FFZN, the aircraft involved in the accident

Accident
- Date: 10 November 2013
- Summary: Crashed on approach after engine failure
- Site: Near Red Lake Airport, Ontario, Canada; 51°03′41.9″N 93°47′09.6″W

Aircraft
- Aircraft type: Swearingen SA227-AC Metro III
- Operator: Bearskin Airlines
- IATA flight No.: JV311
- ICAO flight No.: BLS311
- Call sign: BEARSKIN 311
- Registration: C-FFZN
- Flight origin: Thunder Bay International Airport, Ontario, Canada
- 1st stopover: Sioux Lookout Airport, Ontario, Canada
- 2nd stopover: Red Lake Airport, Ontario, Canada
- Destination: Winnipeg Airport, Manitoba, Canada
- Occupants: 7
- Passengers: 5
- Crew: 2
- Fatalities: 5
- Injuries: 2
- Survivors: 2

On 10 November 2013, a Swearingen SA227-AC Metro III operating as Bearskin Airlines Flight 311, a regional flight in Ontario, Canada, from Sioux Lookout Airport to Red Lake Airport, crashed just 800 metres (2,625 ft) from the runway of its destination airport killing five of the seven people on board. The cause of the accident was determined to be an engine failure, exacerbated by errors made by the crew, who were unable to identify the issue.

== Background ==
=== Aircraft ===
The aircraft involved was a Swearingen SA227-AC Metro III, manufactured in 1991 and registered as C-FFZN, with serial number AC-785B.

=== Passengers and crew ===
On board the aircraft were two pilots and five passengers. The pilot in command was 34-year-old Captain Peter Traczuk, who accumulated a total of 5,150 flight hours, with 3,550 of those hours on this make and model. The pilot monitoring was 25-year-old First Officer Aniruddh Sawant, who had accumulated 2,200 flight hours, including 1,060 on this particular aircraft type. The five passengers were a 53-year-old woman, a 53-year-old man, a 64-year-old woman, which were among the fatalities along with the pilots and were all from Red Lake, the two survivors were a 29-year-old man and a 50-year-old woman both from Winnipeg.

== Flight ==
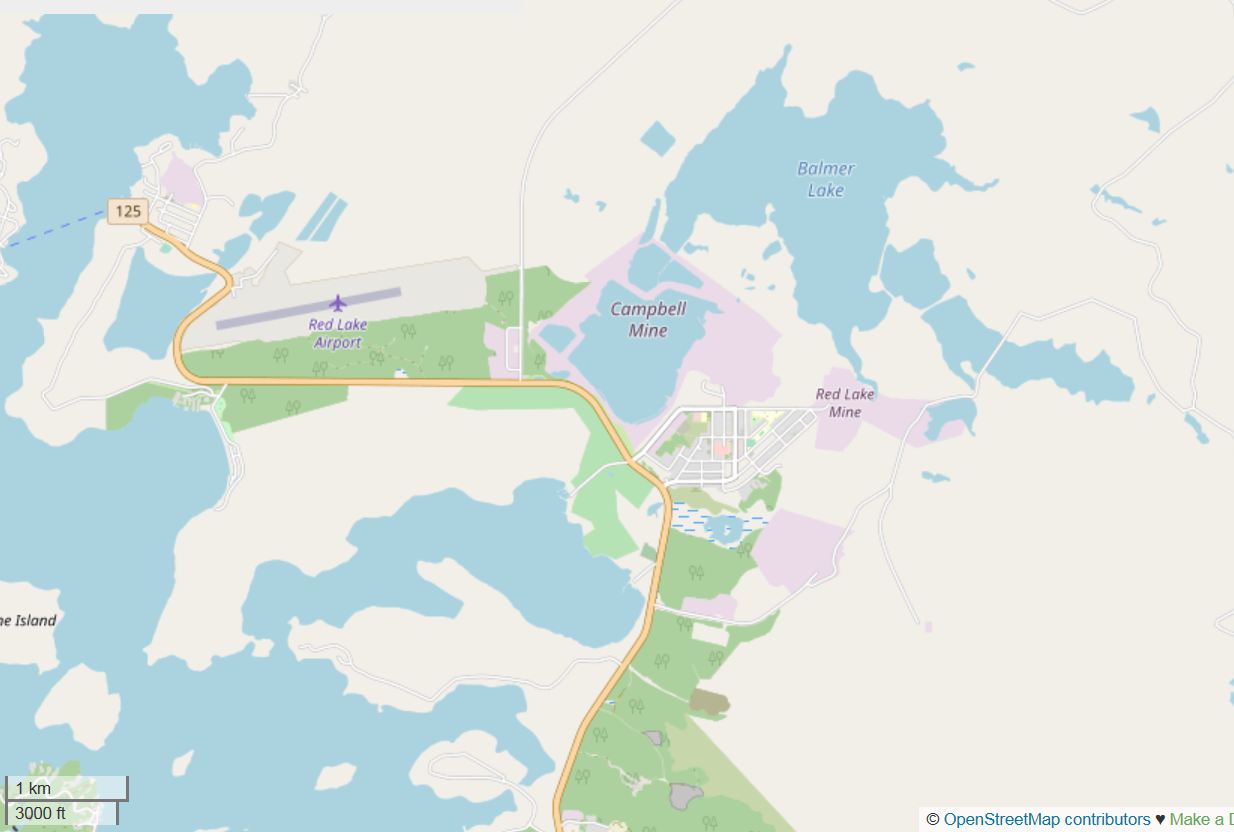
Map of the Red Lake Airport, in yellow the Ontario Highway 125 which passes just south of airport, where Flight 311 crashed

The aircraft was scheduled to fly from Thunder Bay, in Ontario, to Winnipeg, Manitoba with two stopovers in Sioux Lookout and Red Lake. The accident occurred on the Sioux Lookout-Red Lake leg of the flight. At 6:16 pm the aircraft was cleared to land on runway 26 at Red Lake, and at 6:27 the landing checklist was completed. Just one minute after the checklist, at about 500 feet (152 m) above the ground, the crew reported an issue, that would be later identified as a failure of a first-stage turbine wheel blade in the left engine, but they weren't able to identify it. The crew declared an emergency, maximum power was applied to the engines, and the landing gear was retracted. The aircraft then suddenly rolled to the left and struck trees and hydro lines with its wing. The aircraft crashed near Ontario Highway 125 and caught fire. Of the seven occupants both crew members died along with three passengers, of the two survivors one suffered serious injuries, the other minor injuries. The two survivors left the wreckage of the aircraft before it was totally engulfed in flames. The fire was extinguished shortly after the crash by a local fire crew.

== Investigation ==
The final report of the accident was published by the Transportation Safety Board of Canada one year and five months after the crash. The investigation found out that the engine failure was caused by a failure of a first-stage turbine wheel blade on the left engine, causing the aforementioned engine to suffer from a total loss of power. The crew's failure to identify the issue resulted in their inability to take the appropriate actions necessary to maintain control of the aircraft and perform a safe landing. The blade failure alongside the landing configuration of the aircraft resulted in it having a high drag and asymmetric state, so as the plane's speed reduced under the minimum control velocity the pilots lost control of the aircraft causing the crash. The recommendations that were issued were that the crew of Fairchild Swearingen Metroliners should pay attention to the aircraft's negative torque sensing system in case of an engine failure, in order to initiate an engine failure checklist in time, that borescope inspections and 450-hour fuel nozzle inspections should be done on this aircraft model to find in time eventual internal engine damage and to not re-install unserviceable fuel nozzles on this plane model.

== Aftermath ==
Shortly after the accident, Bearskin Airlines vice president declared that their biggest concern at the moment were the families of the deceased passengers and employees. On 11 November, the day following the crash, over 900 utilities in Red Lake remained without power due to the aircraft’s impact with hydro lines during the accident sequence.
