= Bearskin Lake First Nation =

Bearskin Lake
- Indian reserve
- Bearskin Lake Indian Reserve
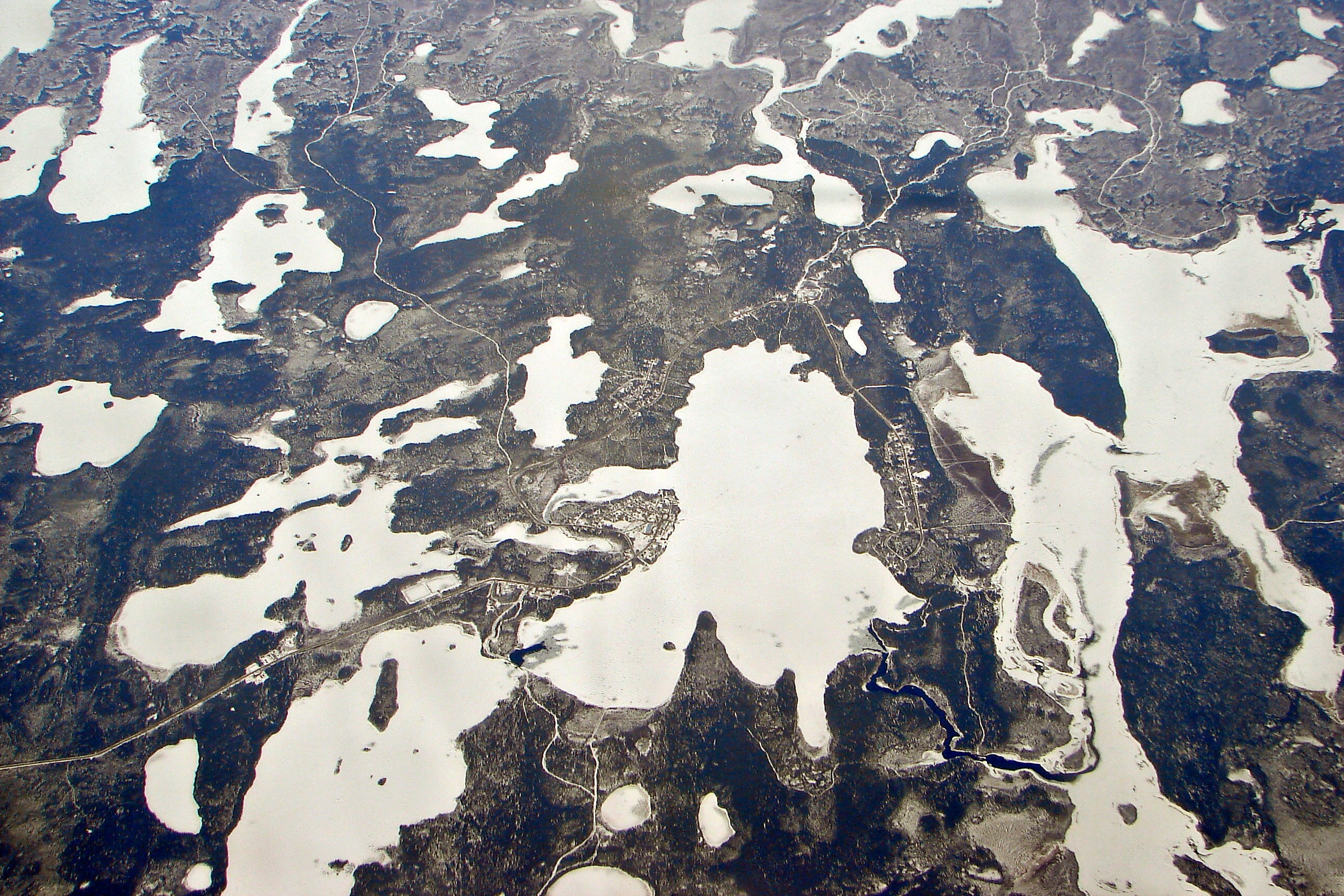
- Aerial view of Bearskin Lake reserve on Michikan Lake

- Location within Ontario
- Coordinates: 53°55′29″N 90°58′10″W
- Country: Canada
- Province: Ontario
- District: Kenora
- First Nation: Bearskin Lake

Area
  - Land: 144.93 km^{2} (55.96 sq mi)
- Elevation: 230 m (750 ft)

Population (2021)
  - Total: 447
  - Density: 3.1/km^{2} (8.0/sq mi)
- Time zone: UTC-6 (CST)
  - Summer (DST): UTC-5 (CDT)
- Postal code: P0V 1E0
- Area codes: 807
- Website: bearskinlake.firstnation.ca

Bearskin Lake First Nation (Severn Ojibwa: ᒥᒋᑲᐣ ᓴᑲᐦᐃᑲᐣ) is an Anisininew First Nation reserve in Kenora District, Ontario, Canada, located 425 kilometres (264 mi) north of Sioux Lookout. Bearskin First Nation's total registered population as of August 2026 is 1,007, of which their on-reserve population was 506.

Bearskin Lake First Nation is a member of the Windigo First Nations Council, a regional tribal council that is a member of the Nishnawbe Aski Nation.

The Bearskin Lake First Nation resides on the 12,626.3-hectare (31,200-acre) Bearskin Lake Indian Reserve, which is accessible only by air from Bearskin Lake Airport or winter road. Within the reserve, there are three settlements, all located on the shores of Michikan Lake (meaning "Fish Trap Lake"). The main village is situated on the west shore of the lake and all three settlements are linked to one another by all-weather gravel roads. The reserve also contains a segment of the Severn River, into which Michikan Lake drains, and of Severn Lake.

Bearskin Lake is policed by the Nishnawbe-Aski Police Service, an Aboriginal-based service.

== History ==
The Bearskin Lake First Nation was originally part of the Big Trout Lake Band, Anisininew living in the Hudson Bay lowlands. As such, they became signatories to Treaty 9 in 1929.

The nation resided around Bearskin Lake until 1932, when they were forced to move to Michikan Lake due to serious forest fires. A trading post of the Hudson's Bay Company and a post office located on Bearskin Lake were also relocated to Michikan Lake, but retained their former name for convenience.

The Hudson's Bay Company post became a full post in 1935, and operated an outpost at Sachigo Lake during the 1950s.

Prior to achieving full Band and reserve status in 1975, Bearskin was a satellite community of the Kitchenuhmaykoosib Inninuwug First Nation (Big Trout Lake First Nation), 72 kilometres (45 mi) to the east.

In 1959, the HBC Bearskin Lake Post became part of the HBC Northern Stores Department. HBC divested this department in 1987 to The North West Company, which still operates a Northern Store on the reserve.

The community has been affected by two long term water drinking and boiling advisories, one that started in 2006 and another that started in 2020. The Nation recently installed cisterns and a water treatment system that will help them lift the aforementioned water advisories.

In August 2023, the reserve was connected to the provincial electricity network, replacing reliance on diesel generators and expensive fuel shipments.

== Demographics ==
The Bearskin Lake First Nation has a registered population of 1007 members, of which 506 persons live on the Bearskin Lake Reserve (as of August 2026), 8 on other reserves, while 493 persons are off-reserve.

In the 2021 Census of Population conducted by Statistics Canada, the Bearskin Lake Indian Reserve had a population of 447 living in 126 of its 152 total private dwellings, a change of 25.9% from its 2016 population of 355. With a land area of 144.93 km^{2} (55.96 sq mi), it had a population density of 3.1/km^{2} (8.0/sq mi) in 2021.

Canada census – Bearskin Lake Indian Reserve community profile

| | 2021 | 2016 |
| Population | 447 (+25.9% from 2016) | 355 (% from 2011) |
| Land area | 144.93 km^{2} (55.96 sq mi) | 143.83 km^{2} (55.53 sq mi) |
| Population density | 3.1/km^{2} (8.0/sq mi) | 2.5/km^{2} (6.5/sq mi) |
| Median age | 27.0 (M: 27.0, F: 26.2) | 26.0 (M: 25.4, F: 27.0) |
| Private dwellings | 152 (total) 126 (occupied) | 140 (total) 109 (occupied) |
| Median household income | $42,800 | $43,803 |

References: 2021 2016

Historical census populations – Bearskin Lake Indian Reserve
| Year | Pop. | ±% |
|---|---|---|
| 1981 | 331 | — |
| 1991 | 344 | +3.9% |
| 1996 | 428 | +24.4% |
| 2001 | 363 | −15.2% |
| 2006 | 459 | +26.4% |
| 2016 | 355 | −22.7% |
| 2021 | 447 | +25.9% |
2011 data was incompletely enumerated (suppressed). Source: Statistics Canada

== Governance ==
Bearskin First Nation is governed by Chief Lefty Kamenawatamin, who serves alongside Deputy Chief Billy Kamenawatamin and Councillors Jennifer Fiddler, Robert Kamenawatamin, Wayne Brown, and Simon McKay.

Previous chiefs include Rosemary McKay who served from 2014-2017. McKay served alongside her Deputy Chief Leonard "Wayne" Brown, and Councillors Stuart Kamenawatamin, Gary Kamenawatamin, George Kamenawatamin, and Roderick Kamenawatamin.

Leon Marshall Beardy served as Chief from 2026-2026.
