= Morrison River =

- Location of the river mouth in Ontario

Location
- Country: Canada
- State: Ontario
- Region: Northwestern Ontario
- District: Kenora

Physical characteristics
- Source: Unnamed lake
  - coordinates: 53°29′24″N 91°47′43″W
  - elevation: 292 m (958 ft)
- Mouth: Sachigo Lake
  - coordinates: 53°46′38″N 91°51′01″W
  - elevation: 248 m (814 ft)

Basin features
- River system: Hudson Bay drainage basin

The Morrison River is a river in Kenora District in Northwestern Ontario, Canada. It is part of the Hudson Bay drainage basin.

The river begins at an unnamed lake and flows northeast, then northwest, and then north to Bearskin Lake. It then heads west to Sachigo Lake, and flows via the Sachigo River and the Severn River to Hudson Bay.
