= Superior Airways =

Canadian charter airline

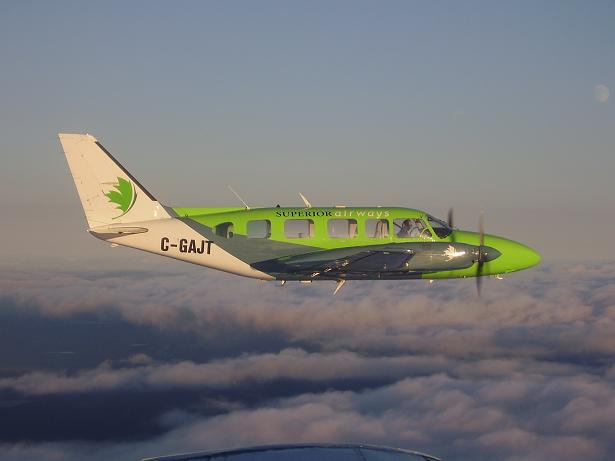
- A Piper PA-31 Navajo
IATA	CDD	Call sign
N/A	SR	SUPERIOR
- Founded: 2003
- AOC #: Canada: 14801; United States: UYXF120F
- Hubs: Red Lake Airport, Ontario
- Fleet size: 15
- Destinations: Canada / US
- Headquarters: Red Lake, Ontario, Canada
- Key people: Chris LeBlanc (CEO) Jason Green (President) Ryan McGuigan (Vice-President)
- Revenue: $10M +
- Total assets: $20M+
- Employees: 50
- Website: www.superiorairways.com

Superior Airways is a chartered air service based in Red Lake, Ontario, Canada at the Red Lake Airport in the town of Cochenour.

== History ==
Established in 2003, Superior Airways has been serving Northwestern Ontario by flying cargo, fisherman, hunters, firefighters, First Nations, medical patients and law enforcement to and from remote communities as well as city centers.

Superior Airways (SAL) began its operation in Sioux Lookout, Ontario with three employees, but due to market saturation relocated one of its aircraft to Red Lake, Ontario, in 2004. Both aircraft were relocated in Red Lake. SAL purchased its first turbine aircraft, a Cessna 208B, in 2008.

In 2012, shares of Superior Airways were sold to new private-ownership. Under new ownership, the company continued to grow. In 2013, Superior Airways was the first in Canada to operate the Quest Kodiak; at the time a brand new aircraft designed for off strip operations. It was however sold shortly thereafter, and another C208B was added to the fleet to continue standardization of the fleet. Within a few years, two additional Cessna C208 amphibious aircraft were also added to their growing fleet of turbine powered aircraft; creating a new float operations division, within the existing framework of the company. The company continued to grow this division through the acquisition of Green Airways float base and assets located on Howey Bay, Red Lake, Ontario. Further growth continued through acquisition of Chimo Air Service, in 2018, which also operated from Howey Bay. This acquisition, completed the amalgamation of historic float operators in Howey Bay, under one roof, Superior Airways Limited.

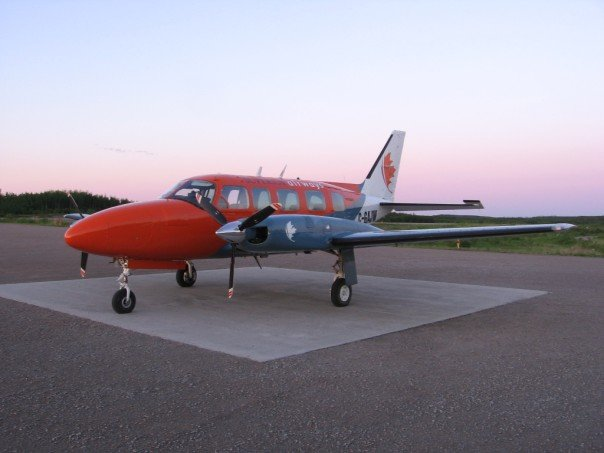
C-GAJW, a Piper PA-31 Navajo

== Fleet ==
As of September 2026, Superior Airways operate the following aircraft:

Superior Airways
Aircraft	Number	Variants	Notes
Beechcraft Super King Air 200	2		Introduced October 2023
Cessna 180	1	180B, 180C	
Cessna 182	1	R182	
Cessna 208 Caravan	5	(2) 208 Caravan, (3) 208B Grand Caravan	(2) Amphibious (2) Wheeled with TKS anti-icing
de Havilland Canada DHC-2 Beaver	1	Beaver I	
de Havilland Canada DHC-3 Otter	2	DHC-3-T Turbo-Otter	Superior Airways have two (2) DHC3T Otters on floats. One with a P&W PT6, the other a Walter GE turbine.
Piper PA-31 Navajo	1	PA-31-350 Chieftain	Only one listed on Superior website
