= Sachigo Lake 3 =

- Indian reserve
- Sachigo Lake Indian Reserve No. 3
- Location within Ontario
- Coordinates: 53°46′N 92°22′W
- Country: Canada
- Province: Ontario
- District: Kenora
- First Nation: Sachigo Lake

Area
  - Land: 28.33 km^{2} (10.94 sq mi)

Sachigo Lake 3 is a First Nations reserve in Kenora District, Ontario. It is one of the reserves of the Sachigo Lake First Nation.
