= Sachigo Lake =

- Location of Sachigo Lake in Ontario
- Location: Kenora, Ontario, Canada
- Coordinates: 53°48′28″N 92°04′55″W
- Type: Lake
- Part of: Hudson Bay drainage basin
- Primary outflows: Sachigo River
- Max. length: 32 km (20 mi)
- Max. width: 17 km (11 mi)
- Surface elevation: 248 m (814 ft)

Sachigo Lake is a lake in Unorganized Kenora District in Northwestern Ontario, Canada. It is on the Sachigo River and is part of the Hudson Bay drainage basin.

The major inflows are the Sachigo River at the southwest and the Morrison River at the east. The major outflow is the Sachigo River at the north, which flows via the Severn River to Hudson Bay.

The principal location of the Sachigo Lake First Nation is located on the northwest shore of the lake.

== See also ==
- List of lakes in Ontario
