= Severn Lake =

Lake in Ontario, Canada

- Location within Ontario
- Location: Ontario
- Coordinates: 53.932°N 90.775°W
- Basin countries: Canada

Severn Lake is a lake in northwestern Kenora District, Ontario, Canada.

== See also ==
- List of lakes in Ontario
