= Sachigo Lake First Nation =

- Location within Ontario
- Coordinates: 53°52′07″N 92°10′23″W
- Country: Canada
- Province: Ontario
- Region: Northwestern Ontario
- District: Kenora
- Part: Kenora, Unorganized

Government
  - Chief: Robert Beardy

Area
  - Total: 8,144.6 km^{2} (3,144.6 sq mi)
- Elevation: 255 m (837 ft)

Population (September 2011)
  - Total: 443
  - Density: 0.0544/km^{2} (0.141/sq mi)
- Time zone: UTC-6 (Central Time Zone)
  - Summer (DST): UTC-5 (Central Time Zone)
- Postal code: P0V 2P0
- Area code: 807

Sachigo Lake First Nation (Severn Ojibwa: ᓴᒋᑯ ᓴᑲᐦᐃᑲᐣ) is an Oji-Cree First Nation band government in Unorganized Kenora District in Northwestern Ontario, Canada. It is located on Sachigo Lake, part of the Sachigo River system and Hudson Bay drainage basin, approximately 425 kilometres (264 mi) north of the town of Sioux Lookout. As of September 2011, the First Nation had a registered population of 814 people, of which the on-reserve population was 443.

Sachigo Lake is policed by the Nishnawbe-Aski Police Service, an Aboriginal-based service.

== Governance ==
The First Nation elect their officials through a Custom Electoral System, consisting of a Chief and four councillors. The current Chief is Robert Beardy and the councillors elected for the same term are Shaun Tait, Eugene Tait, Michael Tait and Claude Mckay. Their two-year terms all began in April 2025.

As a signatory to Treaty 9, Sachigo Lake First Nation is a member of the Windigo First Nations Council, a Regional Chiefs Council, and Nishnawbe Aski Nation, a Tribal Political Organization that represents majority of First Nation governments in northern Canada.

== Reserve ==
The First Nation have reserved for themselves the 3,588-hectare (8,866-acre) Sachigo Lake 1 Indian Reserve, which serves as their main reserve, containing the community of Sachigo Lake. In addition, the First Nation have reserved the 1,723.6-hectare (4,259-acre) Sachigo Lake 2 Indian Reserve and the 2,833-hectare (7,000-acre) Sachigo Lake 3 Indian Reserve.

== Education ==
The new 2,381-square-metre (25,629 sq ft) Martin McKay Memorial School, offering Kindergarten through Grade 8 programming accommodates approximately 103 students. The new school contains a total of eight classrooms, a computer room, a public-school library, a gymnasium, multipurpose and change room facilities, as well as play areas for kindergarten and elementary students. INAC provided $9.45 million to Sachigo Lake First Nation, which managed design and construction of the school. Smith Carter Architects and Engineers Incorporated consulted extensively with the community and were winners of the Architectural Excellence for Design Awards, by the Ontario Association of Architects, for the Martin McKay Memorial School.

The concept, “Two Schools, One Spirit,” links the primary and secondary programs through the spirit of the Thunderbird. The primary and secondary schools are individual wings with two separate entrances, which allows for a division of students by age and maturity levels. Shared community use of facilities such as the gymnasium, multipurpose room and library, provides a central focus.

== Recreation ==
Over 1.1 million dollars has been invested in upgrades and the rehabilitation of the Sachigo Lake First Nation Arena. This new facility enriches the recreation for youth in the community and surrounding communities. Sachigo Lake First Nation also hosts an annual ice-fishing derby. This annual event, first started in 2013, is one of the largest ice-fishing derbies in Northwestern Ontario.

== Transportation ==
The community is served by Sachigo Lake Airport. It has winter road access south via Muskrat Dam Lake First Nation to the all-weather Northern Ontario Resource Trail and thereby to Ontario Highway 599.

== Economy ==
The unemployment rate in 2006 was 22.9%.
