= Sachigo River =

- Location of the mouth of the Sachigo River in Ontario

Location
- Country: Canada
- Province: Ontario
- Region: Northwestern Ontario
- District: Kenora

Physical characteristics
- Source: Broadside Lake
  - coordinates: 53°37′10″N 92°38′19″W
  - elevation: 272 m (892 ft)
- Mouth: Severn River
  - coordinates: 55°04′33″N 88°59′02″W
  - elevation: 75 m (246 ft)
- Length: 380 km (240 mi)
- Discharge
  - location: Sachigo River below Beaverstone River
  - average: 144.25 m^{3}/s (5,094 cu ft/s)
  - minimum: 104.70 m^{3}/s (3,697 cu ft/s)
  - maximum: 191.53 m^{3}/s (6,764 cu ft/s)

Basin features
- River system: Hudson Bay drainage basin
- Tributaries
  - left: Beaver Stone River, Thorne River, Sherman River
  - right: Wapaseese River, Morrison River, Rottenfish River

The Sachigo River is a river in the Hudson Bay drainage basin in Kenora District in Northwestern Ontario, Canada. It is a tributary of the Severn River.

== Course ==
The Sachigo River begins at Broadside Lake and flows northeast through Pasateko Lake, past the Sachigo Hills, to Sachigo Lake, the location of the Sachigo Lake First Nation and the Sachigo Lake Airport, and where it takes in the right tributary Morrison River. It then heads north, past the Wetiko Hills, to Little Sachigo Lake, exits the lake east and heads once again northeast. The river divides into two branches, takes in the Sherman River on the left branch, then recombines. It continues northeast to reach its mouth at the Severn River, which flows to Hudson Bay.

== Tributaries ==
- Beaver Stone River (left)
- Wapaseese River (right)
- Thorne River (left)
- Sherman River (left)
- Sachigo Lake
  - Morrison River (right)
- Rottenfish River (right)

== See also ==
- List of rivers of Ontario

== Sources ==
- "Sachigo River". Geographical Names Data Base. Natural Resources Canada.
- "Sachigo River". Atlas of Canada. Natural Resources Canada. 2010-02-04. Shows the river course.
