= Red Lake Airport =

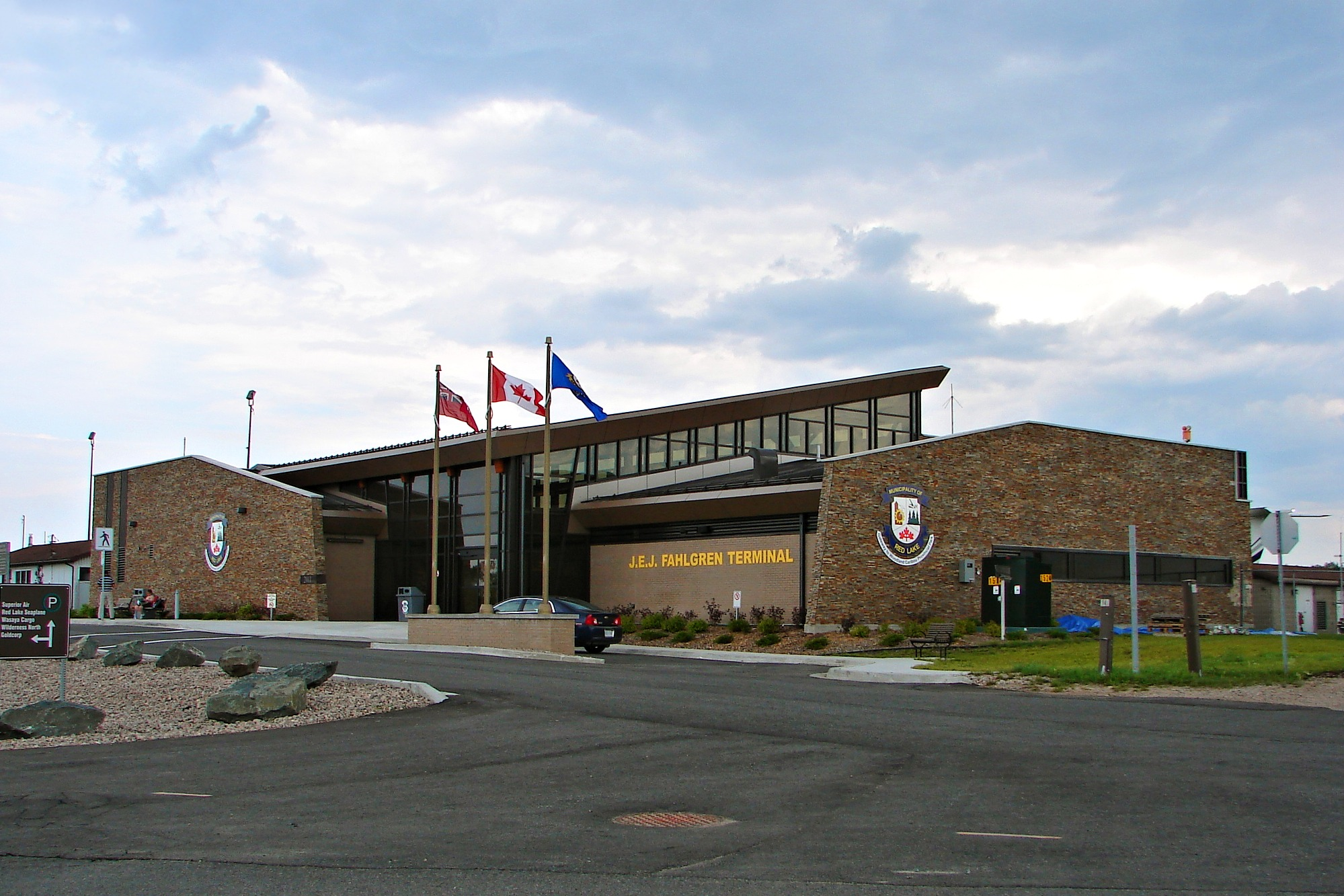
- IATA: YRL; ICAO: CYRL; WMO: 71854

Summary
- Airport type: Public
- Owner: The Corporation of the Municipality of Red Lake
- Operator: Municipality of Red Lake / Thunder Bay Airport Services Inc
- Serves: Red Lake, Ontario
- Location: Cochenour
- Time zone: CST (UTC−06:00)
  - Summer (DST): CDT (UTC−05:00)
- Elevation AMSL: 1,266 ft (386 m)
- Coordinates: 51°03′54″N 093°47′41″W
- Website: http://redlake.ca/web/airport.php

Map
- Location in Ontario

Runways
| Direction | Length | | Surface |
| Direction | ft | m | Surface |
|---|---|---|---|
| 08/26 | 5,001 | 1,524 | Asphalt |

Statistics (2010)
- Aircraft movements: 25,094
- Sources: Canada Flight Supplement; Red Lake Airport; Environment Canada; Movements from Statistics Canada

Red Lake Airport (IATA: YRL, ICAO: CYRL) is located 3 nautical miles (5.6 km; 3.5 mi) north of Red Lake, Ontario, Canada.

Red Lake Airport is located 1 km (0.62 mi) south of the community of Cochenour. The airport serves as a point of call for air carriers offering scheduled passenger service, and an operating base for Ontario Ministry of Natural Resources. It services both private and commercial fixed-wing aircraft and helicopter operators located on site.

== History ==
Commercial air service to the area began in 1926 using the waters of Howey Bay on Red Lake as a float and sea plane base. Due to the freight requirements of the gold mines developing in the area, Howey Bay was recognized as the busiest airport in the world during 1936 and 1937.

Construction of a 4,000 ft × 150 ft (1,219 m × 46 m) gravel runway began in 1946 and was put into use of May 29, 1947 when Canadian Pacific Air Lines began daily service from Winnipeg.

The airport operated privately until 1959 when the Department of Transport took over and lighting was installed. In 1996, the Township of Golden became the owner/operator of the Red Lake Airport. In 1998, the Township of Golden and Red Lake along with the Local Services Board of Madsen amalgamated to form the Municipality of Red Lake.

In 1993, the paved runway was extended to 5,000 ft × 150 ft (1,524 m × 46 m) to help serve the future growth of the Red Lake area.

In October 2011, a new airport terminal opened, replacing a small terminal building from the 1980s. On June 22, 2012, the airport terminal was officially named J.E.J. Fahlgren Terminal after a local mine manager and community leader.

Those leaving or arriving in Red Lake now enter a building that has a large ticket and rental car counters, luggage carousels, naturally lit seating areas, Nav Canada offices and space for administration. A modern parking lot has been implemented and a rental space is available for franchises inside the airport terminal building.

== Airlines and destinations ==
| Airlines | Destinations |
|---|---|
| Bearskin Airlines | Sioux Lookout, Thunder Bay, Winnipeg |
| North Star Air | Deer Lake, North Spirit Lake, Pikangikum, Poplar Hill |
| Superior Airways | Charter: Thunder Bay, Winnipeg |
| Wasaya Airways | Sioux Lookout |

== See also ==
- Red Lake Water Aerodrome
