= List of steamships of Denmark =

This is a list of Danish steamships, entering service in Denmark from 1819 onwards. The list is based on the three volumes of Danish steamship history by Holger Munchaus Petersen, Danske dampskibe indtil 1870, following the chronology of his list in volume III. As the duchies of Schleswig and Duchy of Holstein were part of the Danish realm until 1864, the list also includes steamships serving there.

== Ships ==
The year shown in the list is the year of entering service in Denmark. Some ships served in other countries before that, primarily the United Kingdom.

Year	Name	Builder	Tonnage	Description	Illustration
1819	Caledonia	John Wood & Co, Port Glasgow	101	Paddle steamer, built for the Caledonia Steam Boat Co and launched April 27, 1815. Bought by James Watt junior in April 1817 and fitted with new engines from Boulton and Watt, where he was a partner. In May 1819, she was bought by the Danish advocate (and later diplomat) Steen Andersen Bille (1781-1860), who had obtained a royal concession for transport of mail and passengers between Copenhagen and Kiel. In 1822 she was sold to Lauritz Nicolai Hvidt - also of Copenhagen - and the ship was broken up there in 1841.	
1824	Prindsesse Wilhelmine	Richard Pearson & Co, Thorne	120	Paddle steamer, originally named the Kingston and built in 1821 for the Hull Steam Packet Company, which was formed by investors from Thorne, including the builder, Pearson. She operated on the Hull-London route until 1823, when a larger ship took over. She was then used between Hull and Antwerpen until March 8, 1824, when she was bought by the Danish merchant Frederik August Hagen for £5,000. In Denmark she operated on the route between Copenhagen, Travemünde and Lübeck as well as doing pleasure cruises on the Sound. On November 25, 1833, she was sold to Øresunds Toldkammers Fattigkasse in Elsinore. Got new engines in 1838, but in 1844 the engines were removed for use in the Hertha. The hull was sold to Jens Steffen Kaas of Copenhagen, who rebuilt her as a three-mastet schooner, named Hydra. She was wrecked in March 1870, but refloated and sold to Swedish owners on October 25, 1870. Registered to L. Cramér of Rone, Gotland as the Maria Karolina in 1871–1877.	
1824	Kiel	Thomas Brockleby, Deptford	161	Built by Thomas Brocklebank in Deptford as the Eagle in 1820, and the following year she became part of the fleet of the General Steam Navigation Co., serving between London and Margate. In 1824 she was sold to the Danish Navy, arriving in Copenhagen on June 4, 1824. She was intended for the personal use of King Frederik VI - renamed the Kiel - but was also used on occasion as a ferry across the Great Belt and Little Belt, relieving the normal ferries. In 1844 she was lent to the harbour commission of Glückstadt, and when that part of Denmark rebelled in 1848, she became part of the navy of Schleswig-Holsten. After the first Schleswig War she was handed back to the Danish Navy, arriving in Copenhagen August 12, 1851. Was put up for sale in 1851 and 1852, but not sold and instead her engines were taken out and she was remeasured as a sailing ship in 1853. Sold to private owners in Aalborg in 1865 and renamed Frederik 6's Minde. Served on until 1897, when she was reported as broken up.	
1825	Jylland	John Bowlt, Gateshead.	22	A small steamer built in 1823 as the Dandy. Sold to Opfeldt of Denmark in 1825, renamed to Jylland and employed on a route between Copenhagen and Aarhus. Opfeldt apparently ran out of funds in 1826 and the ship went to the Elbe based in Altona. By 1843 it was still there, owned by H. P. Ohlsen and having its original name Dandy. By 1845 the vessel was no longer in the list of Danish ships.	
1827	Dania	Sime & Rankine, Leith	78	Built in 1823 as the Quentin Durward for R. Ogilvie and G. Crichton of Leith. Bought in 1827 by Laurits Christensen and registered in Copenhagen as the Dania. Employed on routes between Copenhagen and ports in Jutland until 1836. From 1836 to 1839 she was used on the route between Kalundborg and Aarhus. Broken up in 1840.	
1828	Mercurius	George Graham, Harwich	54	Built as the first steamship for service with the Royal Danish Mail and employed on the Great Belt. Replaced by a new ship in 1844 and then used for miscellaneous tasks. In 1856 sold to Joseph Owen & Sønner (Sons) of Copenhagen, and in 1864 to Oscar Petersen of Kastrup, who gave her the name Robert. Broken up after 1867.	
1830	Frederik den Sjette	Jacob Holm, Christianshavn, Copenhagen	150	Ordered by the merchant Lauritz Nicolai Hvidt as replacement for the Caledonia. The first steamship built in Denmark - with the engine as a notable exception, being delivered from England. Chartered to the Royal Danish mail in 1844, for the route to Stettin. Sold in 1845 to the merchant A. Fibiger and employed on the service between Copenhagen and Flensburg. Ran aground in the autumn and was destroyed by a storm.	
