= PS Mercurius =

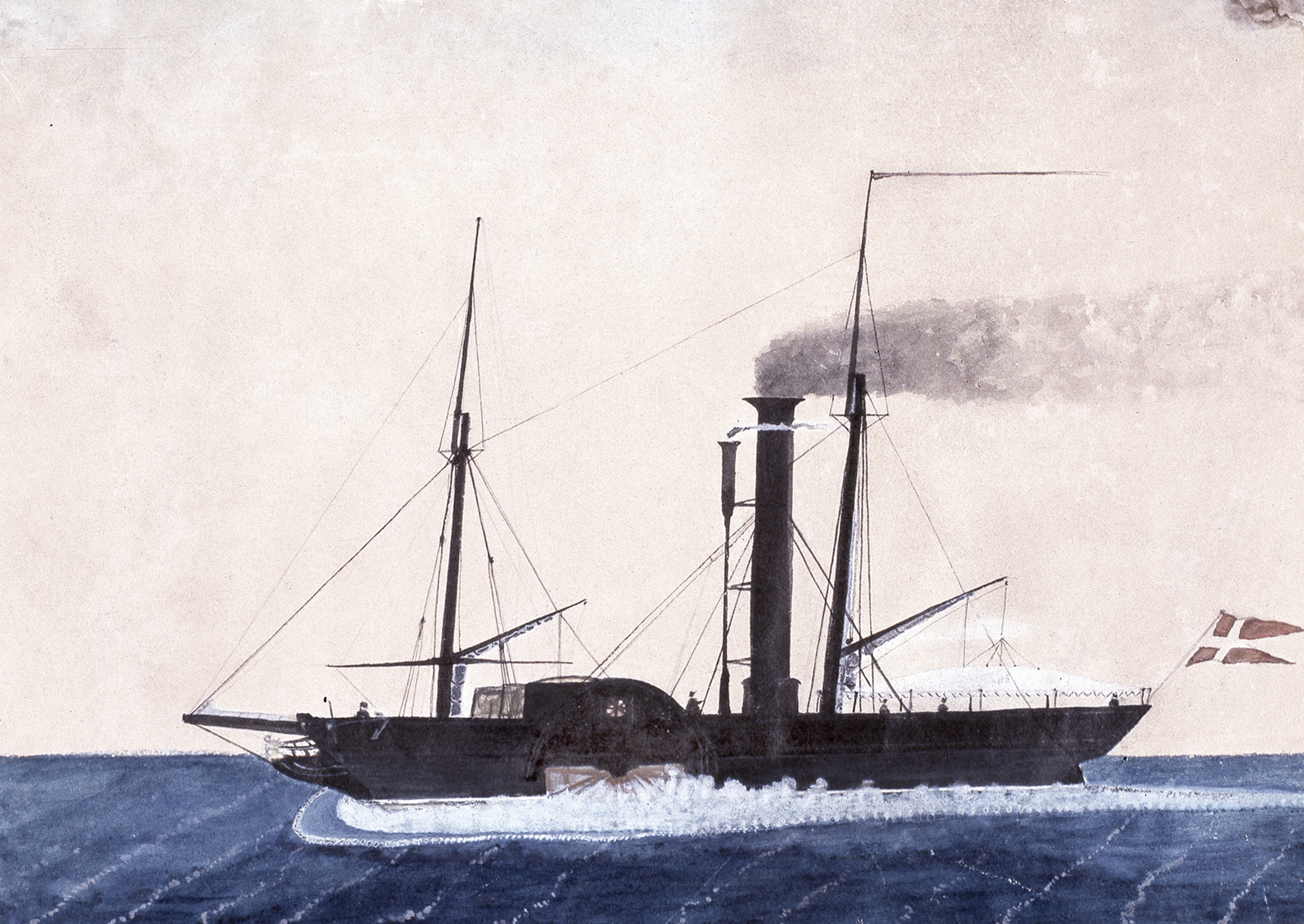
- Unknown artist: Mercurius at full speed.

History
- Name: Mercurius; Robert
- Owner: 1828: Royal Danish Mail Service.; 1856: Joseph Owen & Sønner, Copenhagen.; 1864: Oscar Petersen, Kastrup.
- Port of registry: (Denmark) Korsør (1828-1845); (Denmark) Copenhagen (1845-1864); (Denmark) Kastrup (1864-1867)
- Route: Korsør-Nyborg (1828-44); Aarhus-Kalundborg (1848-50)
- Builder: George Graham, Harwich
- Cost: GBP 4,400
- Launched: 1828-03-31
- Completed: 1828-05-02
- Out of service: 1867
- Fate: Broken up after 1867.

General characteristics
- Tonnage: 54 ton
- Length: 21.25 m (69.7 ft)
- Beam: 3.6 m (12 ft)
- Draught: 2.4 m (7.9 ft)
- Propulsion: Steam: Two 2cyl 16 HP Maudsley engines, total 32 nHP, 200 ihp.
- Speed: 7.5 knots

Mercurius was a paddle-wheel steamer, built in the United Kingdom in 1828. The ship was ordered by the Royal Danish Mail Service in Copenhagen and was employed on the postal and passenger service on the Great Belt between Korsør and Nyborg. In 1856 she was sold to Joseph Owen & Sønner in Copenhagen and in 1864 she was acquired by Oscar Petersen with the name Robert. Removed from the ship list in 1867.

== Background ==
The Royal Danish Mail Service in the 1820s was characterized by a number of postal routes running through the Kingdom of Denmark and the duchies of Schleswig and Holstein. Its coaches carried passengers and mail, with stops at a number of inns where refreshments could be served and rooms provided. For mail and passengers going between the Danish islands, there was a number of small packet boats. When steamships arrived in Denmark, starting with the Caledonia in 1819, the Mail Service did their best to hinder their work, fearing that passengers and crew would secretly take mail along the faster routes, undermining the monopoly and revenue of the Mail Service. But in 1827 the mood changed and the public was allowed to send mail with the steamship Prindsesse Wilhelmine to Lübeck, and later with the Dania to Jutland, if the envelopes were marked accordingly. The Danish state set up a committee to inquire "if a steamship travelling the Great Belt could manage a storm, and if it could sail in winter, when there was no ice, but still cold enough for water splashing over the ship, to freeze on its deck and sides, possibly hindering the work of the paddles and machinery." In May 1827 came the reply, stating "that only a hurricane could delay or stop the ship, and the water running over the vessel during two hours of sailing in freezing weather would not compromise the journey." Based on that, the Royal Danish Mail ordered a steamship in England, for service on the Great Belt.

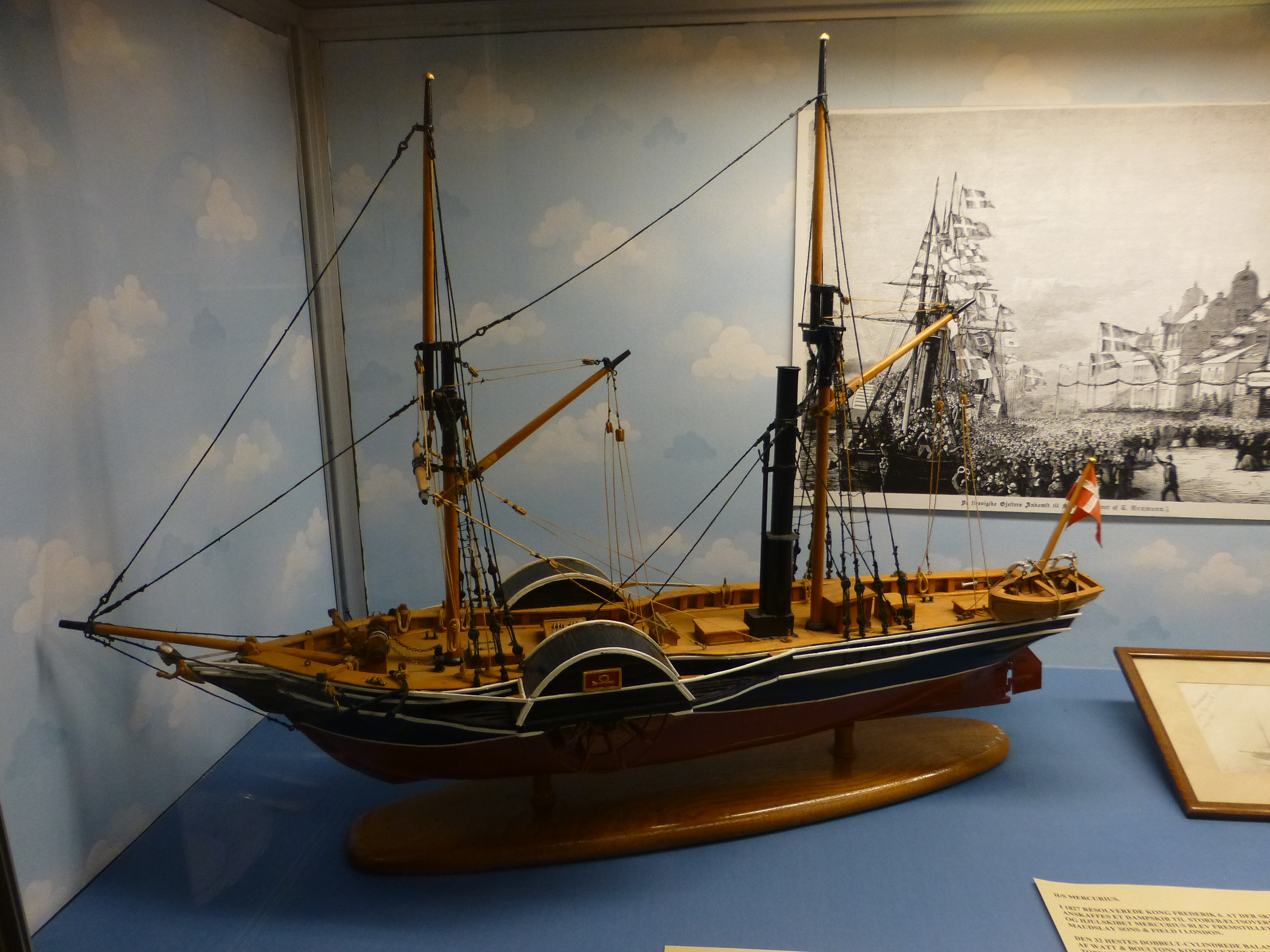
Model of Mercurius in the Great Belt transport museum in Korsør.

== The Great Belt route ==
The new ship was ordered from George Graham of Harwich. The choice of builder might have been influenced by the fact that in 1826 Graham had delivered two paddle steamers, Watersprite and Wizard, to the British Royal Mail. The Royal Danish Mail chose as their representative in England kaptajnløjtnant (lieutenant commander) Laurits Christensen. In spite of his naval rank, Christensen — his first name also spelled Lauritz — had not done active service since 1814, and his status as a reservist had enabled him to do business in the East Indies from 1816 til 1826. In 1827 he had bought the Quentin Durward in England, but he sold it in January 1828 and was ready for new employment. The yard in Harwich demanded 1,200 £ for the hull, and then there was the machinery, delivered and installed by Maudslay Sons and Field in London to the tune of 3,200 £. It consisted of two two-cylinder engines af 16 nominal hp each, giving a total output of around 200 indicated hp. Mercurius was accepted from the yard on May 2, 1828 and Christensen was master on the journey to Copenhagen, arriving on May 18. The first task of the ship would be to transport Prince Ferdinand from Copenhagen to Aarhus. After that, she sailed for Kalundborg to pick up king Frederick VI, who was also travelling to Aarhus, starting point for a tour of Jutland.

On June 11, 1828 the Mercurius left Korsør on her first scheduled trip to Nyborg. The estimated travel time was one hour and 50 minutes. The master was J. Jespersen, who had been master of one of the packet boats on the route, and the chief engineer was Edward Allingham, hired by Christensen before the departure from England. It is worth noting that while the master had a yearly salary of 350 rigsbankdaler (rbd), the first mate 192 rbd and the sailors 144 rbd, Allingham was paid around 900 rbd. His knowledge of the machinery was, however, valuable, for upon his dismissal in 1837, his successor's limitations resulted in numerous engine failures. In 1844, the steamship Kronprins Frederik Carl Christian entered service on the Belt, leaving the Mercurius to do miscellaneous tasks. Most important of those was her time on the route Aarhus-Kalundborg in 1848-1850, while steamships were in heavy demand during the First Schleswig War. In the 1840s and 1850s the ship was often called upon for use as a tug, as in 1853 when she towed the schooner that was tasked with laying a telegraph cable between Nyborg and Korsør.

== The last years ==
In 1856 the Mercurius was sold to Joseph Owen & Sønner (Sons) of Copenhagen, and they used the vessel as a tug and a dredger. In 1864 the ship was bought by Oscar Petersen of Kastrup. He owned a number of tugs and salvage vessels, and the Mercurius joined his fleet with the new name Robert. The old ship was removed from the Danish ship register in 1867.
