= PS Frederik den Sjette =

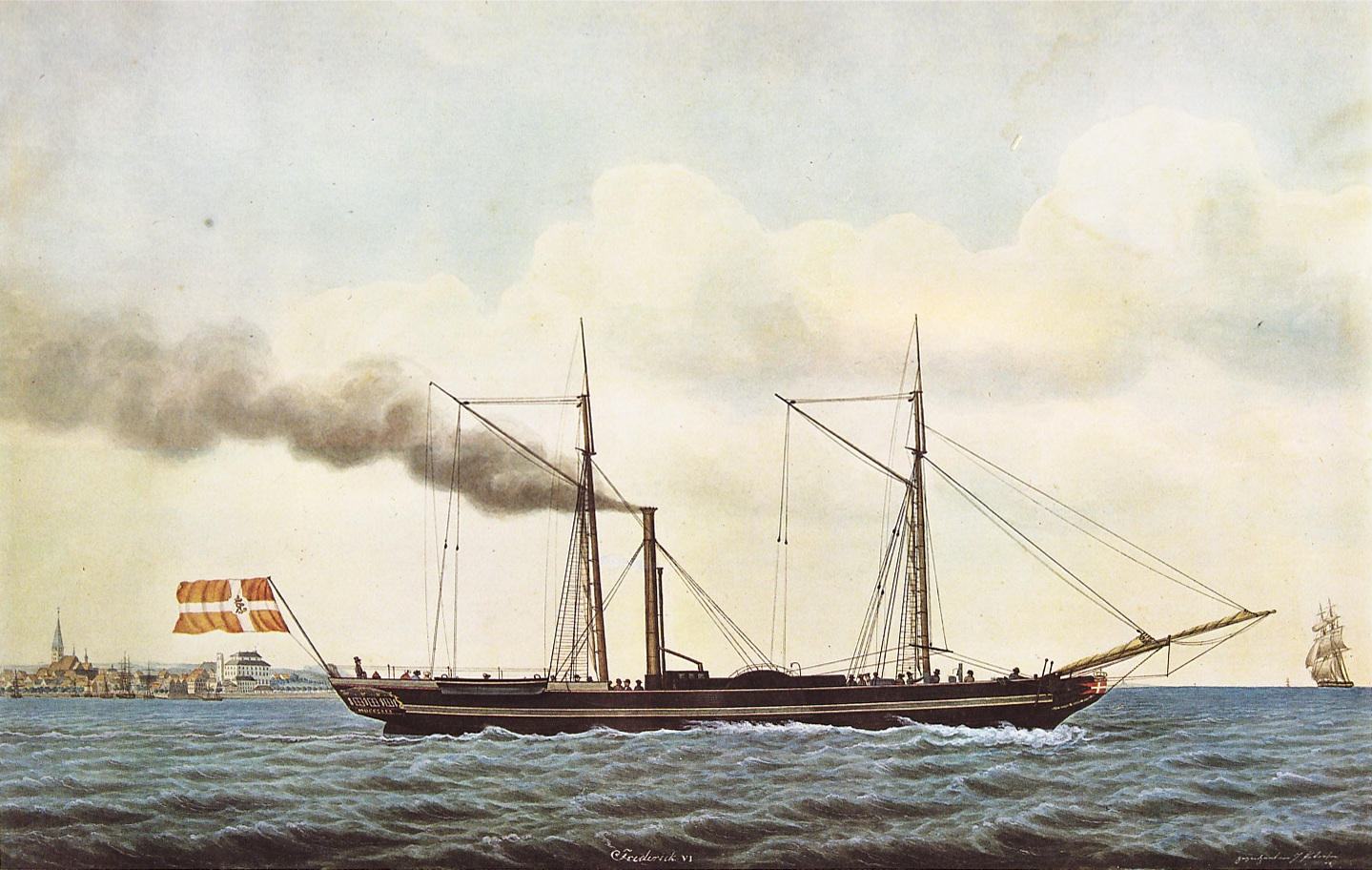
- Ship portrait by Jacob Petersen, made around 1830.

History
- Name: Frederik den Sjette
- Owner: 1830: The merchant Lauritz Nicolai Hvidt of Copenhagen.; 1845: A. Fibiger of Copenhagen.
- Port of registry: (Denmark) Copenhagen (1830-1845)
- Route: Copenhagen-Kiel (1830-43); Copenhagen-Lübeck (1830-42); Copenhagen-Stettin (1844); Copenhagen-Flensburg (1845).
- Builder: Jacob Holm, Christianshavn
- Laid down: 1829-12-05
- Launched: 1830-06-12
- Completed: 1830-07-12
- Out of service: 1845
- Fate: Foundered in Grønsund, 1845-10-04.

General characteristics
- Tonnage: 150 nrt
- Length: 37.5 m (123 ft)
- Beam: 8.5 m (28 ft)
- Draught: 3.5 m (11 ft)
- Propulsion: Steam: Two 40 HP Maudslay engines, total 80 nHP.
- Speed: 8 knots

Frederik den Sjette was a paddle-wheel steamer, built in 1830 for the merchant Lauritz Nicolai Hvidt of Copenhagen. She was the first steamship to be built in Denmark, with the notable exception of the steam engine, which was delivered from England. The vessel replaced the Caledonia on the route between Copenhagen and Kiel, and she had other routes as well. Sold in 1845 and foundered later that year. The ship was named in honour of the ruling king of Denmark and was also referred to as Frederik den Siette, Frederik VI and Frederik 6.

== Background ==
In 1821, after just two years had expired of a 10-year monopoly, the owner of Caledonia, Steen Andersen Bille, asked for, and was granted an extension of his exclusive right to employ a steamship between Copenhagen and Kiel, covering the years 1829 to 1839. In return, he had to acquire a new vessel before 1829. In 1822, Bille sold the ship and his interests in the route to the merchant L. N. Hvidt, and in 1828, Hvidt was forced to ask for a modification to the contract, as the new ship was not ready. But in 1829, Hvidt was ready to order the steamship from Peter Jørgensen, a shipbuilder at Jacob Holm's shipyard in Christianshavn, and the keel was laid on December 5. No Danish enterprises could provide steam engines for marine use, so the machinery was ordered from Maudslay, Sons and Field in London, arriving to Denmark in May 1830. The ship was ready in July of that year and was named Frederik den Sjette.

The general public was kept informed through the press. On March 29, 1830, the Adresseavisen wrote that Caledonia would commence its weekly departures for Kiel, beginning on Tuesday, April 20, and continue until relieved during the summer by a larger steamship, presently being built. On Saturday, June 12, the ship was launched, and the newspaper Dagen wrote on June 14, that the celebrations included 60-70 shipyard workers performing two songs written for the occasion, both of which were quoted in the paper. The description of Frederik den Sjette emphasized the three cabins, clad with mahogany: There was a large cabin for 42 travellers, a ladies' cabin with room for 20 and two adjoined family cabins, each housing five persons. For second class passengers there was a cabin in the bow, with space for 20, and the crew cabin, also in the bow.

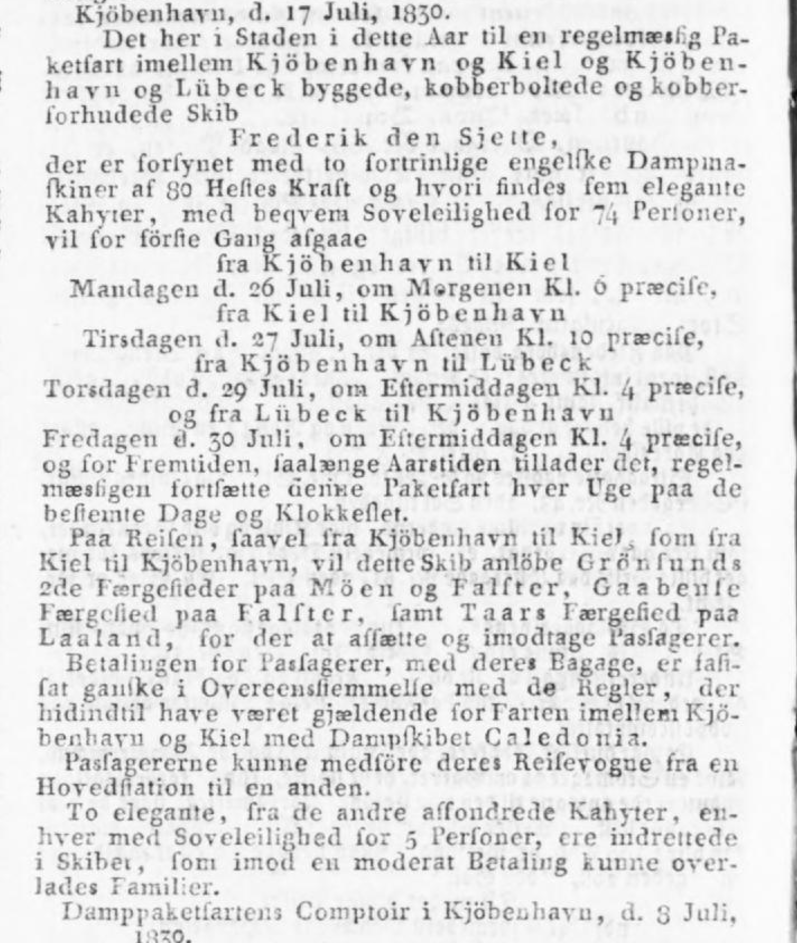
Advertisement for the first scheduled departure of Frederik den Sjette, in the Copenhagen Adresseavisen, July 20, 1830.

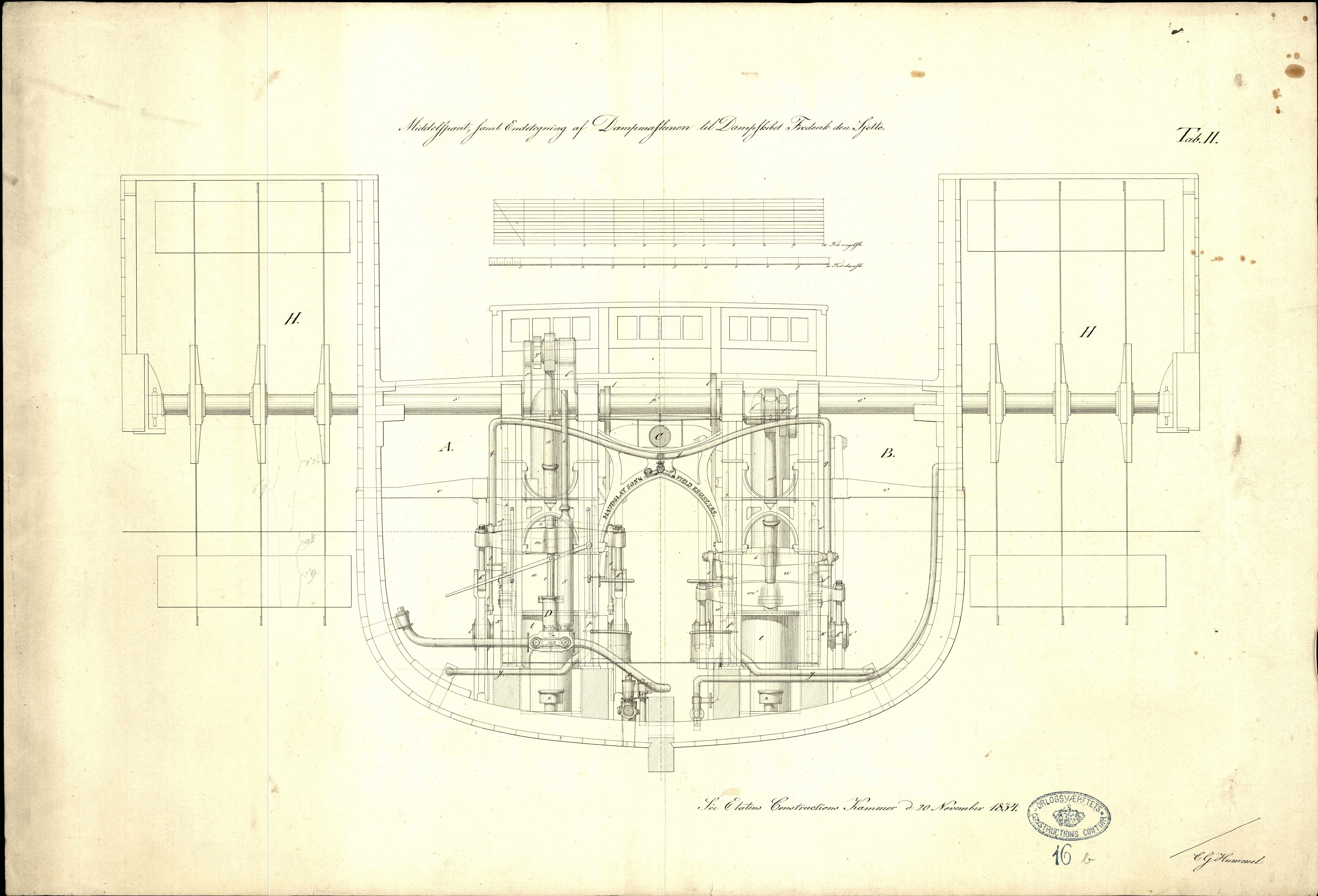
The later professor and director at DTU, Christian Gotfried Hummel, made a thorough measurement of the ship's advanced machinery. His papers are now in the Danish National Archives.

== Routes to Kiel and Lübeck ==
Frederik den Sjette was delivered from the yard on July 12, 1830, and its first official tour went to Helsingør on July 18. The first trip to Kiel took place on July 26, and an advertisement in Kiøbenhavns Kongelig alene priviligerede Adresse-Contoirs Efterretninger ("Adresseavisen") on July 20 informed the public that the new, larger vessel would not take the usual route west of the island of Møn, but would avoid the shallow waters of Bøgestrømmen and go east of Møn. The new ports of call on Møn and Falster would be the ferry ports in the sound of Grønsund. Next call would be at Gåbense on Falster and Tårs on Lolland, and then on to Kiel. The new ship would also travel between Copenhagen and Lübeck each week, with first departure on July 29. The owner seems to have re–evaluated the accommodation of the cabins and now cites space for 74 travelling first class and 36 travelling second class. Third class passengers had to stay on the deck.

While Frederik den Sjette enjoyed its monopoly on the Kiel route, things were different on the service to Lübeck (Travemünde). Here it competed directly with the Prindsesse Wilhelmine. The number of passengers was not high enough to fill both ships, so when the privileges obtained by Prindsesse Wilhelmines expired in 1833, the ship was removed from the route. The owner of Frederik den Sjette enjoyed good results until 1839. In that year, a Swedish shipping company employed their new steamer Malmö on a route between Malmö, Copenhagen and Lübeck/Travemünde. Again there were not enough passengers, and at the end of 1842, L. N. Hvidt removed Frederik den Sjette from the route.

The route to Kiel saw some competition, beginning in 1835. The monopoly only counted for ships departing from Copenhagen, and a new company started a route to Kiel from Karrebæksminde, on the opposite side of Zealand. They bought the steamship Løven in 1835. When the privileges concerning Copenhagen ran out in 1840, a more serious competitor arrived. The merchant M. T. Schmidt of Kiel and the merchant and banker Conrad Hinrich Donner of Altona made a partnership and acquired the steamship Christian VIII for the route. The new vessel sailed directly between the two cities and was thus a faster alternative. There were not enough passengers for two ships and in 1843, Frederik den Sjette left the route.

== The last years ==
By 1844, with both of the routes given up, Hvidt instead made a charter agreement with the Danish postal service. They needed Frederik den Sjette because of an 1843 agreement with the postal service of Prussia. In that agreement, the Danish state had promised to build a ship to serve on the route between Copenhagen and Stettin, carrying passengers, goods and mail. Prussia would then pay part of the running expenses. The new ship, Gejser would not be ready until 1845, so in 1844 Frederik den Sjette provided the service. In 1845, the paddle steamer lacked employment, and L. N. Hvidt chose to sell the ship, July 15, 1845. The buyer was the merchant A. Fibiger of Copenhagen, who had spotted a business opportunity: On June 23, the steamship Königinn Caroline Amalie had hit a large stone in the waters between Omø and Agersø. She sprang a leak and sank, but all aboard were saved. Now a ship was needed to fill in on the route between Flensburg and Copenhagen, and that is why Fibiger bought Frederik den Sjette. The engagement did not last long. On October 4, the ship passed the shallow waters of Tolken in Grønsund and sprang a leak. The new master, lieutenant Tuxen of the Danish Navy, managed to settle her at Madses Klint, and everyone got ashore safely. The next days brought stormy weather, and Frederik den Sjette was completely wrecked and had to be abandoned. The turn of events were extensively covered by the Danish press, and Berlingske Tidende concluded: An unlucky star seems to preside over the steamship service between Copenhagen and Flensburg.
