= PS Eagle =

Paddle-wheel steamer from the United Kingdom

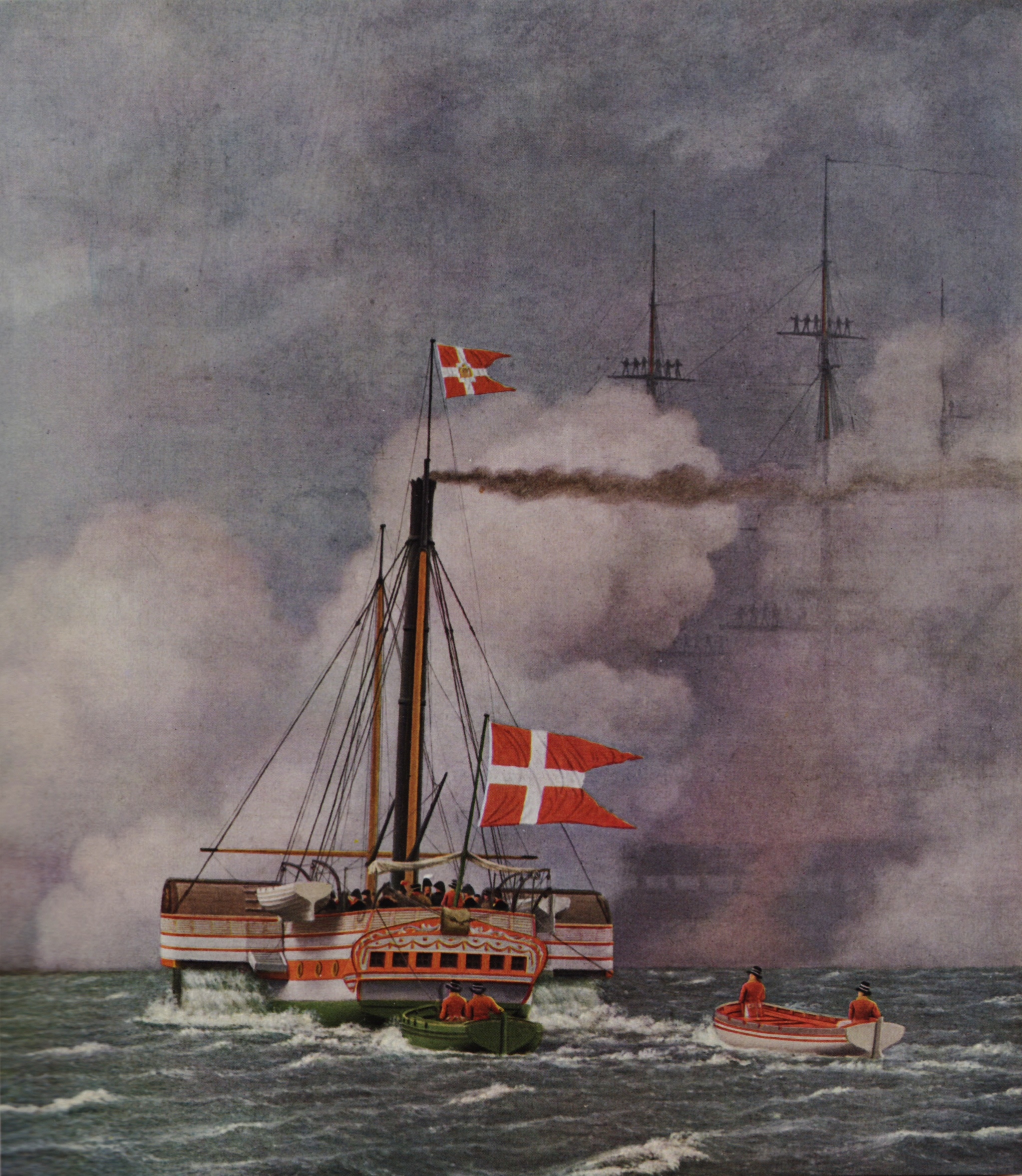
- The Kiel in Royal service in Denmark (Detail from painting by C. W. Eckersberg)

History
- Name: Eagle; Kiel; Frederik 6'tes minde
- Owner: 1821: T. Brocklebank, C. Bell & others, London; 1824: Royal Danish Navy; 1848: Schleswig-Holsteinische Marine; 1851: Royal Danish Navy; 1865: J.P. Larsen, Løkken; 1886: Lars Christian Nielsen
- Operator: Eagle & Falcon Steam Packet Co., London
- Port of registry: (United Kingdom) London (1821–1824); (Denmark) Copenhagen (1824–1848); (German Confederation) (1848–1851); (Denmark) Copenhagen (1851–1865); (Denmark) Løkken (1865–1897)
- Route: London – Margate (1821–1824)
- Builder: Thomas Brocklebank, Deptford
- Completed: 1821
- Out of service: 1897

General characteristics
- Tonnage: 158 tons
- Length: 27.9 m (92 ft)
- Beam: 6.5 m (21 ft)
- Draught: 1.6 m (5.2 ft)
- Propulsion: 1821 Two steam engines from Boulton and Watt, combined 40 nHP; 1853 No machinery
- Speed: 7 knots (normal speed)
- Crew: 11 (4 in engine room)

Eagle was a paddle-wheel steamer, built in England in 1821. The ship was bought by the Royal Danish Navy in 1824 and became its first steamship. It was bought as a personal transport for the Royal Family of Denmark and got the name Kiel. Rebuilt as a two-masted schooner in 1853 and eventually broken up in 1897.

== Under British colours ==
Thomas Brocklebank was in the timber business and also had a shipyard in Deptford on the Thames. In 1821 his yard delivered the paddle steamer Eagle, which became the first steamer on the service between London and Margate. Margate was a popular seaside venue on the eastern tip of Kent, known for its fine sand beaches. Brocklebank was also in charge of the shipping company that owned the Eagle, called the Eagle & Falcon Steam Packet Co.. There is no record of a Falcon, but in 1822 the Royal Sovereign was completed and taken over, also built at Brocklebank's yard. Thomas Brocklebank got in contact with William John Hall, who had ships going between Hull and London, and they were in charge of the formation of the General Steam Navigation Company, officially instituted at a meeting in June 1824. Just prior to that—in May—the Eagle had been sold to the Kingdom of Denmark, so the new shipping company opened service with the Royal Sovereign and the brand new City of London, also built by Brocklebank, in 1824.

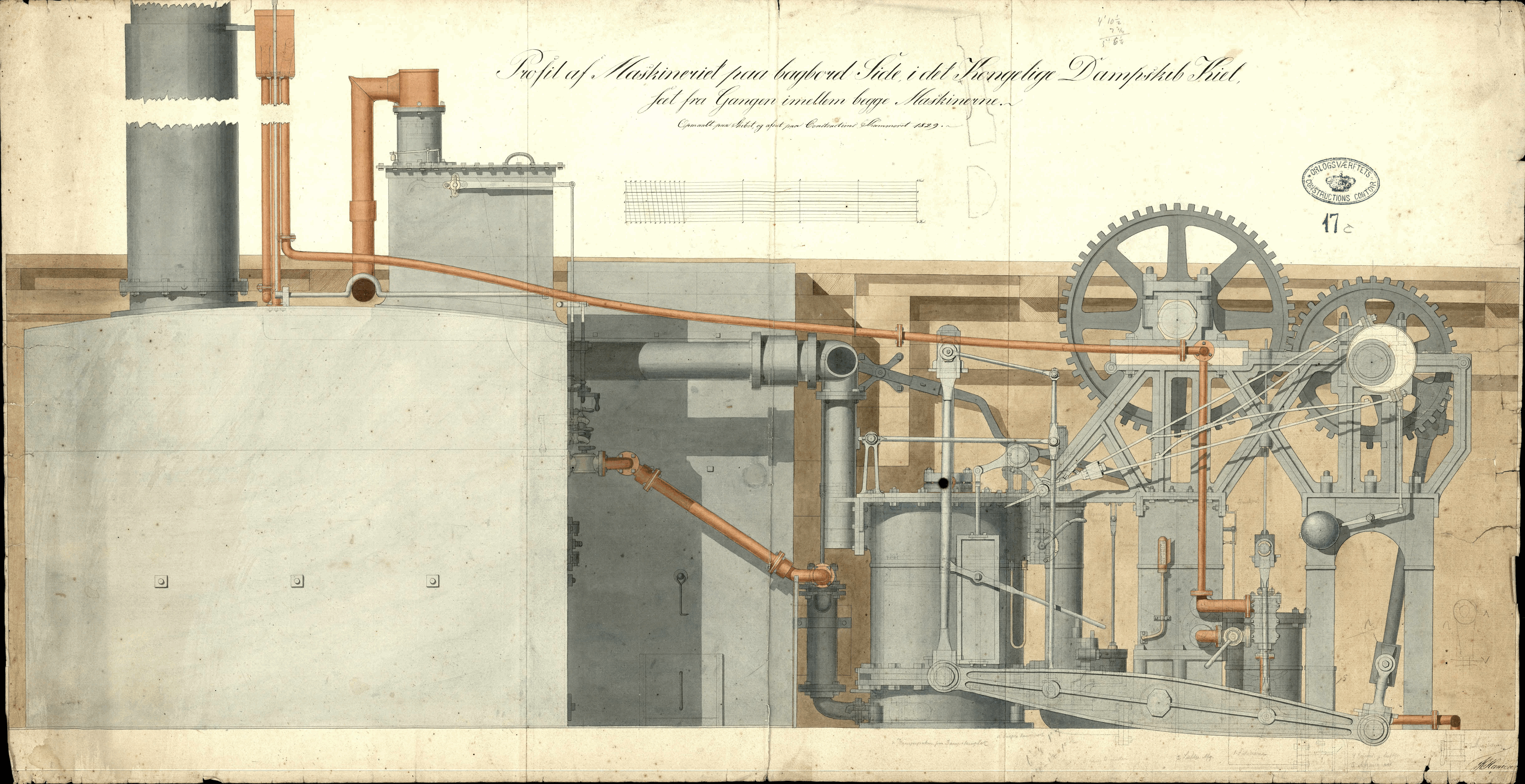
The port engine of the Eagle/Kiel, measured and drawn in 1829

The Eagle had two steam engines from Boulton and Watt. They delivered a total of 40 nominal horsepower, giving the vessel a speed of 6 to 7 knots. In Danish service the crew numbered 11, with four of these working the machinery. The boilers were replaced in 1828 and 1842, which was normal practise in those days. The stated width refers to the normal hull, but including the wheel covers the vessel was almost 10 metres wide, giving it a beam-to-length ratio of approximately 1:3.

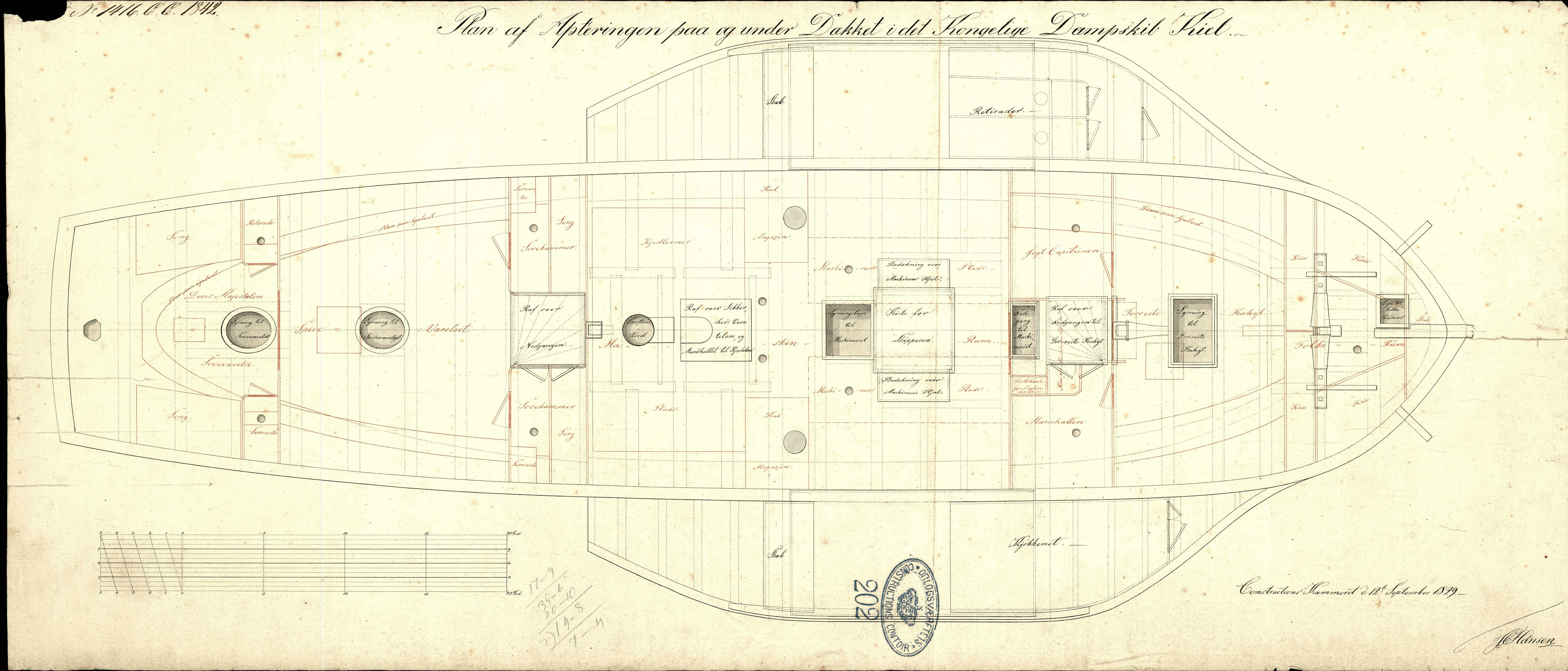
The Kiel was measured and drawn by Orlogsværftet in 1829. Her high-beam-to-length ratio clearly stands out.

== Under Danish colours ==
When steamships started to appear, the admiralties of the different navies started to consider their military value. The general conception was that the big wheels on the sides made the vessels too vulnerable for service in naval battles, but their effectiveness as tugs and transports was recognized. In Denmark there was opposition against any procurement, because the funds would have to be diverted from the general naval budget, which was under great stress, as the Royal Danish Navy was still in the process of rebuilding the fleet after the disastrous events of the Napoleonic Wars. There was, however, a need for a Royal yacht for king Frederick VI, and as the king wanted a steamship, there would be an opportunity to use it and gain some experience with steam power. It is telling, that Schultz underlines that it was the king who pushed for the purchase of paddle wheelers. The Danish naval lieutenant Hans Christian Bodenhoff was on a tour of duty in England, and, following royal approval of the project on 19 March 1824, he was commanded to find an appropriate vessel. In May 1824 he bought the Eagle for £4,500 and the ship got new aft cabins modelled on George III's yacht Royal Sovereign. The new Royal yacht was renamed as the Kiel and with Bodenhoff in command it arrived in Copenhagen on 4 June 1824.

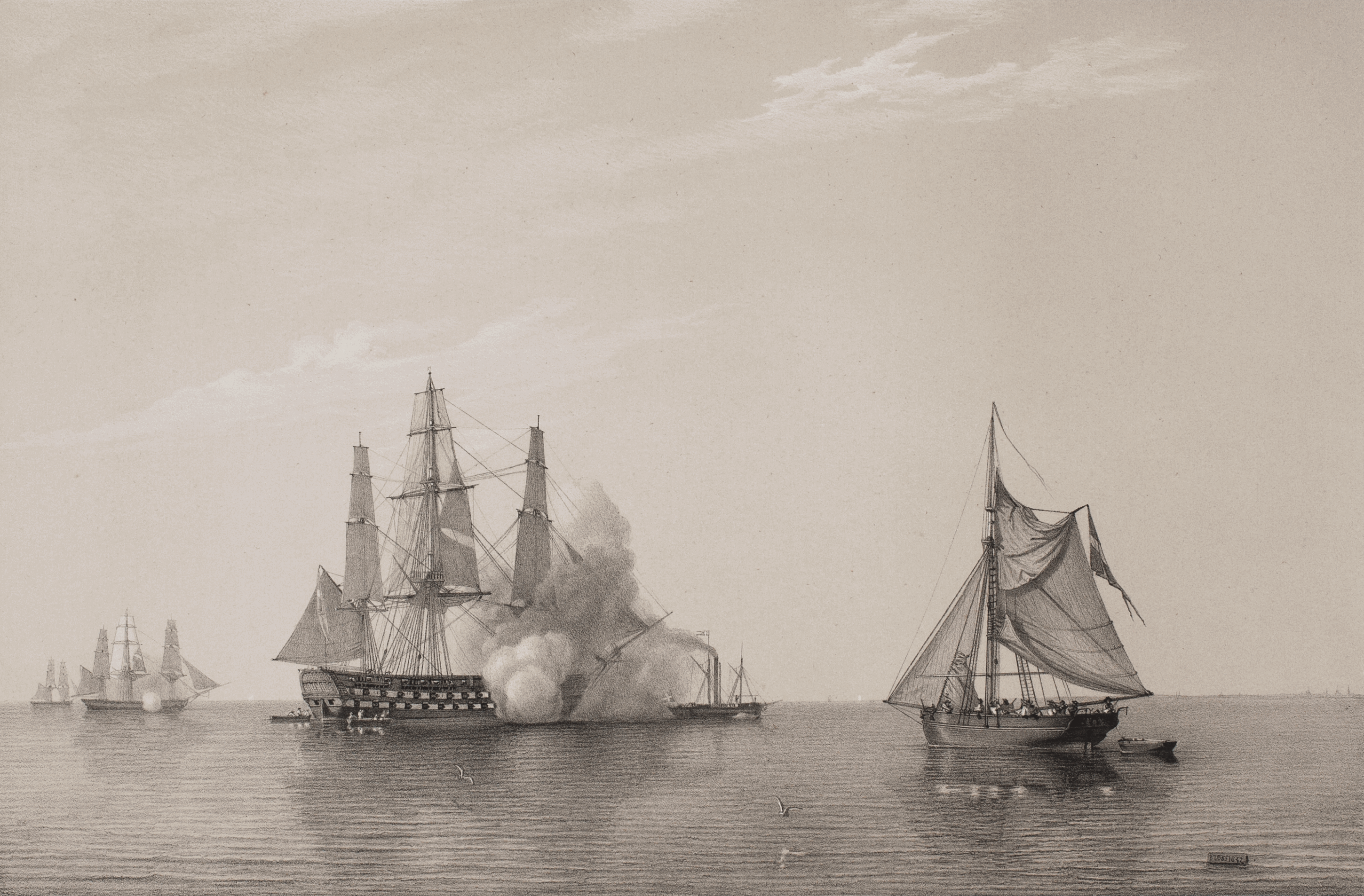
Kiel joining a Danish Navy squadron in North Germany in 1841. A somewhat later print by Kittendorff based on a painting by Frederik Kloss.

Frederick VI used the ship extensively for his many travels around the kingdom of Denmark, right up to his death in 1839. In that year, the Danish admiralty had proposed the procurement of a new steamship. When the new king, Christian VIII, was informed of this, he initially put the proposal on hold, but in March 1840 the King approved the purchase of two steamships, the smallest of which would serve as the new Royal yacht. It was named Ægir and arrived in Denmark in October 1841. In November the Kiel was lent to the shipping service on the Great Belt, as the mail steamer Mercurius was up for maintenance. When the vessel was returned in March 1842 she was inspected and found to be in bad shape. So bad, actually, that the master of the Royal dockyard (Orlogsværftet) recommended that the Kiel should be broken up. But the admiralty wanted to keep her in reserve, so the hull was repaired and new boilers were built in Frederiksværk. Demand for the retiree appeared almost immediately. King Christian VIII spent his summer vacations in Wyk on the island Föhr, and he had had the unpleasant experience of seeing his coach sent into the waves by the boom of the regular sailing ship serving the island. So in the years 1843–1846 he saw to it that the Kiel was made available for his transportation, and as the ship was there, it could also deliver guests to the popular bathing establishment on the island—in return for payment to the Danish Navy, of course. In 1847 the Danish Navy's new paddle wheeler Hebe took over. During its service in the Wadden Sea, the Kiel took time off for a detour to Øresund in June 1844, when the Prindsesse Wilhelmine surrendered her machinery to the new Hertha. This meant that there was no tug service in the Sound, and so for a time the Kiel took over, until the King went on vacation. During the winters, the Kiel was based in Altona, and this continued when the Hebe arrived. As her transport services were no longer needed, the Kiel was instead lent to the Harbour Commission of the town Glückstadt.

== Under German colours ==
When the First Schleswig War broke out in March 1848, the Kiel was still in Glückstadt, in what was now rebel/enemy waters. The insurgents of Schleswig-Holstein had no navy, but were intent on acquiring one. Officially, this would be done by creating a Scleswig-Holstein naval force under the auspices of the newly created German Reichsflotte. The Kiel was incorporated in this force and became a part of the Westsee Division. She was used as a troop transport and also served as a tug for the rowed gunboats of the new navy. The efforts of the Division were effective enough to force the Danish troops in the area to retreat to the island of Fanø. In German service the Kiel was equipped with four 18-pounder guns. At the end of the war, Kiel was returned to Denmark.

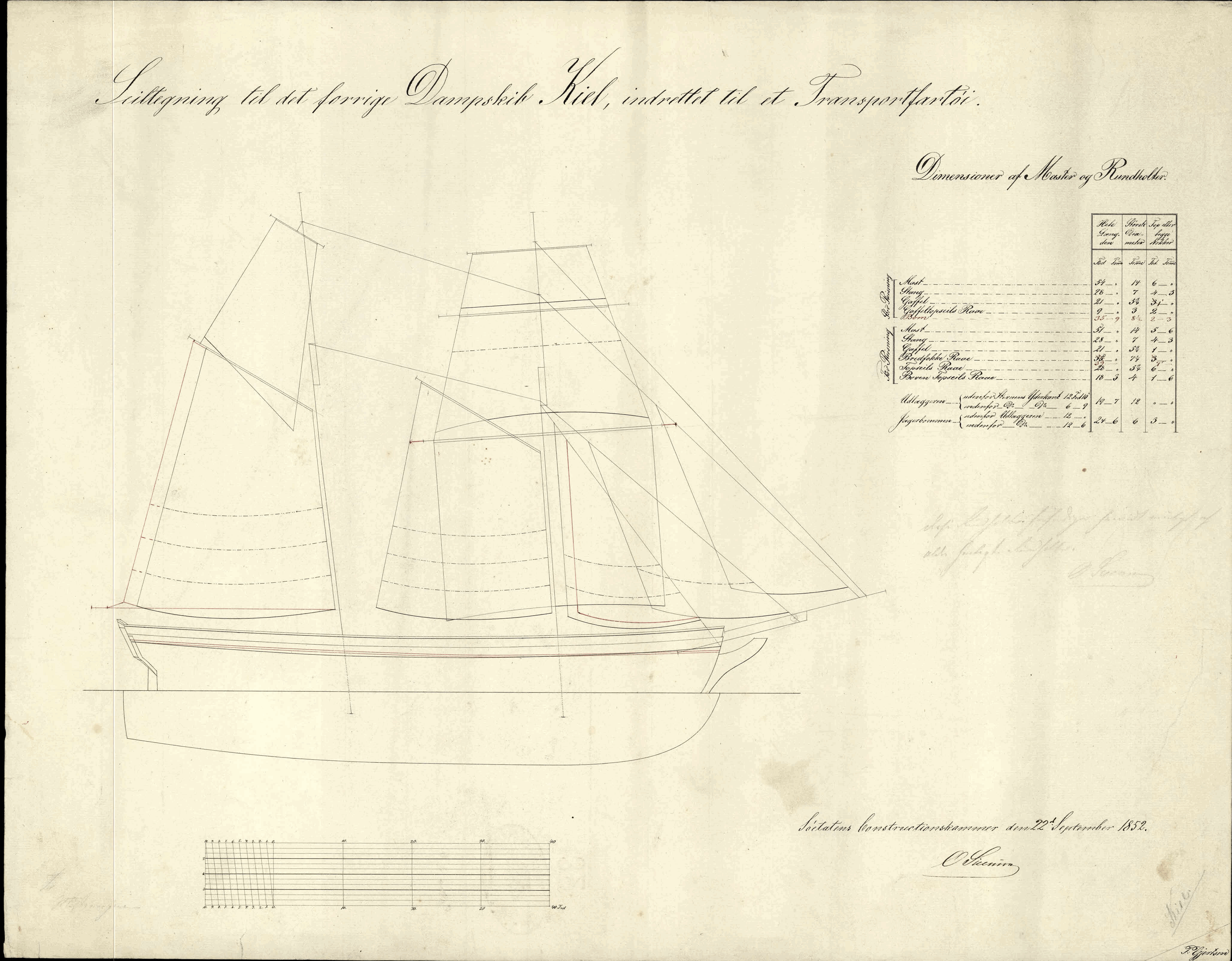
Orlogsværftet in Copenhagen made this proposal for the rigging of Kiel as a transport schooner in 1852.

== Back under Danish colours ==
At the end of the First Schleswig War, and following negotiations, the Kiel was returned to the Royal Danish Navy in August 1851. There was really no use for her, and she was put up for sale at two auctions in 1851 and 1852. A plan B was then carried out, with the machinery being removed and the vessel rebuilt as a transport schooner. The Navy sold the Kiel in April 1865 to the merchant J. P. Larsen of Løkken. He changed the name to Frederik 6's Minde. After Larsen's death, his widow married the land owner Lars Christian Nielsen, and he was the majority owner of the vessel from 1885. In 1892—after his death—it became part of the estate of Nielsen. The old oak planks must have been well put together, for the ship soldiered on and could be found in the ship registry until February 1897, when it was finally reported as broken up.
