= Lauritz Nicolai Hvidt =

Danish merchant and politician (1777–1856)

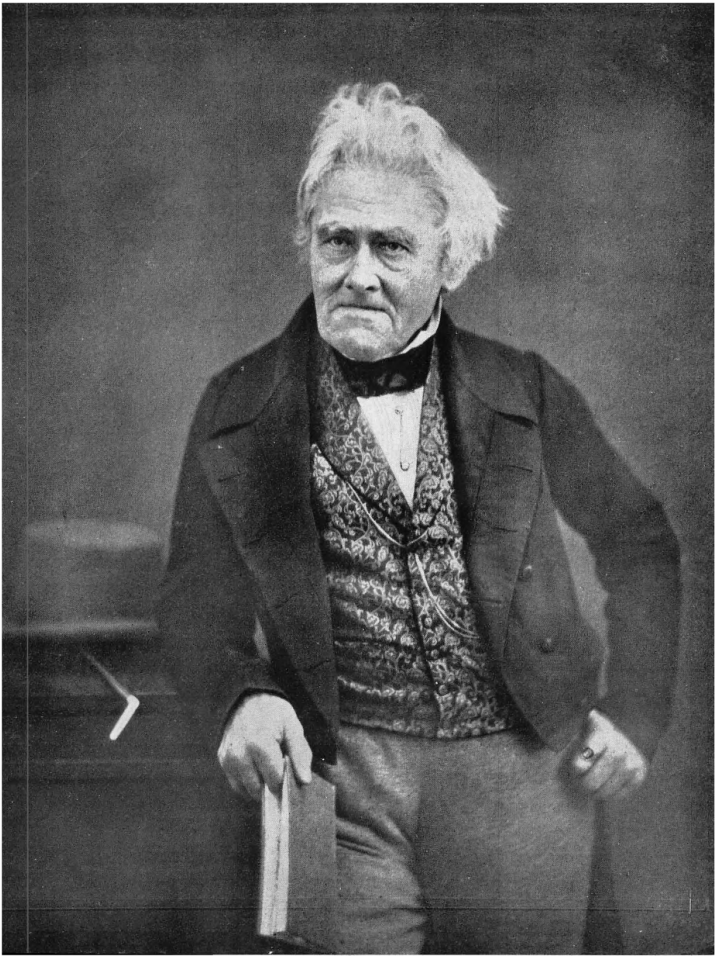
- Born: 27 October 1777; Rønne, Denmark
- Died: 16 March 1856 (aged 78); Copenhagen, Denmark
- Occupations: Businessman and politician
- Awards: Commander of the Order of the Dannebrog, 1849

Lauritz Nicolai Hvidt (27 October 1777 – 16 March 1856) was a Danish merchant and politician. His trading house mainly traded on the Danish West Indies. He was also part of the management of the marine insurance company De private Assurandeurer and director of the Bank of Denmark. As a liberal politician, he was involved in the work for a free constitution and a co-founder of the Free Press Society (Trykkefrihedsselskabet). He was a member of the Copenhagen City Council from 1840 and its chairman from 1841. He lived in the now listed building at Kronprinsessegade 28 from 1812.

== Early life and education ==
Hvidt was born in Copenhagen, the only son of textile merchant and later royal agent Niels Nielsen Hvidt (1738–1798) and Anna Beata Schwindt (1739–1808). He graduated from Borgerdyd School in 1681 and then studied theology at the University of Copenhagen from 1791 to 1795. He then worked as a house teacher for district governor C.L. Scheel-Plessen at Lindholm.

== Career ==
Hvidt took over the family's trading house when his father suddenly died in 1798. The trading house thrived under his management but was hit hard by the war with England. Hvidt intended to study law but was instead employed as an exchange commissioner (børskommissær) in 1809. He was appointed as member of several commissions and had a significant influence on the important veksellov of 1825.

Gvidt revived his trading house in 1816. The company mainly traded on Saint Croix in the Danish West Indies. After a few years he had restored his position as one of the largest ship-owners in the country. Hvidt acquired Denmark's first steam vessel Caledonia in 1822 and a few years later commissioned the first steam vessel built in Denmark from Jacob Holm's shipyard.

Hvidt was also active in the insurance market. From 1830 to 1835, he was a member of the Bank of Denmark's board of representatives and was one of its two commercial directors from 1835 and until his death. He was also a member of Københavns Sparekasse's board of directors.

He was a member of Grosserer-Societetet's committee from 1817 and was in 1842 elected as its president. He was appointed as curator of Vajsenhuset in 1821 and was a member of the College of Missions from 1838 to 1854.

== Politic and public offices ==
In the 1830s and 1840s, Hvidt was a central figure in the liberal movement. He was elected as a member of De Oplyste Mænds Forsamling in 1832 and was vice president of the Provincial Assemblies (Stænderforsamlingerne) in 1835–1836, 1840 and 1842.

Hvidt and professor J.F. Schouw instigated the foundation of Trykkefrihedsselskabet in 1835. He was also a co-founder of Den Slesvigske Hjælpeforening in 1844. Hvidt was elected to the Copenhagen City Council in 1840 and served as its president from 1841 to 1853.

He was appointed as Minister Without Portfolio in the so-called March Cabinet and was involved in the drafting of the government's proposal for a democratic constitution. He was a fairly passive member of the Danish Constituent Assembly.

== Personal life ==
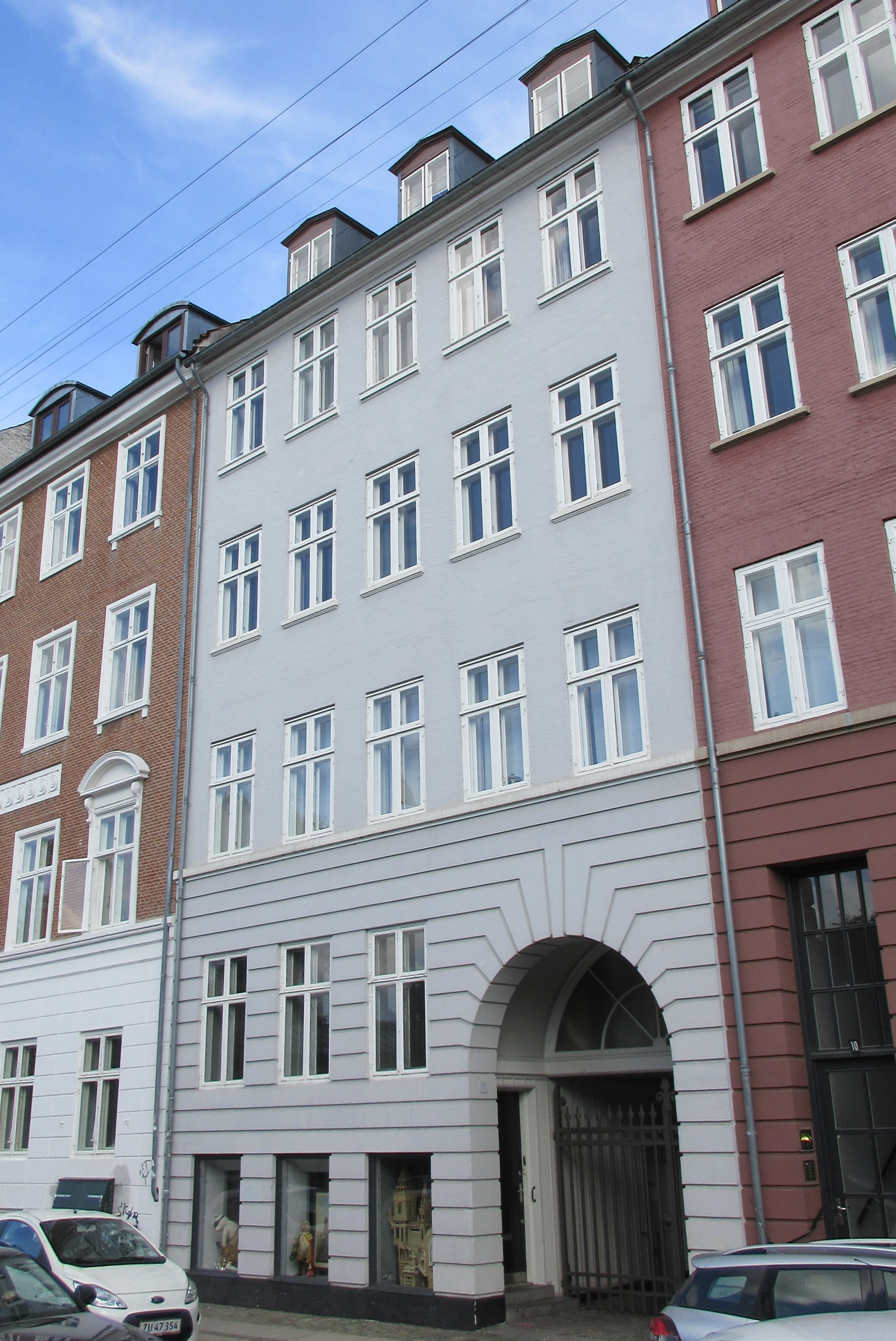
Kronprinsessegade 28

Hvidt married Wilhelmine Therese Lorck (28 May 1782 – 17 June 1852) on 20 August 1800 in Memel. She was a daughter of the Danish consul Lorentz Lorck (1743–1805) and Catharine Elisabeth Rohrdanz (1752–1831).

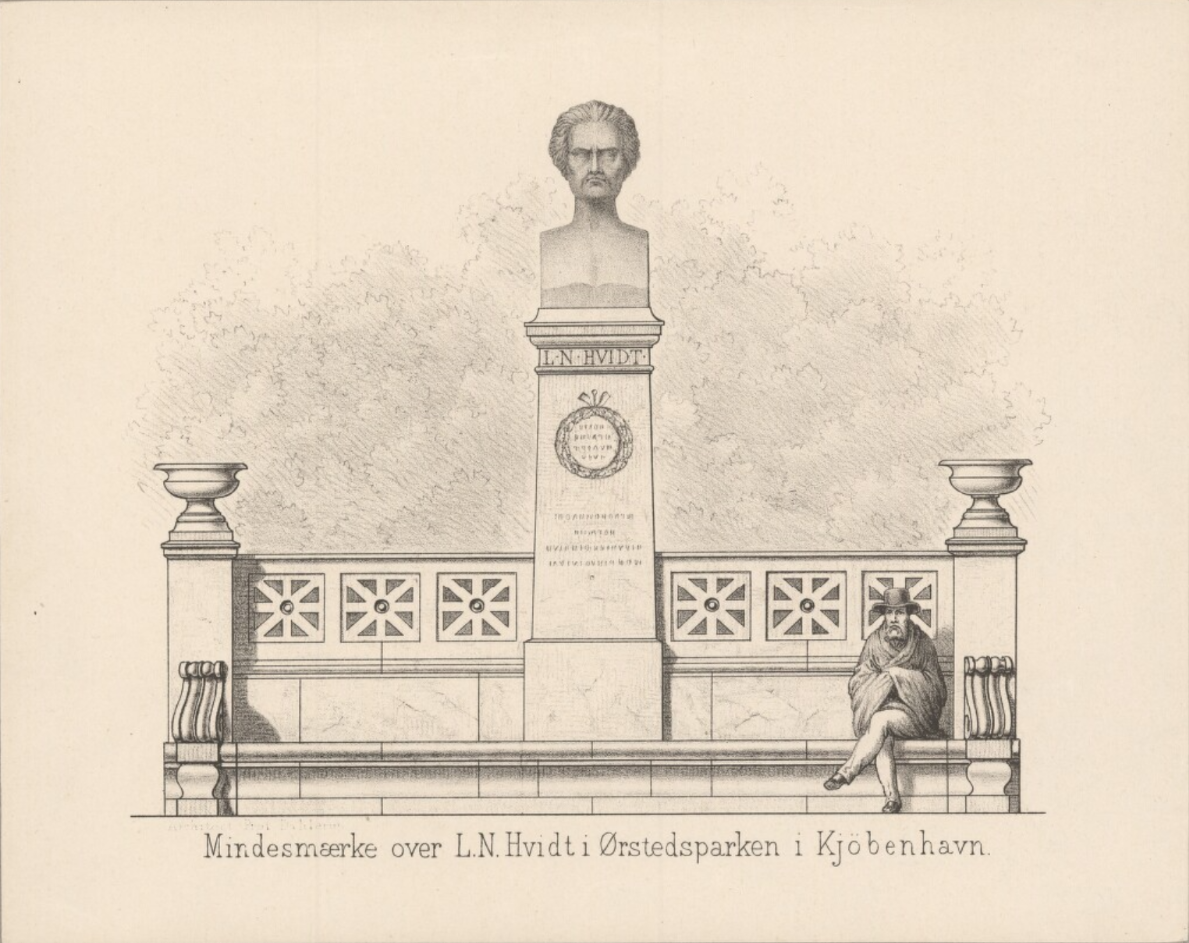
Rendering of the L N. Hvidt memorial which was installed in Ørsted Park in 1876

Hvidt acquired the building at Kronprinsessegade 28 in 1812 and lived there until his death. He died on 16 March 1856 and is buried at Assistens Cemetery. A memorial created by Vilhelm Bissen and Vilhelm Dahlerup was installed in Ørsted Park to mark the 100-year anniversary of Hvidt's birth. It incorporates a bronze bust of Hvidt created by Vilhelm Bissen on the basis of an older bust created by his father Herman Wilhelm Bissen.

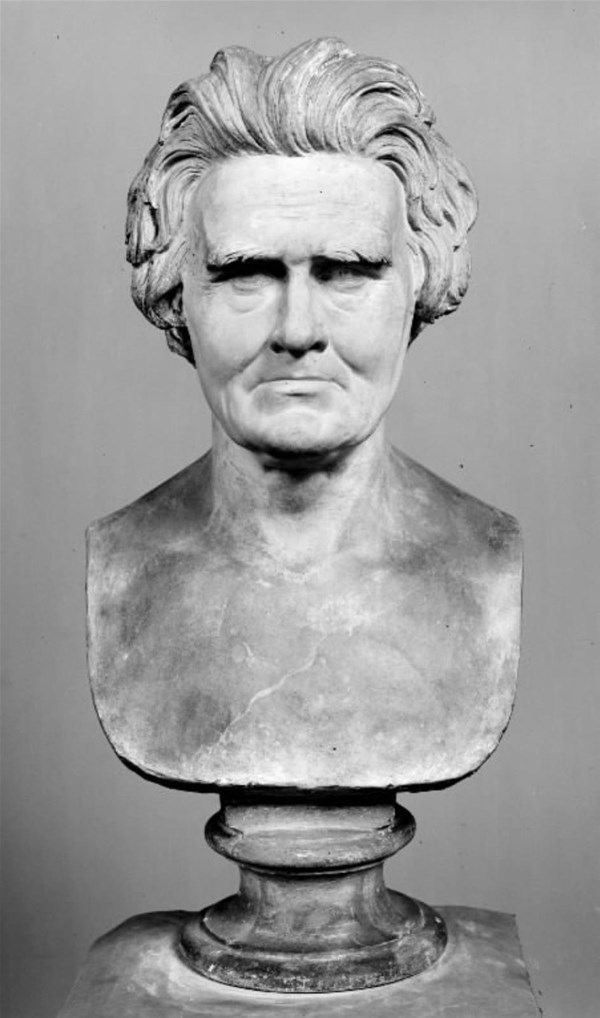
Bust of Hvidt by H. W. Bissen, 1865

Only five of Hvidt's nine children survived him. His eldest son, Eduard Julius Hvidt (8 August 1806 – 7 February 1882) continued his father's business. Another son, Waldemar Hvidt (7 July 1817 – 30 December 1878), owned Frihedslund. His eldest daughter, Elise Beate Hvidt (24 June 1801 – 13 June 1890), married Friederich Wilhelm Tutein, son of Friederich Tutein. He inherited the family's trading house as well as the Edelgave outside Copenhagen. Another daughter, Charlotte Henriette Hvidt (20 September 1813 – 8 June 1847), married engineer and politician Edvard Diderik Ehlers. He headed the Technical Department in Copenhagen.
