= PS Quentin Durward =

Paddle-wheel steamer

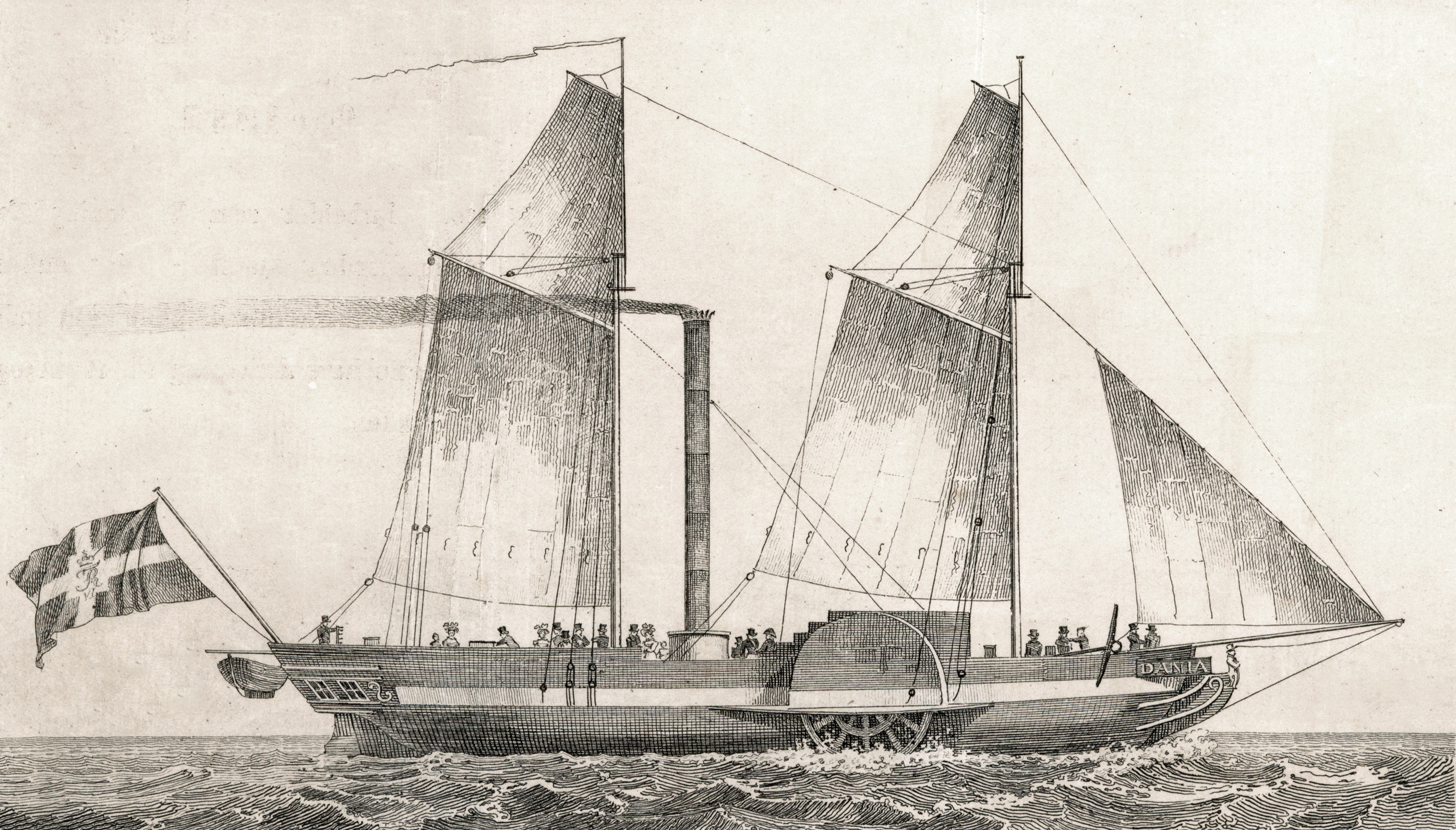
- Quentin Durward as the Dania, flying Danish colours

History
- Name: Quentin Durward; Dania
- Owner: 1823: R. Ogilvie og G. Crichton, Leith; 1826: The Brighton & Dieppe Steam Packet Co., Brighton; 1827: Laurits Christensen, Copenhagen; 1828: Partnership led by M. W. Sass of Copenhagen
- Port of registry: (United Kingdom) Leith (1823–26); (United Kingdom) Brighton (1826–27); (Denmark) Copenhagen (1827–1841)
- Route: Brighton–Dieppe (1823–1824); Leith–Dundee (1824–26); Newhaven–Grangemouth (1826); Brighton–Dieppe (1826–27); Copenhagen–Aarhus (1827–36); Copenhagen–Aalborg (1827); Copenhagen–Fredericia (1827–1833); Aarhus–Kalundborg (1836–1839)
- Builder: Sime & Rankine, Leith
- Launched: 1823-06-26
- Completed: 1823-07
- Out of service: 1839-11
- Fate: Broken up, Copenhagen 1841

General characteristics
- Tonnage: 78 tons
- Length: 32 m (106 ft)
- Beam: 5.0 m (16.5 ft)
- Draught: 2.7 m (9 ft)
- Propulsion: Steam: 2cyl 40 HP; 2 engines, total 48 nhp, 1831 rated at 52 nhp

Quentin Durward was a paddle-wheel steamer, built in the United Kingdom in 1823. The ship was bought in 1827 by a Danish businessman and was employed on a route between Copenhagen and ports in Jutland and Funen, with the name Dania. She later served on the route between Aarhus and Kalundborg. The paddle-wheeler was broken up in 1841.

== Under British colours ==
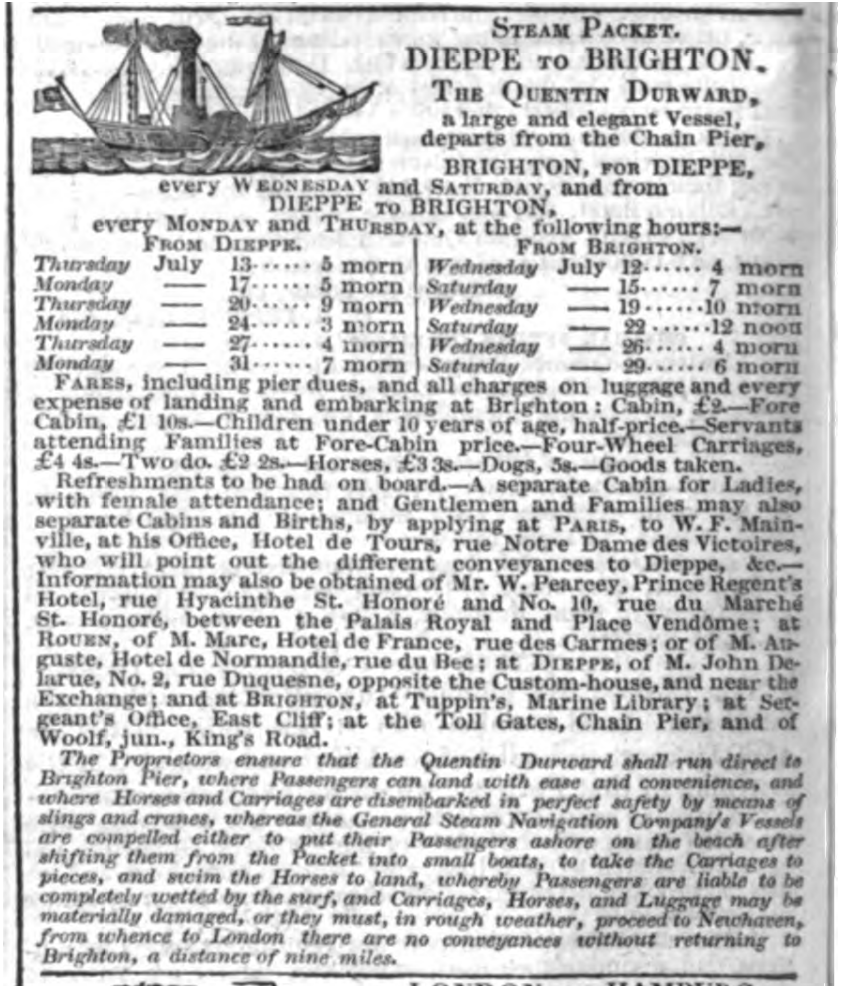
Advertisement in the Paris newspaper "Galignani's Messenger" for Quentin Durward, 10 July 1826.

The town of Leith in Scotland had proud traditions for shipbuilding. One of the oldest yards was that of Sime & Rankine, who in July 1823 delivered the paddle-steamer Quentin Durward to R. Ogilvie and G. Crichton of Leith. The name was taken from the title of a historical novel by Sir Walter Scott, published in 1823. The ship's first recorded voyage with passengers—in August 1823—was the long journey North and West from Leith via Aberdeen, Inverness, the Caledonian Canal, Fort William, Tobermory, Staffa, Giant's Causeway, Coleraine, Campbeltown and Kyles of Bute to Glasgow. On arrival, the steamship was put up for sale. Apparently, no sale took place, and in September 1823 the Quentin Durward made another long journey with passengers, this time from Greenock via Dublin, Plymouth and Portsmouth to Brighton. At the end of the trip, the ship was immediately employed on a route between Brighton and Dieppe in France. In April 1824 the Quentin Durward was chartered by the Leith & Dundee Steam Packet Co in Leith, and it commenced sailing on the route between Leith and Dundee the same month. In April 1826 the paddle-wheeler was back in the Channel, now employed on a route between Newhaven and Grangemouth. That turned out to be a short engagement, because the following month the ship was bought by The Brighton & Dieppe Steam Packet Co. in Brighton and once again sailed between Brighton and Dieppe. In June 1827 the paddle-wheeler was bought by kaptajnløjtnant (lieutenant commander) Laurits Christensen and her name was changed to Dania. In spite of his naval rank, Christensen—his first name also spelled Lauritz—had not done active service since 1814, and his status as a reservist had enabled him to do business in the East Indies from 1816 until 1826. The seller on the deed was the trader Richard Thornton.

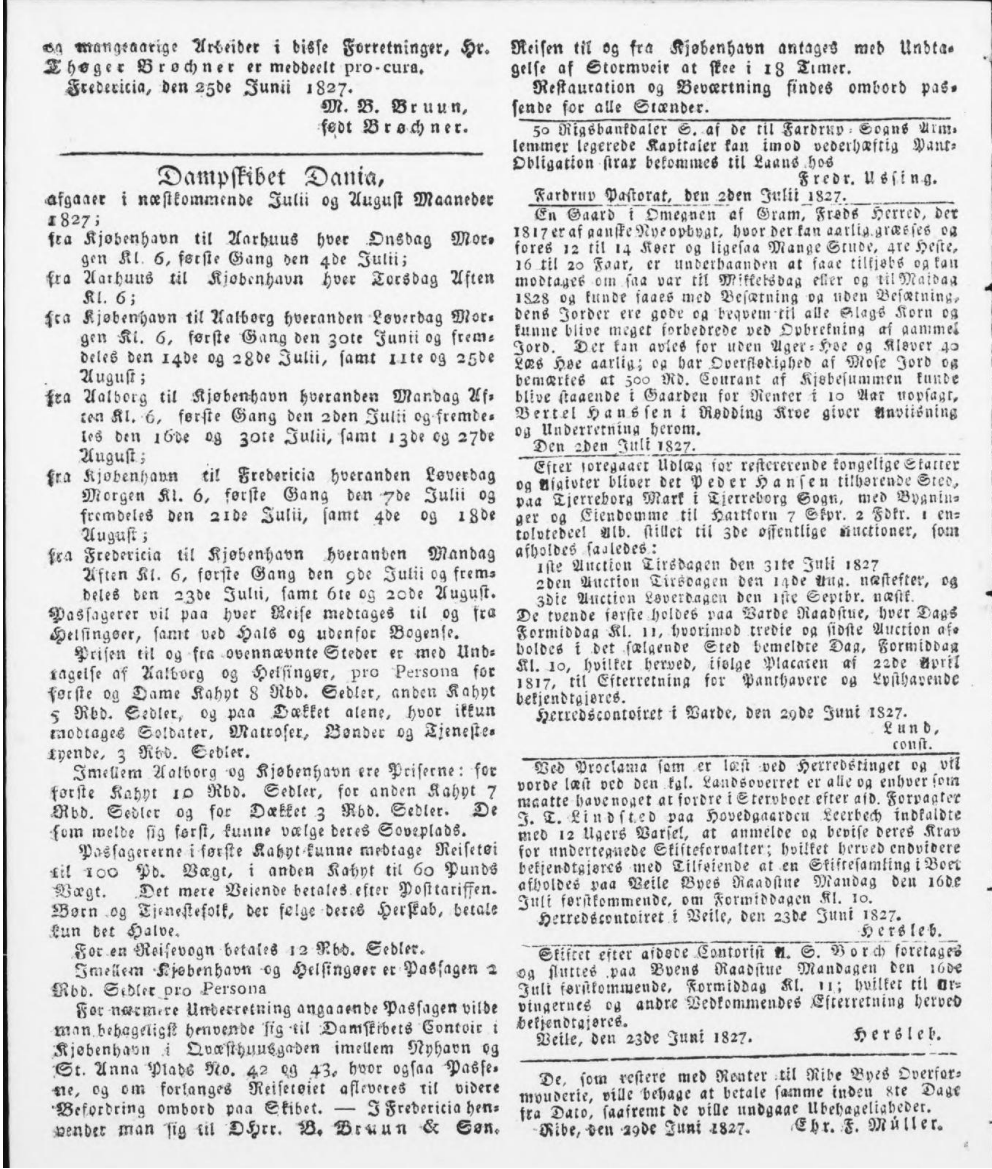
Advertisement for Dania in Ribe Stifts-Tidende, 3 July 1827.

== Under Danish colours ==
On 8 June 1827 Christensen put an advert in Den til Forsendelse med de Kongelige Rideposter privilegerede Danske Statstidende to announce that he had bought the steamship, which featured "30 ready-made beds" and new copper sheeting. He went on to announce that the vessel would do two round trips per week, one between Copenhagen and Aarhus, and the other alternating on the routes Copenhagen–Aalborg and Copenhagen–Fredericia. The Dania left London with Laurits Christensen as master on 17 June and arrived at Frederikshavn on the 21st. Christensen had been posted to the town—while it was still known as Fladstrand—during the Napoleonic Wars, and now he found the time to visit the place again and make his new steamship available for visits by local citizens.

Dania's first scheduled tour with passengers in Denmark came on Sunday 24 June 1827, between Toldboden in Copenhagen and the excursion site Bellevue on the Sound—in competition with the Caledonia—and the first trip across the Kattegat went to Aalborg on 30 June. On arrival at Aalborg, Christensen arranged an extra trip on the Limfjorden, giving the local citizens a chance to assess the ship. An ambitious advertising campaign was set up, comprising papers in Copenhagen as well as in numerous towns in Jutland. The advertisements laid out the sailing plan, with the ship going to Aarhus every Wednesday morning and heading back on Thursday evening, while the alternating trips to Aalborg and Fredericia would leave on Saturday and start the return trip on Monday evening. On the journey to Aalborg there was a stop at Hals, while the Fredericia route would anchor at Bogense. All trips included a stop at Helsingør. The trip to Aalborg was the most expensive, costing between 10 rigsbankdaler (Rbd.) on first class and 3 Rbd. for a place on the deck. Room on the deck was intended exclusively for "soldiers, sailors, peasants and servants". Time at sea was planned at 18 hours, "except for stormy weather". In the preceding years, the Royal Danish Postal Service had worked against the new faster passenger routes, out of fear that the travellers and employees would smuggle letters along, thereby undermining the business. But now the heads of the postal service decided that members of the public could mark their letters as intended for transportation to Jutland by steamship and this was made public in Statstidende on 16 July 1827. Illustrations of the Dania with a flag sporting the monogram of the Danish king, was a result of this arrangement, signifying a ship on official postal duty.

A few weeks later Christensen had to face the fact that his ambitious itinerary, with two return trips every week, was not sustainable in the long run. On the trip to and from Aalborg on 11 to 14 August, the Dania suffered so much in the storm that the journey to Aarhus on the 15th had to be cancelled "as both the machinery and the crew needed at couple of days' rest to get back in full shape". Based on that experience, Christensen soon cancelled all further trips to Aalborg, and from September Dania would only sail once a week, alternating between Aarhus and Fredericia. The route to Fredericia was enhanced with one more stop—besides Helsingør and Bogense—at Strib on Funen.

Dania had new owners on 28 January 1828 when it was taken over by a partnership led by the merchant Mathias Wilhelm Sass, who bought a third of the ship and became the shipping manager. The itinerary comprising alternate trips to Aarhus and Fredericia was continued, and the first journey in 1828 left Copenhagen for Aarhus on 5 May. From 1829 a new schedule was introduced, meaning that Dania called in at Aarhus every week and then continued to Strib and Fredericia. Same way back. In 1834 the machinery was refurbished at Frederiksværk Maskinfabrik, and Dania was ready for the summer season by June 1834. That year saw a new schedule, with the ship only making the return trip to Aarhus each week. In 1836 the manager M. W. Sass applied for an exclusive contract to take freight and passengers between Aarhus in Jutland and Kalundborg on Zealand. The route was already served by sailing ships, and Sass would take them over and add a steamship. He wanted to use the Dania, thereby giving up on the route between Aarhus and Copenhagen. He was granted a monopoly for 15 years, but had to promise to acquire a new vessel to relieve the Dania by 1840. The new paddle-wheel steamer, Christian VIII was built as promised in 1840. The ship got the machinery from the Dania and that spelled the end of her. She made her last scheduled trip in November 1839 and then went to Copenhagen, where the machinery was removed, and she was broken up in 1841.
