= PS Kingston =

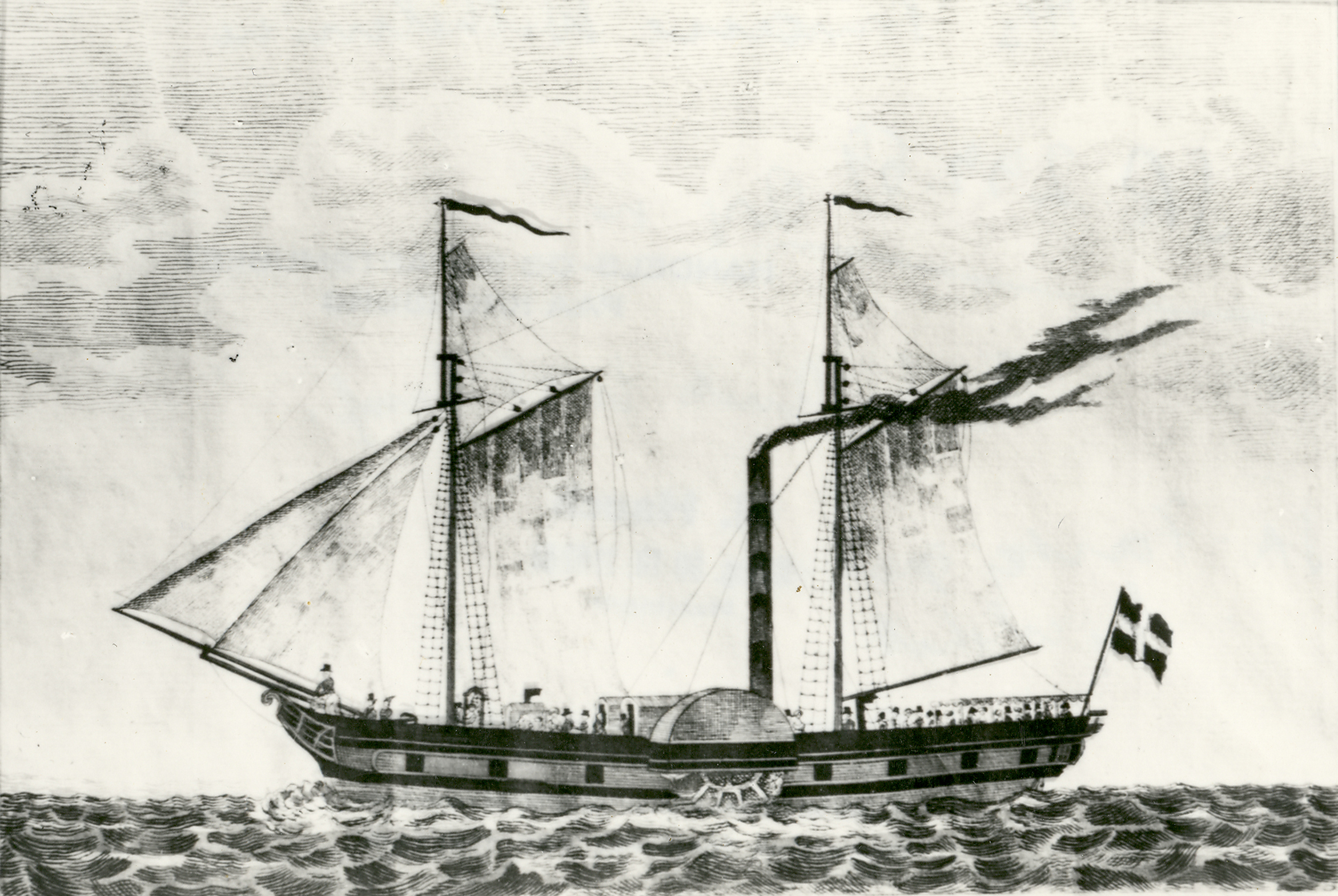
- The Kingston flying Danish colours post-1824

History
- Name: Kingston; Prindsesse Wilhelmine; Hydra; Maria Karolina
- Owner: 1821: Hull Steam Packet Company; 1824: Frederik August Hagen, København; 1833: Øresunds Toldkammers Fattigkasse, Helsingør; 1844: Jens Steffen Kaas, København; 1871: L. Cramér, Rone, Gotland
- Port of registry: (United Kingdom) Hull (1821–24); (Denmark) Copenhagen (1824-1833); (Denmark) Helsingør (1833-1844); (Denmark) Copenhagen (1844-1871); (Sweden) Rone, Gotland (1871-1877)
- Builder: Richard Pearson & Co., Thorne, United Kingdom.
- Completed: 1821
- Out of service: After 1877

General characteristics
- Tonnage: 147.8 gross register tons (GRT)
- Length: 115 ft (35 m)
- Beam: 22 ft (6.7 m)
- Draught: 6 ft (1.8 m)
- Propulsion: 1821: Steam engine from Overton & Smith, Hull at 60 nHP; 1838: Steam engine of 90 nHP from Maudslay, Sons & Field.; 1844: No machinery.
- Speed: 7.5 knots (normal speed)

Kingston was a paddle-wheel steamer, built in England in 1821. The ship was bought by Danish owners in 1824 and became the first steamship on the route between Copenhagen and Lübeck. In Denmark her name was changed to Prindsesse Wilhelmine, in honour of Princess Vilhelmine Marie of Denmark, youngest daughter of king Frederick VI. In 1844 the ship became a three masted schooner and it was broken up around 1877.

== Under British colours ==
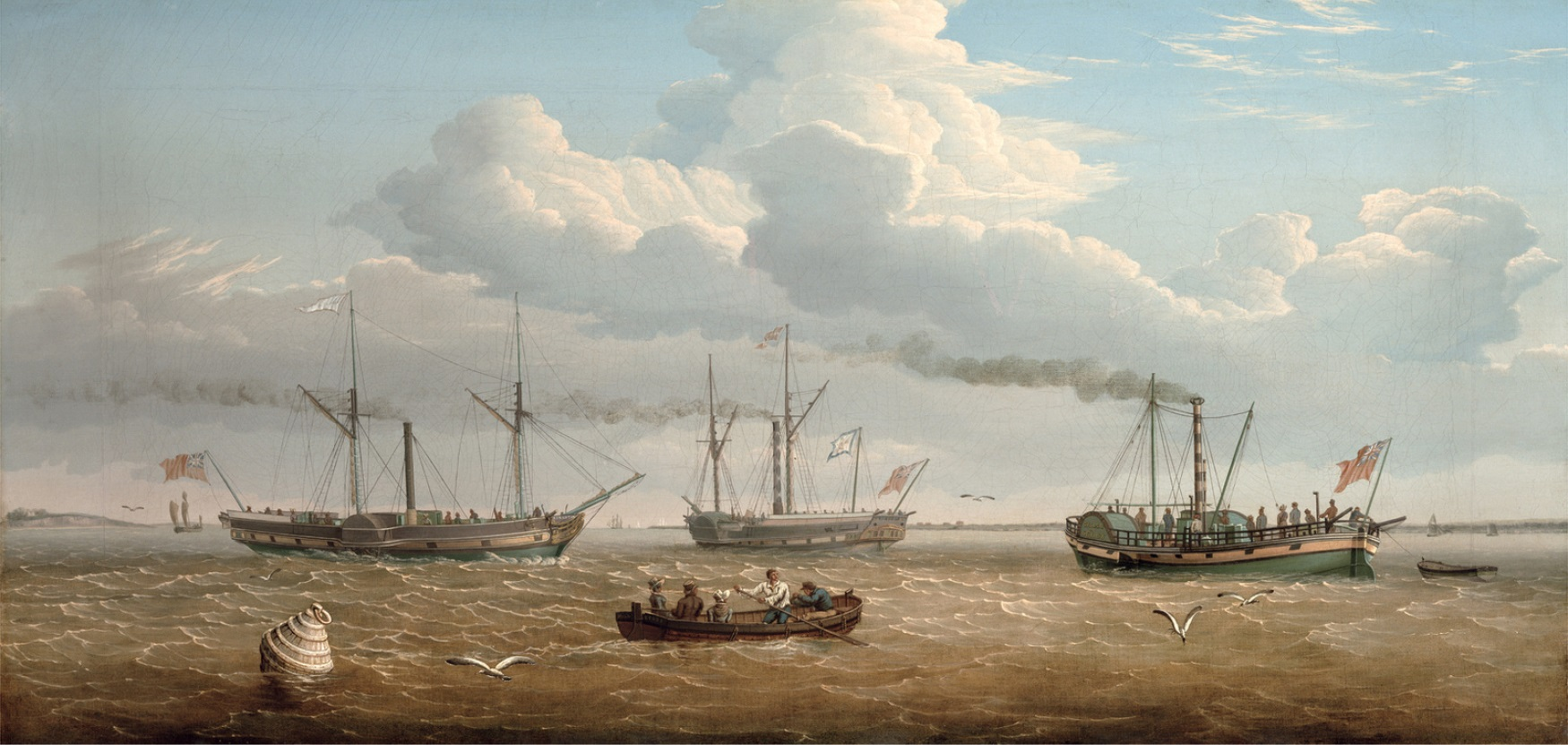
This painting by Thomas A. Binks from around 1823 shows Kingston to the left.

Kingston was built in 1821 as the first ship for The Hull Steam Packet Company. This shipping company was formed by investors from Thorne, situated at the River Don in South Yorkshire. Since 1816 the members had prospered from a steamship service between Thorne and Hull, and among them was the shipyard owner Richard Pearson, and he got the order for the Kingston. The new vessel was employed on the route between Hull and London, a 36-hour journey. For one Guinea you could get the cheapest space in the forecabin, while two guineas would buy you a better cabin and provisions on the journey. In 1822 and 1823 the company built two new ships, and the Kingston was no longer needed. Instead the vessel inaugurated a route to Antwerp in 1823.

The ship was measured a number of times - with different results - but weighed in around 120 tons. The machinery consisted of a single cylinder steam engine from Overton & Smith in Hull, giving 60 nominal horse power. This could be supplemented by the two masts carrying a schooner rig. Kingston's normal speed on steam was around 7.5 knots. The ship was built of oak with a single deck and with accommodation for 50-60 passengers.

== Under Danish colours ==
By 1822, the steamer Caledonia continued to be the only steamship allowed on the route between Copenhagen and Kiel in Holstein, at that time a part of the Danish kingdom. But her monopoly did not extend to the harbours east of Kiel, so the master Mathias Büring Lou applied for similar rights for a route between Copenhagen and Lübeck. The banker Frederik Hagen was the one pulling the strings and providing the money. Lou did not get his monopoly, but the following year the senate of Lübeck granted him exemption from pilot service on the river Trave and substantial reductions in levies for 10 years. At the Danish end Lou and Hagen were up against the Royal Danish Postal Service which feared a reduction in its profits from the inns and ferries along the traditional route across the Danish islands. To that was added a suspicion that passengers would "smuggle" mail on their journey, deriving the Mail of revenue. The political pressure from the Postal Service resulted in the reinstatement of a charter whereby passengers had to pay a levy for "loss of mail revenue", and the rules demanded a bureaucratic process at departure and arrival. In spite of these obstacles, Lou and Hagen persisted, and in March 1824 Hagen bought the Kingston for 5,000 £. The ship was given the new name Prindsesse Wilhelmine (also seen spelled without the "d"). The vessel did scheduled trips between Copenhagen and Lübeck, and like the Caledonia it was in Copenhagen every Sunday, making pleasure trips on the Sound. From 1830, the new Frederik den Sjette also called on Lübeck every week (as well as Kiel) and Prindsesse Wilhelmine continued her service until 1833, when the preferential treatment ended.

Prindsesse Wilhelmine was put up for sale in 1833, and quickly found a buyer. The business circles of Copenhagen were worried over the fact that the newly opened Göta Canal offered free steamship tug service, while those ships that chose the Sound (and paid Sound Dues) got no such service. That could move revenue to Sweden. And so it came to be that Prindsesse Wilhelmine was bought for 12,000 rigsdaler by Øresunds Toldkammers Fattigkasse, which was a pension fund holding a convenient amount of cash. The machinery of the vessel seemed not quite adequate for the task, and after some years of discussions the pension fund had to pay for a new machinery in 1838. That year the steamer made its most famous tugging, taking the Danish naval frigate Rota - with Bertel Thorvaldsen and many of his works travelling from Italy - from Helsingør to a large crowd gathered in Copenhagen. In 1844 came the end of Prindsesse Wilhelmine's career as a steamship. General-Toldkammeret (Customs Department) and Kommercekollegiet sponsored the steamer Hertha, and the expensive machinery was moved to the new vessel.

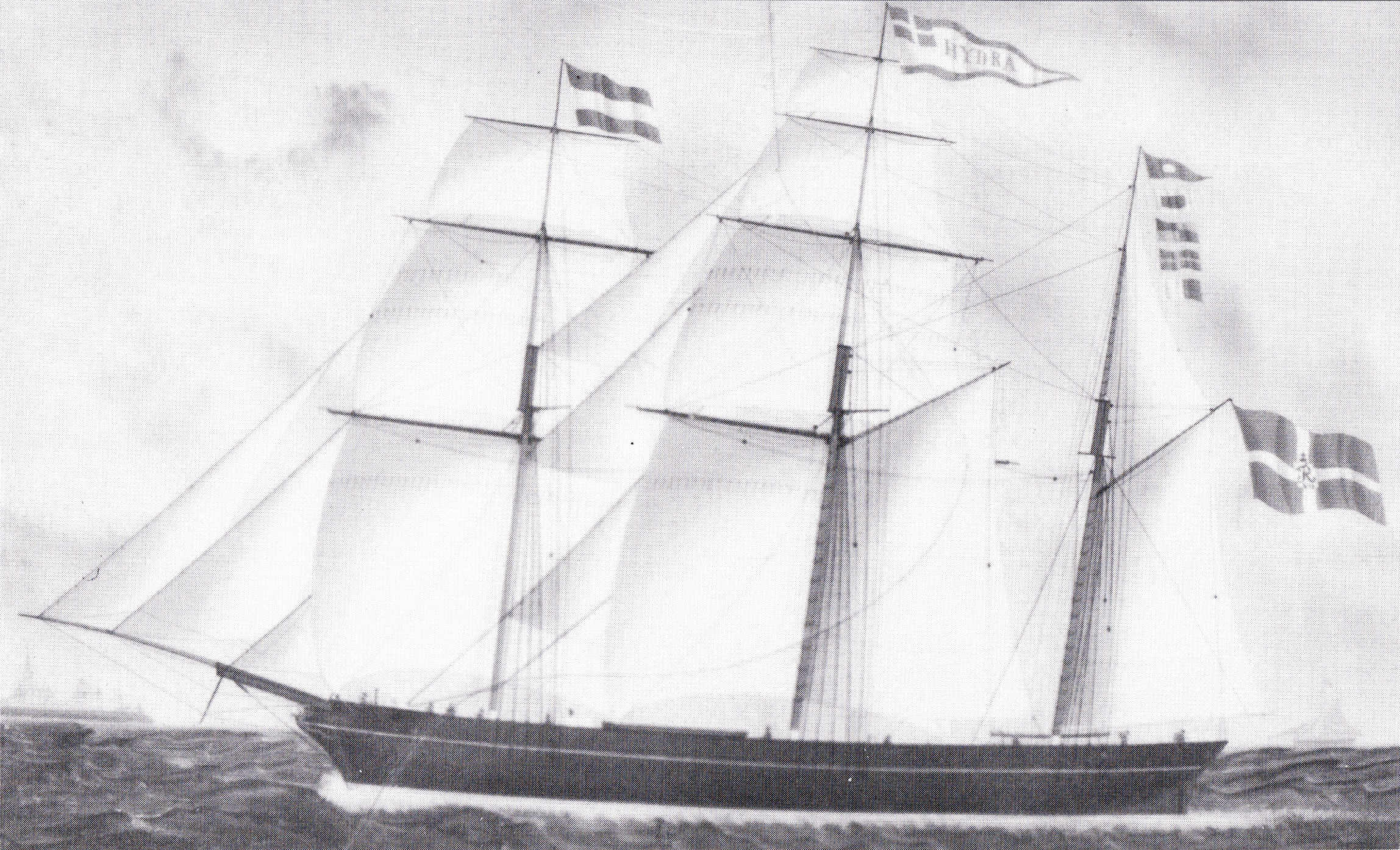
portrait of the Hydra from 1861. Not much resemblance to the original paddle steamer.

The former steamer was bought in November 1844 (for 1,220 rdl) by the shipyard owner Jens Steffen Kaas of Copenhagen. By 1845 he had her rebuilt as a three masted schooner (or barque) with the name Hydra, used for overseas trade. Hydra had new owners in 1863 and again in 1869, but in March 1870 she foundered in Mariager Fjord. The wreck was sold to A. Nielsen of Odder, who repaired her and sold her to Swedish owners in October 1870. Between 1871 and 1877 she was owned by L. Cramér of Rone, Gotland as the Maria Karolina, and after that there is no mention of her in the ships' lists.
