= Jacob Holm (industrialist) =

Danish industrialist, ship owner and merchant

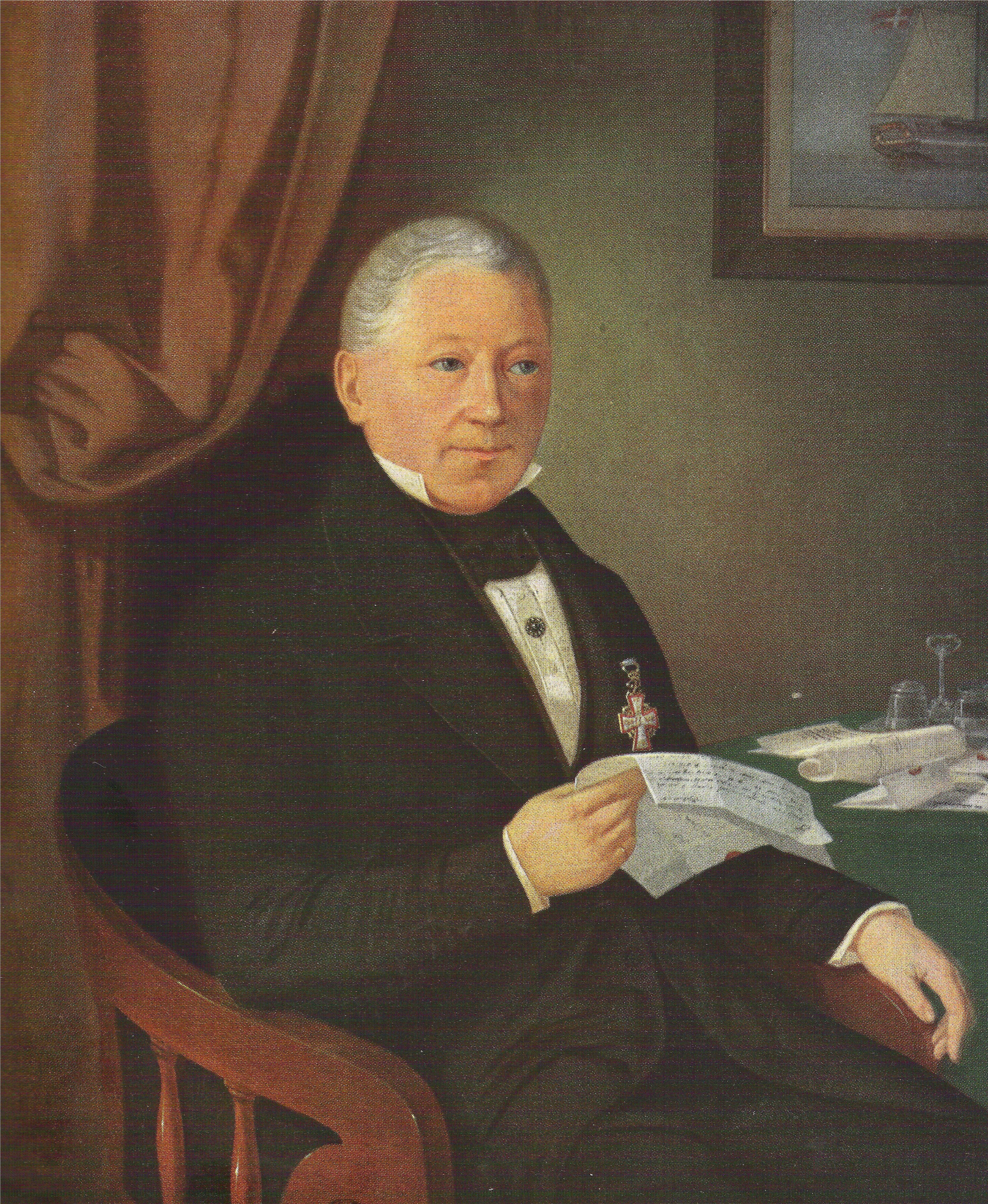
- Jacob Holm painted in 1834
- Born: 29 September 1770; Skafterup, Denmark
- Died: 3 August 1845 (aged 74); Copenhagen, Denmark
- Occupations: Industrialist, merchant, ship owner, ship builder
- Awards: Grand Cross of the Dannebrog

Jacob Holm (29 September 1770 – 3 August 1845) was a Danish industrialist, ship owner and merchant. He founded the company Jacob Holm & Sønner, which still exists today.

== Early life ==
Jacob Holm was born at Skafterup in the south of Zealand in 1770 as the youngest of four brothers. He grew up in poverty with his mother, after his father, who was a school master, died when he was just four years old. After serving his apprenticeship in Næstved, he moved to Copenhagen in 1790 where he worked for one of his brothers.

== Grocer and industrialist ==
In 1794, on Christmas Day, he opened a grocer's store in Torvegade at Christianshavn, servicing the fast-growing population of Amager, and soon also engaged in a profitable trade with the Danish provinces. After some years in business he saw the advantages in having his own production of some of the goods he sold. In 1805 he constructed an oil mill at Christianshavn and from 1808 to 1811 acquired several smaller lots along Amager Road where he set up various factories, producing glue, candles, oil, starch, powder and ship sails. In 1811, he established a rope walk which became the first industrialized production of rope in Denmark.

== Shipping ==
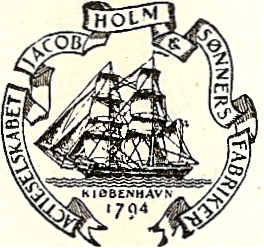
Jacob Holm & Sønner, founded 1794

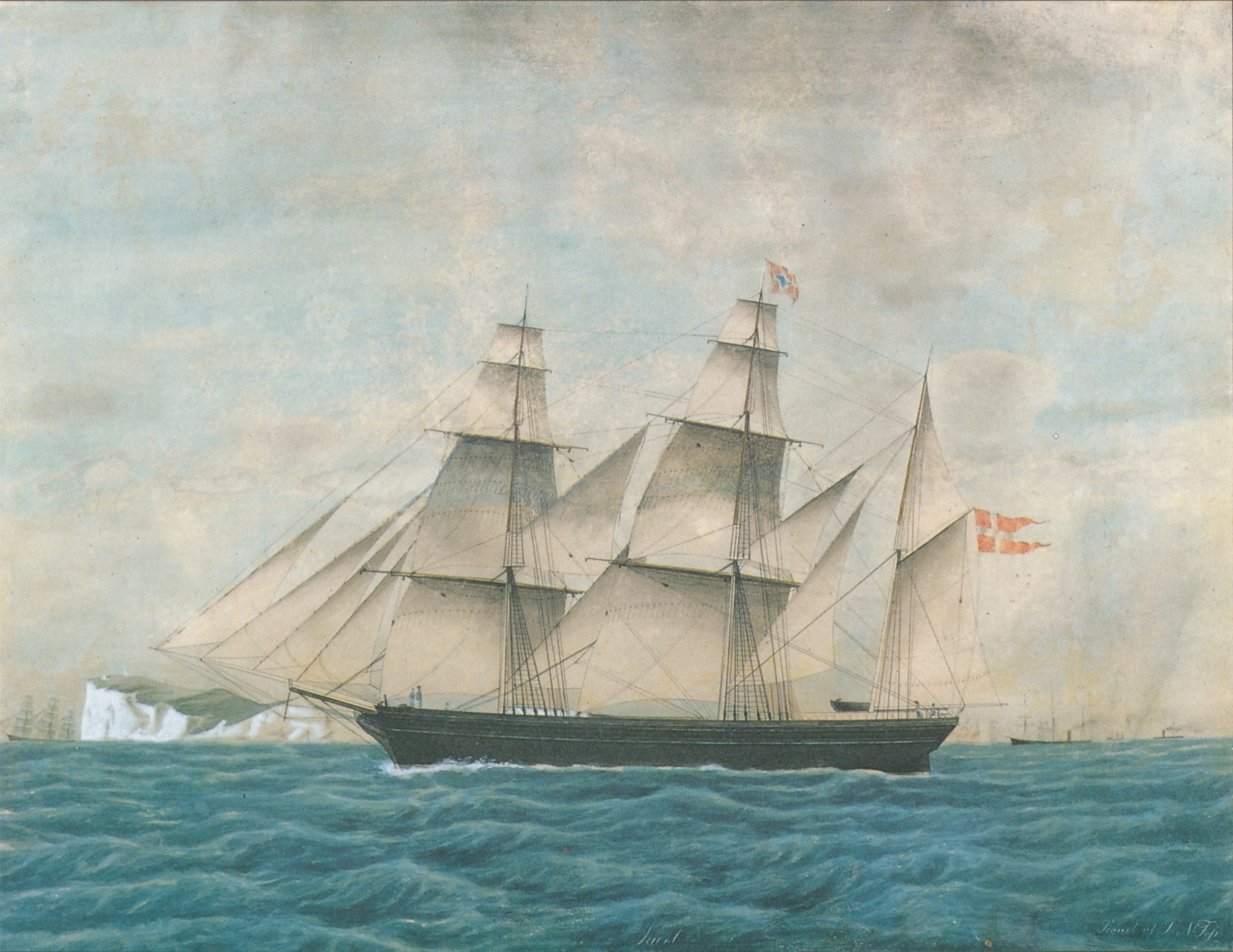
Jacob of Copenhagen, one of Jacob Holm & Søn's ships

Already in 1798 Holm had bought his first ship, Najaden. The years after the turn of the century were hard on the shipping industry with the British bombardments of Copenhagen in 1801 and 1807 but his company survived.

He owned more than a hundred ships during the period from 1807 until his death in 1845 and for a while his shipping business was the largest in the country. In 1840, his fleet consisted of five barques, nine brigs, two schooners and two koffs. His ships brought blubber back from Greenland, which was processed in his factories, and also sailed to Danish India and the Danish West Indies.

His ships Concordia and Neptun were the first Danish ships to sail around the world, completing three such voyages between 1839 and 1845. Concordia was the first Danish whaling expedition to the Southern Ocean.

== Shipbuilding ==
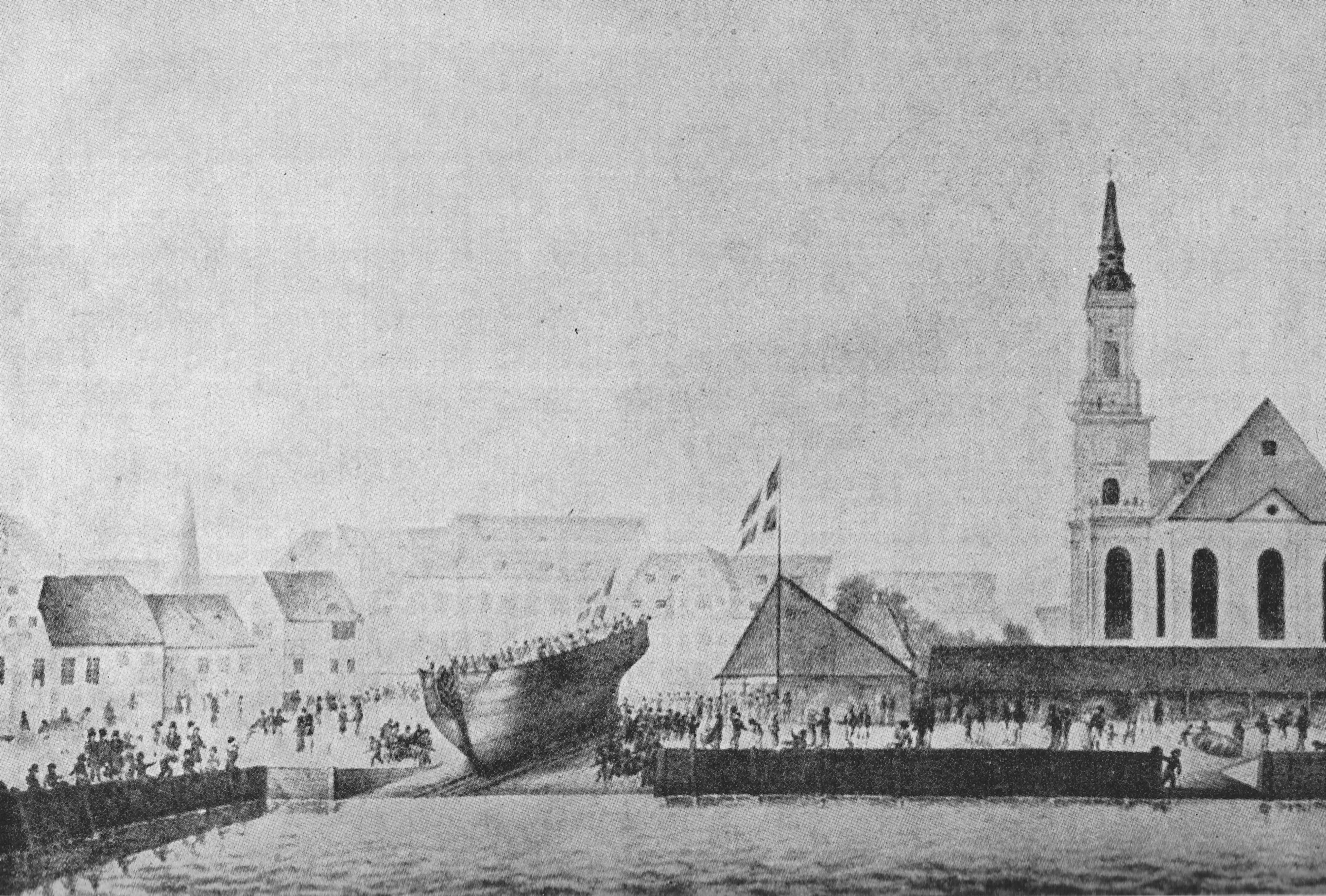
Jacob Holm's shipyard

In 1814, Holm established a shipyard at Wilders Plads which he had obtained on a lease.

He also purchased several other sites in Copenhagen harbour, including Applebys Plads (1833), Danish Asia Company's site (1841) and Larsens Plads (1844). The latter site was used for repairing ships.

In 1830, he constructed the first Danish-built steam vessel, Frederik VI, which succeeded Caledonia on Kiel-Lübeck.

== Other pursuits and legacy ==
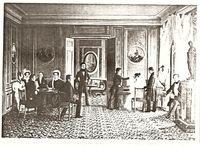
Interior

Jacob Holm was a member of the Council of 32 Men which marked all of his participation in public life. He built the first example of workers housing in Denmark at Applebyes Plads – known as Holm's Houses – which were demolished in the 1950s. He is buried at Christian's Church in Christianshavn.

The company Jacob Holm Industries is today headquartered in Switzerland. His former rope factory has been converted into the Amager [shopping] Centre. Some of the surrounding streets commemorate its industrial past and Holm personally, such as Reberbanegade ("Rope walk street"), Tovværksgade ("Rope Street") and Jacob Holms Gade ("Jacob Holm's Street").
