= PS Caledonia (1815) =

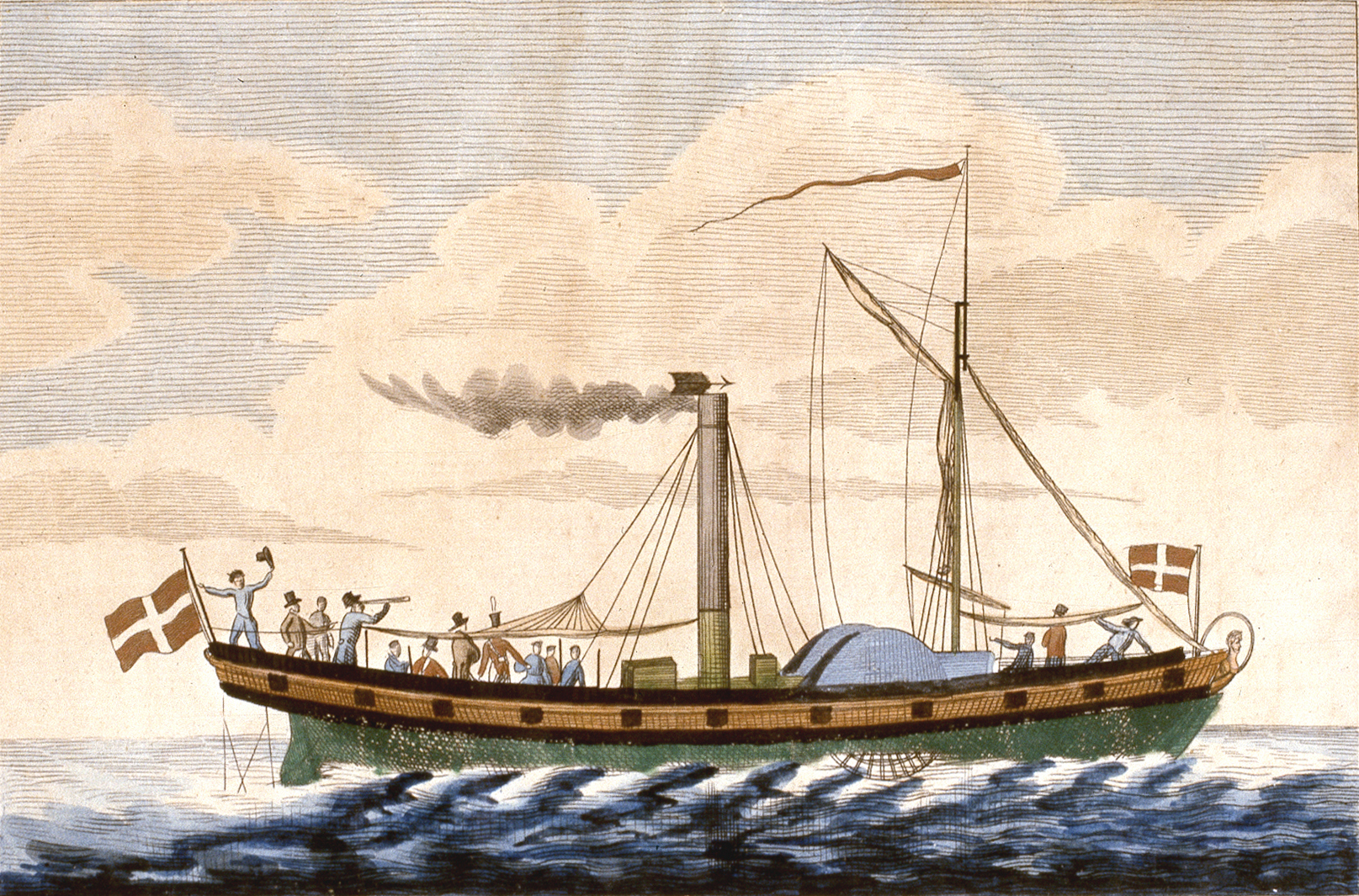
- Caledonia under Danish registry after 1819

History

United Kingdom
- Name: Caledonia
- Launched: 27 April 1815

General characteristics
- Type: paddle steamer
- Tons burthen: 102
- Length: 86 ft (26 m)
- Beam: 13 ft (4.0 m)

Caledonia was a paddle steamer built in Scotland in 1815. The ship was bought by a Danish businessman in 1819 and it became the first steamship registered in Denmark. It spent most of its active years in Denmark operating between the cities of Copenhagen and Kiel. Broken up around 1843.

== Under British registry ==
Caledonia was launched on 27 April 1815 at John Wood & Co. in Port Glasgow, near Glasgow. She had two steam engines, supplied by the Greenhead Foundry Company in Glasgow. The combined engine power was 36 nominal hp, corresponding to between 100 and 180 indicated hp. The original speed of the ship was between 6 and 8 knots. Caledonia was the largest steamer built on the Clyde at the time and only one of the earlier ships had used the system with two engines. The registration papers from July 1816 listed a number of owners, cooperating via the Caledonia Steam Boat Company. Caledonia was initially used on the route between Glasgow and Helensburgh. The sources describing the vessel differ somewhat, especially regarding her size, engines and speed. In July 1816, Caledonia embarked on the long journey from Glasgow to the Thames, where the vessel was employed on a service between London and Margate.

In May 1817 Caledonia was bought by James Watt Jr (nephew of the inventor James Watt) and Matthew Robinson Boulton (son of Matthew Boulton). The new owners worked together as second generation of the engine factory of Boulton and Watt and they had plans to add ship engines to their production in Birmingham at Soho Manufactory. Watts and Boulton gradually replaced the machinery with their own products, and in order to test the endurance they took Caledonia on a trip to Rotterdam and up the Rhine. The sidewheeler Defiance had gone as far as Cologne in June 1816, and Caledonia reached Koblenz in November 1817. It had, however, been necessary to use draft horses on the final part, and when the owners asked the Kingdom of Prussia for a concession for a regular service, their request was refused. Caledonia spent the winter at Rotterdam, and more machine parts were delivered from England for installation. In the spring of 1818, the sidewheeler was back on the Thames, and James Watt Junior continued his experiments, among other things varying the number of paddles on each wheel. While this was happening, the Danish solicitor, and later diplomat, Steen Andersen Bille (1781-1860), had petitioned the Danish King for the exclusive concession for a steamship connection between Copenhagen and Kiel in Holstein (then a part of the Danish Monarchy). There were two other applicants for the concession, but both withdrew, and in October 1818 Bille's concession was confirmed. He wanted to buy Caledonia, but at the time he worked as an administrator in the Danish West Indies, so the bankers Hambro and Son in Copenhagen (later Hambros Bank in London) took care of the purchase. Steen Bille's brother, the naval officer Michael Bille travelled to England, where he took over Caledonia and led the ship to Denmark by the Eider Canal.

== Under Danish registry ==
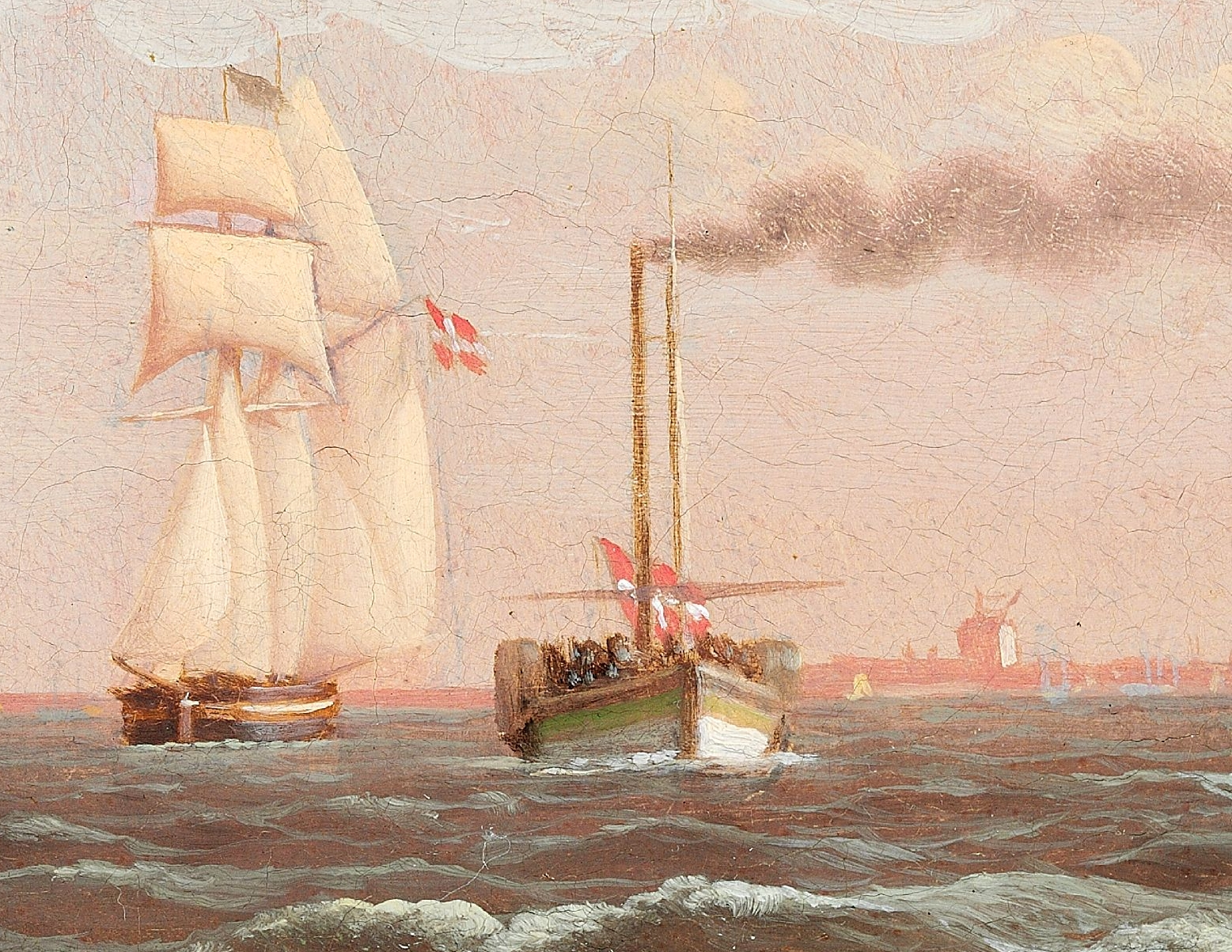
Caledonia spent every Sunday in Copenhagen and used the day for scheduled pleasure cruises on the Sound. Detail from an 1824 painting by C.W. Eckersberg.

The ship's arrival at Copenhagen in May 1819 attracted considerable attention. The owners started advertising at once, and an 1819 advertisement said, that Caledonia "departs Copenhagen for Kiel every Tuesday morning at precisely 5 and calls in (to receive or embark passengers) at Coster's Ferrypoint on Møn at 2 in the afternoon, Gaabense Ferrypoint on Falster at 4 in the afternoon, Banholm on Lolland at 6 in the afternoon and is then expected to arrive at Kiel on Wednesday morning at 8." The route was only operated during the summer season and Caledonia made 14 round trips in 1819 and 22 in 1820. The low number in 1819 was partly due to lack of passengers - there was a lot of mistrust against the use of steam - so every other week the ship stayed in Copenhagen and small excursions were sailed from the city. This provided more passengers, especially after the King and Queen had tried it. In January 1822, Steen Bille sold the ship and the concession to the merchant Lauritz Nicolai Hvidt.

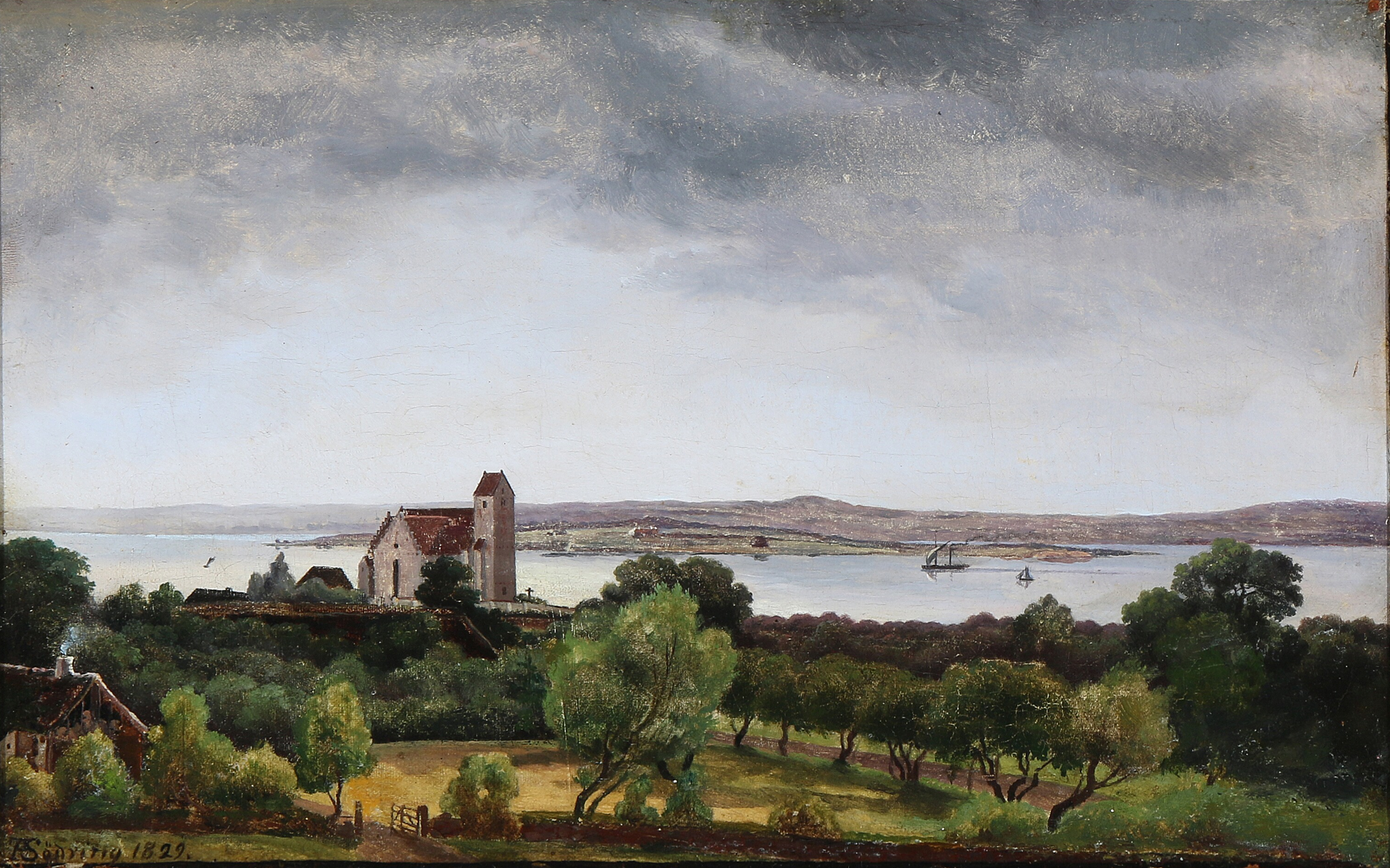
Steamships were very rare in Denmark in the 1820s, so it is most certainly Caledonia in the sound between Zealand and Møn, in this 1829 painting by Frederik Sødring.

Spells of bad weather would jeopardise the timetable. That happened for instance to Hans Christian Andersen, who set out on June 30, 1829 from Copenhagen to Møn. In a letter to Edvard Collin he gave an account of the journey with Caledonia:

"The sea journey was very unlucky, although now that it is over, it does amuse me. We had a bit of a storm and had to work our way through black and foam-white waves. Everybody got ill; Mrs. Bülow thought we were going to founder, and I - You know I have no trace of valour - I lay wrapped in a blanket on the deck, staring with a pale face at the grey skies that emptied themselves over us. - At last the captain announced that we would have to stay out at sea the entire night; a comforting outlook. Only the following morning did we arrive at Koster, where everything was in a state of commotion, because the King was due to arrive."

The ship was fitted with tarpaulins fore and aft, giving cover to the passengers. Below deck there was a special cabin for ladies, a larger cabin for other passengers and a pantry where the heat from the engines was used for cooking. Extra payment would give access to one of eight cabins, where passengers could sleep during the trip.

The satirical magazines wrote about the Caledonia sickness, which was due to the fact that the steam driven ship did not have sails to catch the wind and stabilise the movement in the water, and popular slang named the vessel "Plaske-Marlene (Splashing Marlene)".

After 12 seasons of service, Caledonia was replaced in 1830 by the larger Frederik den Sjette. The importance of the Copenhagen-Kiel connection was further enhanced in 1832, when the railroad from Altona to Kiel was completed. The paddle-steamer was still used occasionally, and could be found in the advertised itiniaries until 1834, but after that she went unmentioned until Hvidt informed the authorities that she had been scrapped - in either 1841 or 1843. Caledonia proved to be an excellent investment for L.N. Hvidt. The museum director Knud Klem went through the books and established that Hvidt made around 43,000 Danish rigsdaler from her.

== See also ==
List of steamships of Denmark
