= HNLMS Amstelstroom =

World War II Dutch submarine tender

History

Netherlands
- Name: Amstelstroom
- Builder: C. van de Giessen & Zoon, Krimpen aan de IJssel
- Laid down: 1935
- Launched: 1936
- Commissioned: 11 May 1940 Royal Netherlands Navy
- Out of service: 24 September 1940 Royal Netherlands Navy
- Fate: Returned to owner 25 September 1940

General characteristics
- Type: Submarine tender
- Displacement: 395 t (389 long tons) standard
- Length: 56.54 m (185 ft 6 in)
- Beam: 8.99 m (29 ft 6 in)
- Draught: 1.8 m (5 ft 11 in)
- Installed power: 750 hp (560 kW)
- Propulsion: 1 × Werkspoor diesel engine
- Speed: 12 knots (22 km/h; 14 mph)

HNLMS Amstelstroom was originally a coastal transport vessel of the Hollandsche Stoomboot Mij. of Amsterdam. The ship was requisitioned by the Royal Netherlands Navy after the start of the German invasion of the Netherlands to serve as a makeshift submarine tender.

== Service history ==
The coastal transport ship Amstelstroom was requisitioned on 11 May 1940, one day after the start of World War II for the Netherlands together with other civilian ships. The Royal Netherlands Navy foresaw the need of additional submarine tenders in Dutch waters as the only other such ship was HNLMS Mercuur, causing them to requisition some ships such as Amstelstroom and Mulan.

HNLMS Amstelstroom was initially be used to transport torpedoes, ammunition and other spare parts for maintaining Royal Netherlands Navy ships from Amsterdam to Portsmouth. Once the Netherlands had fallen, the ship served alongside HNLMS Mulan as a submarine tender at Dundee, Scotland, before being returned to its owner on 25 September 1940. The ship survived the war and continued its transport role until its eventual retirement.
