= General Steam Navigation Company =

London based shipping company

- House flag
- Industry: Transport
- Founded: 1824
- Defunct: 1972
- Fate: Acquired by P&O
- Successors: P&O
- Headquarters: London, England
- Products: Cargo services, Thames pleasure cruises

The General Steam Navigation Company (GSN), incorporated in 1824, was London's foremost short sea shipping line for almost 150 years. It was the oldest shipping company in the world to begin business with seagoing steam vessels.

== Foundation ==
=== Context ===
In 1815, the first steam shipping line on the Thames was started. The paddle steamer Marjory, serviced a line between London and Gravesend. Many more steamboats followed, and the lines were soon extended to Margate. At the time both places were already popular tourist destinations. At the time, the brothers Thomas and John Brocklebank, were traders in timber and had a shipyard at Deptford Creek.

=== The Ramsgate and Broadstairs Steam Packet Company ===
In about 1821, Thomas Brocklebank arrived at Margate on the first steamboat to ply that route. On disembarking the local authorities charged him 2s 6d for himself and 2s 6d for his hand baggage. This was the equivalent of about a week's income for an average salary. Brocklebank immediately saw a business opportunity and decided to convert one of the barges he had on the stocks to a steamboat. He ordered engines and soon launched her as Eagle Packet. She was used for a route between London and Ramsgate, where people could disembark without charges.

Brocklebank built some more vessels, and formed the Ramsgate and Broadstairs Steam Packet Company. This company had shares dated 29 April 1822. It employed Brocklebank's Thames paddle steamer Eagle on the route between London and Ramsgate. In 1822 Brocklebank built the slightly larger Royal Sovereign for the same route. In 1824 the City of London was built. In May 1824 Brocklebank sold the Eagle.

== Early years (1825-1850) ==
=== Foundation and first years ===
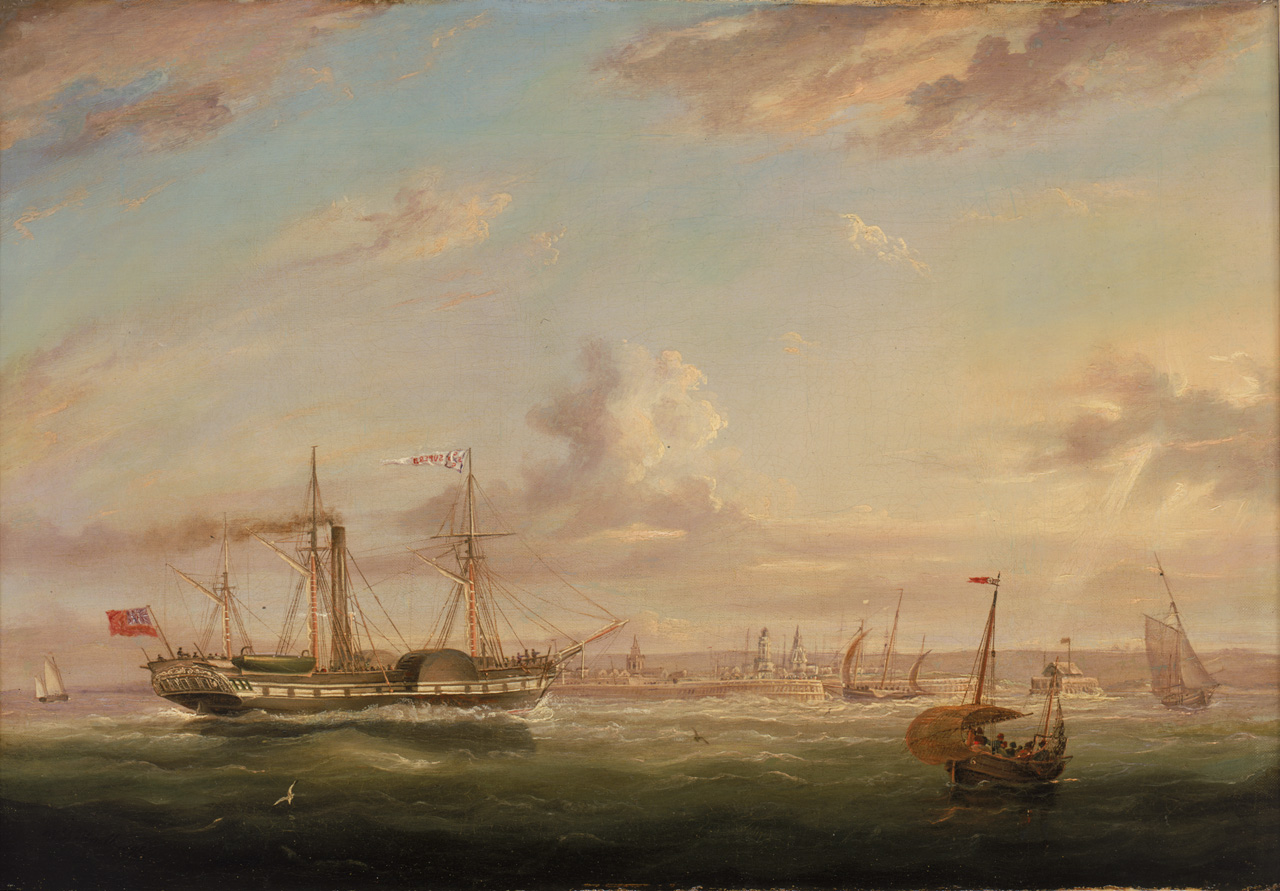
SS Superb in 1825

The initiative to form the General Steam Navigation Company came from William J. Hall and Thomas Brocklebank. On 11 June 1824 a contract was signed to found the company. It had a large nominal capital of £2 million in £100 shares, but the first installment was only two pounds 10 shillings, and would never exceed £15. The company had a wide ranging vision of establishing steam lines across the globe, but also wanted to station steam vessels for towing at multiple places on the British coast.

GSN's first board had 18 members. Amongst these were the Calais shipping line owners William Jolliffe and Sir Edward Banks, the wharfinger William J. Hall, and the Ramsgate shipping line owner Thomas Brocklebank. Mr. Matthias Attwood MP was the first chairman. He would be succeeded by his son Matthias Wolverley Attwood (1808-1865). (Matthias Attwood should not be confused with his younger brother the MP and banker Thomas Attwood. Others have that Sir Joseph Banks and Thomas Brocklebank would only later become the managing director.

When the company was established, it immediately acquired four existing steamers for lines to Hull and Ramsgate. It then ordered six more for lines to Yarmouth, Ostend, Brighton and Dieppe. The tonnage of these ships was about 240, with 40 hp. In 1825 a new line from London to Leith was added, serviced by the United Kingdom of 160 feet. In 1825 the GSN operated 14 steam vessels on lines from London. Many of the ships in this overview can be identified with ships in an 1822 overview of early steam vessels.

The overview illustrates how the company's operations started. In 1824, Jolliffe, Banks, and Brocklebank brought in their four steam vessels. The board then carefully placed orders for six new ships: four built by Everden at Deptford on land leased from Brocklebank, and two by Wallis at Blackwall. In 1825 however, many existing ships were hastily bought after little prior inspection. In 1826 GSN faced a financial crisis. Only about half of its fleet was actually employed, and not all of these permanently. Many of the second hand ships which had been bought required extensive repairs, and the ships that had been ordered cost a lot of money before they generated revenue.

General Steam Navigation Company Act 1831
- Act of Parliament
- Parliament of the United Kingdom
- Long title: An Act for granting certain Powers to a Company called "The General Steam Navigation Company."
- Citation: 1 & 2 Will. 4. c. liii

Dates
- Royal assent: 23 August 1831
Other legislation
Repealed by	General Steam Navigation Company Act 1874

Status: Repealed

Text of statute as originally enacted

Some shareholders were worried by the continued calls for additional funding, and in March 1827 they reacted by attempting to dissolve the company. This did not succeed, but in the autumn, the three executive directors who had been in charge up till then were replaced by three committees. The change led to tighter procedures and better accounting, and the company becoming profitable. In 1831 Parliament granted limited liability via the General Steam Navigation Company Act 1831 (1 & 2 Will. 4. c. liii), and incorporation followed in 1834.

First ships of the General Steam Navigation Company
Ship	Built	Tonnage	Shipyard	Engines	In 1822	Note
Lord Melville	1822	136 / 220	Jolliffe, Banks & Co.	2 * 40 hp Butterly	London - Calais	Jolliffe & Banks
Earl of Liverpool	1823	131			N/a	Jolliffe & Banks
Royal Sovereign	1822	135 / 220	Brocklebank, Deptford	2 * 40 hp Butterly	London - Ramsgate	Brocklebank's Ramsgate line
City of London	1824	146	Deptford		N/a	Brocklebank's Ramsgate line
Superb	1820	155 / 246	Scotts	2 * 35 hp Napier	Liverpool - Greenock	
Mountaineer	1821	118 / 190	Cornwallis, Greenock	2 * 35 hp Napier	Liverpool - Dublin	
Belfast	1820	132 / 190	Ritchie & Co., Belfast	2 * 35 hp Napier	Liverpool - Dublin	
Talbot	1819	77 / 156	Wood & Co., Glasgow	2 * 30 hp Napier	London - Calais	
Waterloo	1819	134 / 210	Scotts, Glasgow	2 * 30 hp, Cook	London - Calais	
Rapid	1822	84 / 140	Cornwallis, Greenock	2 * 30 hp Napier	London - Rotterdam	
Eclipse	1819	87 / 190	Brent, Rotherhithe	2 * 30 hp Boulton & Watt	London - Margate	
Hylton Joliffe	1825	174 / 300	Scotts	80 hp Scott, Greenock	N/a	ex-Trinacria
Brocklebank		111				
Attwood		143				

=== Early shipping lines ===
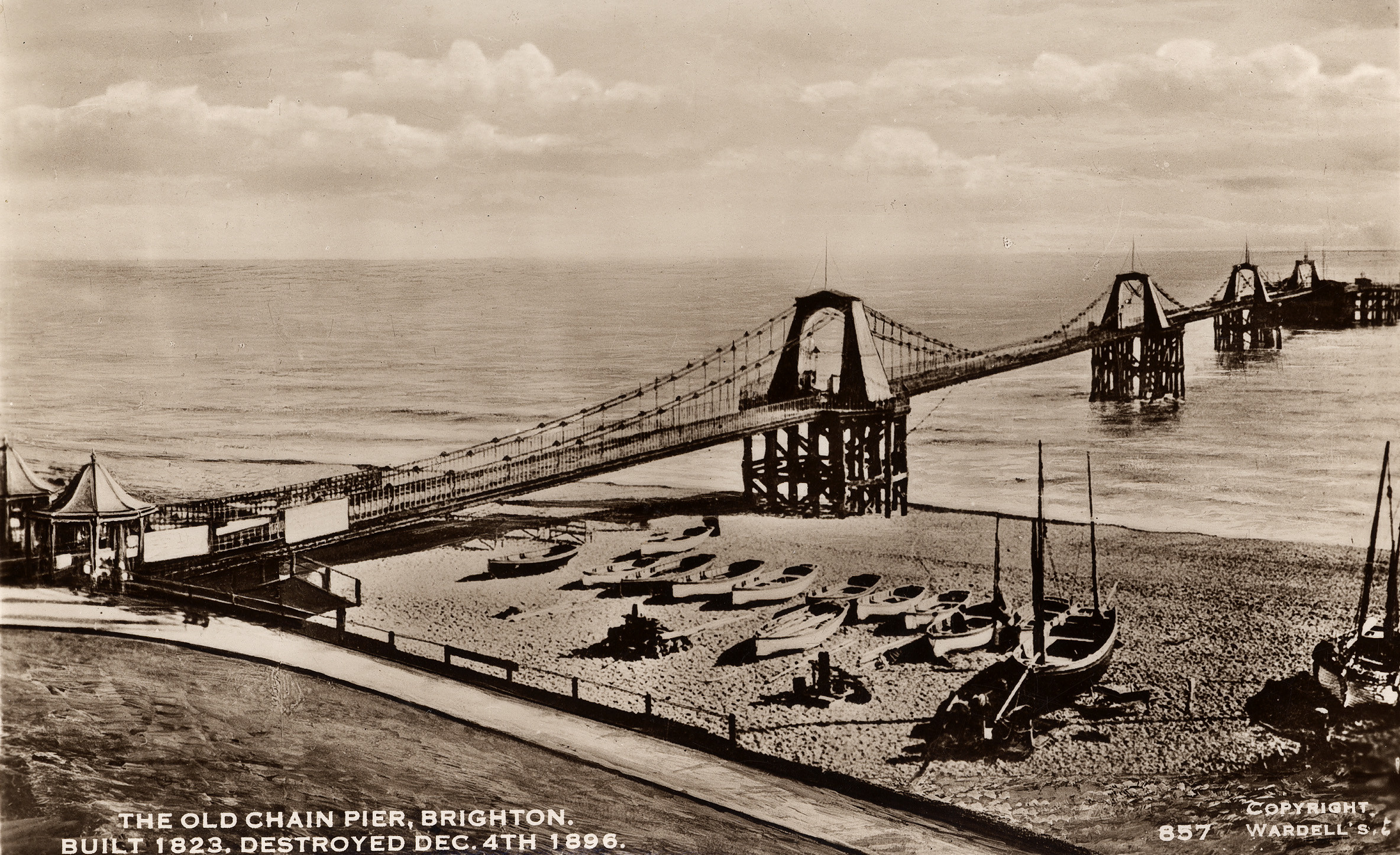
The old Brighton Pier

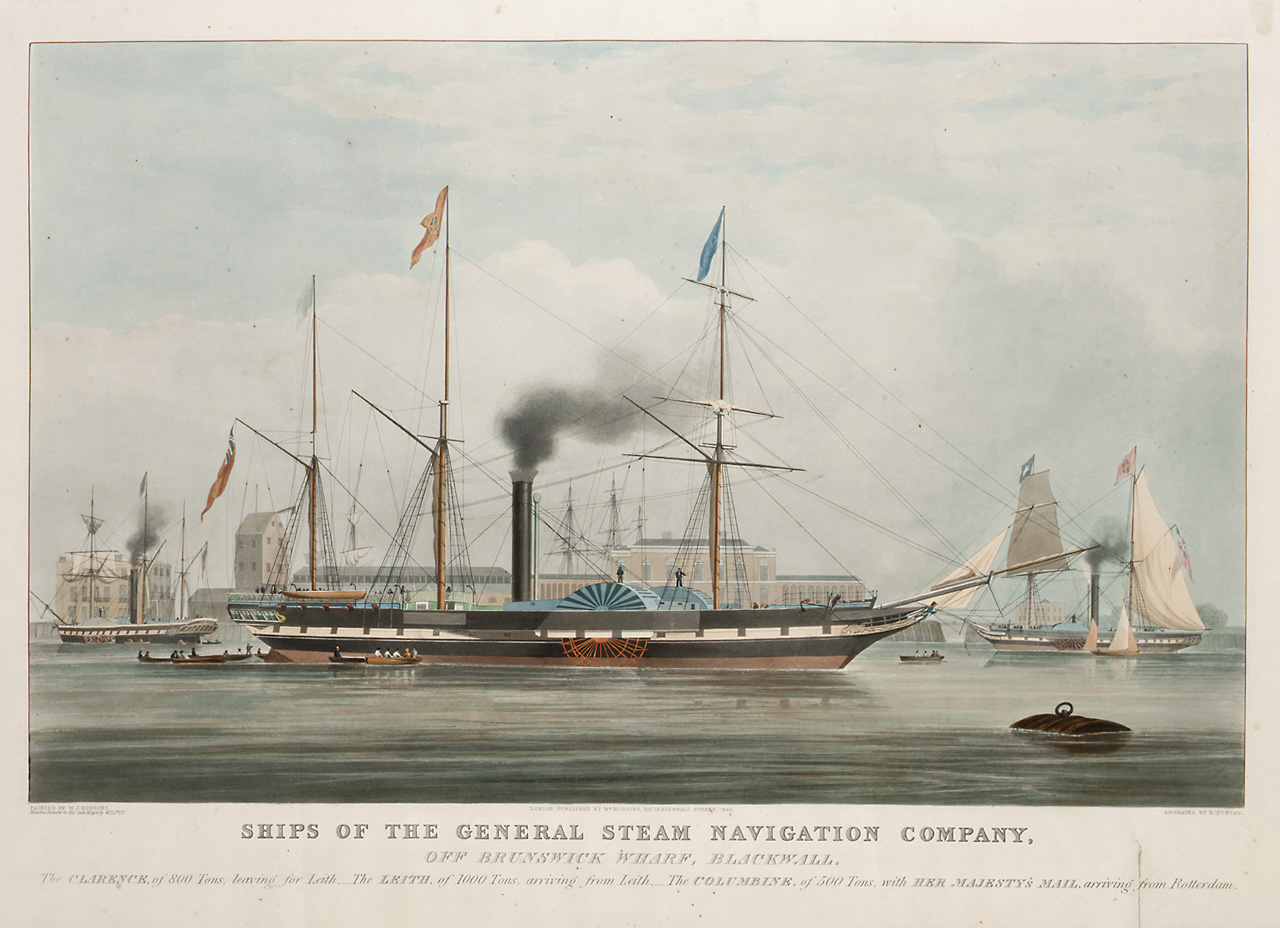
GSN ships off Brunswick Wharf, Blackwall in 1840

In 1826 GSN had eight shipping lines:

- London to Ramsgate and Margate
- London to Calais: Attwood, Lord Melville
- London to Lisbon. Vigo, Porto and Gibraltar: George IV, Duke of York
- London to Boulogne: Rapid
- London to Ostend: Earl of Liverpool, Mountaineer
- London to Rotterdam: Belfast
- London to Hamburg: Sir Edward Banks, Hylton Jolliffe
- Brighton to Dieppe: Eclipse, Brocklebank, Talbot.

The line to Ramsgate and Margate had been Brocklebank's Ramsgate and Broadstairs Steam Packet Company, that was continued by GSN. In order to limit competition GSN made an agreement with the Margate company, in which Sir Robert Banks had an interest. In 1831 the "New Margate Company" reintroduced competition, but also led to a new agreement. By 1838 the Margate Company had been bought by GSN, which continued a service to Ramsgate. It left Margate to the "New Margate Company" in exchange for 9d for each Margate passenger in Summer. In 1849 GSN would buy the "New Margate Company"'s vessels.

The line to Calais had been inherited the line to Calais with the Lord Melville and the Earl of Liverpool. It then bought the Rapid, so it could use the Earl of Liverpool for a new line to Ostend.

The line to Lisbon, Vigo, Porto and Gibraltar was part of plans to establish a London - Cádiz and a London - Saint Petersburg line. These obviously required bigger ships. George IV and Duke of York measured between 500 and 600 tons burthen, and had 130 hp engines. These were a technological success, proving they were able to withstand the storms in the Bay of Biscay and the Baltic Sea. However, the shareholders were not happy with these lines. In March 1827 they agreed to sell the ships to the executives Banks and Jolliffe at a huge loss. By August 1827 the George IV and Duke of York had indeed been sold.

The first line from London to Rotterdam had been opened by the Rapid of captain Smith in July 1822. In August 1822, the "London and Rotterdam Steam Packet Company" started to operate on the same route and immediately came to an agreement on a schedule with the owners of the Rapid. Its first ship was the King of the Netherlands. The Rapid continued on this line throughout 1823, but then seems to have left. In April 1825 the Queen of the Netherlands joined the King of the Netherlands. In 1826 GSN started to compete by employing the Belfast, which connected to the Rhine steamboats of the Nederlandsche Stoomboot Maatschappij (NSM), which was important for tourism. GSN and the "London and Rotterdam Steam Packet Company" soon entered into an agreement about freight rates and services. However, in April 1830 the NSM started to compete by commissioning the big De Batavier. That same year, the "London and Rotterdam Steam Packet Company" sold the Queen of the Netherlands to GSN. In August 1831, the King of the Netherlands also left the London to Rotterdam line. At the end of the 1820s GSN started to operate a freight business. The import of live cattle and sheep from Rotterdam became very important.

The line to Hamburg was started with the Hylton Jolliffe in June 1825. In 1831 the Post Office tendered a contract for the mail from London to Hamburg. It was awarded to the St George Steam Packet Company for £13,350. Within a few months, St. George's transferred the contract to GSN, and when it had to be renewed two years later, there was only a single offer by GSN for £17,000. It was widely believed that GSN achieved both the transfer and the single offer by paying about £2,000 a year to its competitor.

The line from Brighton to Dieppe provided a short route from London to Paris at a time that there were no railways from Paris to the coast. It would occasionally start and end at Newhaven, i.e. when it was not safe to land at Brighton. The local competitor the "Brighton and Dieppe Steam Packet Company" employed the Quentin Durward, and had better use of the Brighton Pier. After fierce competition, the competitors came to an agreement, and published a common schedule and fare for two GSN ships and one "Brighton and Dieppe" ship.

=== Acquisition of the London and Edinburgh Steam Packet Company ===
In 1836 GSN entered the coasting trade by acquiring the "London and Edinburgh Steam Packet Company". The London and Edinburgh had begun a London to Leith service in 1821. Its first ship was the City of Edinburgh of 420 ton burthen. The second ship was the James Watt (Note: The James Watt, built by Clydeside shipbuilder John Wood and launched on 20 June 1821, acquired by the GSN in 1836.) Soho of 510 ton burthen and 120 hp was launched in July 1823. The smaller Tourist of 1821, also belonged to this company. The data of these ships shows that they were generally bigger than the early GSN ships.

=== Facilities in London ===
In 1827 the GSN decided to start its own engineering workshops. These were located at Deptford. By 1836 these employed 100 men. In 1838 they were extended to simultaneously handle two vessels, and got a crane that could lift 66 tons. This was essential for placing engines and boilers in the ships. After 1829 all new vessels got engines by GSN itself. Hulls for wooden ships were built by local shipyards. Most iron ships were built by Ditchburn & Mare at Bow. The engineering gave GSN a cost advantage. They also allowed GSN to redress many defects in its early ships. In the 1830s the works assisted in lengthening most of the existing GSN fleet.

GSN operated wharves in Coldharbour and near London Bridge, with some piers and buildings designed by company architect and surveyor Robert Palmer Browne. In 1867 GSN would become the owner of St Katharine's Wharf.

=== Conclusions about the GSN up to 1850 ===
After some troubles and failed experiments in the first years, the GSN proved a very successful concern in the 1830s and 1840s. Solid profits allowed it to expand, to build up reserves, and to pay a good annual dividend to the shareholders.

The GSN was so successful for multiple reasons. It had a shrewd management and a sound investment policy, but this was not a unique feature of the GSN. What did set the GSN apart was the sheer size of its operations and its domination of the near Continental and some of the coastal steam shipping. This was enabled by a very strong capital base. From the start, the GSN spread its interests over a number of routes, making that survival did not depend on any of them. The large number ships that it owned gave if flexibility in allocating ships. In turn, this enabled the rich GSN to adopt ruthless competitive tactics that smaller companies could not adopt. In 1836 a merchant commented that: '... the moment a boat is attempted to be put on any (GSN) station they immediately put on a boat against it', (i.e. driving it out of business with a better boat at cheaper rates).

== 1850 - 1939 ==
=== The GSN in 1850 ===
By 1850 the GSN served seven lines to the near continent, seven ports on the British east coast, and was still strongly placed in the Margate and Ramsgate tourism. Most of these lines profited from collaborating with the competition. This was true for the coastal trade, and for the lines to Antwerp, Rotterdam and Hamburg.

In 1851 the GSN dominated trade into London. It had 67% of the sailings by British vessels from France, 48% from the Netherlands, and 95% of that from Belgium. Meanwhile competition by the railways had become a serious challenge. In 1850 a passenger could already travel between London and Edinburg much faster by train. The railway companies were also getting into shipping, e.g. the LBSCR. They also opened up a lot of new destinations for tourists, competing with the Margate and Ramsgate trips.

=== The cattle trade ===
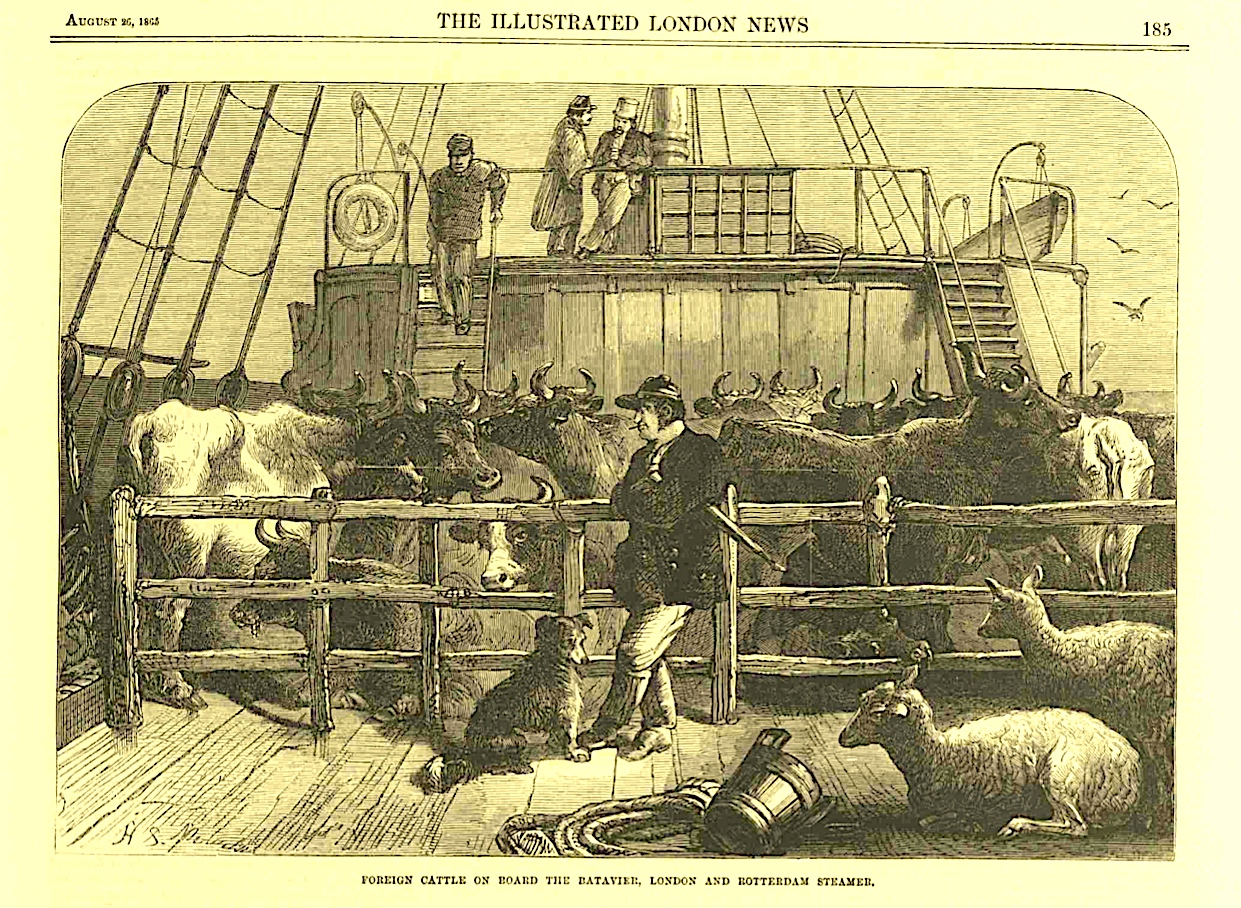
Cattle from Rotterdam on board Batavier

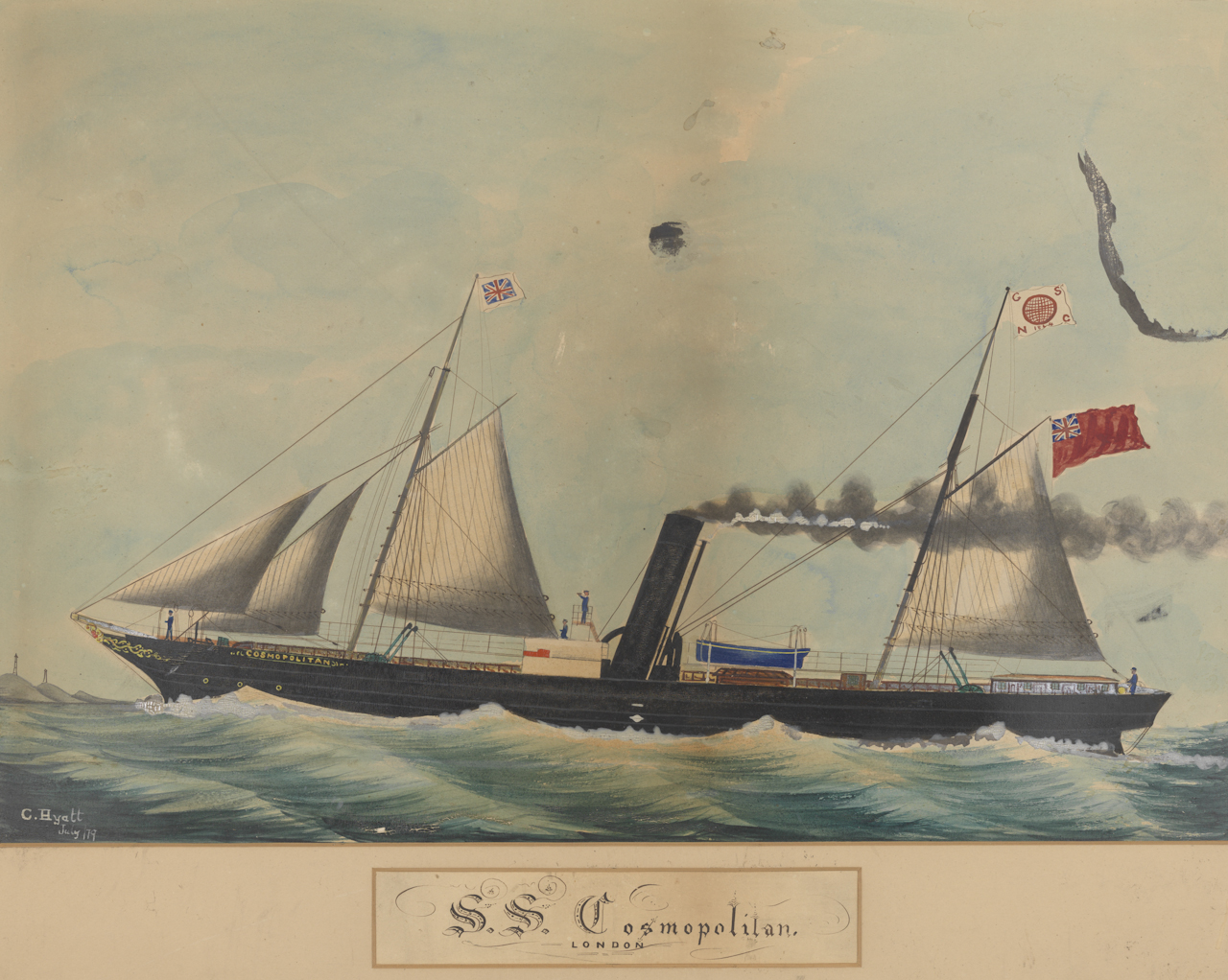
S.S. Cosmopolitan, of London

The GSN pioneered the trade in imported livestock, which proved highly lucrative and significant for GSN. The import of life cattle was made possible by the steamship, with its near-guaranteed date of arrival. It also boosted the trade in meats and dairy products. This was further increased by reductions in customs duties in the 1840 and 1850s. At first cattle was embarked on the regular from Rotterdam and Hamburg. Next a ship was regularly dispatched to collect cattle in Tönning, north of Hamburg. In 1851 a exceptional passage by the Giraffe brought in 279 oxen and cows, 67 calves and 500 sheep. In 1851 the "Northern Steam Packet Company" started to operate between Lowestoft and Tönning. It was a subsidiary of the Lowestoft Harbour and Railway Company, which provided transport to the London markets. The later North of Europe Steam Packet collapsed in 1858, but another company bought its ships, and continued the Tönning service.

=== The 1860s ===
In 1860 the GSN had 43 vessels, a mix of wooden paddle steamers, iron paddlers, and iron screw ships. From 1860 to 1869 a further 31 were built or bought, most of them iron screw ships. During this decade many old vessels were taken out of service, so only about 50 vessels remained by 1870.

The purchase of ships again showed the advantage of being a big company. GSN bought many of these 31 vessels second hand, and at bargain prices. An example of buying second hand was that in 1860 GSN bought four iron screw ships built in 1856 from the "Harburg English steam Navigation Company", and kept two of them on the Harburg line. This GSN behavior has been called a cost-aware willingness to use cheap second-hand ships. Other reasons might be that GSN's size made her far more likely to have a possible use for any second hand ship. GSN also had the technical expertise to inspect ships, and to fix them if necessary.

In 1860 the GSN's coastal ships went from London to Hull and Newcastle. In 1867 Yarmouth was added. A new service to Charente on the Bay of Biscay had been added to the continental destinations in December 1859. It was soon extended to Bordeaux and was served by four vessels. The cattle trade thrived, and GSN built three screw ships for this purpose. It was however depresses by the cattle plague (rinderpest) crossing over to Britain in 1865. In 1867 this led to a prohibition of moving cattle from the landing place by road, making GSN's cattle wharf at Brown's Wharf / Coldharbour useless.

Free trade agreements made that British exports to France and Germany almost doubled in the 1860s. Typical exports that GSN carried to Hamburg were: cotton, tapes, woollens, carpets, silk and beer. On return trips cattle, dairy products and other foodstuff dominated.

The most serious competition again came from the railways. In 1863 the Great Eastern Railway opened a line from Harwich to Rotterdam, carrying mainly cattle. In 1864 it opened a line to Antwerp. By 1866 the Great Eastern had five ships Avalon, Ipswich, Pacific, Stour, and Zealous. However, it lacked the capabilities to make effective use of these, and it would be 1883 before the GER Harwich lines started to grow. On the line to Charente and Bordeaux, the GSN got competition from a company from Liverpool. GSN reacted by slashing freight rates and obliged the competitor to withdraw after only a few months.

=== 1870 - 1890 ===
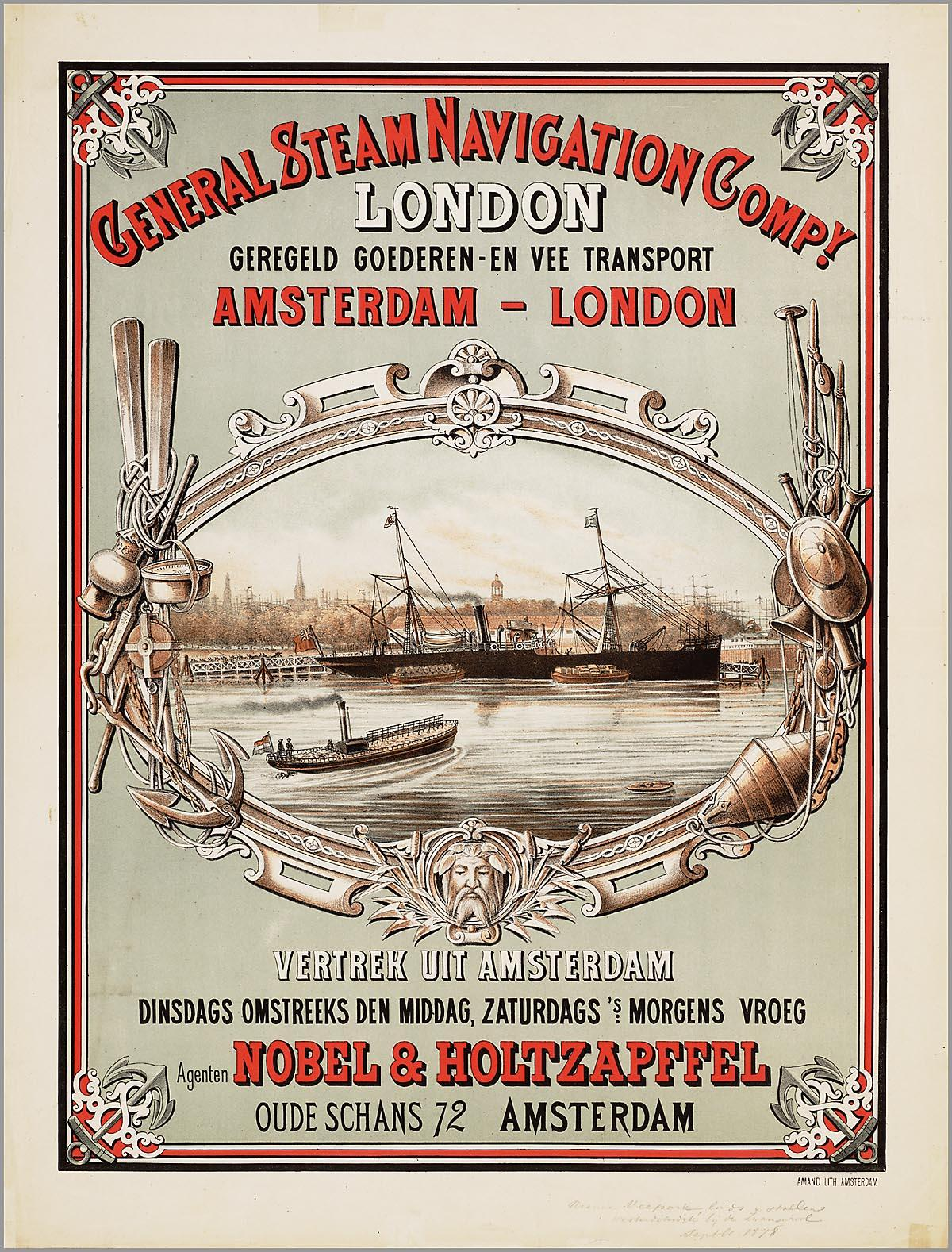
London - Amsterdam cattle and cargo c. 1878

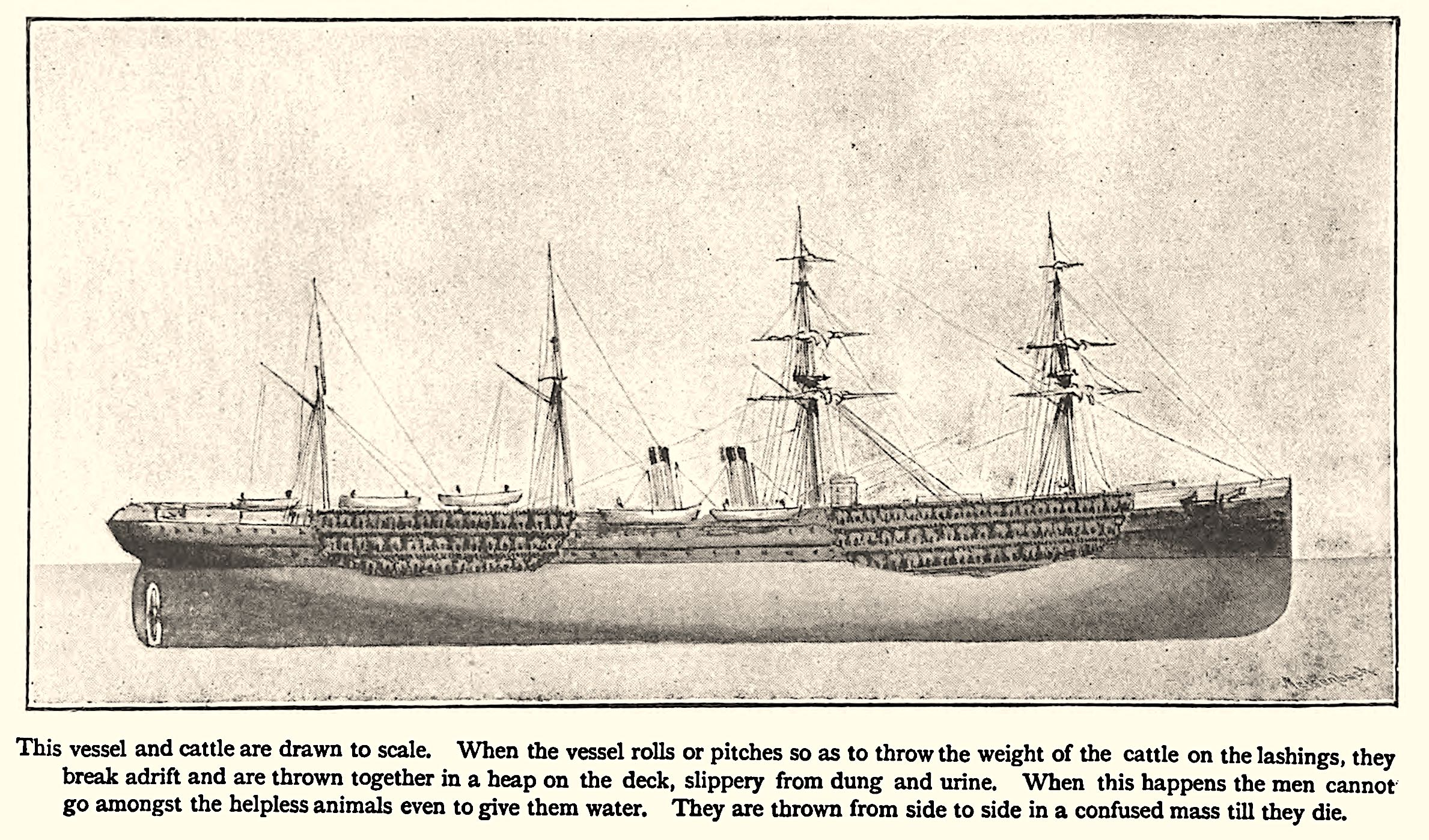
An 1890s cattle ship from America

In 1870 GSN was still a very important shipping company. It served seven regular destinations on the near-continent and four destinations on the British East coast. It offered regular excursions to Boulogne, Margate and Ramsgate. GSN had cattle lines to Harlingen and Geestemünde. In the 1870s GSN management tried to develop new lines to the near-continent, e.g. to Terneuzen and Ghent, Bordeaux, Groningen, but only a service to Porto seems to have become a more lasting venture. In 1882 GSN started a service to the Mediterranean, with calls at Genoa, Livorno, Naples, Messina and Palermo. It would become an enduring and profitable venture. On the other hand a major strike in 1889 in London led to traffic shifting to outports and to the continent. This also led to the closure of the Boulogne line.

During the 1870s tourism to the Kent and Essex coasts continued to develop. It was quite usual for three vessels to run a daily schedule to the Kent coast. The deck-saloon steamer Hoboken, acquired in 1877 was an innovation that greatly increased passenger comfort. In this decade GSN also added a tourist service to Great Yarmouth, which would become very important.

The cattle trade would not develop that well. In 1871 London authorities opened the Foreign Cattle Market in Deptford, where cattle imported from countries at risk from rinderpest had to be landed and slaughtered. This severely affected prices, and thus freight for GSN. Meanwhile the growing economies of France and Germany also began to import live cattle, diminishing their supply. Furthermore, American and Canadian cattle and frozen meat began to enter the British market in huge quantities.

The Long Depression that lasted from 1873 to 1896 was challenging for GSN. While the economy continued to grow, the pace was slower in Britain and faster on the continent. The shipment of dairy products, foodstuff and live cattle continued to boom, but now the continent also began to export industrial products to Britain. Meanwhile prices for food fell drastically, also impacting freight rates. For GSN, costs were steadily rising as cargo volumes and freight rates were cyclic. Another problem was that many direct connections from the continent were established. These circumvented the shipment of goods via GSN's profitable lines to London. The railway companies that were prepared to ship goods at a loss in order to feed their railways also continued to be a problem. In these circumstances, GSN's profits started to decline.

In June 1874 the situation led to the appointment of Joseph Herbert Tritton as chairman. He was a partner of the house bank Barclay, Bevan, Tritton & Co., later known as Barclays. It also led to the replacement of much of the old GSN management. The new management tried to cope with the situation by modernizing the GSN fleet. This led to 24 new steamships in the 1870s, as well as six second-hand ships. One of the ideas behind the modernization was to switch to more efficient larger ships with more efficient compound steam engines. The problem with this modernization was in the way that it was carried out. In the 1860s £300,000 had been spent cautiously on relatively inexpensive second hand ships. In the 1870s and 1880s a like sum was spent on larger and ever more expensive new-builds. During these years GSN also spent considerable sums on improving the wharves and the facilities at Deptford.

In order to pay for the modernization, the company's capital was expanded. In about 1874 this was £300,000 and in 1877 it had grown to almost £750,000, about half of it in preference shares. It meant that the dividend expected by the shareholders rose from £30,000 to £56,000 a year. In the late 1870s the GSN succeeded in maintaining a trading profit of about £100,000 a year, but the recent expansion of the company meant that this was now the minimum to serve dividends, reserves and deprecation. In 1881 the directors announced a reduction in the half year dividend for the first time in many years. From 1881 to 1884 GSN kept up a trading profit of about £100,000 a year. In 1885 a 50% decline in the receipts from cattle transport reduced the trading profit to only £38,000. The GSN then ceased to pay regular dividend, and only paid a reduced dividend on the preference shares. In late 1885 the company's £15 nominal shares had dropped to £7 from an 1880 sell price of £29.

The decline in GSN's fortunes led to serious confrontations with angry shareholders. In 1889 some of these were pressing for a committee of enquiry, and one of them called the management of the General Steam Navigation Company the 'laughing stock of the City'. What is certain, is that the company had overextended itself financially, and that when profits came under serious pressure from 1885, the management did not show caution, and had no plan B. In 1886 the first director with outside shipping experience was appointed. In 1890 the experienced shipper A. Howden was appointed.

=== 1890 - 1902 Nadir and recovery ===
By 1890 GSN was in deep trouble. It was obvious that the cattle trade would not recover, and that the shipping lines to the near-continent would continue to suffer from direct and indirect competition from the railways. The shipment of cargo via GSN's homeport London would also continue to decline. The only success were the Mediterranean services.

During these years, the management made serious attempts to get into more profitable activities. Amongst these, a line from Manchester via the Manchester Ship Canal to Rotterdam, and a line from Manchester to West Africa. These attempts were fruitless, and the failure of the shipping line to the West African coast even seriously aggravated the situation. In February 1893 chairman Tritton resigned. He was replaced by Sir James Lyle Mackay.

The Great Eastern Railway was meanwhile busy developing the Harwich to Hook of Holland service. In 1893/4 it commissioned three big modern steamers capable of 17.5 kn. GSN was therefore continuously monitoring whether it should continue its services to Amsterdam and Rotterdam. On the connection to Amsterdam it made a pooling arrangement with the Holland Steamship Company (Hollandsche Stoomboot Maatschappij), in which a Dutch railway had a major stake. On the Harlingen line, the ships Widgeon and Teal got a cool chamber to transport dairy products. In the Thames tourism market GSN faced though competition from the Victoria Steamboat Association (VSA) for a while. In 1898 GSN added a new Eagle of 647 tons and a speed of 17 kn to the fleet serviced Margate and Ramsgate.

Under these difficult business conditions, the new board tried to redress the situation, and succeeded. In 1896 GSN suddenly paid the full dividend on the preference shares, and applied £20,000 to depreciation of the fleet. The turnaround was such that a magazine suggested that it could only be due to creative bookkeeping. The turnaround was remarkable, and in 1897 GSN even paid a dividend of 2 per cent on the regular shares. However, as receipts grew from £432,695 in 1892 to £547,162 in 1901, profit remained low. This was caused by the creative accounting of the previous management, which had kept up profits by not properly depreciating the fleet. Now a substantial amount of profit (about £160,000 from 1895 to 1901) had to be used to depreciate the fleet, which meanwhile increased in size. Reducing debt and debentures was in general a high priority for the board.

=== 1902 - 1920 ===
In 1902 the work of reducing debt and writing of the fleet to a more realistic book value enabled the board to restructure the company. This came down forming a new legal entity with a capital of only £484,024. Each regular share of £15 could be traded for one new share of £7.5. The preference shareholders exchanged their £10 shares for £8 shares, but as these would now pay 6% instead of 5% they lost only very little. It was a sign of the already improved situation. In November 1902 Richard White became the new chairman, he was himself the largest shareholder with £25,000 in shares.

The new management took some measures towards vertical integration. The passenger and cargo agencies, brokers, and middlemen were up to then independent companies, but were now brought in-house. It turned GSN from a company that merely owned and managed ships into a transport company, controlling cargo from origin to destination, with offices in all principal continental ports.

The new management did prove able to develop business opportunities near home, in south Yorkshire and East-Anglia. New low-profile lines with small ships were started to Hull, Yarmouth, Grimsby, King's Lynn, and Norwich. GSN also remained committed to tourism. After some changes the fleet on the Kent services existed of the very popular Golden Eagle and Eagle in 1911. The passenger traffic from London to Scotland and the near-continent peaked at the turn of the century, but was more profitable.

Overall, the GSN made a remarkable recovery from its 1903 low point to 1913. It extended GSN's activities into cargo handling and forwarding, and increased involvement in Hull, Grimsby and Yarmouth. In spite of increased competition, it was able to do profitable business on the coastal and near-continent trade. Apart from that, the company fully paid the preference shareholders during this period, and paid 5% or 6% to the regular shares from 1905. Throughout the period both kind shares nevertheless never achieved a price equal to their nominal value.

=== World War I ===
World War I was an exceptional period for GSN. From its outbreak the fleet was largely under the control of the government. No less than 21 of its 46 ships were used as transports, supply ships and minesweepers. 23 ships were lost while five new ones were added. It was also a time of great profit for GSN, which doubled the nominal capital to £1,000,000.

== Subsidiary of P&O (1920 - 1972) ==
=== The Interwar period ===
After World War I GSN was a prize worth having for larger operators, because it could be used as feeder service for their deep-water trades. In 1920 P&O Steam Navigation bought a controlling stake in GSN at £5.10s per £1 ordinary share. During the Interwar period GSN would operate as a subsidiary of P&O. In 1923 it acquired part of the Great Yarmouth Shipping company, an acquisition which became complete in 1931. In 1935 the Moss Hutchison Line, which traded in the Mediterranean became a subsidiary of GSN.

GSN continued to provide pleasure cruises between London and resorts lower down the Thames. The purchase of the New Medway Steam Packet Co. in 1936 gave it a monopoly of this business.

=== World War II ===
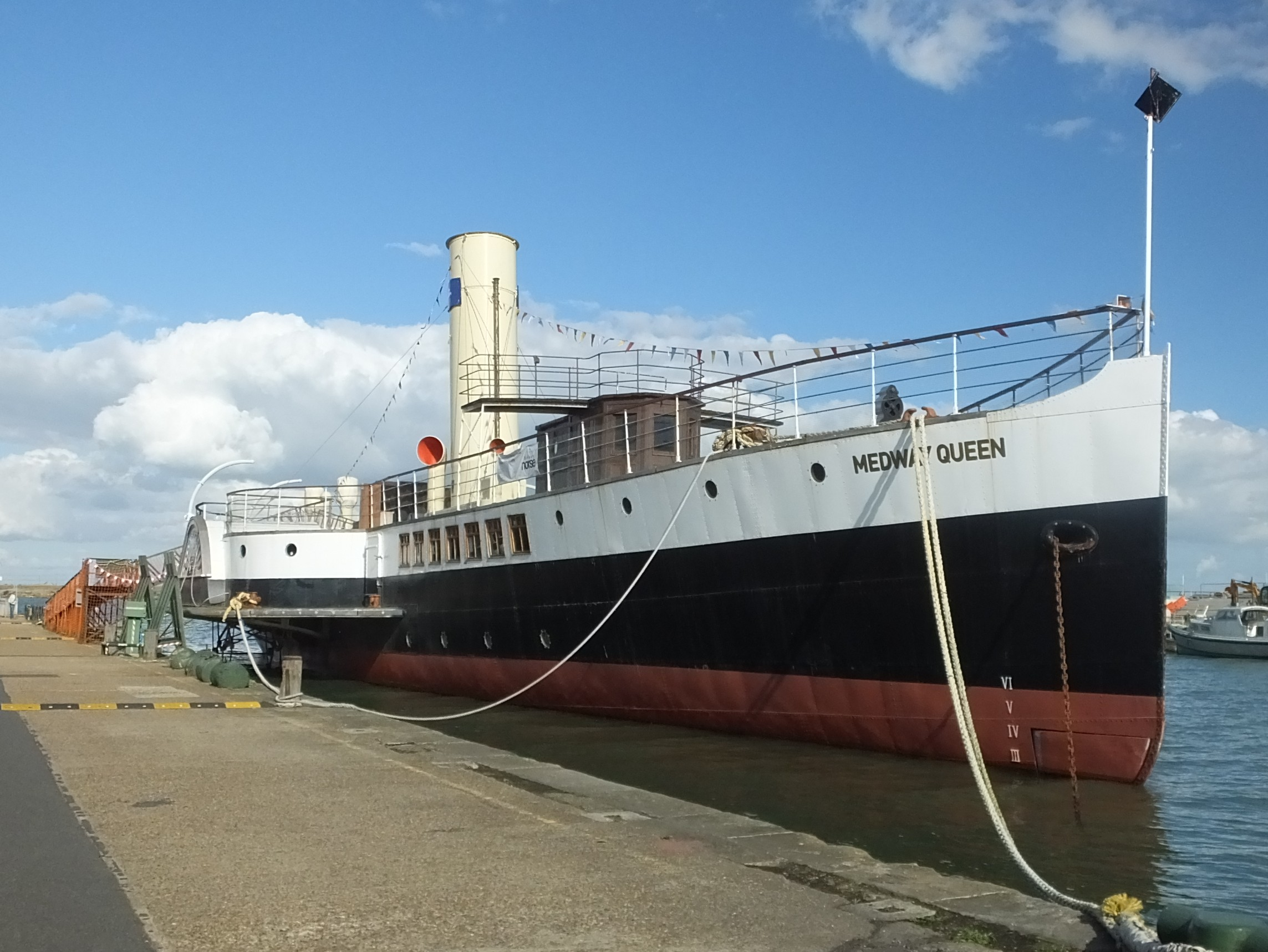
PS Medway Queen

At the start of World War II, the GSN had about 45 ships, of which 10 were pleasure vessels. During the 1940 Dunkirk evacuation, multiple GSN ships participated. Its paddle-steamers were especially effective, as they could carry many passengers and were very fast. Involved were the paddle steamers Royal Eagle (1932), Golden Eagle, Medway Queen, Crested Eagle, and Queen of Thanet. GSN ships saved around 10% of all those rescued from the French beaches.

=== Demise ===
By the mid 1960s the Thames excursion services were closed down, and the appearance of the container ship and the roll-on/roll-off ferry ended most of GSN's traditional business. GSN became a leading player in two Anglo-European consortia: North Sea Ferries and Normandy Ferries. These became the backbone of what ultimately evolved into P&O Ferries after P&O re-organized its subsidiaries in 1971. In October 1971 the minority shareholders in GSN were bought out, and its activities became part of P&O's European and Air Transport Division. GSN then ceased to exist as an independent company.
