= List of shipwrecks in August 1865 =

The list of shipwrecks in August 1865 includes ships sunk, foundered, grounded, or otherwise lost during August 1865.

== 1 August ==
List of shipwrecks: 1 August 1865
Ship	State	Description
Annie Mae	United States	The 31-ton sidewheel paddle steamer burned at Kingston, Illinois.
Daniel Shatterick	United Kingdom	The schooner collided with the schooner Elizabeth and sank in the Belfast Lough.
Hannah Booth	United Kingdom	The schooner ran aground on the Newcombe Sand, in the North Sea off the coast of Suffolk. She was refloated and resumed her voyage.
Henriette	Kingdom of Hanover	The schooner collided with Pero (Hamburg) in the North Sea and was abandoned by her crew, who were rescued by Pero. She was discovered the next day by the steamship Harvest Queen (United Kingdom). Henriette was towed in to Grangemouth, Stirlingshire, United Kingdom in a derelict condition on 6 August.
Louise Marie	Norway	The schooner was driven ashore near "Roo", Sweden. She was on a voyage from Hartlepool, County Durham, United Kingdom to Rødvig, Denmark. She was refloated on 6 August and towed in to Helsingør, Denmark.
Sergei	United Kingdom	The schooner was driven ashore near Callundborg, Denmark. She was on a voyage from Newcastle upon Tyne, Northumberland, United Kingdom to Rostock. She was refloated on 3 August and taken in to Callundborg for repairs.
Shooting Star	United Kingdom	The barque struck a sunken rock off the coast of Suffolk. She was on a voyage from Rochester, Kent to Sunderland, County Durham. She put in to Lowestoft, Suffolk in a leaky condition.
S. J. Sanderson	(United Kingdom of Great Britain and Ireland) British North America	The brig was wrecked on the Bird Island Reef. She was on a voyage from Glasgow, Renfrewshire to Jacmel, Haiti.

== 2 August ==
List of shipwrecks: 2 August 1865
Ship	State	Description
Aurora	Netherlands	The ship was lost near Lemvig, Denmark. She was on a voyage from Varde, Denmark to Grimstad, Norway.
Clifton	United Kingdom	The steamship ran aground in the River Avon. She was on a voyage from Bristol, Gloucestershire to London. She was refloated the next day and put back to Bristol.
Defiance	(United Kingdom of Great Britain and Ireland) New Zealand	The 27-ton ketch was driven ashore and wrecked during a fierce storm at Hokitika.
Hendrika	Netherlands	The ship was wrecked near Bremen. Her crew were rescued. She was on a voyage from Shoreham-by-Sea, Sussex, United Kingdom to "Farge".
Johannes	United Kingdom	The ship sprang a leak and sank north of the Caicos Islands. She was on a voyage from Haiti to Falmouth, Cornwall.
Margaretha Catherina	Grand Duchy of Oldenburg	The ship was wrecked on the Dunkerchensand. Her crew were rescued.
Montezuma	(United Kingdom of Great Britain and Ireland) Victoria	The 136-ton brig parted her cables and was driven ashore and wrecked during a fierce storm at Hokitika.

== 3 August ==
List of shipwrecks: 3 August 1865
Ship	State	Description
City of Calcutta, Shamrock, and an unnamed barque	United Kingdom	The full-rigged ship City of Calcutta ran aground in the Clyde at Dalmuir, Dunbartonshire. The steamship Shamrock ran aground and collided with City of Calcutta. A barque under tow then also ran aground, blocking navigation of the river completely. City of Calcutta and Shamrock were refloated the next day.
Elizabeth	United Kingdom	The ship ran aground at Varberg, Sweden. She was on a voyage from Newcastle upon Tyne, Northumberland to a Prussian port.
Embla	Norway	The brig was driven ashore and severely damaged at "Wiken", Sweden. She was on a voyage from Vyborg, Grand Duchy of Finland to Antwerp, Belgium.
Gem	United Kingdom	The sloop was driven ashore and wrecked near "Ording", Duchy of Holstein. She was on a voyage from Stornoway, Isle of Lewis, Outer Hebrides to Hamburg.
Jacobus	Netherlands	The ship was run down in the Baltic Sea. Her crew were rescued. She was on a voyage from Riga, Russia to Amsterdam, North Holland. She was towed in to Varberg, Sweden in a severely damaged condition.
Nancy	United Kingdom	The ship ran aground on The Manacles, Cornwall. She was on a voyage from Nantes, Loire-Inférieure, France to Liverpool, Lancashire. She was refloated on 9 August and towed in to Falmouth, Cornwall.

== 4 August ==
List of shipwrecks: 4 August 1865
Ship	State	Description
Augusta Josephine	United Kingdom	The ship collided with another vessel and sank in the Bristol Channel. She was on a voyage from Dublin to Swansea, Glamorgan.
Smerch	Imperial Russian Navy	The monitor struck an uncharted rock and sank off the Grand Duchy of Finland. She was refloated, repaired, and returned to service.

== 5 August ==
List of shipwrecks: 5 August 1865
Ship	State	Description
Adieu	United Kingdom	The brig was wrecked at Valparaíso, Chile.
Arrow	United States	The 290-ton sidewheel paddle steamer exploded in the North River in New York City off Manhattan′s 13th Street, killing five people.
Edith	United Kingdom	The ship was driven ashore on Lindisfarne, Northumberland. She was refloated and beached, but heeled over and sank.
Glenlee	United Kingdom	The ship caught fire at Mauritius and was scuttled. She was refloated.
Loi	France	The ship was wrecked on the South Bishop, Pembrokeshire, United Kingdom. All on board were rescued. She was on a voyage from Roscoff, Finistère to Liverpool, Lancashire, United Kingdom.
Williamson	United Kingdom	The ship capsized and sank at Fayal Island, Azores. She was on a voyage from Guadeloupe to Saint-Nazaire, Loire-Inférieure, France.

== 6 August ==
List of shipwrecks: 6 August 1865
Ship	State	Description
Africana	Argentina	The schooner was damaged in a storm at Buenos Aires.
Ajax	United Kingdom	The ship was driven ashore at Blakeney, Norfolk. She was on a voyage from Arkhangelsk, Russia to London. She was refloated and resumed her voyage.
Alabama	United States	The cutter foundered at Buenos Aires.
Augustina	Argentina	The pilot boat sank at Santa Lucía.
Buena Vista	Argentina	The schooner was driven ashore at Buenos Aires.
Carolina	Argentina	The barque was driven ashore at Buenos Aires.
Conceiçao	Brazil	The ship was wrecked at Maldonado, Uruguay.
Del Canto	Brazil	The schooner was run into by the barque Ensgezindgheid (Netherlands) and sank at Buenos Aires. Her crew were rescued by Francois Arago (Flag unknown). Del Canto was on a voyage from Santa Catalina to Buenos Aires. Also reported as Delcanto wrecked at Montevideo, Uruguay.
Delfin	Argentina	The pilot boat sank at Santa Lucía.
Facio	Argentina	The schooner was driven ashore at Buenos Aires. She was on a voyage from Buenos Aires to Concordia.
George	United Kingdom	The cutter foundered at Buenos Aires .
Goyana	Argentina	The schooner was driven ashore at Buenos Aires.
I. I.	France	The full-rigged ship was damaged in a storm at Buenos Aires.
Jean Bart	France	The ship was wrecked at Montevideo.
Jeja	Argentina	The pilot boat was driven ashore and wrecked at Buenos Aires.
Juanita	France	The barque was driven ashore south of Buenos Aires.
Manuela	Argentina	The pilot boat was driven ashore and wrecked at Buenos Aires.
Maria	Argentina	The schooner was driven ashore and wrecked at Buenos Aires.
Maria	Argentina	The pilot boat sank at Santa Lucía.
Nox	United Kingdom	The schooner was driven ashore and wrecked at Arroyo Seco, Montevideo, Uruguay.
Oronsa	United Kingdom	The ship was driven ashore in Cardigan Bay. She was on a voyage from the Clyde to Marseille, Bouches-du-Rhône, France. She was refloated and taken in to Milford Haven, Pembrokeshire.
Paraense	Imperial Brazilian Navy	The steamship was damaged in a storm at Buenos Aires.
Virtuosa	Argentina	The schooner was driven ashore and wrecked at Buenos Aires.

== 7 August ==
List of shipwrecks: 7 August 1865
Ship	State	Description
Active	United Kingdom	The schooner was driven ashore at West Point, Isle of Wight. She was on a voyage from Falmouth, Cornwall to London. She was refloated and taken in to Yarmouth, Isle of Wight.
Alice Richardson	United Kingdom	The ship was driven ashore on Amager, Denmark. She was on a voyage from Danzig to London. She was refloated and taken in to Dragør, Denmark.
Gyrn Castle	United Kingdom	The ship departed from Singapore, Straits Settlements for Shanghai, China. No further trace, presumed foundered with the loss of all hands.
Juddah Manaan	India	The barque ran aground in the Hooghly River.
Scotland	United Kingdom	The ship ran aground in the Hooghly River.

== 8 August ==
List of shipwrecks: 8 August 1865
Ship	State	Description
Alexandra	(United Kingdom of Great Britain and Ireland) New Zealand	The steamer was holed off the north Taranaki coast while trying to navigate through an entrance in a reef and sank as the vessel was running for shore. All hands were saved.
Elizabeth	United Kingdom	The brig ran aground on the Sondre Rosse, in the Baltic Sea off the coast of Denmark. She was on a voyage from Vyborg, Grand Duchy of Finland to London. She was refloated and resumed her voyage.
Friends	United Kingdom	The smack was run down and sunk off Belfast, County Antrim by the paddle steamer Royal Consort (United Kingdom). She was on a voyage from Glenarm to Belfast.
Ino	United Kingdom	The ship foundered. She was on a voyage from Valparaíso, Chile to Liverpool, Lancashire. A message in a bottle washed up in Dundrum Bay on 25 September giving the news.
Lady of the Lake	(United Kingdom of Great Britain and Ireland) New Zealand	The steamship was driven ashore at Hokitika. All on board were rescued.
Moeris	France	The steamship was driven ashore near Fort Saint-Jean, La Joliette, Bouches-du-Rhône. She was on a voyage from Alexandria, Egypt to Marseille.
Queen of India	United Kingdom	The ship was wrecked on Seal Island, Nova Scotia, British North America. She was on a voyage from Saint John, New Brunswick, British North America to Liverpool, Lancashire.
W. H. Hazelden	United Kingdom	The ship ran aground in the Hooghly River. She was refloated.

== 9 August ==
List of shipwrecks: 9 August 1865
Ship	State	Description
Ipswich	United Kingdom	The paddle steamer ran aground in the River Orwell. A boat was crushed by one of the paddle wheels during refloating operations killing one of the four people on board. Ipswich was on a voyage from Harwich, Essex to Ipswich, Suffolk.
Pewabic	United States	The wreck of Pewabic in 2013 or earlier. During a voyage from Houghton, Michigan, to Cleveland, Ohio, the 350- or 738-ton screw steamer, a package freighter carrying a cargo of copper ingots and copper ore, US$40,000 to US$50,000 in her safe, and 175 to 180 passengers, sank in 182 feet (55 m) of water in Lake Huron six nautical miles (11 km; 6.9 mi) off Thunder Bay Island near Alpena, Michigan, at 45°06′N 83°13′W after colliding with her sister ship, the cargo ship Meteor (United States). Meteor rescued 98 people from Pewabic; others died, and the death toll could not be determined because Pewabic's passenger manifest went down with the ship, but an estimated 100 to 125 people lost their lives.
Regent	United Kingdom	The ship was driven ashore on Seal Island, Nova Scotia, British North America. She was on a voyage from Saint John, New Brunswick, British North America to Liverpool, Lancashire.

== 10 August ==
List of shipwrecks: 10 August 1865
Ship	State	Description
Britannia	United Kingdom	The fishing smack was run down by a steamship and sank in the North Sea. One of her four crew were reported missing. Survivors were rescued by the steamship Zingari (United Kingdom).
Flash	(United Kingdom of Great Britain and Ireland) Bahamas	The schooner was wrecked on the Burch's Look-out Reef, off the Caicos Islands. Her crew were rescued. She was on a voyage from New York, United States to Port-au-Prince, Haiti.
Shifty	United Kingdom	The ship was wrecked on the Cannon Rock, off the coast of County Down. She was on a voyage from Queensferry, Flintshire to Belfast, County Antrim.

== 11 August ==
List of shipwrecks: 11 August 1865
Ship	State	Description
Artemus, and Sker	United Kingdom	Artemus collided with the schooner Skeroff Holyhead, Anglesey. Artemus was taken in tow by the tug Prince Arthur (United Kingdom) but consequently capsized and sank off Rock Ferry, Cheshire. All on board were rescued. Artemus was on a voyage from Sierra Leone to Liverpool, Lancashire. She was refloated on 13 August and taken in to Liverpool. Sker was abandoned by her crew, who were rescued by Artemus. She was on a voyage from Liverpool to Dublin. She was subsequently taken in to Liverpool by the tug Royal Alfred (United Kingdom).
Meteor	United States	The cargo ship was damaged in a collision with Pewabic (United States) on 9 August in Lake Huron. She proceeded on to the St. Mary's Canal basin where water leaking in ignited her cargo of lime. She burned to the waterline and sank or was scuttled. Was rebuilt and returned to service. Four crew were killed attempting to scuttle her.
St. George	United Kingdom	The ship departed from the Rio Bento for Liverpool. No further trace, presumed foundered with the loss of all hands.
Strathpeffer	United Kingdom	The ship ran aground at Dundee, Forfarshire. She was on a voyage from Calcutta, India to Dundee.

== 12 August ==
List of shipwrecks: 12 August 1865
Ship	State	Description
Sharp	United Kingdom	The schooner was wrecked on the Elbow End Bank, at the mouth of the River Tay with the loss of all five crew. She was on a voyage from Newcastle upon Tyne, Northumberland to Dundee, Forfarshire.

== 13 August ==
List of shipwrecks: 13 August 1865
Ship	State	Description
Novar	United Kingdom	The schooner was wrecked on the Elbow End Bank, in the River Tay with the loss of all five crew. She was on a voyage from South Shields, County Durham to Dundee, Forfarshire.
Sam Cearns	United Kingdom	The ship was damaged by fire at Birkenhead, Cheshire.
St. Hilda	United Kingdom	The schooner was holed by her anchor and severely damaged at Dundee.

== 14 August ==
List of shipwrecks: 14 August 1865
Ship	State	Description
Abeona	United Kingdom	The ship was wrecked at "Southshots", Newfoundland, British North America. She was on a voyage from Dalhousie, New Brunswick, British North America to Stockton-on-Tees, County Durham.
George V	Kingdom of Hanover	The ship departed from Arkhangelsk, Russia for the Humber. No further trace, presumed foundered with the loss of all hands.
Pilot, and an unnamed fishing boat	United Kingdom	The schooner Pilot collided with a fishing boat, which capsized sank with the loss of her captain. Five survivors were rescued by other fishing boats. Pilot was consequently beached at Beadnell, Northumberland.
Primrose	United Kingdom	The ship ran aground. She was on a voyage from Liverpool, Lancashire to Boulogne, Pas-de-Calais, France. She was refloated and put back to Liverpool.
Providence	United Kingdom	The sloop was wrecked on the Isle of May. Her crew were rescued. She was on a voyage from Granton, Lothian to the Isle of May.
Sardinian	United Kingdom	The ship ran aground and was damaged at Falmouth, Cornwall. She was on a voyage from Liverpool to Aden.

== 15 August ==
List of shipwrecks: 15 August 1865
Ship	State	Description
Arata	United Kingdom	The ship ran aground in the Min River. She was on a voyage from Foochow, China to London. She was refloated and resumed her voyage.
Elizabeth Wright	United Kingdom	The schooner was driven ashore at Lossiemouth, Moray. She was on a voyage from the River Spey to Banff, Aberdeenshire. She was refloated the next day and taken in to Lossiemouth in a severely damaged condition.
Primrose	United Kingdom	The ship ran aground at Liverpool, Lancashire. She was on a voyage from Liverpool to Boulogne, Pas-de-Calais, France. She was refloated and put back to Liverpool.

== 16 August ==
List of shipwrecks: 16 August 1865
Ship	State	Description
RMS China	United Kingdom	The steamship ran aground at Boston, Massachusetts, United States. She was refloated.
Prudence	United Kingdom	The ship was run ashore at Dungeness, Kent. She was on a voyage from Boulogne-sur-Mer, Pas-de-Calais, France to Runcorn, Cheshire She was refloated on 19 August and towed in to dover, Kent.

== 17 August ==
List of shipwrecks: 17 August 1865
Ship	State	Description
Kate	United Kingdom	The ship sank at St. Andrews, Fife.

== 18 August ==
List of shipwrecks: 18 August 1865
Ship	State	Description
Adonis	United Kingdom	The ship was driven ashore at Blakeney, Norfolk. She was on a voyage from Sunderland, County Durham to Burnham Overy Staithe, Norfolk.
Colbert	France	The ship was driven ashore near Bahia, Brazil.
Euxine	United Kingdom	The full-rigged ship was abandoned in the Atlantic Ocean (44°50′N 35°39′W). Her 23 crew were rescued by the brig Demetrio Fario ( Austrian Empire). Euxine was on a voyage from Belfast, County Antrim to Quebec City, Province of Canada, British North America.
Fernanda	(United Kingdom of Great Britain and Ireland) Cape Colony	The schooner was wrecked in Table Bay.
Hugh Lindsay	India	The paddle steamer was wrecked at "Bassadore" in the Persian Gulf. All on board survived.
Lephenstrath	United Kingdom	The ship arrived at Havana, Cuba on fire and was scuttled. She was on a voyage from the Clyde to Havana. She was later refloated.

== 20 August ==
List of shipwrecks: 20 August 1865
Ship	State	Description
Balbec	United Kingdom	The steamship was damaged by fire at Liverpool, Lancashire.
Mathieu	France	The brig was severely damaged in the Rio Pongo.

== 21 August ==
List of shipwrecks: 21 August 1865
Ship	State	Description
Eagle Speed	United Kingdom	The ship was wrecked in the Mutlah River, India with the loss of 292 of the 536 people on board. She was on a voyage from Calcutta, India to British Guiana.
Remark	United Kingdom	The brig foundered in the Pacific Ocean 80 nautical miles (150 km) off Tahiti. Her crew survived. She was on a voyage from Valparaíso, Chile to New Zealand.
Sarah Ann	United Kingdom	The ship foundered in the Atlantic Ocean. She was on a voyage from Penzance, Cornwall to Quebec City, Province of Canada, British North America.

== 22 August ==
List of shipwrecks: 22 August 1865
Ship	State	Description
Ladonia	United States	The 75-ton screw towboat was lost.

== 23 August ==
List of shipwrecks: 23 August 1865
Ship	State	Description
Argosy No. 3	United States	The steamer went aground and suffered a steam explosion at Hatfield's Landing, White Mills, Kentucky, 80 nautical miles (150 km) downstream of Louisville, Kentucky. At least ten people died.
Evelyn	United Kingdom	The steamship ran ashore on Rathlin Island, County Donegal. She was on a voyage from Glasgow, Renfrewshire to Limerick. She was refloated and taken in to Londonderry for repairs.
USS Commodore McDonough	United States Navy	The sidewheel gunboat foundered in the Atlantic Ocean off the United States East Coast while under tow from Port Royal, South Carolina, to New York.
Sarah Ann	United Kingdom	The ship collided with the schooner Helen ( (United Kingdom of Great Britain and Ireland) Jersey) and foundered in the North Sea. Her crew were rescued by Helen. Sarah Ann was on a voyage from Newcastle upon Tyne, Northumberland to Rotterdam, South Holland, Netherlands.

== 24 August ==
List of shipwrecks: 24 August 1865
Ship	State	Description
Hans Jacob	Prussia	The yacht foundered off Zoutelande, Zeeland, Netherlands with the loss of three lives.
Ishjornen	Flag unknown	The ship was driven ashore at Boddam, Aberdeenshire, United Kingdom. She was on a voyage from Boddam to a Baltic port.
Perseverance	United Kingdom	The ship ran aground in the Exe Estuary and was wrecked. She was on a voyage from Newcastle upon Tyne, Northumberland to Exeter, Devon.

== 25 August ==
List of shipwrecks: 25 August 1865
Ship	State	Description
Mullogh	(United Kingdom of Great Britain and Ireland) New Zealand	The steamship was wrecked at Sumner.
Providence	United Kingdom	The ship was driven ashore at Teignmouth, Devon.

== 26 August ==
List of shipwrecks: 26 August 1865
Ship	State	Description
Jane and Isabella	United Kingdom	The schooner sank 5 nautical miles (9.3 km) off the Mull of Kintyre, Argyllshire. Her four crew reached Gigha in their boat.
Spartan	(United Kingdom of Great Britain and Ireland) British North America	The steamship struck rock in the Lachine Rapids, Saint Lawrence River and sank. She was refloated on 4 October and taken in to Montreal, Province of Canada for repairs.

== 27 August ==
List of shipwrecks: 27 August 1865
Ship	State	Description
Gratitude	United Kingdom	The barque was wrecked at Agger, Denmark with the loss of all but two of her crew.
Mountaineer	United Kingdom	The ship departed from Mobile, Alabama, United States for Liverpool, Lancashire. No further trace, presumed foundered with the loss of all hands.
Reaper	United Kingdom	The ship was wrecked on the Little Fiskars Rocks, on the Swedish coast.
Triumph	United Kingdom	The barque was driven ashore on Cross Island, Maine, United States. She was on a voyage from Sunderland, County Durham to Saint John, New Brunswick, British North America. She had been refloated by 30 September and towed in to Eastport, Maine for repairs.

== 28 August ==
List of shipwrecks: 28 August 1865
Ship	State	Description
Alphonsine Irma	France	The ship was wrecked at Galle, Ceylon.
Indiz	Flag unknown	The steamship was damaged by fire at Yokohama, Japan.
Industry	United Kingdom	The schooner sank at Newcastle upon Tyne, Northumberland.

== 29 August ==
List of shipwrecks: 29 August 1865
Ship	State	Description
Josephine	United Kingdom	The full-rigged ship ran aground on the Gunnet Sand, in the North Sea. She was on a voyage from Leith, Lothian to Kronstadt, Russia. She was refloated and put in to North Shields, Northumberland in a leaky condition.
Uzella	United Kingdom	The schooner was driven ashore near Burg auf Fehmarn. Duchy of Holstein. She was on a voyage from Hamburg to Flensburg, Duchy of Holstein, or from Flensburg to Danzig.

== 30 August ==
List of shipwrecks: 30 August 1865
Ship	State	Description
Harvest Queen	United Kingdom	The steamship ran aground in the Elbe. She was on a voyage from Hamburg to Grangemouth, Stirlingshire.

== 31 August ==
List of shipwrecks: 31 August 1865
Ship	State	Description
Charles Edwards	United Kingdom	The schooner was run down and sunk 2 nautical miles (3.7 km) south west of Bardsey Island, Pembrokeshire by the steamship Aleppo (United Kingdom) with the loss of all on board.
Fear Not	United Kingdom	The Yorkshire Billyboy was driven ashore north of Berwick upon Tweed, Northumberland. She was refloated and towed in to Berwick upon Tweed, but consequently sank. Her crew were rescued.

== Unknown date ==
List of shipwrecks: Unknown date in August 1865
Ship	State	Description
Alexander	Flag unknown	The schooner was driven ashore in the Nieuwe Diep. She was on a voyage from Memel, Prussia to Purmerend, North Holland, Netherlands.
Chiga Bene	United Kingdom	The ship was wrecked at Padang, Netherlands East Indies on or before 28 August.
Eliza	United Kingdom	The ship foundered in the Irish Sea 20 nautical miles (37 km) south of the Mine Head Lighthouse, County Waterford. Her crew were rescued. She was on a voyage from Newport, Monmouthshire to Skibbereen, County Kerry.
Empress	United Kingdom	The ship was wrecked near Vyborg, Grand Duchy of Finland. Her crew were rescued.
Gem	(United Kingdom of Great Britain and Ireland) New Zealand	The 25-ton schooner was wrecked on a sandbar at Poverty Bay towards the end of August.
Hira	(United Kingdom of Great Britain and Ireland) New Zealand	The schooner left on a regular journey from Tauranga to Whangamata during a gale on 18 August and was not seen again. Her nameboard and hatch were found by the crew of the schooner Fancy late in August.
John Croper	United Kingdom	The ship was lost near Singapore, Straits Settlements.
Merry Monarch	United Kingdom	The ship was wrecked on "Cosmolado Island", north of Madagascar. Her crew were rescued. She was on a voyage from Calcutta, India to New York, United States.
Meteor	United States	The vessel burned and sank at Sault St. Marie, Michigan in mid August. Raised and repaired.
New Zealand	United States	The steamship was wrecked at Hokitika, New Zealand. She was on a voyage from Otago to Hokitika.
Prince of Wales	United Kingdom	The ship ran aground and was wrecked. She was on a voyage from Siam to Bombay, India.
Shard	United Kingdom	The ship was wrecked on Anticosti Island, Nova Scotia, British North America. She was on a voyage from Quebec City, Province of Canada, British North America to Liverpool, Lancashire.
Stockman	United States	The 81-ton screw steamer burned at Bear Creek, Michigan.
Thomas Campbell	United Kingdom	The ship departed from Troon, Ayrshire for Madras, India. No further trace, presumed foundered with the loss of all hands.
Titania	(United Kingdom of Great Britain and Ireland) New Zealand	The steamship was wrecked at Hokitika.
Wokee	China	The steamship struck rocks between "Bohan Island" and "Davis Island" before 28 August and was beached on "Napier Island" in a waterlogged condition
