= Thames steamers =

Early 18th century steamboats in England

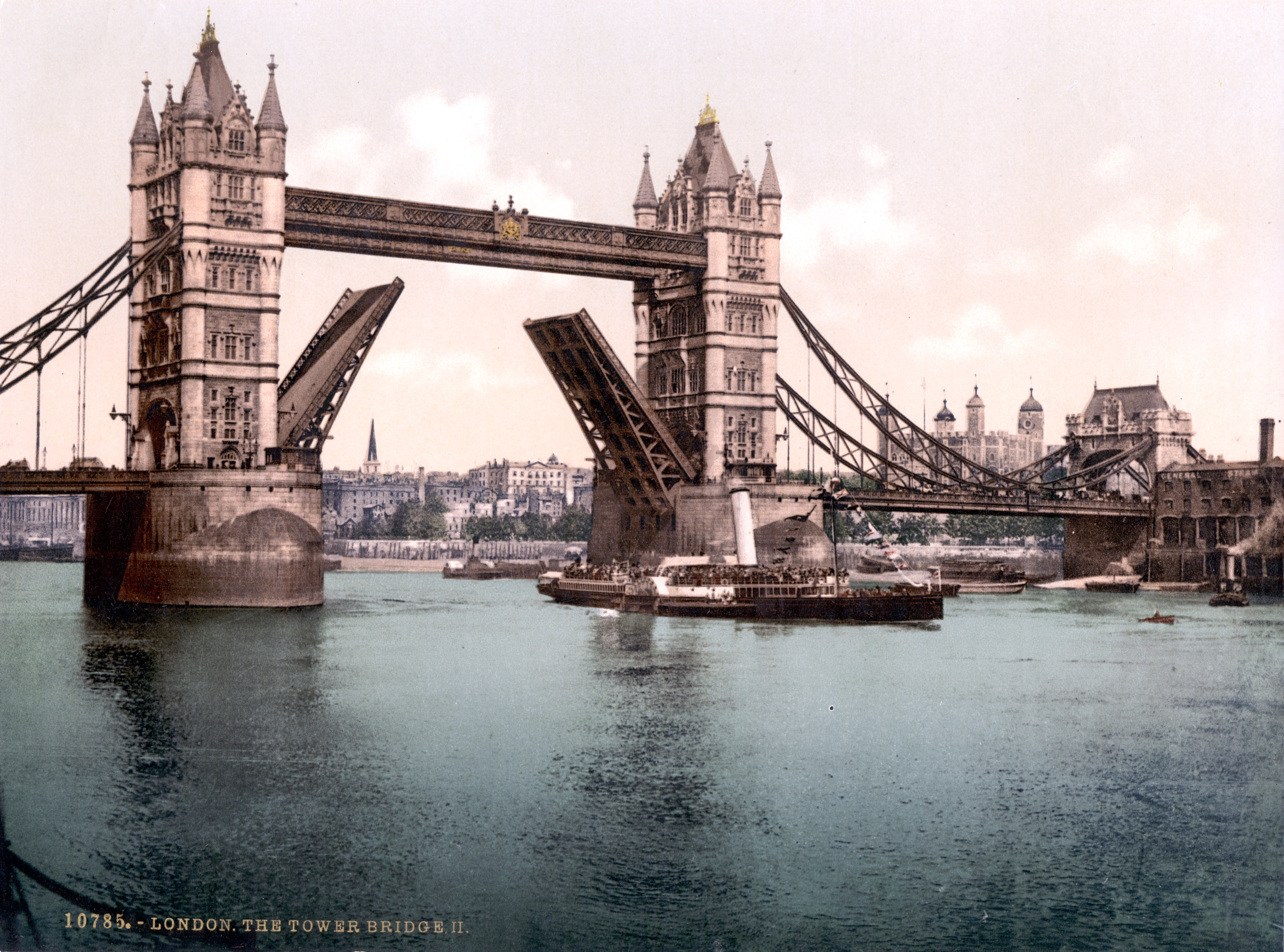
A pleasure steamer passing under Tower Bridge in 1900

Steamboat services started on the Thames in around 1815 and for nearly 25 years were the main use of steam to carry passengers before the emergence of railways in the south of England. During this time at least 80 steamers are recorded in the Thames and the Steamboat Act 1819 became the first statute to regulate the safety of the new technology for the public. Wooden boats driven by paddle-wheels, they managed during this time to establish themselves as faster and more reliable than the earlier use of sailing and rowing boats for passenger transport within the Thames estuary.

The early lead in practical steamboats established by William Symington in 1803 with the Charlotte Dundas in Scotland was not maintained, and the first steamboat passenger service was established in the United States in 1807 by Robert Fulton with his North River Steamboat on the Hudson River, using an engine manufactured in Birmingham. The first service on the Thames that can be established properly is the Margery in 1815, though the Richmond may have started taking passengers in 1813.

== Early paddle steamers ==
England, being the birthplace of the steam engine, was quick to put the engine to use by and on the river; a land-based Newcomen pumping engine was located at Pimlico in 1742. Other pumps soon followed. With the improvements of the steam engine by James Watt by 1776, William Symington's Charlotte Dundas in 1803 and the building of the PS Comet steamship by Henry Bell in 1812 to service the Clyde, steamships were soon sailing the Thames.

One of the earliest records is of a vessel Margery which was launched at Dumbarton in June 1814 and having run for a few months on the Clyde was purchased by the London firm of Cortis & Co. She steamed down the east coast and arrived at Gravesend in January 1815, entering service on the Long Ferry route from Gravesend to London on 23 January. Another contender for the first steamboat on the Thames was the Richmond which was brought from Bristol by a Mr. Dawson in 1813, but this was not a success. Civil engineer George Dodd placed an order for a steam paddle boat, also called Richmond, with Lepinghall & Co of Yarmouth in 1814 and this may have gone into service the same year, or possibly the next, on the route from London to Richmond. Dodd next bought the steamboat Duke of Argyll in Scotland, which reached London on 12 June 1815 having covered 756 miles at sea. She was put into service as Thames between London and Margate, the third major route in the Thames estuary, much used by passengers from the continent as well as for pleasure trips to the Kent coast by Londoners. The first steam passenger boat to have been built on the Thames, the Regent, designed by Marc Isambard Brunel built by Henry Maudsley and at 112 feet long larger than previous boats, was put into service in 1816 on the Margate run and served as a mail boat. Brunel's attempt to interest the Admiralty in steam-powered tugs for getting naval vessels in and out of harbour was met by the rebuff that they "consider the introduction of steam is calculated to strike a fatal blow at the naval superiority of the empire".

These three major Thames routes had been established since at least the seventeenth century, using a mixture of sailing boats (hoys) and rowing boats (tilt-boats), the latter being large boats (minimum 15 tons) which carried up to 40 passengers. From 1802 there were 8 or 9 passage packets (80-100 tons) running daily during the summer season and carrying some 20,000 people between London and Margate. Both sailing and rowing boats reacted strongly to the new competition and improved their facilities or provided extra crews on the Long Ferry. By 1826 it was clear that the steamers were winning as new jetties were constructed alongside the river to service them, although it took the Watermen's Company, which had tried to hold on to their traditional monopoly, until 1841 to establish the Watermen's Steam Packet Company to operate their own steam service.

The Margate Steam Packet Company was the first new company to set up to exploit the new technology in 1815, followed by the Gravesend Steam Packet Company in 1817. But major accidents were soon being recorded. The Regent caught fire near Whitstable on 2 July 1817 and was totally destroyed, mercifully with no loss of life. The cause was a lack of fireproof lining between the funnel and the wooden deck beams. Boiler explosions were not uncommon, happening, for example, on the Richmond in 1817. Consequently, in 1817 a Select Committee was established to enquire into the matter, leading to the Steamboat Act of 1819, which made it compulsory for all passenger-carrying steam vessels to be registered and inspected annually by a competent engineer.

The General Steam Navigation Company, initially established in 1821 and incorporated in 1824, was founded by a syndicate of London businessmen including William J Hall, a shipowner, and brothers Thomas and John Brockelbank, who had timber and shipyard interests in Deptford. The Brockelbanks' paddle steamer Eagle provided a service between London and Margate. By 1825 the GSNC was operating a fleet of 15 Deptford-built steamers, maintained from a yard at the Stowage, Deptford (a former East India Company depot).

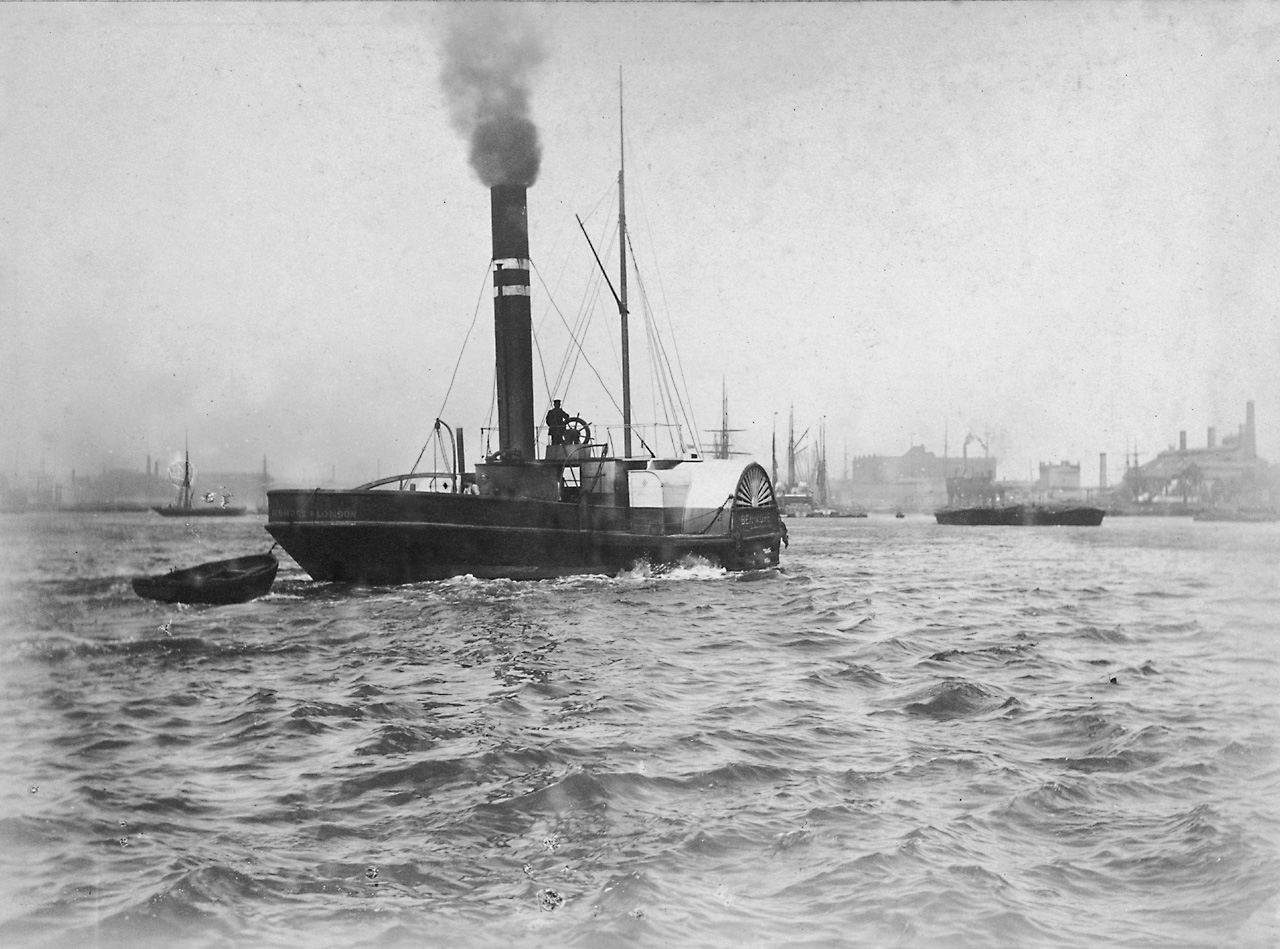
The tug PS Ben More on the Thames, 1884

Other vessels of this time were the Majestic and Defiance. The Hero of 1821 was built locally and put to work. By 1822, the Margate SP Co. alone carried over 27,000 passengers to and from Margate and competition was brisk. The biggest boom came in the 1830s with the creation of the Star, Diamond and Woolwich SP Companies which added many more new boats. By 1834, when they were fighting the establishment of the Great Western Railway, the Thames Commissioners boasted that they "had made the Thames navigation one of the most perfect in the Kingdom". In 1835, the Diamond SP Company reported that it had carried over 250,000 passengers in the year.

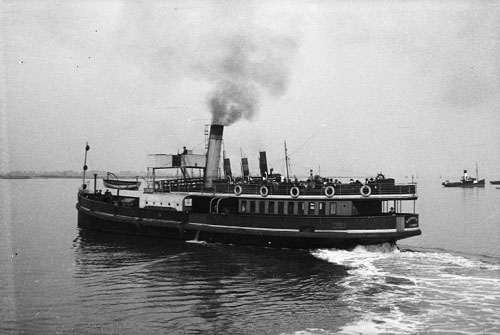
Ferry SS Gertrude, built 1906, pictured on Gravesend-Tilbury run in 1924 or 1925

Iron boats were introduced in 1845 by the City Steamboat Company with their Citizen boats built by the Thames Ironworks. The Westminster Company also had iron boats specializing in taking gentlemen from the City to Waterloo station which opened in 1848 on the south bank - a route that was eventually taken over by the Waterloo and City Line underground. They were known as 'penny boats' from their standard fare. A competing 'ha'penny boat', the Cricket was short-lived, retiring after its boiler burst causing loss of life.

The first steam ferry to cross the tidal Thames was the Woolwich Free Ferry which opened on 23 March 1889. The original fleet was three side-loading paddle steamers, Duncan, Gordon and Hutton. In the early 1900s they were using Squires, Gordon, Benn and Will Crooks. Another at Tilbury used Catherine, Edith, Gertrude and Rose. Dartford had a car ferry serviced by Mimmie and Tessa. Further up the river many bridges and several tunnels (the first, the Thames Tunnel, opened in 1843) were constructed to take cross-river traffic.

== Cargo tugs and steamers ==
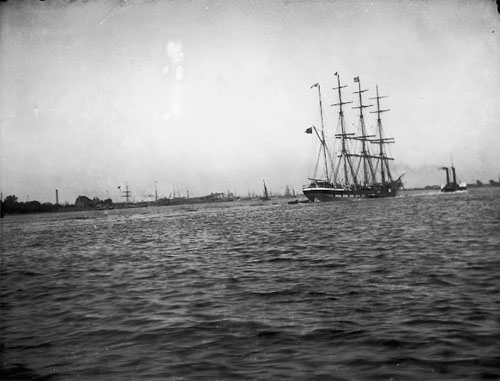
The barque Talavera (1882) being towed by a steam tug on the Thames, around 1890

The first steam tug on the Thames was the Majestic in 1816. The use of tugs to guide sailing boats bringing passengers and cargo up the London river increased the efficiency of operations enormously and the paddle wheel showed off its maximum advantage. Paddle tugs could apply full power quickly in either direction and by having separate engines for each paddle wheel could virtually turn on the spot.

The Port of London, which was handling 12,000 coastal vessels and over 3,000 overseas vessels annually by the end of the eighteenth century, quickly became dependent on steamers. Previously, gangs of men in rowboats drew the sailing vessels to port against wind and tide. By 1830, the use of steam tugs became part of the battleground between the competing dock companies as the London Dock Company and the Saint Katharine Dock Company both used steamships to tow vessels up-river past the West India Docks. By 1860, screw tugs were beginning to appear, but paddle tugs continued to be constructed throughout the nineteenth century and only finally disappeared in the 1920s with the advent of diesel propulsion. One steam tug survives at West India Docks, the ST Portway. Another, the ST Challenge, is due to return to the Thames in 2018. She will be berthed at Trinity Buoy Wharf.

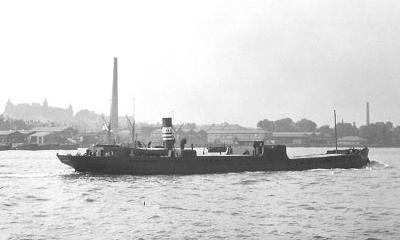
Gas Light and Coke Company's SS Suntrap at Woolwich in 1931, steaming upriver to Nine Elms Gasworks

== Pleasure steamers ==
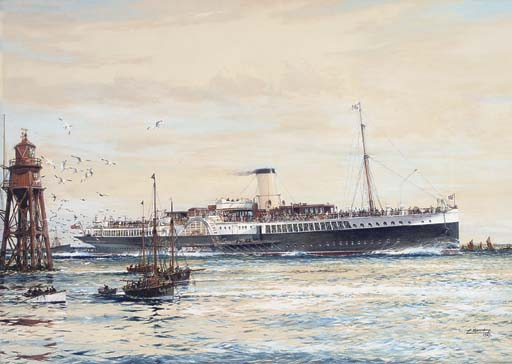
PS Crested Eagle, launched 1925 for the General Steam Navigation Company, operating on the Southend, Margate and Ramsgate service, later to Clacton and Felixstowe

The arrival of the London and Greenwich Railway in 1838 and the opening of the South Eastern Railway to Dover in 1844 were the first challenges to passenger traffic on the Thames. However it took the opening of the line to Gravesend in 1849 to spell the end of the heyday of Thames passenger craft. "From 1851 onwards, it was no longer quicker cheaper and safer to go by water, and though the steamers were still packed to capacity on summer holidays and at weekends, the money earned was not enough to maintain the large number of vessels."

== The Upper Thames ==
Richmond or Twickenham long remained the practical upper limit of steamboats on the Thames, though the competition through London was keen, with the fare dropping to 1/2d each way on shorter trips. Paddle Steamers found it difficult to pass through the narrow locks and as late as 1843 steam boats were prohibited from passing Teddington Lock. When they could, they found much of the river too full of weed. It took the Thames Conservancy until 1877 to clear it before screw steamers became a practical proposition, when a service started between Hampton Court and Staines using the Runnymede. In 1878 the Thames and Isis Steamboat Company started a service between Kingston and Oxford with Isis taking 3 days. In 1888 Salter Bros established a rival service using the steam boat Alaska, and have retained an important role on the river ever since.

Boats were modified to maximise the number of passengers and minimize the air draught to get under the low bridges and the service entered a period of prosperity it was to keep for the next fifty years. Diesel engines did not take over until after the second world war.

== Steamers of the 2012 Diamond Jubilee Flotilla ==
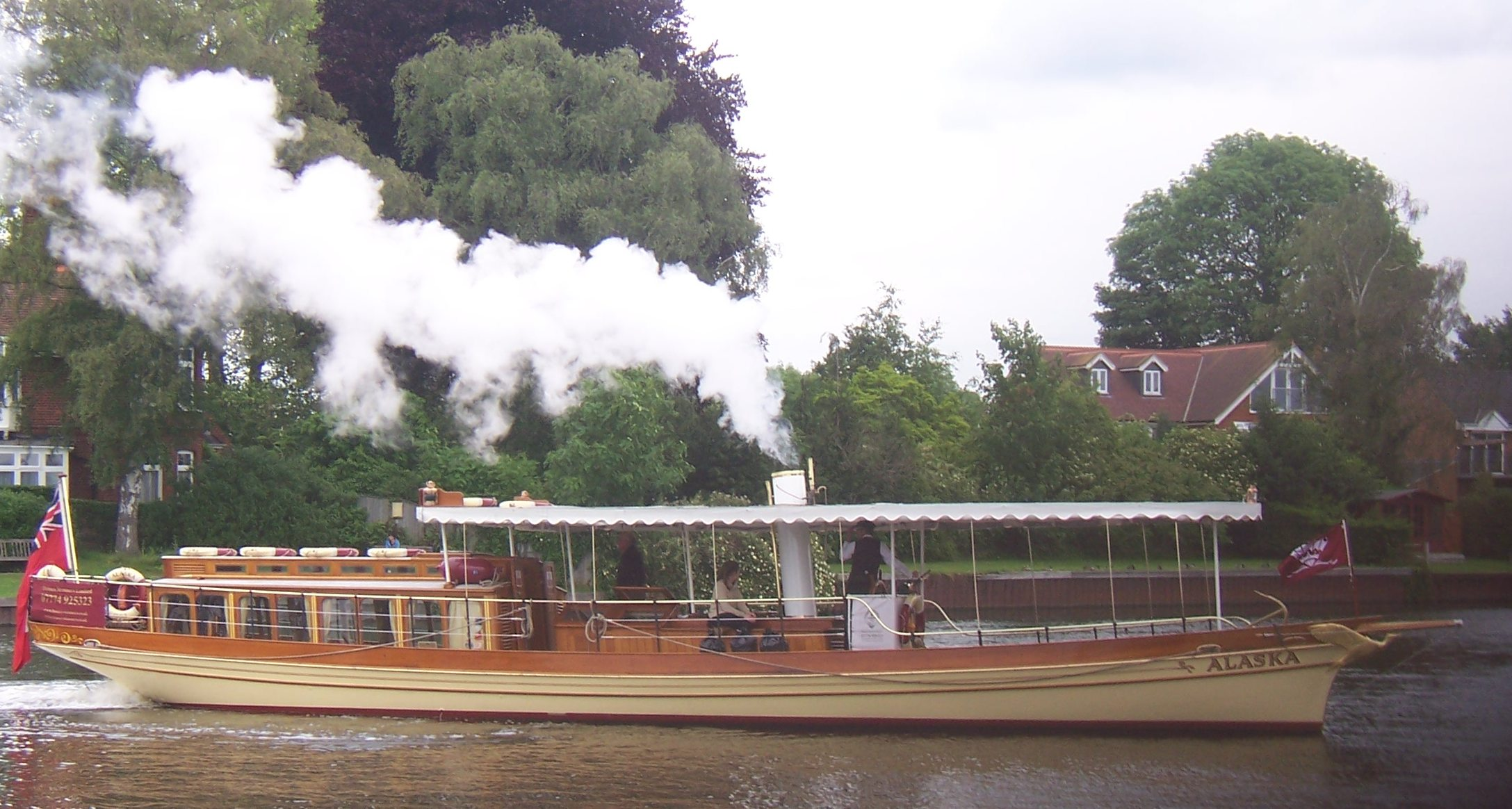
Alaska - one of the first steamers on the upper Thames

Numerous steamers took part in the 1000 boat float past for HM Queen Elizabeth II—a steam pinnace No. 438, SS Elizabethan, SS Edwardian, and the Fellowes, Morton, and Clayton narrow boat President. Salters steamers also took part. The tug Portwey was stationary near HMS Belfast and regaled the royal party with her whistle. Other steamers involved were the Yarmouth Belle, Alaska, Kennet, Kariat, Ursula, and Sabrina of Gloucester.

== See also ==
- John I. Thornycroft & Company
- Ramsgate tug
- William Watkins Ltd
- Yarrow Shipbuilders and Yarrows Boiler
- Gravesend–Tilbury Ferry
- Woolwich Free Ferry
- SS Wandle
- SS Cervia
- Salters Steamers

== Gallery ==
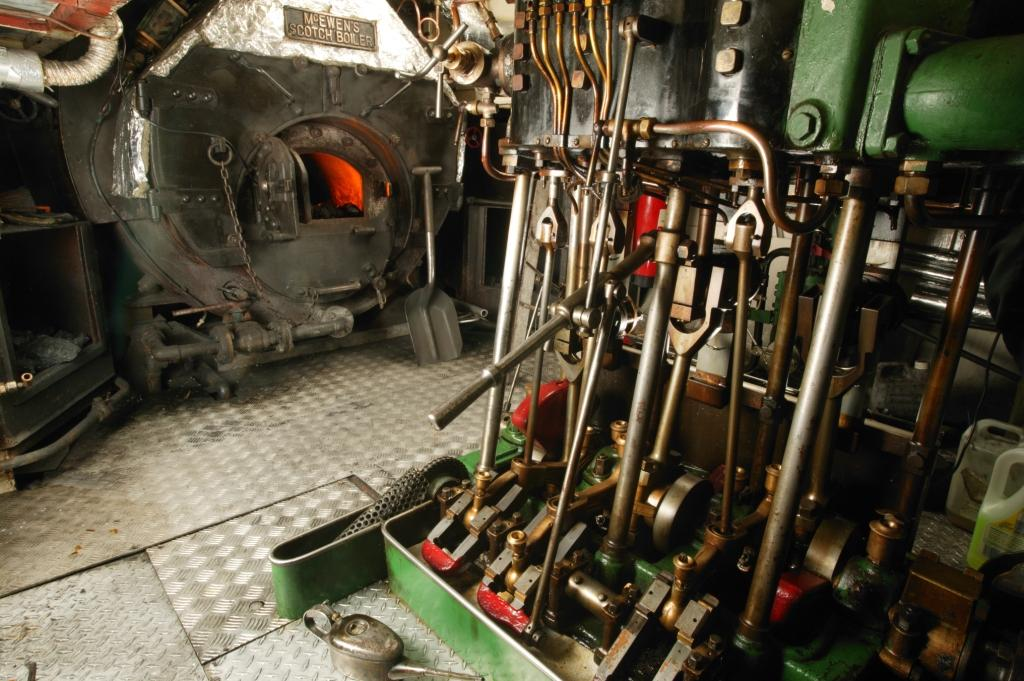
Sissons triple-expansion steam engine and coal-fired Scotch boiler, as installed in SL Nuneham

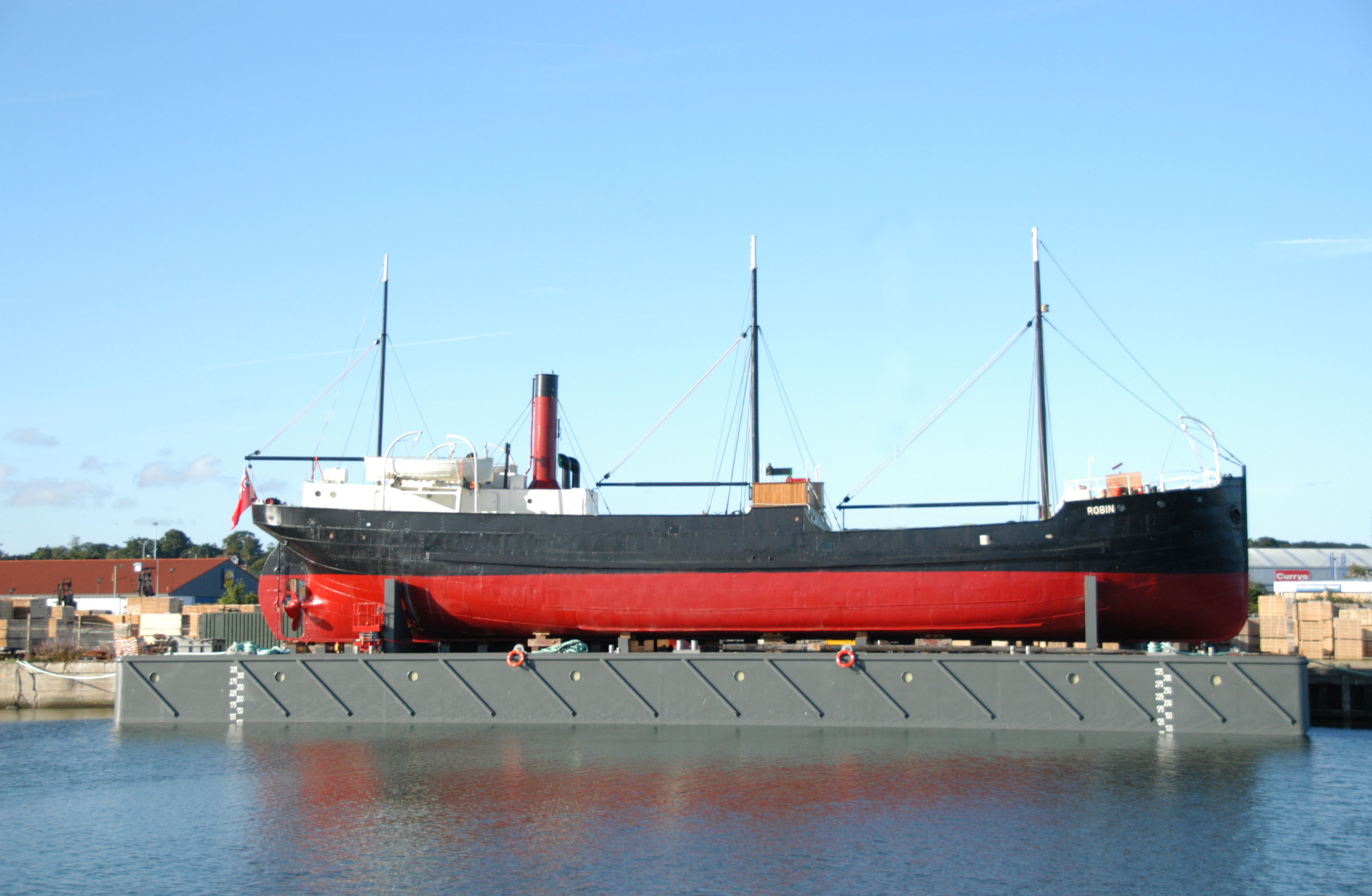
SS Robin September 2010, ready to leave Lowestoft

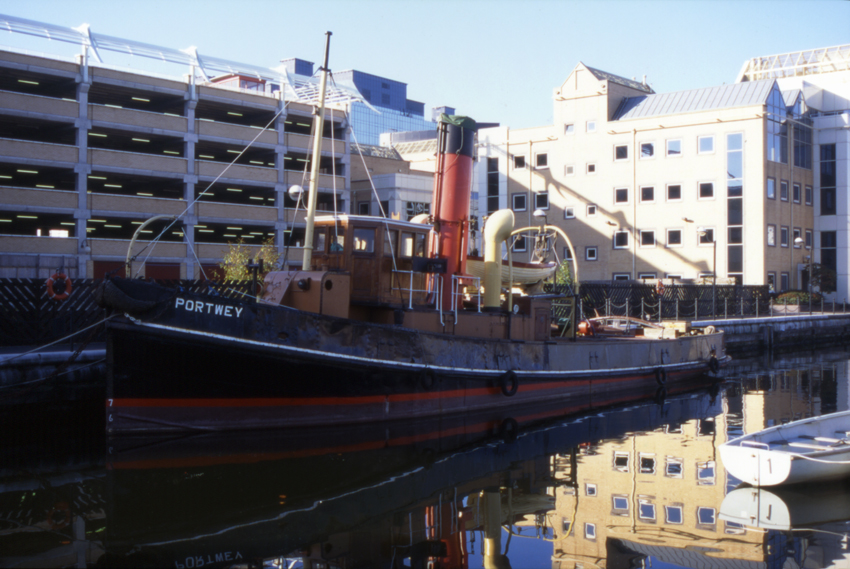
ST Portwey in West India Docks

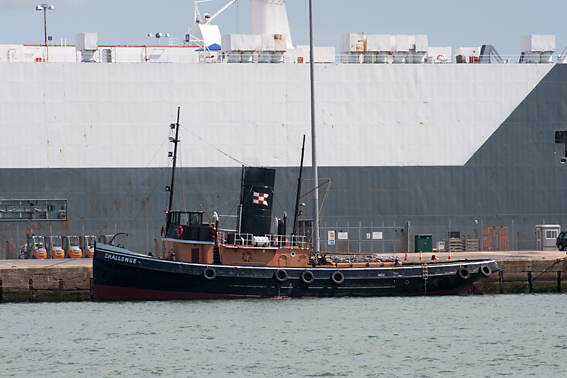
Tug Challenge, last steam tug to work on the Thames
