= Ramsgate tug =

The Ramsgate tugs were a series of tugboats used at Ramsgate harbour since the 19th century. In the 19th century the tugs were kept with "crew on board and steam up, ready to put to sea at a moment's notice".

The first Ramsgate tug, built of wood and measuring 90 tons (91 t), with a 50 horsepower (37 kW) engine, was built at South Shields by Woodhouse in 1843, and named the Samson.

The Samson and her successors—Aide, a wooden paddle steamer of 112 gross tons (114 t) built at Blackwall on the Thames and in use by 1855, Vulcan, an iron steam paddle tug of 140 tons (142 t), also built at Blackwall and delivered to Ramsgate in 1858, and Fabia, which was in service in World War II—participated in many rescues with locals, and received several rewards from the RNLI and grateful foreign governments. Another Ramsgate tug was Sun Swale.

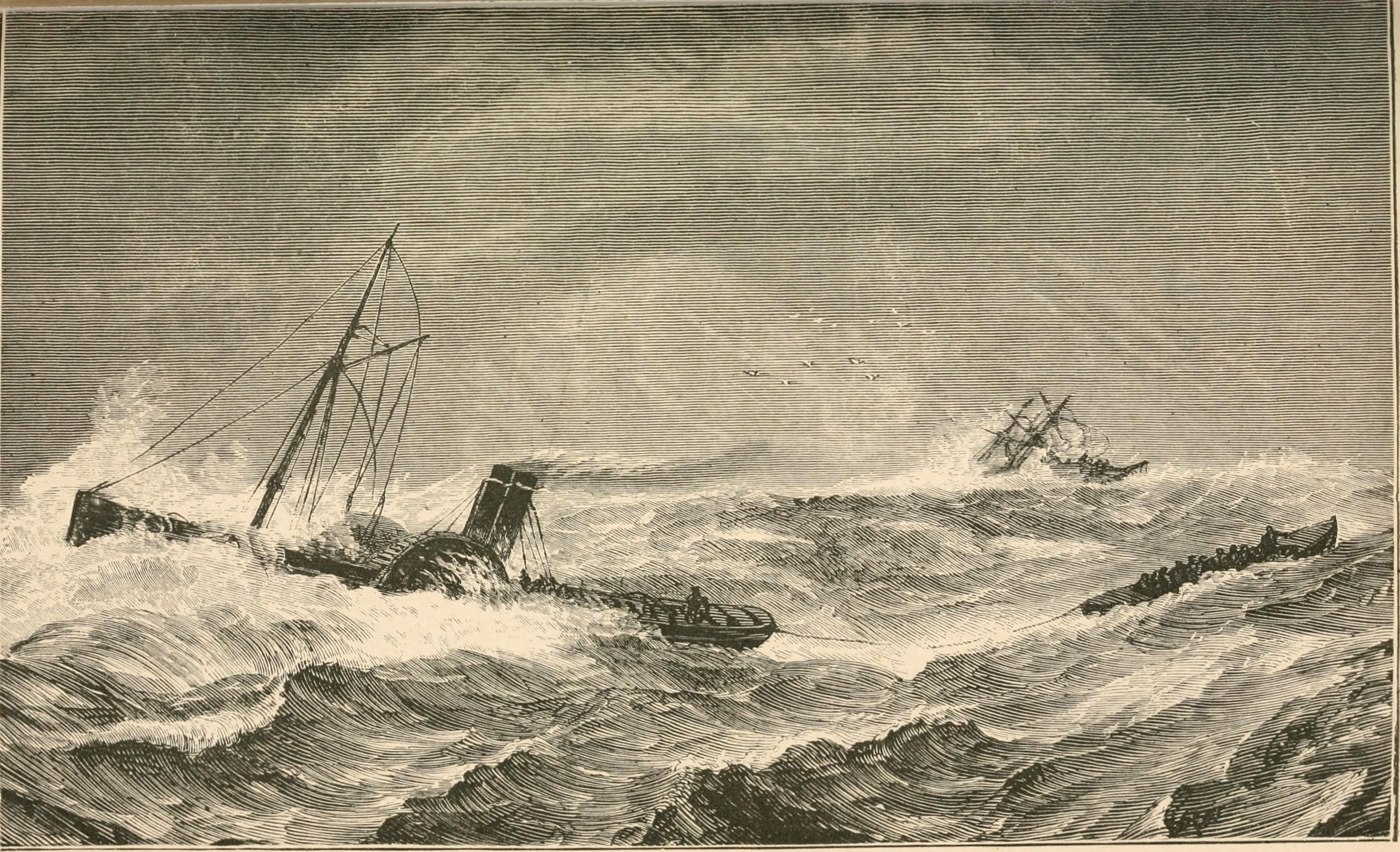
Wreck of the Indian Chief, and services of the Ramsgate Lifeboat

In January 1881 the Ramsgate tugs Vulcan and Aide participated with the lifeboat Bradford in the rescue of the Indian Chief, in response to which the Ramsgate harbour-master, Captain Braine, wrote the commendation, "Of all the meritorious services performed by the Ramsgate Tug and Life-boat, I consider this one of the best. The decision the coxswain and crew arrived at to remain till daylight, which was in effect to continue for fourteen hours cruising about with the sea continually breaking over them in a heavy gale and tremendous sea, proves, I consider, their gallantry and determination to do their duty."

== Cultural references ==
In Wilkie Collins's novel The Fallen Leaves a Broadstairs boatman laments that the advent of the Ramsgate tug destroyed the rich pickings to be made by salvaging cargo from wrecks on the Goodwin Sands.

William Broome painted two pictures featuring the Ramsgate tugs: The Ramsgate pulling and sailing lifeboat being towed by the tug 'Aide' through the harbour entrance in a fierce storm, going to the rescue of the 'Indian Chief' on the Goodwin Sands, held by the Royal National Lifeboat Institution Heritage Trust, and The tug 'Vulcan' towing a stricken vessel into Ramsgate with a lifeboat, held by the Maritime Museum in Ramsgate. Thomas H. Willoughby Beddowes painted 'And waited for dawn'; the Ramsgate lifeboat 'Bradford and the tug 'Vulcan' going to the rescue of the 'Indian Chief' off Long Sands, in the Royal National Lifeboat Institution Heritage Trust collection. George Mears painted The tug 'Vulcan' with the Ramsgate pulling and sailing lifeboat going to the wreck of the 'Indian Chief' and The return of the tug 'Vulcan' with the Ramsgate pulling and sailing lifeboat, returning to harbour with the rescued crew from the 'Indian Chief' both with the Royal National Lifeboat Institution Heritage Trust.
