= HNLMS Mulan =

World War II Dutch submarine tender

History

Netherlands
- Name: Mulan
- Builder: E.J. Smit & Zoon, Westerbroek
- Laid down: 1931
- Launched: 1931
- Commissioned: 11 May 1940 Royal Netherlands Navy
- Out of service: 28 Augustus 1940 Royal Netherlands Navy
- Renamed: 1956: Frida Blokzijl (Different owner); 1958: Ban Ho Hin (Different owner from Panama)
- Fate: Returned to owner 28 August 1940

General characteristics
- Type: Submarine tender
- Displacement: 249 t (245 long tons) standard
- Length: 37.5 m (123 ft 0 in)
- Beam: 6.54 m (21 ft 5 in)
- Draught: 2.48 m (8 ft 2 in)
- Installed power: 150 hp (110 kW)
- Propulsion: 1 × Stork diesel engine
- Speed: 8 knots (15 km/h; 9.2 mph)

HNLMS Mulan was originally a coastal transport vessel. The ship was requisitioned by the Royal Netherlands Navy after the start of the German invasion of the Netherlands to serve as a makeshift submarine tender.

== Service history ==
The coastal transport ship Mulan was requisitioned on 11 May 1940, one day after the start of World War II for the Netherlands. The Royal Netherlands Navy foresaw the need of additional submarine tenders in Dutch waters as the only other such ship was HNLMS Mercuur, causing them to requisition some civilian ships such as Mulan.

HNLMS Mulan was initially used to transport torpedoes, ammunition and required parts for the new cruiser HNLMS Jacob van Heemskerck from IJmuiden to Portsmouth. Once the Netherlands had fallen, the ship served as a submarine tender at Dundee, Scotland, before being returned to its owner on 28 August 1940.

After the war, the ship continued as a transport ship until being sold to a new owner in 1956 where it was renamed Frida Blokzijl. Two years later the ship was sold again to a new owner from Panama, being renamed to Ban Ho Hin and receiving a Panamanian registration.
