= Holland Steamship Company =

House flag of the Holland Steamship Company

The Holland Steamship Company (Dutch: Hollandsche Stoomboot Maatschappij, HSM) was formed in Amsterdam in 1885 to run a steamship service from Amsterdam to London.

== History ==
- 1827 – 70 ft. paddle steamer "Beurs van Amsterdam" of the Amsterdamsche Stoomboot Maatschappij served on an Amsterdam - London line for 1 year.
- 1849 - Amsterdam Screw Schooner Company sets up a service to London.
- 1885 - Hollandsche Stoomboot Maats. [ HSM ] or Holland Steamship Co. commenced operating with a one ship service which was doubled later that year when "Amstelstroom" was delivered.
- 1974 - Having discontinued passenger services after World War II, the company's many cargo vessels continued to trade until 1974 when finally operations ceased.

== Routes ==
- Passenger / Cargo : Amsterdam to London. Initially to Brewer's Quay but later transferring to Hay's Wharf also within the Pool of London. After World War I the service moved again within the Pool to Enderby's Wharf; and Amsterdam to Hull.
- Cargo : Amsterdam to Belfast / Bristol / Cardiff / Cork / Dublin / Fowey / Grangemouth / Shoreham / Swansea / Teignmouth / Waterford; and Flushing to Shoreham.

== Livery ==
Funnel: Yellow with black top.

== Passenger / Cargo Vessels employed ==
Ship	Launched	Tonnage (GRT)	Notes and references
IJstroom	1879	754	Purchased from Netherlands Steamship Co. in 1885 as "Fijenoord" and renamed "Ijstroom" starting the familiar naming pattern with the suffix 'stroom' (river) which all the company's vessels carried. Operated to London weekly, becoming twice weekly with the building of the "Amstelstroom".
Amstelstroom	1885	787	Built by Netherlands Steamship Co., at Rotterdam. Sold in 1905 to Greek interests and renamed "Irini", changing hands within Greece again in 1908 renamed "Spezia" and in 1913 renamed "Spetzai". Transferred to Hellenic Steam Navigation and lost during war but was raised and renamed "Spetsai". Became the "Volos" of A.K.Riggas in 1928, and that company was absorbed into Hellenic Coast Lines in 1930. Vessel sank on 7 December 1933 on passage from Piraeus to Savona.
Ijstroom	1898	960	Built by R.Thompson & Son at Sunderland and operated on the London service with "Maasstroom" delivering a twice weekly service. Sold in 1922 to Cie.Nav. France-Irlande and renamed "Banba" and was wrecked off the Newfoundland coast in July 1923 on passage from Sydney, Nova Scotia to Granville.
Maasstroom	1900	1,034	Near sister of "Ijstroom" (1898) built at Rijkee & Co., of Rotterdam and with a slightly increased GRT. Was damaged during an air raid on London during World War I and post war had her passenger capacity reduced to 12. Scrapped by Van Heyghen Freres at Ghent in February 1935.
Amstelstroom	1910	1,413	Built by Maats. Fijenoord of Rotterdam. Served both London and Hull from Amsterdam. Abandoned when damaged by gunfire from German torpedo boats in March 1917 and finally sunk by a torpedo from a German submarine close to the Nord Hinder L/V.
Zaanstroom	1913	1,657	Built by Rotterdam Drydock Co., at Rotterdam. Captured and taken to Zeebrugge by German submarine in March 1915 and eventually scuttled by German Navy in October 1918. Raised by Belgian interests and sold to Soc. Navale Charbonniere and renamed "Westland" in 1919. Sold on to S.S.M in 1922 and again to United Baltic Corporation in 1925 and renamed "Baltanic". Spent World War II mainly in New Zealand waters as a refrigerated feeder ship. Finally being sold to I.C.I. as a storage hulk for explosives in Loch Torridon. Broken up at Troon in May 1958.
Lingestroom	1917	1,480	Near sister of "Zaanstroom". Re-opened London service after World War I, but sold to Thesen's Steamships of Cape Town in 1937 being renamed "Griqua". Operated between Cape Town and the Belgian Congo as a passenger/cargo vessel until 1948 when she was sold to Colonial Steamships of Port Louis, Mauritius and renamed "Chamarel 2". Vessel capsized and sank after an explosion unloading petrol in Saint-Denis, Reunion in September 1949.

== Cargo only services ==
Outside of its passenger / cargo services, HSM operated cargo services to many ports around the coasts of the U.K. and Ireland - see 'Routes' above.

Passengers would occasionally be carried on these vessels but it was on an ad hoc basis.

A feature of the ships deployed on the London service was the mounting of deck cranes to facilitate speedy cargo handling.
