= PS Ipswich =

History
- Name: PS Ipswich
- Operator: 1864–1873: Great Eastern Railway
- Port of registry: (United Kingdom)
- Builder: James Ash, Cubitt Town, London
- Launched: 1864
- Out of service: 1873
- Fate: Withdrawn 1873

General characteristics
- Tonnage: 87 gross register tons (GRT)
- Length: 120.3 feet (36.7 m)
- Beam: 15 feet (4.6 m)
- Depth: 6.9 feet (2.1 m)

PS Ipswich was a passenger vessel built for the Great Eastern Railway in 1864.

== History ==
The ship was built by James Ash of Cubitt Town in London. She replaced the Eastern Counties ship Cardinal Wolsey on the Ipswich to Harwich service and made her maiden voyage on 25 August 1864.

On 9 August 1865 she was returning from Harwich at low tide, and got aground near Hog Highland. A passenger named Gibbons anxious to get home, hailed a boat with three boys on it, and the boat went alongside. Gibbons and his wife got in. The boys in their ignorance, went in front of the paddle wheels. This was not seen by the Captain, who as the boys were pushing off, gave the order to go ahead, and the paddle wheel turned and the boat was broken and its occupants thrown overboard. Gibbons swam ashore. One of the boys got into trouble, and Alfred Cornish jumped off the steamer to his rescue. Mrs Gibbons was also in a bad state, but recovered sufficiently to go home, but she died of inflammation of the lungs the next day.

She was withdrawn in 1873.
