= Kingston =

Kingston may refer to:

== Places ==
- List of places called Kingston
- Kingston, Jamaica, the capital of Jamaica
- Kingston, Ontario, a city in Ontario, Canada
- Kingston, New York, a city in New York
- Kingston (town), New York, a town in New York
- CFB Kingston, a Canadian Forces base in Kingston, Ontario
- RCAF Station Kingston, a World War II air training station at Collins Bay near Kingston, Ontario
- Kingston Brook, England
- Kingston Creek, California, United States
- Kingston upon Hull (commonly just Hull), Yorkshire, England
- Kingston upon Thames, a town in southwest London, England
- Kingston Harbour, Jamaica, a natural harbour
- Kingston Range, a mountain range in California
- Kingston, a community in Division No. 1, Subdivision G, Newfoundland and Labrador, Canada

== Music ==
- Kingston (New Zealand band), a New Zealand pop/rock band
- Kingston (duo), formerly Carter Twins, an American musical duo
- Kingston Maguire, known as Kingston, of hip hop duo Blue Sky Black Death
- The Kingston Trio, an American folk and pop music group
- "Kingston", a song by Sean Kingston from his 2007 debut self-titled album
- "Kingston", a song by Faye Webster from her 2018 album Atlanta Millionaires Club

== People ==
- Kingston (surname), including a list of people with the name
- Kingston Flemings (born 2007), American basketball player
- Kingston Nyamapfene, Zimbabwean agricultural professor and former vice chancellor of the University of Africa
- Kingston Pease, an 18th-century African-American property owner and prominent member of the free black community of Newport, Rhode Island
- Kofi Kingston and Kofi Nahaje Kingston, ring names of American professional wrestler Kofi Nahaje Sarkodie-Mensah (born 1981)

== Religion ==
- Roman Catholic Archdiocese of Kingston (Canada)
- Roman Catholic Archdiocese of Kingston in Jamaica
- Bishop of Kingston, a title of the Church of England

== Schools ==
- Kingston University, Kingston upon Thames, England
  - Kingston Business School
- Kingston College (disambiguation)
- Kingston High School (disambiguation)
- The Kingston Academy, a co-educational secondary free school located in the London Borough of Kingston upon Thames
- Kingston Grammar School, a private co-educational day school in Kingston upon Thames
- Kingston Collegiate and Vocational Institute, Kingston, Ontario, Canada, a former secondary school
- Kingston International School, co-educational bilingual international school in Kowloon Tong, Hong Kong

== Ships ==
- HMS Kingston, various Royal Navy ships
- Kingston-class coastal defence vessel, a Royal Canadian Navy ship class
  - HMCS Kingston, lead ship of the class
- List of ships named Kingston

== Sports ==
=== Teams ===
- Kingston Cricket Club, an 18th-century team in Kingston upon Thames, England
- Kingston FC, a former soccer team based in Kingston, Ontario, Canada
- Kingston Aces, a former pair of senior ice hockey teams based in Kingston, Ontario
- Kingston Canadians, a Canadian junior ice hockey team in the Ontario Hockey League from 1973 to 1988
- Kingston Clippers, a former Canadian semi-professional soccer club based in Kingston, Ontario
- Kingston Colonials, a former American basketball team, based in Kingston, New Jersey
- Kingston Colonials (baseball), a minor league team that played sporadically between 1885 and 1951
- Kingston Frontenacs, a Canadian major junior ice hockey team in the Ontario Hockey League, based in Kingston, Ontario
- Kingston Granites, a former football team from Kingston, Ontario
- Kingston Stockade FC, an American soccer team based in Kingston, New York
- Kingston Voyageurs, a former Junior "A" ice hockey team in Kingston, Ontario
- Kingston Wranglers, a junior ice hockey team in the United States Premier Hockey League

=== Competitions ===
- Kingston Regatta, a rowing regatta on the River Thames in England
- Kingston Stakes, an annual American Thoroughbred horse race run at Belmont Park
- Kingston International Championships, a clay court, later hard court, tennis tournament in Jamaica

=== Other sports ===
- Kingston (horse) (1884–1912), an American Thoroughbred racehorse
- Kingston Speedway, a former dirt oval raceway located in the Thousand Islands region of Ontario, Canada
- Kingston Stadium, a football stadium in Cedar Rapids, Iowa, United States

== Titles ==
- Earl of Kingston and Baron Kingston and Viscount Kingston, a title in the Peerage of Ireland
- Viscount Kingston, an extinct Scottish title and an extant Irish subsidiary title of the Earl of Kingston
- Baron Kingston, two titles in the Peerage of Ireland and one in the Peerage of the United Kingdom

== Transportation ==
- Kingston Airfield, Kingston, Ontario, Canada (1929–1942)
- Kingston Airport (disambiguation)
- Kingston Branch, a former major railway line in Southland, New Zealand
  - Kingston Flyer, a vintage steam train which uses a section of preserved track on the Kingston Branch
- Kingston Bypass, a highway in Kingston, Tasmania, Australia
- Kingston Bridge (disambiguation)
- Kingston bus stations, two stations in London
- Kingston Bus Terminal, Kingston, Ontario
- Kingston Subdivision, a major Canadian National Railway line connecting Montreal with Toronto
- Kingston Interchange, Hobart, Tasmania, Australia
- Kingston Road (disambiguation)
- Kingston Line, a commuter rail line in Massachusetts, United States
- Kingston loop line, a railway line in London
- Kingston Pike, a highway in Tennessee, United States
- Kingston SE railway line, South Australia, a former line
- Kingston station (disambiguation)
- English Electric Kingston, a British biplane flying boat first flown in 1924

== Other uses ==
- Kingston (biscuit), an Australian sweet biscuit
- Battle of Kingston, an 1863 American Civil War battle fought at Kingston, Tennessee
- Kingston Technology, an American multinational computer technology corporation
- Kingston Shipyards, a Canadian shipbuilder and ship repair company from 1910 to 1968, based in Kingston, Ontario
- Kingston (Upper Marlboro, Maryland), a historic home in the United States
- Kingston Penitentiary, a former maximum security prison in Kingston, Ontario, Canada
- HM Prison Kingston, former prison in Portsmouth, England
- Kingston (film), a 2025 Indian Tamil-language film
- Kingston parakeets, feral parakeets in the UK

== See also ==
- Kingston Formation, a geologic formation in England
- Kingston Fortifications, 19th century defensive works in Kingston, Ontario, Canada
- Kingston Hill (disambiguation)
- Kingston House (disambiguation)
- Kingston courthouse shooting, a 2005 incident in Kingston, Tennessee, U.S.
- Kingston: Confidential, an American TV drama
- Kingston v Preston, an English contract law case
- Kingston valve, fitted in the bottom of a ship
- Duke of Kingston-upon-Hull, a title in the Peerage of Great Britain, and Earl of Kingston-upon-Hull, a title in the Peerage of England
- Kingstone (disambiguation)
- Kington (disambiguation)
- Kingtown (disambiguation)
- Kingstown (disambiguation)
- Kinston (disambiguation)
