= List of places called Kingston =

Kingston is the name of numerous places in the world:

== Australia ==
=== South Australia ===
- Kingston District Council, a local government area in South Australia
- Kingston SE, a coastal town in South Australia
- Kingston On Murray, South Australia
- Division of Kingston, a federal electoral district in South Australia covering southern Adelaide suburbs

=== Victoria ===
- Kingston, Victoria, a town
- City of Kingston, a local government area in Victoria

=== Other regions ===
- Kingston, Australian Capital Territory, a suburb of Canberra
- Kingston, Norfolk Island, capital of the territory
- Kingston, Queensland, a suburb of Logan City
- Kingston, Tasmania, a town
- Kingston, Western Australia, a locality

== Canada ==
- Kingston, New Brunswick, an unincorporated community
  - Kingston Parish, New Brunswick
  - Kingston Peninsula
- Kingston, Newfoundland and Labrador
- Kingston, Nova Scotia, a village
- Kingston, Ontario, the largest city of this name in Canada
  - Kingston, Ontario Inner Harbour
  - Kingston (federal electoral district), a former federal district in Ontario
  - Kingston (provincial electoral district), a former riding in Ontario
  - Kingston (Province of Canada electoral district), a pre-Confederation riding in the Province of Canada
  - Kingston City, a federal electoral district
  - Kingston Township, now part of the city of Kingston, Ontario
- Kingston, Prince Edward Island, a municipality

== Guyana ==
- Kingston, Guyana, a ward of Georgetown

== Jamaica ==
- Kingston, Jamaica, capital of the country
  - Kingston Parish

== New Zealand ==
- Kingston, New Zealand, a town
- Kingston, Wellington, a suburb of Wellington

== United Kingdom ==
=== England ===
- Kingston, Milton Keynes, Buckinghamshire, a district
- Kingston, Cambridgeshire, a village and parish
- Kingston, Devon, near Modbury
- Kingston, East Devon, a location in Devon
- Kingston, Kingswear, a location in Devon
- Kingston, Staverton, Devon, a historic estate
- Kingston, North Dorset, a hamlet in Hazelbury Bryan
- Kingston, Purbeck, Dorset, a village
- Kingston upon Hull (commonly just Hull), East Riding of Yorkshire
- Kingston near Lewes, East Sussex, a village and civil parish
- Kingston upon Thames, Greater London (formerly Surrey), a town
  - Kingston Vale with Kingston Hill, a district in the borough
  - Kingston-upon-Thames (UK Parliament constituency)
  - Kingston upon Thames (parish)
  - Royal Borough of Kingston upon Thames
  - Kingston and Surbiton (UK Parliament constituency)
  - Kingston Town (ward)
- Kingston, Greater Manchester, a location
- Kingston, Hampshire, a residential area of the city of Portsmouth
- Kingston, West Hampshire, a location
- Kingston, Isle of Wight, a settlement and former civil parish
- Kingston, Kent, a village and civil parish
- Kingston Bagpuize, Oxfordshire (formerly in Berkshire), a village
- Kingston Blount, Oxfordshire, a village
- Kingston Lisle, Oxfordshire, a village and civil parish
- Kingston, Suffolk, a location
- Kingston by Ferring (and Kingston Gorse), Arun District, West Sussex, a civil parish
- Kingston by Sea (or Kingston Buci), Adur District, West Sussex
  - Kingston Buci, an electoral district
- Kingston on Soar, Nottinghamshire, a village and civil parish
- Kingston Seymour, Somerset, a village and civil parish
- Kingston St Mary, Somerset, a village and civil parish
- Collingbourne Kingston, Wiltshire, a village and civil parish

=== Scotland ===
- Kingston, East Lothian, a hamlet
- Kingston, Glasgow, a district of Glasgow
- Kingston, Moray, a village

== United States ==
- Kingston, Autauga County, Alabama, an unincorporated community
- Kingston, Arkansas, an unincorporated community and census-designated place
- Kingston, California, a former town
- Kingston, Fresno County, California, a former town
- Kingston, Georgia, a village
- Kingston, Idaho, an unincorporated community
- Kingston, Illinois, a village
- Kingston, Adams County, Illinois
- Kingston, Indiana, an unincorporated community
- Kingston, Iowa, an unincorporated community and census-designated place
- Kingston, Kentucky, an unincorporated community
- Kingston, Louisiana, an unincorporated community
- Kingston, Maryland, an unincorporated community
- Kingston (Upper Marlboro, Maryland)
- Kingston, Massachusetts, a town
  - Kingston (CDP), Massachusetts, a census-designated place within the town
- Kingston, Michigan, a village
- Kingston, Minnesota, a city
- Kingston, Mississippi, an unincorporated community
- Kingston, Missouri, a city
- Kingston, New Jersey, an unincorporated community and census-designated place
- Kingston, Nevada, an unincorporated town and census-designated place
- Kingston, New Hampshire, a town
- Kingston, New Mexico, a census-designated place
- Kingston, New York, a city, county seat and original capital of the state of New York
- Kingston (town), New York
- Kingston, Ohio, a village
- Kingston, Oklahoma, a town
- Kingston, Oregon, an unincorporated community
- Kingston, Pennsylvania, a borough
- Kingston, Rhode Island, a village and a census-designated place
- Kingston, Tennessee, a city and county seat
- Kingston, Texas, an unincorporated community
- Kingston, Utah, a town
- Kingston, Washington, an unincorporated community and census-designated place
- Kingston, West Virginia , an unincorporated community and coal town
- Kingston, Green Lake County, Wisconsin, a town
  - Kingston, Wisconsin, a village within the town
- Kingston, Juneau County, Wisconsin, a town
- Kingston Township (disambiguation)

== See also ==
- East Kingston (disambiguation)
- West Kingston (disambiguation)
- Kingston (disambiguation)
- Kingstone (disambiguation)
- Kington (disambiguation)
- Kingtown (disambiguation)
- Kingstown (disambiguation)
- Kinston (disambiguation)
