= Kingtown =

Kingtown may refer to the following places in the United States:

- Kingtown, Arkansas, unincorporated community in Phillips County
- Kingtown, New Jersey, unincorporated community in Hunterdon County

== See also ==
- Kingston (disambiguation)
- Kingstone (disambiguation)
- Kington (disambiguation)
- Kingstown (disambiguation)
- Kinston (disambiguation)
