= Kinston =

Kinston may refer to:

- Kinston, Alabama
- Kinston, North Carolina (Kingston until 1784)
- Kinston Akomeng Kissi (born 1957), Ghanaian politician
- Warren Kinston (born 1945), Australian scientist

== See also ==
- Kingstone, Somerset
- Kingston (disambiguation)
- Kingston Bridge (disambiguation)
- Kington (disambiguation)
- Kingstown (disambiguation)
