= Kingston Town =

Kingston Town may refer to:

- Kingston Town (horse) (1976–1991), an Australian Thoroughbred racehorse
- "Kingston Town" (song), by Lord Creator, 1970, covered by UB40 in 1989
- List of places called Kingston
  - Kingston, Jamaica
- Kingston Town (ward), London, England

== See also ==
- Kingston (disambiguation)
- "Jamaica Farewell", a song by Lord Burgess made famous by Harry Belafonte
