= Sarah K =

Kenyan gospel musician (born 1971)

- Born: Sarah Njeri Kiarie; 30 April 1971 (age 55); Buruburu, Nairobi
- Education: Doctorate in Music Ministry (Honorary)
- Known for: Uniting believers weekly through worship
- Spouse: Rev. Samuel Mwangi Thubi
- Children: 3
- Awards: Groove Award

Sarah Njeri Kiarie (born 30 April 1971) popularly known as Sarah K, is a Kenyan gospel musician whose voice has earned her national and international recognition. She was awarded the Groove Award for the female artist of the Year in 2014.

She is the founder and leader of Back to the root of worship Ministry (BTR) and the popular Tuesday Worship Moments at the Nairobi Film Centre, a weekly worship gathering that brings together a large community of Christians both locally and internationally.

== Early life and education ==
Sarah K was born in Buruburu, Kenya on 30 April 1971. She was raised in an Akurinu family and she is the first born in her family.

She started her primary education at Baba Ndogo Primary School, later attended Kifufuti Primary School in Kiambu and eventually completed her primary school in Loitoktok, a town along the Kenya-Tanzania border. While in form three at St Valentine High School in Machakos, Sarah had to drop out of school to take care of her younger siblings due to family challenges. Though her early life was marked by challenges, she remained determined to pursue her calling in ministry. She focused on vocational training in dressmaking and sought practical skills to support her young family.

She received an Honorary Doctorate in Music Ministry. This recognition was bestowed upon her in August 2021 by the Brekford University and the Theological Seminary of the United States. This doctorate was awarded in honor of her three decades of consistent service in the gospel industry and her global impact as a worship leader. Her academic journey reflects a transition from humble vocational aspirations to becoming a respected figure in theological and musical circles.

Her early life was defined by a foundation in Christian faith, leading her to join the church praise and worship team as a young teenager. The cultural diversity of her childhood environment eventually shaped her unique musical style, which blends traditional worship with contemporary African sounds.

== Career and ministry life ==
She started as a backup singer, then began leading worship songs in church at an early age. It was in church that she discovered her musical talent and became the praise and worship leader at an Anglican church.

Her commitment to her calling was so strong that she used her college savings and financial support from her then-fiancé, Samuel Mwangi, to record her debut album, Ebenezer, in 1991. Her breakthrough arrived with the hit song "Liseme", which transformed her from a local singer into a nationally recognized gospel minister and established her as a powerful voice in gospel music. The popularity of her music grew, her songs were even played on KBC radio. She is widely celebrated across East Africa and the international Christian community for her vocals and influential worship ministry.

She has been active since the early 1990s and to this far she has written over 100 songs. Over the years, she has been recognized for her contributions to gospel music and ministry.

== Family life ==
She married Rev, Maj Samuel Mwangi Thubi of the Anglican Church of Kenya (ACK) on April 11,1992, and they had three children: Patricia, Meshack, and Caleb. She is also a spiritual mother to many sons daughters.

== Albums ==
- Nimekuja Kusema
- Unaitwa Jehovah
- Jina Lako
- Worship Moments (feat. Shachah Team) (2025)

== Awards and recognition ==
- Groove Award for Female Artist of the Year in 2014.
- Honorary doctorate in recognition of her impact on music and worship leadership in 2021.
- The Music Society of Kenya feted her in the Shujaa Award category for her exemplary contribution to the arts.
