= RCAF Station Kingston =

Canadian Second World War air training station

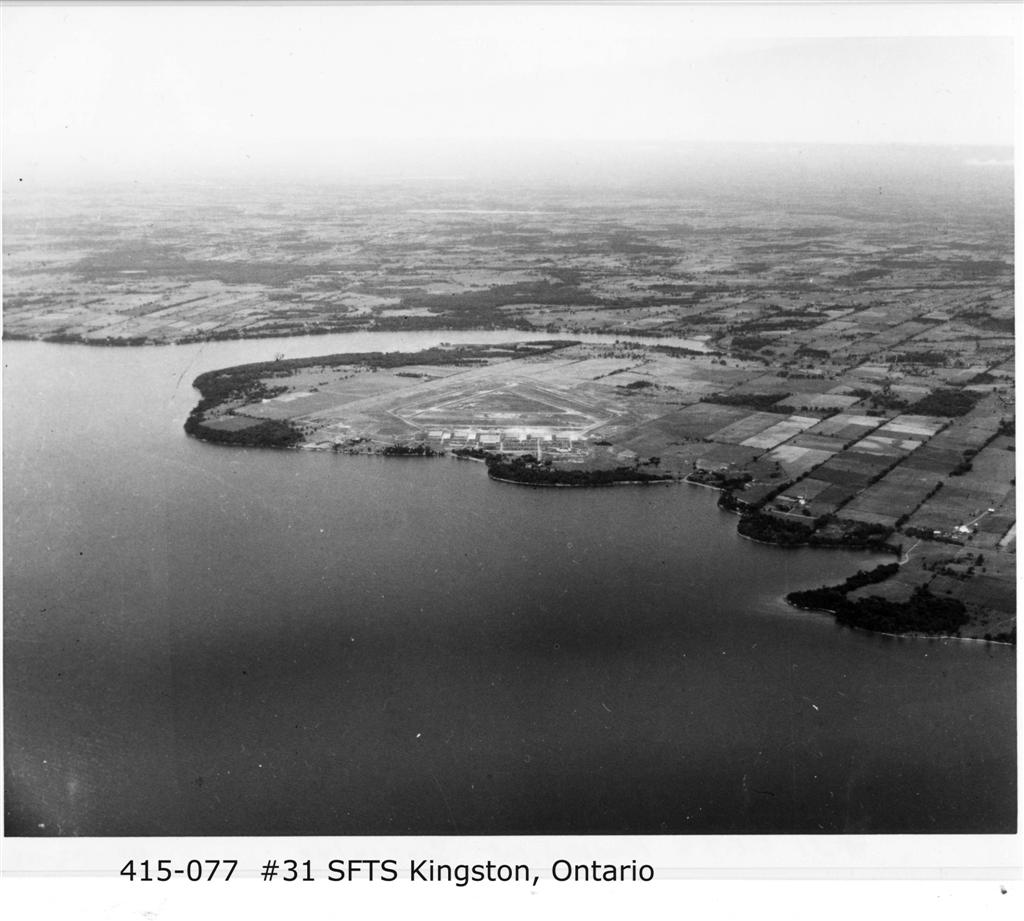
- The airfield during World War II
- Active: 7 October 1940 – 7 September 1945
- Country: Canada
- Branch: Royal Air Force; Royal Canadian Air Force
- Role: British Commonwealth Air Training Plan; Aircrew training
- Part of: No. 1 Training Command
- Schools: No. 31 Service Flying Training School; No. 14 Service Flying Training School
- Station Magazine: The Pioneer

Aircraft flown
- Trainer: Fairey Battle; North American Yale; North American Harvard

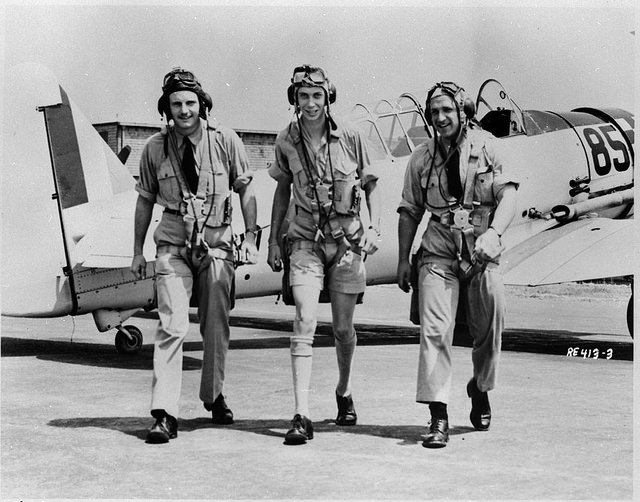
Pilots at RAF No.31 SFTS in 1943

RCAF Station Kingston was a World War II air training station built in 1940 at Collins Bay near Kingston, Ontario, Canada. The station was originally built by the Royal Canadian Air Force (RCAF) for use by the Royal Air Force (RAF). Like other RAF schools in Canada, it was subject to RCAF administrative and operational control.

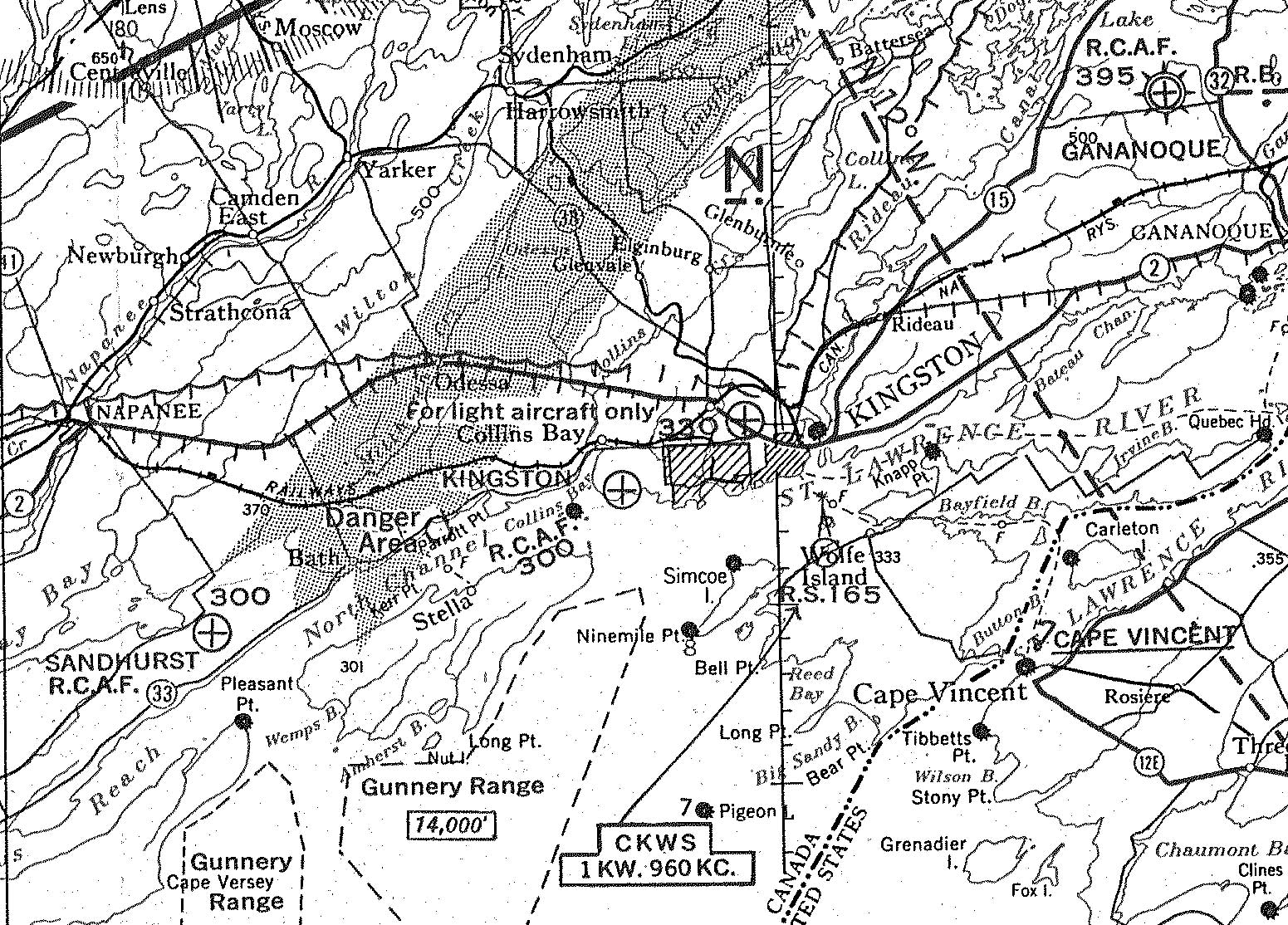
1943 Navigation chart showing RCAF Kingston and surrounding area. North is up, Lake Ontario at bottom.

== History ==
No. 31 Service Flying Training School (SFTS) was the first British Service Flying Training school to be established in Canada and the first flying training school at Kingston. The school was originally No. 7 Service Flying School based in Peterborough, England. Its main purpose was to train pilots for the Fleet Air Arm, but in the beginning the school's first students were British Commonwealth Air Training Plan (BCATP) trainees selected for service with the RCAF and RAF. Naval trainees, however, made up the majority of the trainees by the end of December 1940. Pilots were trained on Fairey Battles, which were shipped from England, and later, Harvards.

In 1942, the school formally became part of the British Commonwealth Air Training Plan. In 1944 No. 31 SFTS was merged with the RCAF's No. 14 SFTS when this school was transferred to Kingston from RCAF Station Aylmer. Aircraft used by No. 14 SFTS included Harvards, Yales and Ansons. No. 14 SFTS closed down in September 1945. Relief landing fields were located at Gananoque and Sandhurst, Ontario.

The aerodrome has been improved over the years and is now the Kingston/Norman Rogers Airport.

== Aerodrome information ==
The airfield was constructed in a typical BCATP wartime pattern, with six runways formed in an overlaid triangle. In approximately 1942 the aerodrome was listed at 44°13′N 76°36′W with a Var. 14 degrees W and elevation of 300 feet (91 m). Six runways were listed as follows:

Runway Name	Length	Width	Surface
1/19	2,500 feet (762 m)	100 feet (30 m)	Hard surfaced
1/19	3,000 feet (914 m)	100 feet (30 m)	Hard surfaced
7/25	2,800 feet (853 m)	100 feet (30 m)	Hard surfaced
7/25	2,600 feet (792 m)	100 feet (30 m)	Hard surfaced
13/31	2,550 feet (777 m)	100 feet (30 m)	Hard surfaced
13/31	2,500 feet (762 m)	100 feet (30 m)	Hard surfaced

== Relief landing field - Sandhurst ==
In approximately 1942 the aerodrome was listed at 44°09′N 76°52′W with a Var. 11.5 degrees W and elevation of 300 feet (91 m). The runway was listed as a "Turf - All-way field with dimensional data as follows:

Runway Name	Length	Width	Surface
N/S	2,780 feet (847 m)	1,000 feet (305 m)	Turf
NE/SW	3,150 feet (960 m)	1,000 feet (305 m)	Turf
NW/SE	2,820 feet (860 m)	1,000 feet (305 m)	Turf

== Notable aircrew ==
Some of the more noteworthy pilots who trained at this station include:

- David Clarabut, RNVR(A) who earned a Distinguished Service Cross (DSC) for his role on the attack on the German battleship Tirpitz
- Robert Hampton Gray, VC, DSC, RCNVR, Canada's last Victoria Cross recipient of the Second World War
- Gordon Cheeseman Edwards, RCNVR Mentioned in Despatches for the attacks on the Tirpitz
- Philip Steele Foulds, RCNVR who earned a DSC for his role in an attack on an enemy convoy

== Remembrance ==
Forty-nine airmen lost their lives while serving at Kingston, most in flying accidents. Three of these men, A/LA Moore, J.C., Lieut. Edwards, R.C., and A/LA Scorrow, E., perished when their aircraft crashed in Lake Ontario, and as of 2014 they have not been recovered.

== See also ==
- Kingston Airfield
- HMCS Cataraqui
