= Church of St John the Evangelist and All Saints, Kingstone =

Church in Somerset, England

Church of St John the Evangelist and All Saints
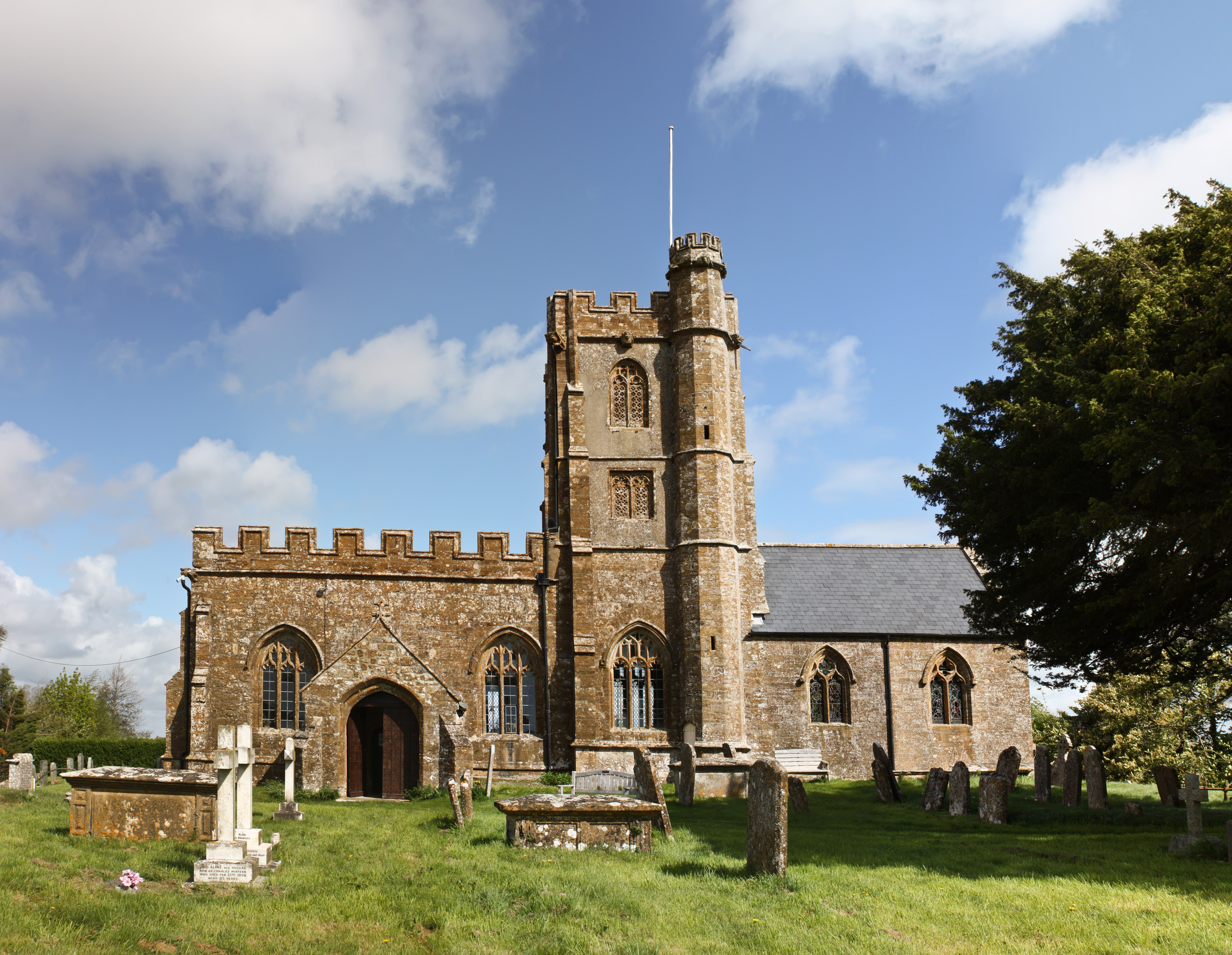

- Location within Somerset
- 50.9188°N 2.8851°W
- Location: Kingstone, Somerset, England

History
- Built: 14th century

Listed Building – Grade II*
- Official name: Church of St John the Evangelist and All Saints
- Designated: 4 February 1958
- Reference no.: 1057025

The Anglican Church of St John the Evangelist and All Saints in Kingstone, Somerset, England was built in the 14th century. It is a Grade II* listed building.

== History ==
A church was recorded on the site in 1291. Parts of the current building are 14th century, including the chancel and porch, while the rest is from the 15th century.

The parish is part of the Winsmoor benefice within the Diocese of Bath and Wells.

== Architecture ==
The hamstone building has a slate roof. It consist of a three-bay nave and two-bay chancel. The central three-stage tower is supported by offset buttresses. It contains a peal of six bells, the oldest of which date from the 1690s.

Most of the fittings inside the church are from the 19th century but it does have a 15th-century font. There are fragments of medieval stained glass.

== See also ==
- List of ecclesiastical parishes in the Diocese of Bath and Wells
