= Kingstone =

Kingstone may refer to:

== Places ==
- Kingstone, Herefordshire (near Hereford)
  - Kingstone High School
- Kingstone, Weston under Penyard, a hamlet in Weston under Penyard, Herefordshire
- Kingstone, Somerset
- Kingstone, South Yorkshire, an area in the Metropolitan Borough of Barnsley
  - The Kingstone School, a defunct secondary school
- Kingstone, Staffordshire

== People ==
- Charles Kingstone (1895–1960), New Zealand rugby union footballer and cricketer
- Fanaura Kingstone (born 1940), Cook Islands politician
- James Kingstone (born 1982), English cricketer
- James Joseph Kingstone (1892–1966), British Army officer of World Wars I and II
- Kingstone Mutandwa (born 2003), Zambian footballer

== Other uses ==
- Kingstone Companies, an American insurance provider

== See also ==
- Kingston (disambiguation)
