= Kingston Airport =

Kingston Airport may refer to:

- Kingston Airport (Nevada), Kingston, Nevada, United States
- Kingston Norman Rogers Airport, Kingston, Ontario, Canada

== See also ==
- Kingston-Ulster Airport, Kingston, New York, United States
- Norman Manley International Airport, Kingston, Jamaica
- Kingston/Riverland Aerodrome, near Kingston, Ontario, Canada
- Kingston Water Aerodrome, Lake Ontario, near Kingston
