= Kingston College =

Kingston College may refer to:

- Kingston College (Queensland), Logan City, Australia
- Kingston College (British Columbia), Canada
- Kingston Bible College, an Independent Fundamental Baptist College in Kingston, Nova Scotia, Canada
- Kingston College, part of South Thames Colleges Group, London
- Kingston Law College, Berunanpukuria, West Bengal, India
- Kingston College (Jamaica), Jamaica
- Kingston College (Chile), Concepción, Chile
- Kingston College of Art, a former name of Kingston School of Art, London
- Kingston College of Science, India
