= Kingston station =

Kingston station may refer to:

== Australia ==
- Kingston railway station, Brisbane
- Kingston railway station, Victoria
- Canberra railway station, Australian Capital Territory (locally known as Kingston station)

== Canada ==
- Kingston station (Ontario)
- Kingston Bus Terminal, Ontario, Canada

== Jamaica ==
- Kingston railway station, Jamaica

== New Zealand ==
- Kingston railway station, New Zealand, on the Kingston Branch

== United Kingdom ==
- Kingston railway station (England)
- Kingston railway station (1838–1852), the original name of Surbiton railway station
- Kingston Junction railway station, a former name of Surbiton railway station
- Surbiton and Kingston railway station, a former name of Surbiton railway station

== United States ==
- Kingston station (Massachusetts)
- In Kingston, New York:
  - Kingston station (Catskill Mountain Railroad)
  - Kingston station (New York, Ontario and Western Railroad)
  - Union Station (Kingston, New York), the main station in the town
- Kingston station (Pennsylvania), on the Ligonier Valley Railroad
- Kingston station (Rhode Island)

== See also ==
- List of places called Kingston
