= Kingston Road =

Kingston Road may refer to:

- Kingston Road, London, England
- Kingston Road, Oxford, England
- Kingston Road (Toronto), Canada
- Durham Regional Highway 2, the continuation of the Toronto Kingston Road into Durham Region

== See also ==
- Kingston Bridge (disambiguation)
