= RCAF Detachment Gananoque =

Former Canadian military airfield

- Gananoque, Ontario; Near Gananoque, Ontario in Canada
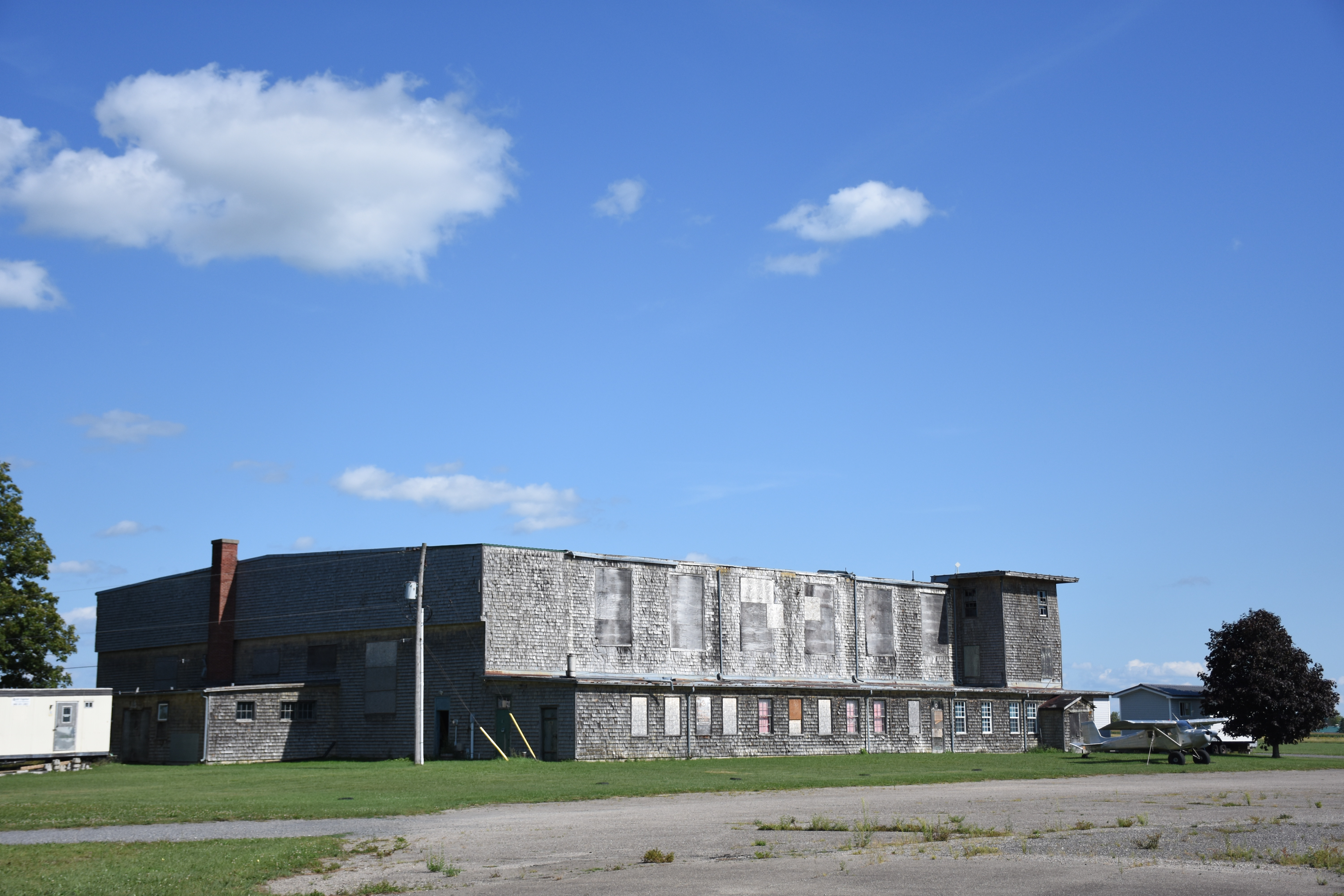
- The hangar in 2020

Site information
- Owner: Department of National Defence(Canada)
- Operator: Formerly Royal Canadian Air Force
- Controlled by: No. 31 Service Flying Training School (SFTS) located at RCAF Kingston

Location
- Location within Ontario

Site history
- In use: 1940–1945

Airfield information
- Identifiers: IATA: none, ICAO: none
- Elevation: 395 ft (120 m) AMSL
Runways
Direction	Length and surface
5/23	2,400 ft (730 m) Hard Surface
17/35	2,400 ft (730 m) Hard Surface
12/30	2,400 ft (730 m) Hard Surface

RCAF Detachment Gananoque was a relief landing field for the Royal Air Force's No. 31 Service Flying Training School (SFTS) located at RCAF Station Kingston during the Second World War. The airfield was located north of Gananoque, Ontario, Canada. Gananoque consisted of a triangle-shaped runway pattern, one hangar, and a control tower. Gananoque officially became a British Commonwealth Air Training Plan (BCATP) facility in 1942 when RAF training schools became part of the BCATP. The station opened in 1940 and closed in 1945.

The airfield was constructed in a typical BCATP wartime pattern, with three runways formed in a triangle. In approximately 1942 the aerodrome was listed at 44°24′N 76°15′W with a variation of 12 degrees west and elevation of 395 ft (120 m). Three runways were listed as follows:

Runway Name	Length	Width	Surface
5/23	2,400 ft (730 m)	100 ft (30 m)	Hard surfaced
17/35	2,400 ft (730 m)	100 ft (30 m)	Hard surfaced
12/30	2,400 ft (730 m)	100 ft (30 m)	Hard surfaced

Today, the former station is operated as the Gananoque Airport.

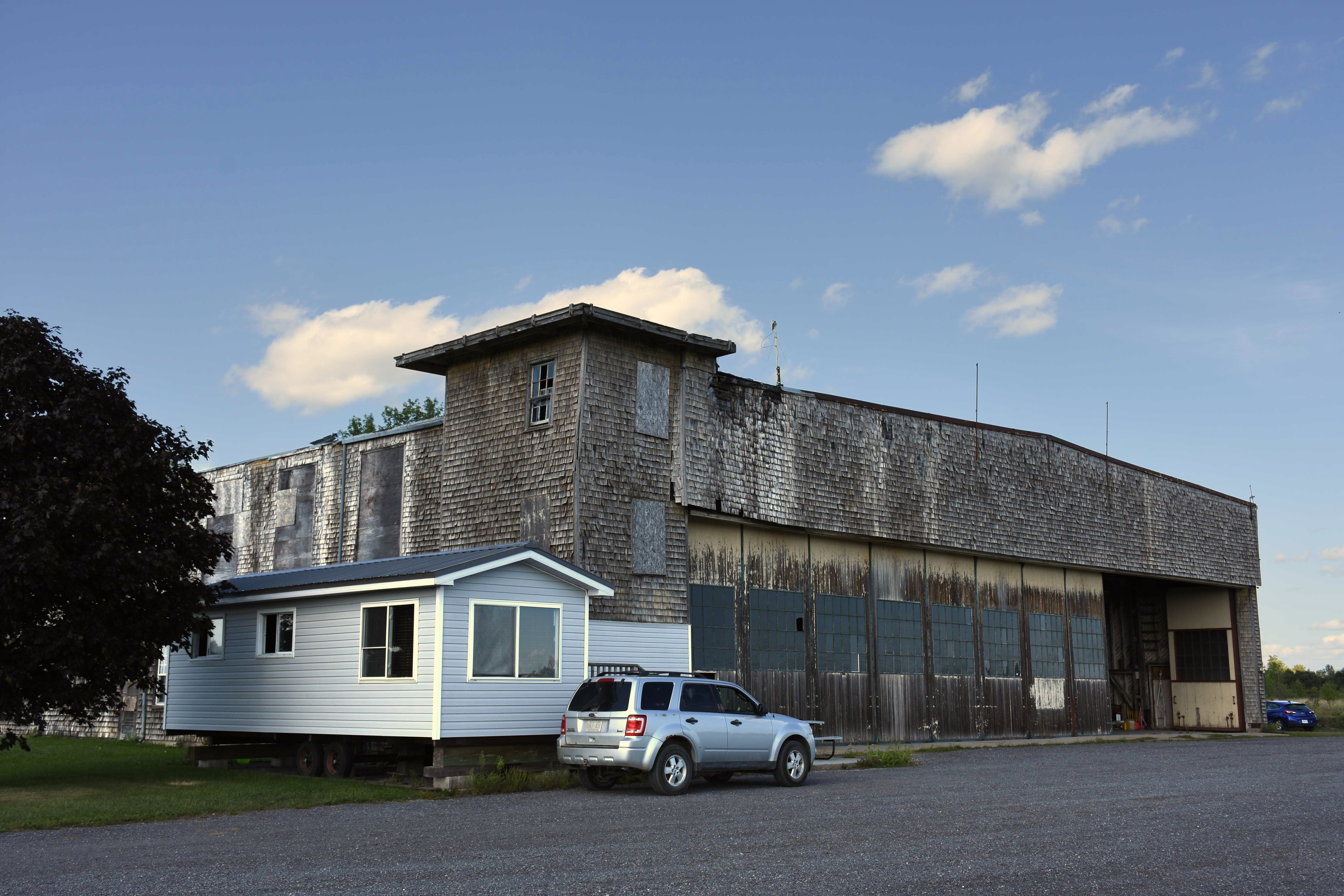
Hangar Door

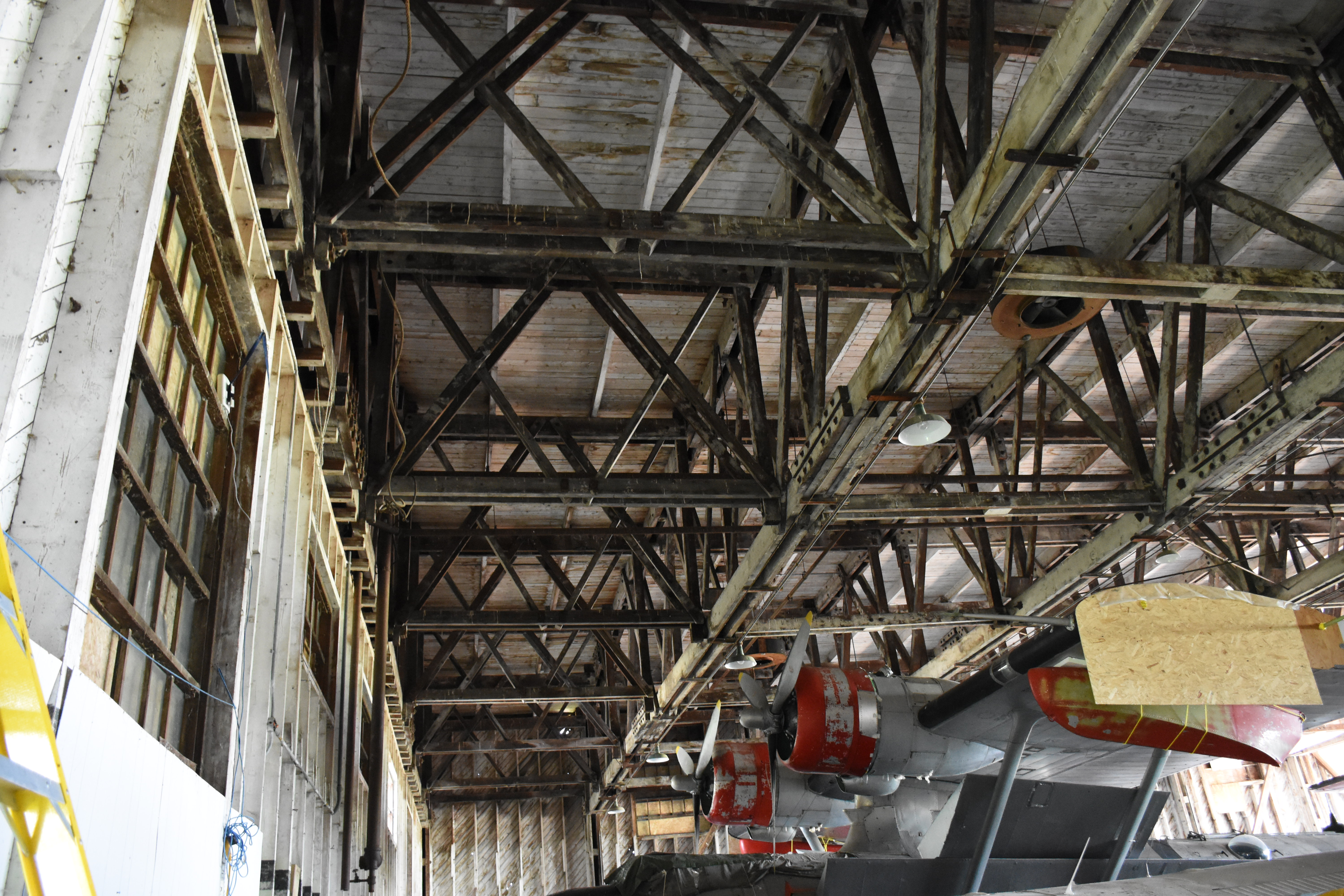
Ceiling trusses

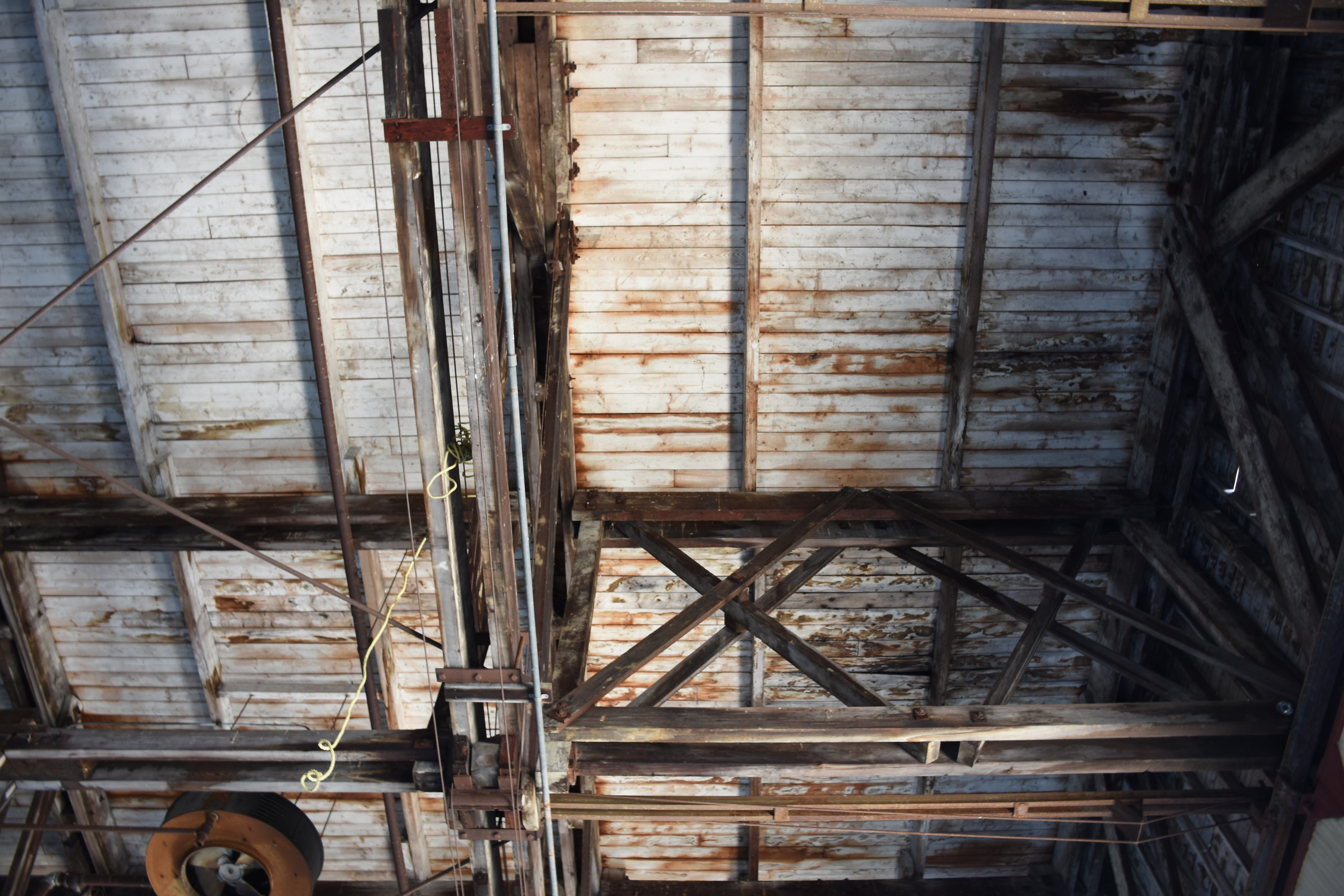
Ceiling detail

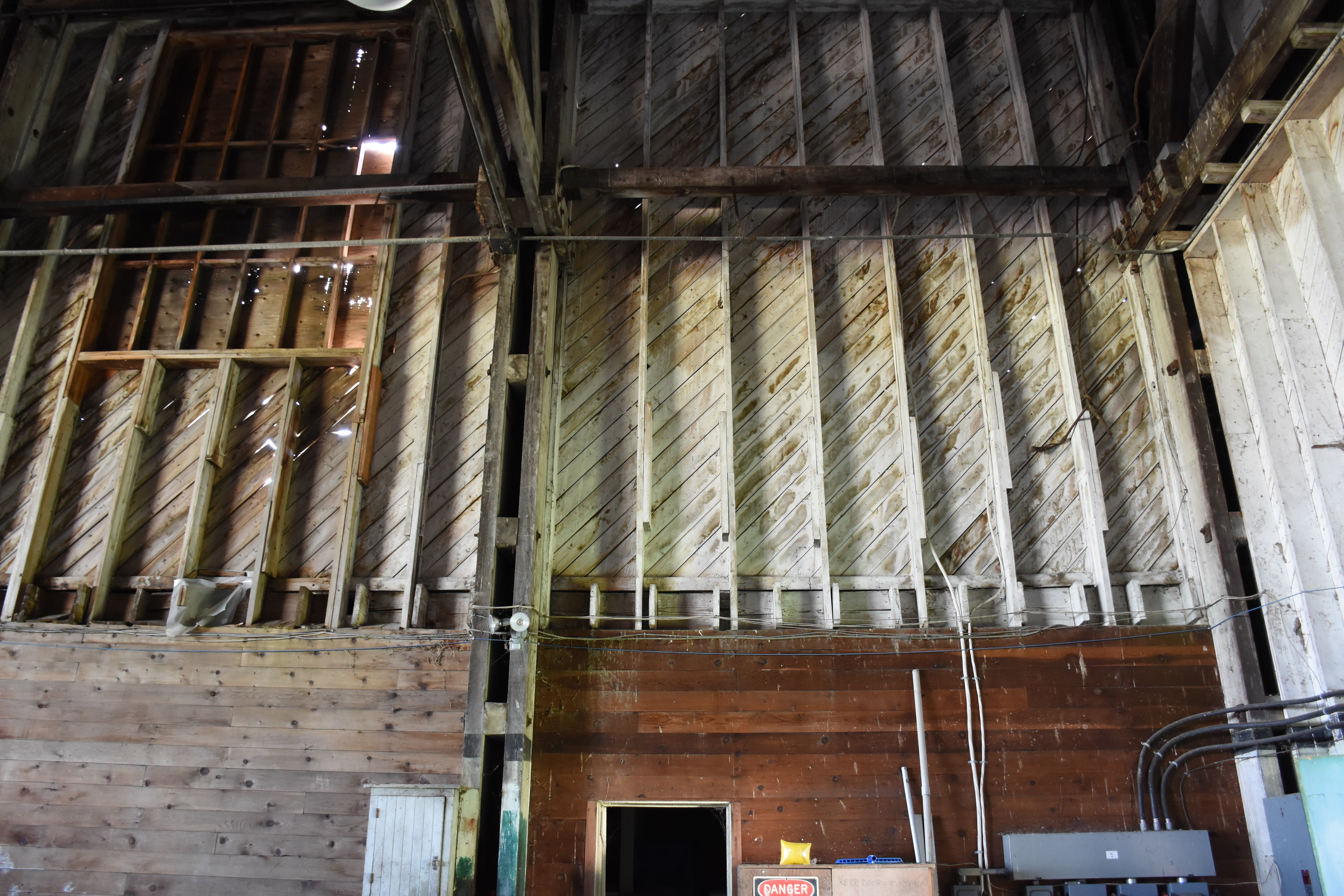
Wall detail
