= List of ships named Kingston =

Several ships have been named Kingston:

- Kingston (1780 ship) was launched at Bristol. Between 1798 and 1817 she made ten voyages as a whaler. She was last listed in 1819.
- Kingston (1806 Whitby ship) was launched in 1806 at Whitby and spent her career trading primarily between England and the West Indies, though also trading with Sicily, America, and India, and possibly Russia. Her crew abandoned her at sea in 1819 when she developed a leak.
- Kingston (1806 Liverpool ship) was launched in 1806 at Liverpool. She made one voyage as a slave ship and then traded with the West Indies until she was lost in 1809.
- Kingston (1811 ship) was launched in 1811 at Bristol. She spent the first part of her career trading with the West Indies, but then made two voyages for the British East India Company. Thereafter she traded between England and India and England and Quebec until she was lost in 1833.
- PS Kingston was an English paddle steamer completed in 1821.

== See also ==
- HMS Kingston – one of five ships of the Royal Navy
- HMCS Kingston (MM 700), a Kingston-class coastal defence vessel in the Canadian Forces since 1996
- Kingston (disambiguation)
