= KBC =

KBC may refer to:

== Broadcasting ==
- KBC (TV channel), Algeria
- Kenya Broadcasting Corporation
- Kwangju Broadcasting Corporation, South Korea
- Kyushu Asahi Broadcasting, a Japanese station referred to as KBC

== Companies ==
- KBC Bank, Belgian bank and insurance company
- Kerrville Bus Company, a subsidiary of Coach USA

== Colleges ==
- Kachemak Bay Campus, a campus of Kenai Peninsula College, a unit of the University of Alaska Anchorage
- Kingsbrook College, one of the two schools that merged to become Elizabeth Woodville School
- Kingston Bible College, Kingston, Nova Scotia, Canada

== Other ==
- Birch Creek Airport (IATA code KBC), airport in Birch Creek, Alaska
- KBC Band, formed in 1986 by former members of the band Jefferson Airplane
- The KBC, an indie and disco house band from Preston, Lancashire
- Kaun Banega Crorepati, Indian game show based on Who Wants to Be a Millionaire?
- Karachi Boat Club, Karachi, Sindh, Pakistan
- Kinbrace railway station, National Rail code KBC
- Kuki Baptist Convention in northeast India
- KBC Void, an astronomical phenomenon
- KeyBank Center, a multi-purpose arena in Buffalo, New York
