= HMS Kingston =

Five ships of the Royal Navy have borne the name HMS Kingston.

- HMS Kingston (1697) was a 60-gun fourth rate, launched in 1697, rebuilt in 1719 and 1740 and sold in 1762. Destroyed in 1763 whilst serving as the privateer Lord Clive.
- HMS Kingston was previously HMS Prince Regent, a 56-gun fourth rate launched in 1814. She was renamed HMS Kingston later in 1814 and was sold in 1832.
- HMS Kingston was the name proposed in 1817 for a 52-gun fourth rate eventually launched in 1822 as HMS Portland.
- HMS Kingston (1858) was a schooner, formerly the slaver Caries. She was captured in 1858 by HMS Forward and sunk as a bathing place in 1861.
- HMS Kingston (F64) was a K-class destroyer launched in 1939 and wrecked in an air attack in 1942. The hull was subsequently used as a blockship.

== See also ==
- HMCS Kingston (MM 700), a Kingston-class coastal defence vessel launched in 1995 and currently in service with the Royal Canadian Navy.
- PS Kingston, a paddle steamer completed in 1821 in England
- List of ships named Kingston
- Kingston (disambiguation)
