= Kingston, Fresno County, California =

Coordinates: 36°25′24.71″N 119°41′37.9″W

Kingston is a former settlement, formerly in Fresno County, California. It was located 3.5 miles (5.6 km) west of Laton. Kingston, California is now in Kings County, California. Originally in Fresno County, until 1909 when Fresno County lands in the vicinity, south of the Kings River were transferred to Kings County.

A post office operated at Kingston from 1859 to 1862, and from 1866 to 1890, when the service transferred to Lillis.
