= Kingston Township =

Kingston Township may refer to:

== Canada ==
- Kingston Township, Ontario, now part of the city of Kingston, Ontario

== United States ==
- Kingston Township, DeKalb County, Illinois
- Kingston Township, Michigan
- Kingston Township, Meeker County, Minnesota
- Kingston Township, Caldwell County, Missouri
- Kingston Township, Washington County, Missouri
- Kingston Township, Sargent County, North Dakota, in Sargent County, North Dakota
- Kingston Township, Delaware County, Ohio
- Kingston Township, Luzerne County, Pennsylvania
