= Kingston House =

Kingston House may refer to:

- Kingston House estate, London, Knightsbridge, London, England
- Kingston House, Kingston upon Hull, East Riding of Yorkshire, England
- Kingston House, Kingston Park, South Australia, Australia
- Kingston House (Pennsylvania), a historic inn and tavern Unity Township, Westmoreland County, Pennsylvania, U.S.
- Kingston House, Shrewsbury, Shropshire, England
- The Hall, Bradford-on-Avon, Wiltshire, England
- Kingston, Staverton, Devon, England

== See also ==
- Kingston Maurward House, Dorset, England
- Kingston (Upper Marlboro, Maryland), U.S., a historic home
- Zachry-Kingston House, in Morgan County, Georgia, U.S.
