= Kingston Hill =

Kingston Hill may refer to:

- Kingston Hill, London, a district in southwest London, England
- SS Kingston Hill, a British cargo ship built in 1940 and torpedoed and sunk in 1941
- Kingston Hill (horse), a British Thoroughbred racehorse
