= Warren Kinston =

Australian scientist, doctor and entrepreneur (born 1945)

Warren Kinston (born 16 May 1945) is an Australian scientist, psychiatrist, psychoanalyst, systems thinker and entrepreneur.

== Ethical design ==
Kinston has made contributions to various fields, including ethical design, systems thinking, and taxonomy development. His work as a consultant led him to pioneer the concept of ethical design, emphasizing the importance of integrating values into all aspects of decision-making and relationships to address social and psychological issues.

== Taxonomy of human elements in endeavour ==
During his career, Kinston developed a set of tools known as the Technology of Common Sense, aimed at assisting managers in their decision-making process. He expanded his systems thinking approach to encompass personal and social aspects of life, leading to the creation of the Taxonomy of Human Elements in Endeavour (THEE). THEE provides a comprehensive framework for understanding topics such as purpose, value, politics, decision-making, and achievement in various contexts, including management and employment.

The taxonomy architecture of THEE is based on the identification and analysis of universal elements of human activity, their functions, properties, relationships, and dynamics. This approach allows for the periodic table of chemical elements, similar to the discovery of the periodic table of chemical elements. While parts of the Taxonomy are still under development, Kinston proposed an evolutionary basis for the discovered architecture in 2012–2014.

In 2007, Kinston introduced THEE at the Global Organization Design Conference in Toronto, Canada. He subsequently launched the THEE Online Project in 2008, making emerging frameworks accessible through an interactive website that went public in February 2011.

== Early life, education and career ==
Kinston's educational background includes science and medical degrees from the University of Sydney, where he also conducted research in neurophysiology. He furthered his studies in psychiatry at the Maudsley Hospital in London and obtained post-graduate qualifications in psychiatry and psychoanalysis from the University of London and the London Institute of Psychoanalysis, respectively.

Throughout his career, Kinston has been involved in groundbreaking work, particularly in the field of child psychiatry at Great Ormond Street Hospital in London, where he played a significant role in introducing family therapy and systems practice to the UK. His contributions to psychoanalysis include advancements in understanding narcissism and repression from a practical and clinical perspective.

In 1980, Kinston joined Brunel University's Institute of Organisation and Social Studies (BIOSS), where he worked closely with Prof. Elliott Jaques on the development of levels of work theory. At Brunel, Kinston founded The SIGMA Centre, a research-based consulting firm that worked with various public and private organizations, including the National Health Service (NHS).

Kinston's entrepreneurial ventures include co-founding biotech companies Bionomics Ltd and Cryptome Research Pty Ltd, which were listed on the Australian Securities Exchange (ASX).

== Publications ==
Many publications are in the fields of psychoanalysis and family therapy. Publications related to the development of THEE include:

- Pluralism in the organisation of health services research. Social Science and Medicine, 17 (5): 299–313. 1982
- District Health Organisation. Social Policy and Administration, 18 (3): 229–246. 1984
- Purposes and the translation of values into action. Systems Research, 3 (3): 147–160. 1986
- Stronger Nursing Organisation (London: Brunel University College, 1987) ISBN 0902215779
- A Total Framework for Inquiry. Systems Research, 4 (1): 9–26. 1988
- A Local Revolution. The House Magazine p. 6, 20 June 1988. (with David Wilshire)
- Rescuing Local Government. County Council Gazette, 81 (2): 50–52. 1988
- Stronger Political Management in Local Government: A Guide. (London: Brunel University – Political Management Program, 1988) ISBN 0902215841
- Levels of Work: New applications to management in large organisations. Journal of Applied Systems Analysis, 16:19–33. 1989 (with Ralph Rowbottom)
- Seven distinctive paths of decision and action. Systems Research, 6 (1): 117–132. 1989 (with Jimmy Algie)
- Making General Management Work in the National Health Service (London: Brunel University, 1989) with Ralph Rowbottom ISBN 0902215914
- The role of region in the post-White Paper NHS. Health Services Management, 85 (3): 110–113. 1989
- Strengthening the Management Culture (London: The Sigma Centre, 1994) ISBN 1874726019
- Working with Values: Software of the Mind (London: The Sigma Centre, 1995) ISBN 1874726027
