= Kington (surname) =

Kington is a surname. Notable people with the surname include:

- L. Brent Kington, American artist and metalsmith
- Miles Kington, British journalist and musician
- Philip Kington (1832–1892), English businessman, landowner and cricketer
- Raynard S. Kington, deputy director of the U.S. National Institutes of Health, and will become the president of Grinnell College
- Thomas Kington (1794–1874), English clergyman
- William Kington (1838–1898), British soldier and cricketer

== In fiction ==
- Jonathan Kington, CIA codemaster in the TV series Decker
