= Kingston v Preston =

- Court: Court of King's Bench
- Citation: (1773) 2 Doug KB 689

Court membership
- Judge sitting: Lord Mansfield

Keywords
- Withholding performance

Kingston v Preston (1773) 2 Doug KB 689 is an English contract law case, concerning the right to withhold performance for a contract.

== Facts ==
Kingston, a silk-mercer, sued Preston, a business owner for failing to convey the business to Kingston and his nephew after Kingston served for a year and a quarter. They had agreed Preston would convey the stock in trade over a period of time, in return for Kingston providing security. But Kingston never provided the security. Kingston sued.

== Judgment ==
Lord Mansfield held that because the security was a condition precedent to Preston’s performance, Preston had been entitled to withhold conveyance. Lord Mansfield gave a judgment which was recorded as follows:

In delivering the judgment of the Court, Lord Mansfield expressed himself to the following effect: There are three kinds of covenants:

1. Such as are called mutual and independent, where either party may recover damages from the other, for the injury he may have received by a breach of the covenants in his favour, and where it is no excuse for the defendant, to allege a breach of the covenants on the part of the plaintiff.

2. There are covenants which are conditions and dependent, in which the performance of one depends on the prior performance of another, and, therefore, till this prior condition is performed, the other party is not liable to an action on his covenant.

3. There is also a third sort of covenants, which are mutual conditions to be performed at the same time; and, in these, if one party was ready, and offered, to perform his part, and the other neglected, or refused, to perform his, he who was ready, and offered, has fulfilled his engagement, and may maintain an action for the default of the other; though it is not certain that either is obliged to do the first act.

His Lordship then proceeded to say, that the dependence, or independence, of covenants, was to be collected from the evident sense and meaning of the parties, and, that, however transposed they might be in the deed, their precedency must depend on the order of time in which the intent of the transaction requires their performance. That, in the case before the Court, it would be the greatest injustice if the plaintiff should prevail: the essence of the agreement was, that the defendant should not trust to the personal security of the plaintiff, but, before he delivered up his stock and business, should have good security for the payment of the money. The giving such security, therefore, must necessarily be a condition precedent.—Judgment was accordingly given for the defendant, because the part to be performed by the plaintiff was clearly a condition precedent.

== See also ==
- United Kingdom enterprise law
