= Kingtown, Arkansas =

- Unincorporated community
- Location within Arkansas Location within the United States
- Coordinates: 34°29′48″N 90°53′29″W
- Country: United States
- State: Arkansas
- County: Arkansas
- Township: Big Creek
- Elevation: 180 ft (55 m)
- Time zone: UTC-6 (Central (CST))
  - Summer (DST): UTC-5 (CDT)
- Area code: 870
- GNIS feature ID: 58022

Kingtown is an unincorporated community in Phillips County, Arkansas, United States.
