= James Kingstone =

English cricketer

James Kingstone (born 10 February 1982) was an English cricketer. He played for Berkshire, where he was a right-handed batsman and wicket-keeper. He was born in Reading.

Kingstone, who made his debut for Berkshire in April 2004, made his only List A appearance a month later, against Kent. From the lower order, he scored 17 not out.
