= Kingstown (disambiguation) =

Kingstown is the capital city of Saint Vincent and the Grenadines.

Kingstown may also refer to:

== Places ==
=== Australia ===
- Kingstown, New South Wales

=== Ireland ===
- Dún Laoghaire, Ireland, named Kingstown from 1821 until 1921

=== United Kingdom ===
- Kingstown, a townland in County Fermanagh, Northern Ireland
- A northern suburb of Carlisle, England

=== United States ===
- Kingstown, Maryland
- Kingstown, North Carolina
- North Kingstown, Rhode Island
- South Kingstown, Rhode Island

== Organisations ==
- Kingstown Radio, a radio station in Kingston upon Hull, England

== See also ==
- King's Town
- Kington (disambiguation)
- Kingston (disambiguation)
- Kingstone (disambiguation)
