= Kingston Nyamapfene =

Zimbabwean academic

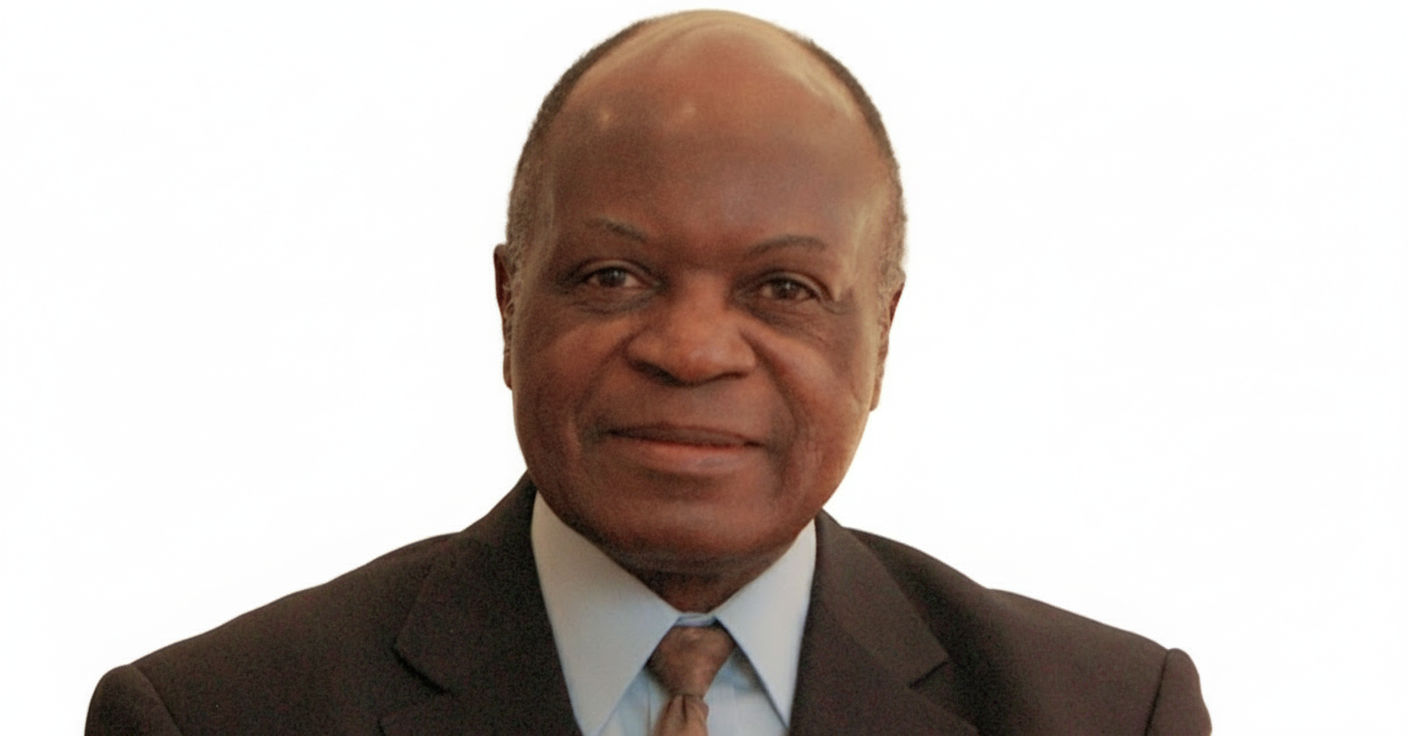
- Professor Kingston Nyamapfene
- Born: Zimbabwe
- Known for: Higher education leadership, agronomy, environmental management, international education

Academic background
- Education: University of London; Cornell University; University of Aberdeen; ITC, Netherlands

Academic work
- Discipline: Agronomy; environmental management; higher education
- Institutions: Texas Southern University; SUNY Empire State College; Rocky Mountain College; Fort Hare University; Vista University; iThinQ.com; Stellenbosch University; University of Johannesburg; African University of Science and Technology; University of Africa, Toru-Orua; International University of Grand-Bassam

Kingston Nyamapfene is an American scholar and higher education administrator with a distinguished career spanning multiple continents. He has held significant academic and leadership positions first in Zimbabwe, and later mostly in South Africa, West Africa, Europe, and the United States, contributing extensively to the fields of agronomy, environmental management, and higher education.

== Early life and education ==
Nyamapfene obtained a Bachelor of Arts degree from the University of London, majoring in English and Geography; a Master of Science in Agronomy from Cornell University; and a Ph.D. in Soil Science from the University of Aberdeen, Scotland. He also holds a diploma in Remote Sensing from the International Institute for Aerospace Survey and Earth Science in the Netherlands.

== Career ==
=== United States ===
- Assistant provost for E-Learning and dean of the College of Continuing Education, Texas Southern University, Houston, Texas
- Dean of International Programs, State University of New York's Empire State College
- Holder of the endowed Mildred and Homer Scott Distinguished Leadership Chair, Rocky Mountain College, Montana

=== Contributions in Zimbabwe and the SADC region ===
- Research Scientist at the Chemistry and Soil Research Institute, Zimbabwe
- Chair of the Department of Land Management, University of Zimbabwe
- Led the establishment of the first Department of Soil Science in the Faculty of Agriculture
- Author of The Soils of Zimbabwe
- Head of Agronomy and later dean of the Faculty of Agriculture, Fort Hare University
- Deputy vice-chancellor (Academic and Research), Vista University (multi-campus system with 37,000 students across South Africa and Namibia)
- Managing director, iThinQ.com, a private sector online learning initiative linked to SAP

=== West Africa ===
- Vice president for Academic Affairs, International University of Grand-Bassam, Cote d'Ivoire
- President, African University of Science and Technology (AUST), Abuja
- Vice-chancellor, University of Africa, Toru-Orua (UAT), Bayelsa State

== Research and publications ==
Nyamapfene's research interests encompass soil science, agronomy, and environmental management, particularly in the remediation and rehabilitation of lands affected by mining activities. He has published extensively, with over 70 papers in peer-reviewed journals and authoring or co-authoring 15 books and monographs, including a textbook on globalization.
