= Kingston (biscuit) =

Australian sweet biscuit

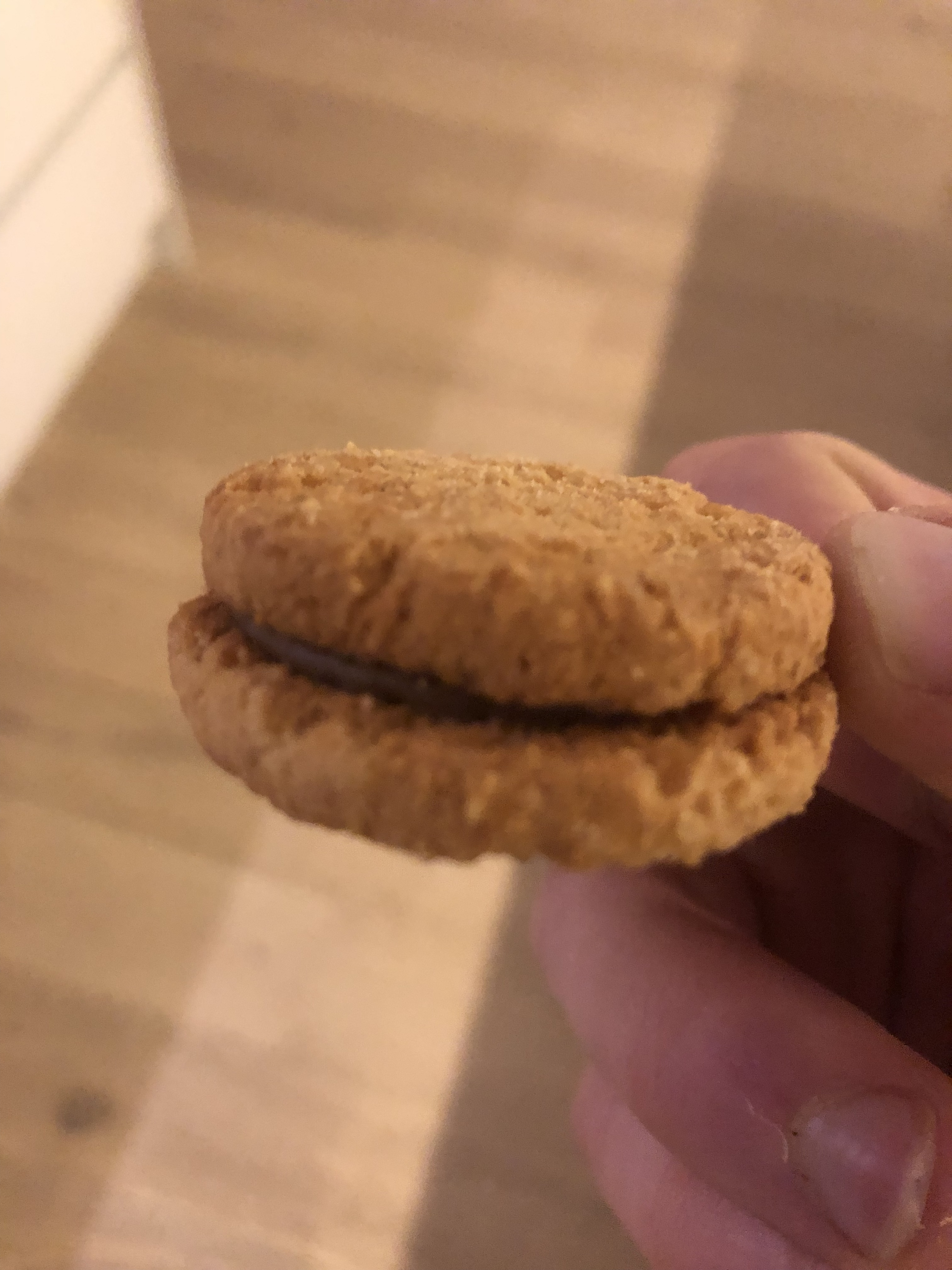
- A Kingston biscuit
- Type: Biscuit
- Course: Snack / afternoon tea
- Place of origin: Australia

The Kingston is an Australian sweet biscuit that has been manufactured since 1926 by the American-owned Australian-based biscuit company, Arnott's Biscuits Holdings.

The Kingston biscuit consists of two individual rounded desiccated coconut biscuits with a chocolate cream filling. The Kingston biscuit falls under the 'Delicious Creams' family of Arnott's sweet biscuits. The Kingston is widely available in Australia, sold in most supermarkets in 200 g (7.1 oz) packages of twelve individual biscuits, or as one of the five biscuits in the Arnott's Assorted Creams 500 g (18 oz) variety pack. It is commonly believed to be named after a city located near Hobart.

The Kingston was ranked as No. 2 on Good Food's 2019 list ranking in the Arnott's Family Assorted biscuits.
