= West Kingston =

West Kingston may refer to:

- West Kingston, England, hamlet in West Sussex
- West Kingston, Rhode Island, in the United States
- West Kingston, Jamaica, section of Kingston, Jamaica
