= Kingston High School =

Kingston High School may refer to:

== Australia ==
- Kingston High School (Tasmania), Kingston, Tasmania

== United Kingdom ==
- Kingston High School, Hull, East Riding of Yorkshire

== United States ==
- Kingston High School (Arkansas), Kingston, Arkansas
- Kingston High School (New York), Kingston, New York
- Kingston High School (Washington), Kingston, Washington

== See also ==
- Genoa-Kingston High School, Genoa, Illinois, United States
- Kingston Grammar School, a private co-educational day school in Kingston upon Thames, London
