= Kingstone Companies =

Kingstone Companies, Inc.
- Company type: Public
- Traded as: Nasdaq: KINS; Russell 2000 Index component
- Industry: Property & Casualty Insurance
- Founded: 1886; 140 years ago
- Headquarters: Hewlett, New York, United States
- Key people: Barry Goldstein (CEO)
- Number of employees: 101
- Website: kingstonecompanies.com

Kingstone Companies, Inc., headquartered in Kingston, New York, provides property and casualty insurance products through its subsidiary, Kingstone Insurance Company. It places contracts with the third-party licensed premium finance company through its subsidiary Payments, Inc., a NYS licensed Insurance Premium Finance Company. Kingstone Insurance Company was ranked #1 of the 81 insurers rated by the Professional Insurance Agents Association in its 2010 Company Performance Survey. The company sells insurance products include personal lines of insurance products, general liability policies commercial automobile policies and so on through independent retail and wholesale agents and brokers.

== History ==
In 1886, the company was founded in Kingston, New York.

== Operation ==
In December 2013, the company announced that it has commenced an underwritten public offering of 2,500,000 shares of its common stock to promote the insurance subsidiary, Kingstone Insurance Company.

In October 2020, Kingstone Companies, Inc. has reported its pre-tax disaster damages of net reinsurance between $8.5 million and $9 million for the third quarter of 2020.

== Woolgar v. Kingstone Companies et al. ==
On 11 August 2020, Kingstone Companies, Inc. has confirmed that the U.S. District Court for the Southern District of New York today denied the defendant's request to withdraw the amended lawsuit in the putative shareholder class action litigation initially brought in 2019 against the corporation and several existing and former officers and directors.
