= Kingston Airfield =

Former airfield in Kingston, Ontario

- The airfield in 1940
- IATA: none; ICAO: none

Summary
- Airport type: Redeveloped as subdivision
- Owner: City of Kingston
- Operator: Kingston Flying Club>
- Location: Kingston, Ontario
- Opened: 1929
- Closed: 1942
- Time zone: EST (UTC−05:00)
  - Summer (DST): EDT (UTC−04:00)
- Coordinates: 44°15′04″N 076°30′10″W

Map
- Location in Ontario

Runways
| Direction | Length | | Surface |
| Direction | ft | m | Surface |
|---|---|---|---|
| | 1,200 | 365 | grass |

Kingston Airfield, in Kingston, Ontario, Canada, operated from 1929–1942 as Kingston's first airport. It consisted of a grass strip and supporting buildings in what is now the Kingscourt subdivision of the city, just to the west of the St. Mary's cemetery. The city of Kingston purchased what was then the Reid Farm and leased it to the Kingston Flying Club, who operated a flight school using two Gipsy Moth aircraft.

The Kingston Airfield was a popular refuelling stop between Toronto and Montreal, and in 1931, 1,400 transient aircraft were recorded using the field.

The airport was closed in 1942 after a crash. After World War II, the Kingston Flying Club resumed operations at Norman Rogers Airport, west of the city, which had been built as a military field, and the original Kingston Airfield was redeveloped as a residential neighbourhood.

== Sources ==
- Kingston's First Airfield (Kingston Whig-Standard, 4 June 2009) Retrieved September 12, 2011
