= Kington =

Kington may refer to:

== Places ==
=== England ===
- Kington, Herefordshire
- Kington, historical name of Kineton, Warwickshire
  - Kington Hundred
- Kington, Worcestershire
- Kington Magna, Dorset
- Kington Langley, Wiltshire
- Kington St Michael, Wiltshire
- West Kington, Wiltshire

== People ==
- Kington (surname)

== See also ==
- Kingston (disambiguation)
- Kinston (disambiguation)
