= Kingston Norman Rogers Airport =

Airport in Kingston, Ontario

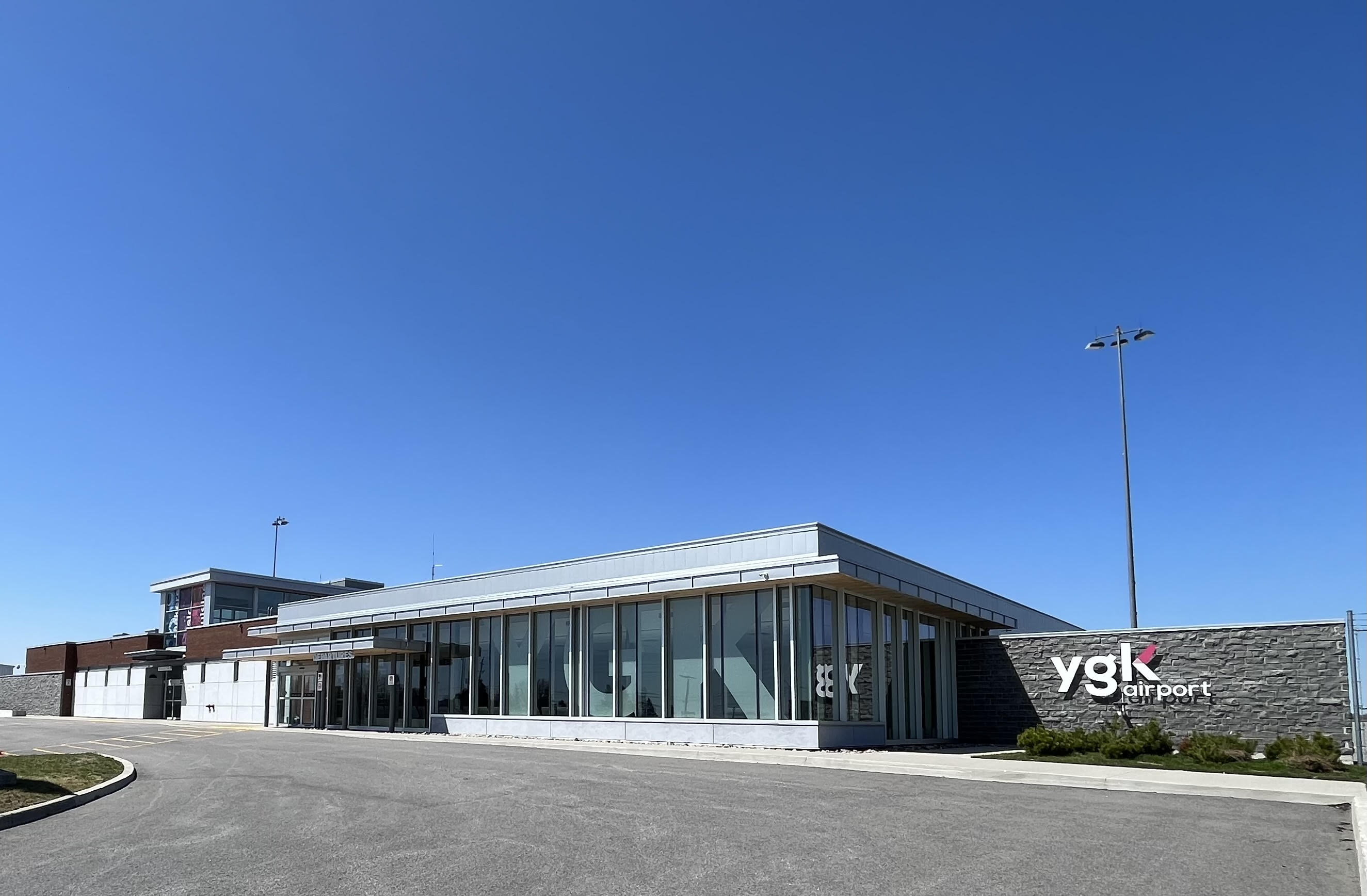
- Norman Rogers Airport Terminal in 2023
- IATA: YGK; ICAO: CYGK; WMO: 71620

Summary
- Airport type: Public
- Operator: City of Kingston
- Opened: December 1940; 85 years ago
- Time zone: EST (UTC−05:00)
  - Summer (DST): EDT (UTC−04:00)
- Elevation AMSL: 303 ft (92 m)
- Coordinates: 44°13′35″N 076°35′48″W
- Website: www.ygkairport.ca

Map
- Location in Ontario CYGK (Canada)

Runways
Direction	Length		Surface
Direction	ft	m	Surface
01/19	6,001	1,829	Asphalt
07/25	3,909	1,191	Asphalt

Statistics (2010)
- Aircraft movements: 37,876
- Source: Canada Flight Supplement; Environment Canada; Movements from Statistics Canada

Kingston Norman Rogers Airport or YGK Airport (IATA: YGK, ICAO: CYGK), also known as Kingston Airport, is the main airport serving Kingston, Ontario and its metropolitan area. The airport is named after Norman McLeod Rogers (former member of parliament for Kingston City 1935–1940), Minister of Labour and then National Defence in prime minister William Lyon Mackenzie King's cabinet. Located 4.3 nautical miles (8.0 km; 4.9 mi) west of downtown Kingston, Ontario, in the west end of the city, it is the largest airport in the region, in 2019 it was reported that 70,000 people travel through the airport each year. It is classified as an airport of entry by Nav Canada and staffed by the Canada Border Services Agency who can handle aircraft with up to 30 passengers. (Note: This number refers to the processing capacity of the Canada Border Services Agency. Where no number is given it indicates that the airport is able to handle an aircraft of any size. The numbers in parentheses indicate the number of passengers that may be handled if the aircraft is able to unload in stages. An airport with the number 15 indicates that only general aviation aircraft with 15 or fewer passengers may be handled.)

The airport was formerly a wartime military air station built and owned by Royal Canadian Air Force (RCAF) for use as a Royal Air Force training school. The Department of Transport assumed ownership of the site after the end of the Second World War and leased the airport to the City of Kingston. The airport faced challenges in maintaining profitability until the City of Kingston purchased it completely in 1974.

== History ==
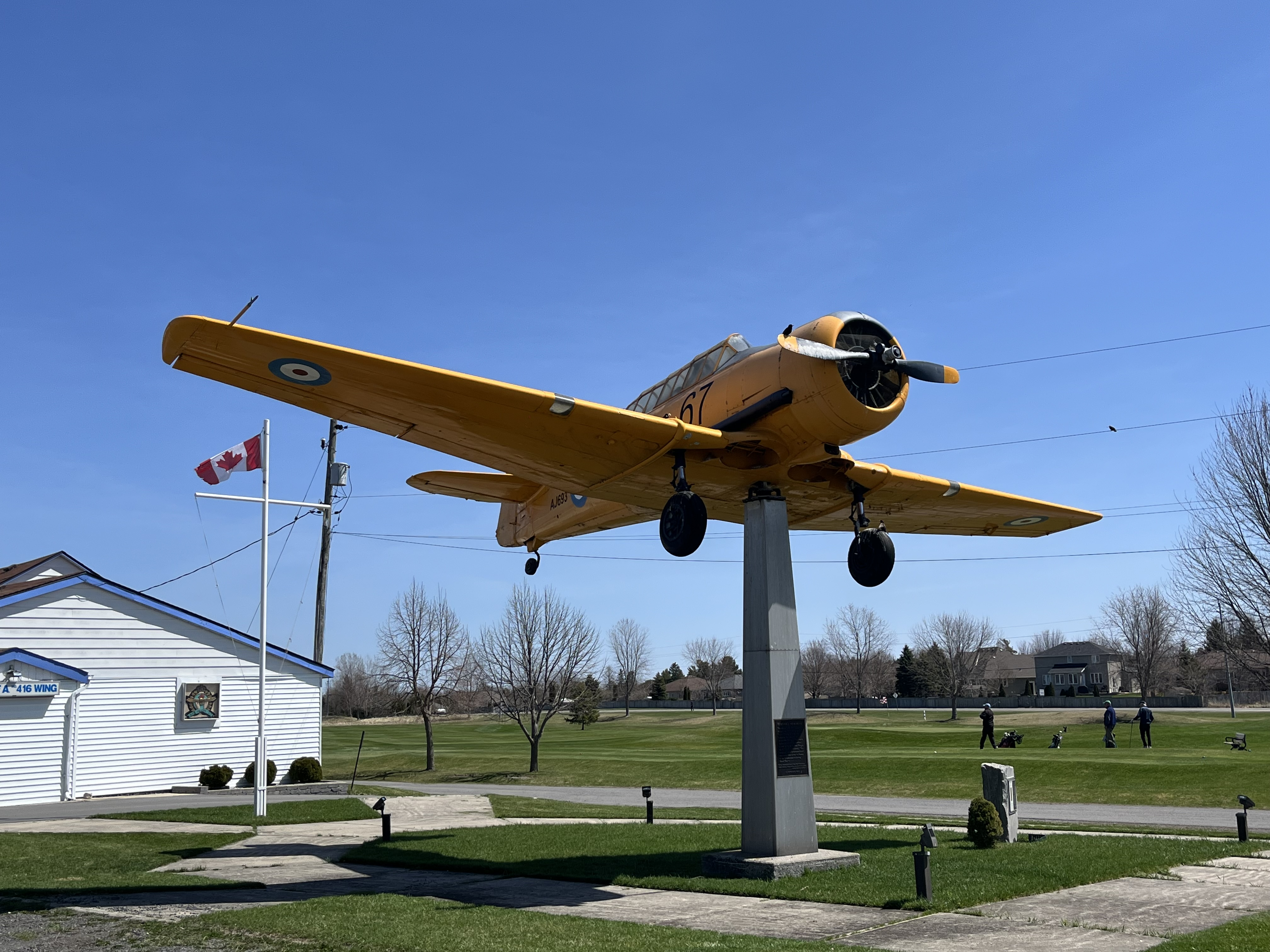
Kingston Airport Harvard BC-1 Memorial

Before 1940, Kingston was served only by the Kingston Airfield, a grass strip just north of the city's downtown, which closed in 1942. In 1940, during the Second World War, an airfield was built to the west of Kingston to serve as a training station for the Royal Air Force's No. 31 Service Flying Training School (SFTS). The school provided advanced flight training in Battle and Harvard aircraft. In 1942 the school became part of the British Commonwealth Air Training Plan (BCATP). The BCATP's No. 14 Service Flying Training School moved to Kingston in 1944 and merged with the RAF school. No. 14 SFTS used Harvards, Yales and Ansons. The airport's runway outline displays the classic BCATP triangle pattern. A decommissioned yellow Harvard aircraft now stands on a pedestal near the airport entrance to commemorate the airport's wartime role. The airport is home to Royal Canadian Air Force Association 416 Wing Kingston.

In 1953, naval air squadron VC 921 was formed as a tender to HMCS Cataraqui, and used the airport. The unit operated Harvards and one C-45D Expeditor until it was disbanded in 1959.

The airport was transferred to city control in 1972.

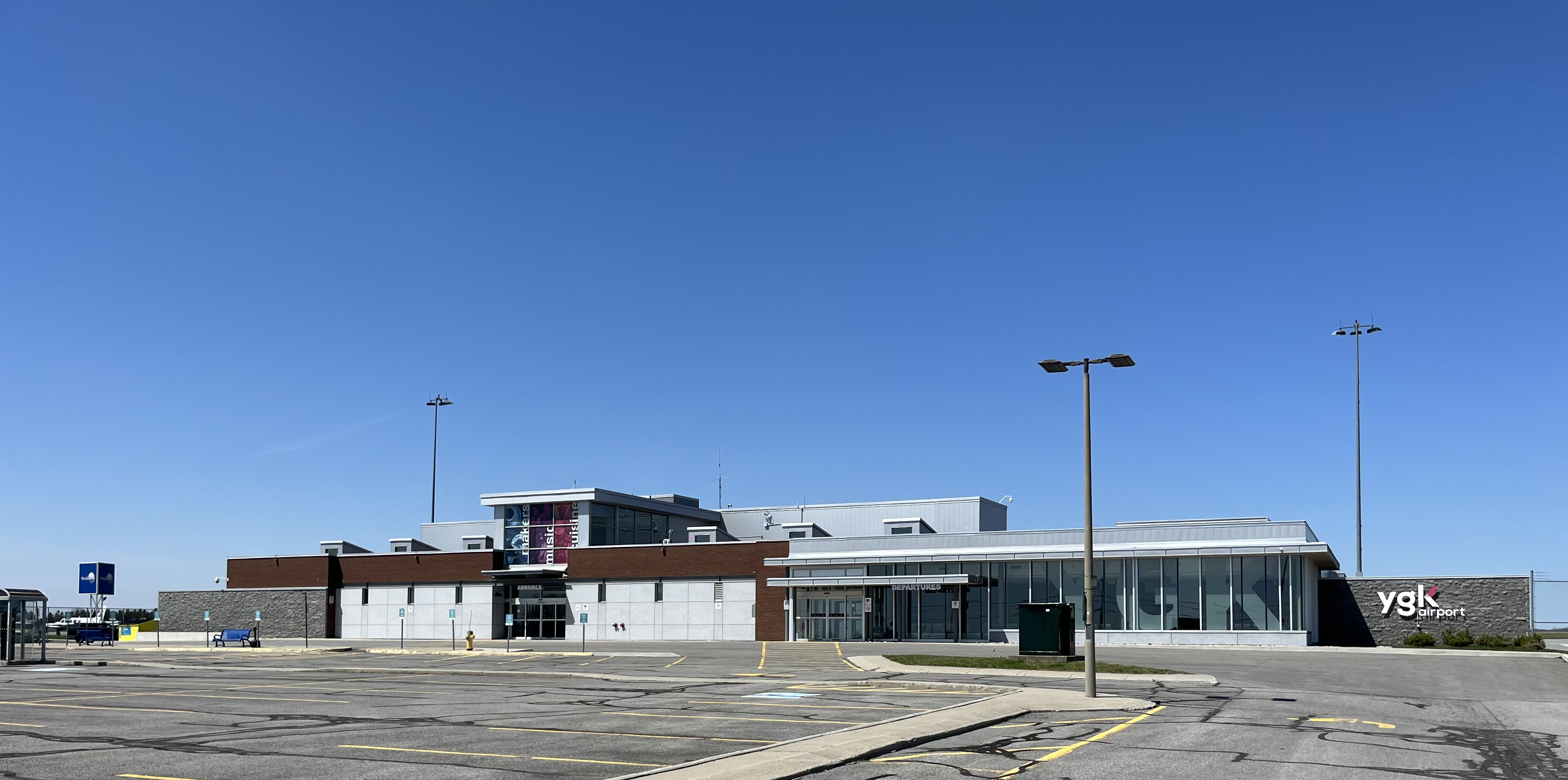
Norman Rogers Airport Terminal in 2023

The airport was originally built with six 2,500 ft (760 m) runways; however, this was reduced to three, as they were all parallel runways. One can still see where some parts of the parallel runways were from the air. Later, runway 01/19 was extended northwards to a length of 5,000 ft (1,500 m) to handle larger aircraft, and it was later extended to 6,000 ft (1,800 m) (the prevailing wind is from the south off Lake Ontario). Runway 07/25 was extended northeastwards to a length of nearly 4,000 ft (1,200 m), with no plans to extend it, due to the requirements for certified airports on runways over a certain length. The remaining runway, 12/30, was decommissioned in 2003 and converted to a taxiway.

Kingston Airport became a part of the Southern Ontario Airport Network (SOAN), a newly formed airport alliance, in 2017. This network comprises 12 commercial airports in Southern Ontario.

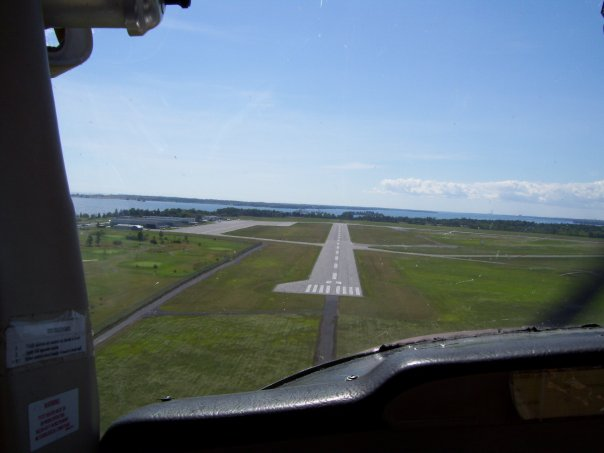
On approach to runway 25 in a Cessna C-150

In 2018, the city extended runway 01/19 from 5,000 ft (1,500 m) to 6,001 ft (1,829 m). At the same time, the terminal was under construction with plans to expand the post security waiting area to accommodate larger aircraft such as a Boeing 737 or De Havilland Canada Dash 8 (Q400). Construction is also underway at the departure and arrival areas to accommodate more passengers as well as a general renovation to make it more inviting and accessible.

Air Canada indefinitely suspended its operations at Kingston Airport in June 2020 because of the financial impact of the COVID-19 pandemic in Canada.

On August 31, 2020, FlyGTA Airlines announced that it would begin regular passenger service four days per week between Kingston and Billy Bishop Toronto City Airport on September 10. However, due to COVID, the airline stopped running this service on December 10, 2020.

On December 9, 2021, Pascan Aviation announced that it would begin regular passenger service between Kingston and Montréal–Trudeau International Airport starting March 14, 2022.

On January 11, 2022, the City of Kingston announced that once again, it has partnered with FlyGTA Airlines to offer passenger service between Kingston and Toronto starting January 31, 2022.

On August 30, 2022, at Norman Rogers Airport a press conference was hosted by Mark Gerretsen, the MP for Kingston and the Islands, concerning federal funding totaling $2.8 million through the Regional Air Transportation Initiative (RATI). This funding will be distributed among four airports in southern Ontario, including Kingston Airport, Cornwall Regional Airport, Huronia Airport, and Arnprior Airport.

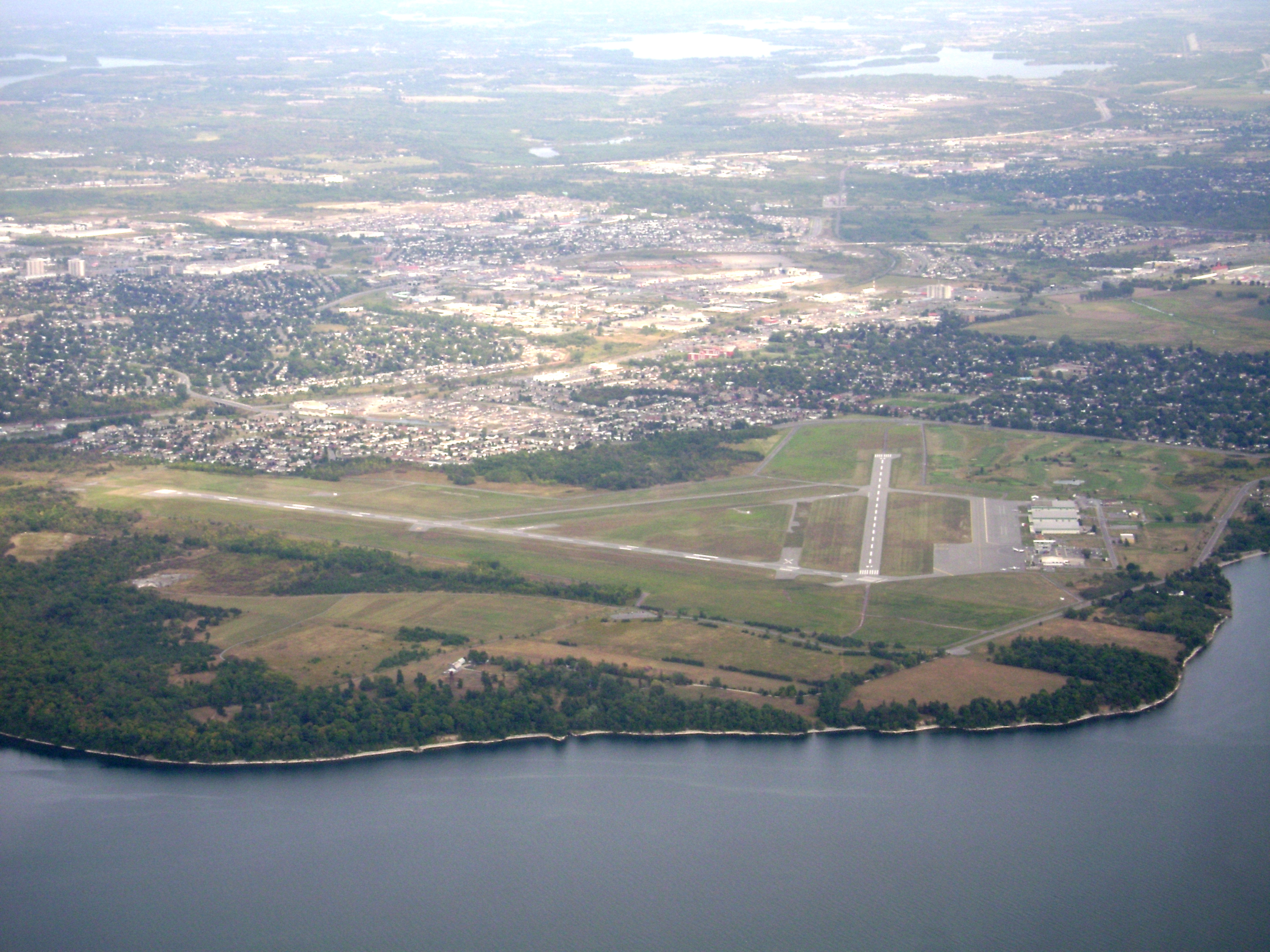
Kingston Airport Pre 2018 Expansion

The City of Kingston, which manages Kingston Airport, will obtain a $1.3 million non-repayable investment aimed at enhancing safety protocols and formulating strategic plans to adapt the airport to the post-pandemic landscape. This financial support is expected to facilitate the return of over 18,000 passengers traveling between Kingston and Toronto through Kingston Airport.

On December 1, 2022, the City of Kingston announced that Pascan Aviation will be pausing their air service at YGK Airport as of January 6, 2023. The pause in service means that Kingston will be losing its only regular passenger airline service, at least temporarily.

In March 2023, Aron Winterstein, the manager of Kingston Airport, revealed that they are actively engaging in conversations with multiple airlines, with the aim of restoring passenger services at the airport. Furthermore, Winterstein suggested that international flights could be a possibility in the future. Apart from commercial flights, the airport now accommodates a range of regular operations. Winterstein stated that the airport currently handles approximately 80% of the flights it did prior to the pandemic. These operations include daily medical transfer flights from the Moosonee and James Bay areas to Kingston Health Sciences Centre hospitals, daily cargo flights, military operations, and private corporate flights. Despite this, the unavailability of some services has left a noticeable effect. The general public has expressed concern regarding the absence of open communication and a well-defined strategy for reinstating air services.

== Ground Transportation ==
=== Airline coaches ===
Operator	Destinations
Air Canada (operated by Landline)	Toronto–Pearson

Air Canada operates "land-air" motorcoach connection services between Kingston Norman Rogers Airport and Toronto Pearson International Airport, as they are deemed too close geographically for regularly scheduled flights to currently be operated economically. The service provides ticketed Air Canada and Star Alliance passengers with multiple daily non-stop ground connections between Kingston Airport and Terminal 1 at Toronto Pearson.

== Frequencies ==
Kingston Airport services two frequencies: ATIS (135.550 MHz) and radio (122.500 MHz). There is also guidance for private aircraft needing fuel or parking on Kingston Flying Club Advisory (122.800 MHz).

There is an instrument landing system servicing runway 19, on the frequency 111.3 MHz.

Kingston also had a non-directional beacon (NDB) that transmitted "YGK" in Morse code on the longwave radio frequency of 263 kHz. It was located at 44°17′48″N 76°36′20″W.

== Operations ==
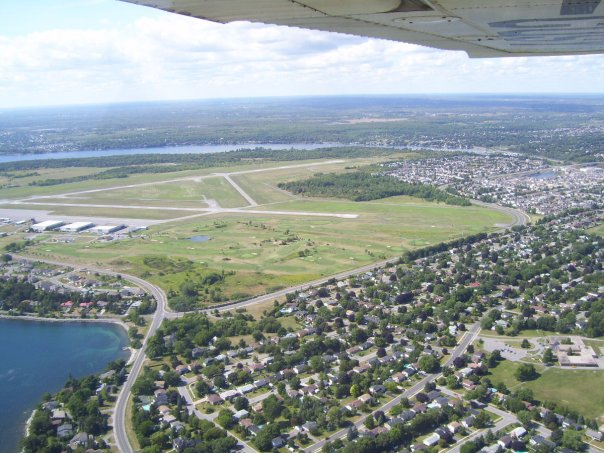
Kingston Airport from the air

Kingston is a mandatory frequency airport with an operating flight service station. The airport also supports a large amount of general aviation traffic, including flight training and general recreational flying. As one of the only public airports to offer an ILS approach along the corridor between Montréal–Trudeau and Toronto–Pearson (along with Ottawa Macdonald–Cartier), the Kingston airport is an important alternate during poor weather conditions.

Kingston Flying Club, a flight school and charter operation, is located in hangar #5.
