= Kingstone, Somerset =

Village in Somerset, England

Coordinates: 50.9175°N 2.8904°W

Kingstone
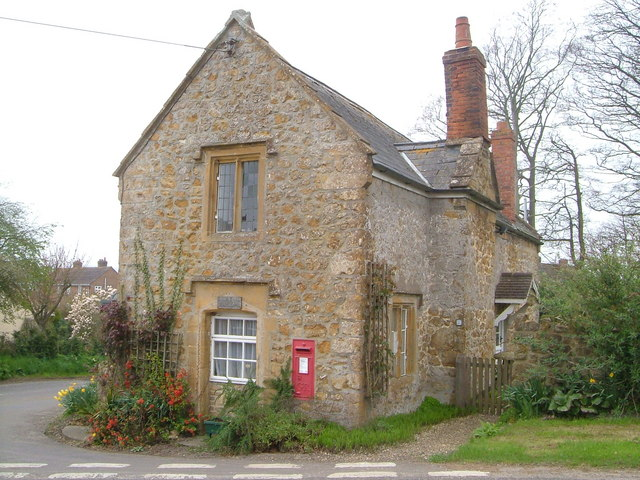
- Old Toll House

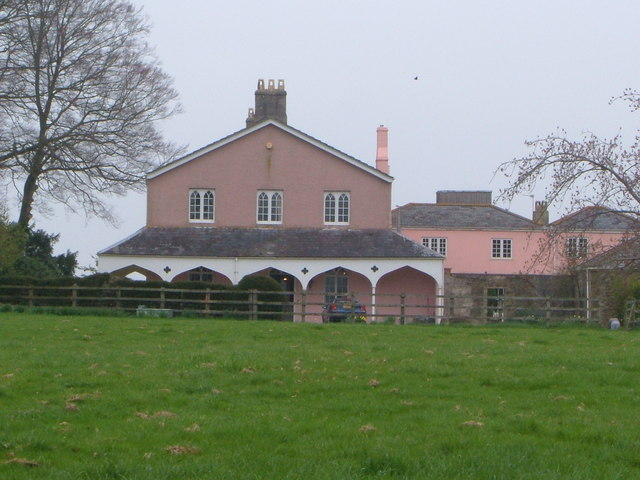
- Wake Hill

- Location within Somerset
- Population: 83 (2011)
- OS grid reference: ST375135
- Unitary authority: Somerset
- Ceremonial county: Somerset
- Region: South West
- Country: England
- Sovereign state: United Kingdom
- Post town: ILMINSTER
- Postcode district: TA19
- Dialling code: 01460
- Police: Avon and Somerset
- Fire: Devon and Somerset
- Ambulance: South Western
- UK Parliament: Yeovil

Kingstone is a village and civil parish in Somerset, England, situated near Ilminster, 5 miles (8.0 km) north east of Chard in the South Somerset district. The village has a population of 83.

The parish includes the village of Allowenshay which was the name of the parish from 1280.

== History ==
=== Kingstone ===
The village name means Kings settlement, which it was until King Edmund gave the manor to St Dunstan, as abbot of Glastonbury Abbey in 940. The estate was valued at this time at eight hides. After the Norman Conquest it was lost to the Count of Mortain, William the Conqueror's brother Robert. It was later held by the Arundell family (1461-1663) and then by the Pouletts of Hinton St George until the 20th century. In the medieval period it was the site of a deer park.

=== Allowenshay ===
The settlement at Allowenshay, is mentioned in 1280 as Alwynesheye derived from the Saxon personal name Alwine. After 1300 Allowenshay became the largest settlement and was the name of the local manor. Archaeology from this time reveal a chapel, though a manor house is yet to be found. However, just north of Allowenshay, fields called the Park, Lower, Higher, and Middle Park, surrounded by the remains of a bank and ditch may indicate the remains of a park by John de Burgh circa 1260.

== Governance ==
The parish council has responsibility for local issues, including setting an annual precept (local rate) to cover the council's operating costs and producing annual accounts for public scrutiny. The parish council evaluates local planning applications and works with the local police, district council officers, and neighbourhood watch groups on matters of crime, security, and traffic. The parish council's role also includes initiating projects for the maintenance and repair of parish facilities, as well as consulting with the district council on the maintenance, repair, and improvement of highways, drainage, footpaths, public transport, and street cleaning. Conservation matters (including trees and listed buildings) and environmental issues are also the responsibility of the council.

The village falls within the Non-metropolitan district of South Somerset, which was formed on 1 April 1974 under the Local Government Act 1972, having previously been part of Chard Rural District. The district council is responsible for local planning and building control, local roads, council housing, environmental health, markets and fairs, refuse collection and recycling, cemeteries and crematoria, leisure services, parks, and tourism.

It is also part of the Yeovil county constituency represented in the House of Commons of the Parliament of the United Kingdom. It elects one member of parliament (MP) by the first past the post system of election.

== Landmarks ==
Kingstone Farmhouse dates from the early 16th century.

== Religious sites ==
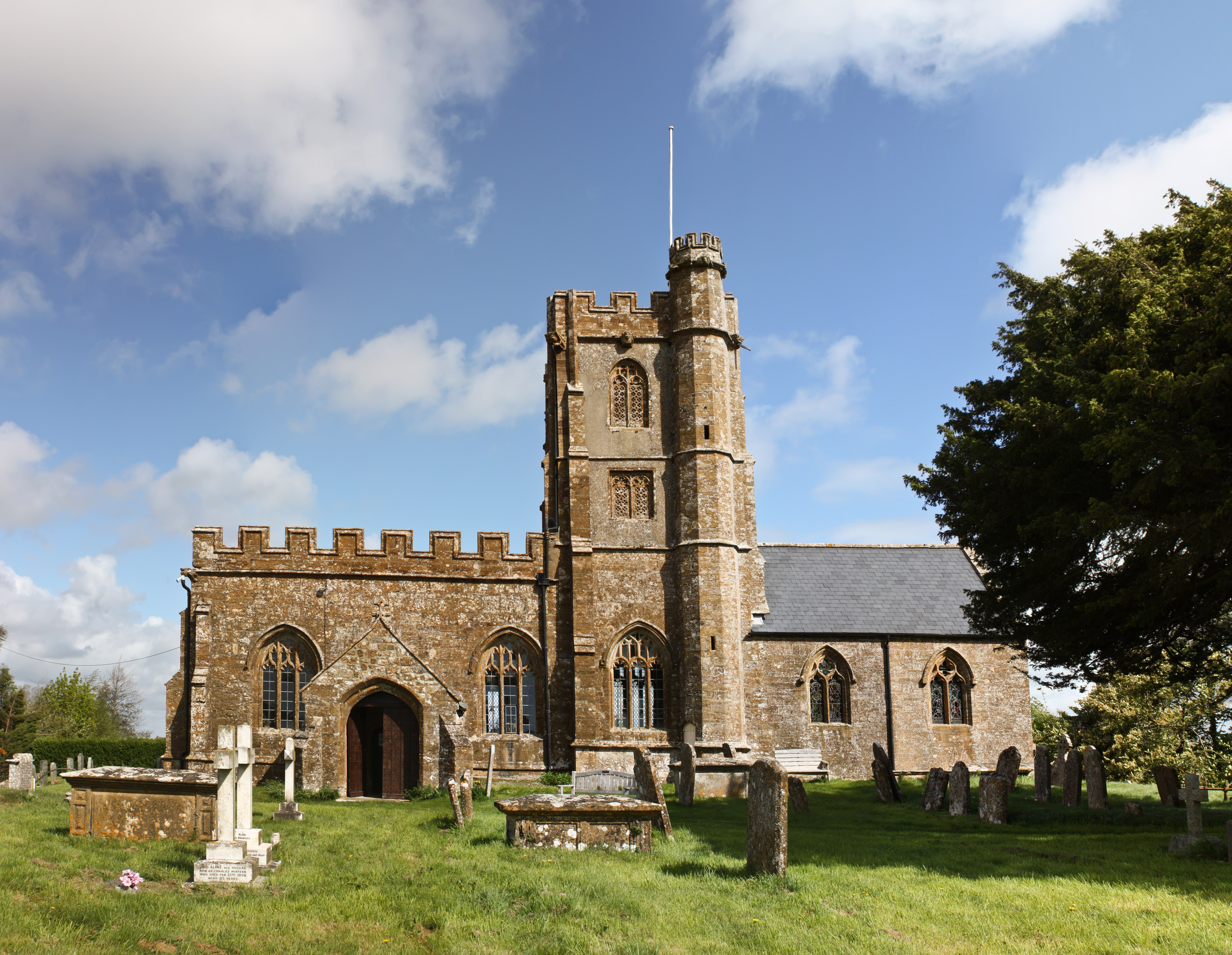
Church of St John the Evangelist and All Saints

The Anglican parish Church of St. John the Evangelist and All Saints was recorded by 1291. The porch and chancel date from the 14th century with the remainder of the building dating from the 15th century.
