= Kingston Bible College =

College in Kingston, Nova Scotia, Canada

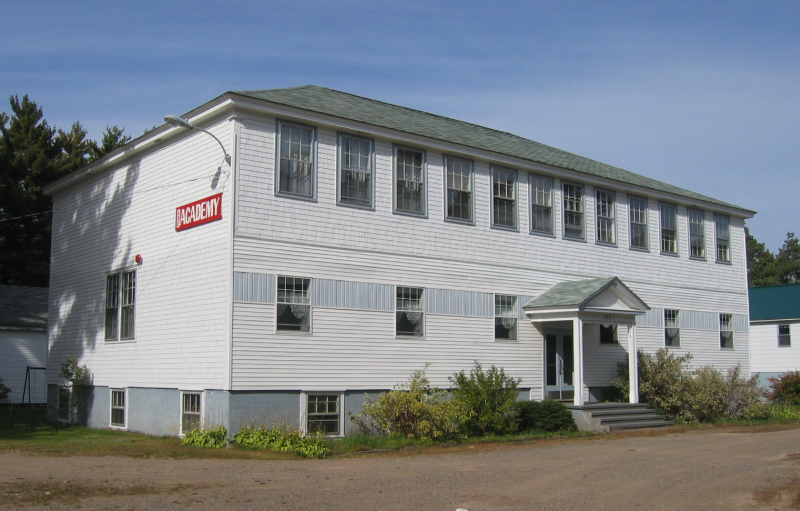

Location
- 743 Academic Avenue, RR 5 Kingston, Nova Scotia, B0P 1R0; Canada
- Coordinates: 44°58′17″N 64°56′20″W

Information
- Funding type: Private
- Religious affiliation: Independent Baptist

Kingston Bible College (KBC) is an Independent Fundamental Baptist College located in Kingston, Nova Scotia.

KBC teaches a literal interpretation of the Book of Genesis, including young-earth creationism.

== See also ==
- Kingston Bible College Academy
