= Kingston Bridge =

Kingston Bridge may refer to:

- Kingston Bridge (Kingston, New Jersey), a bridge across the Millstone River in New Jersey, U.S.
- Kingston Bridge, Glasgow, a bridge across the River Clyde in Glasgow, Scotland
- Kingston Bridge, London, a bridge across the River Thames in Kingston upon Thames, England
  - Kingston Railway Bridge
- Kingston–Rhinecliff Bridge, a bridge across the Hudson River in New York, U.S.
- Kingston on Murray Bridge, a crossing of the Murray River, Australia
