= List of United Kingdom locations: Kib-Kin =

The United Kingdom

This is part of the list of United Kingdom locations: a gazetteer of place names in the United Kingdom showing each place's locality and geographical coordinates.

== Ki ==
=== Kib-Kim ===
Location	Locality	Coordinates (links to map & photo sources)	OS grid reference
Kibbear	Somerset	50.98°N 03.11°W	ST2221
Kibblesworth	Gateshead	54.89°N 01.62°W	NZ2456
Kibworth Beauchamp	Leicestershire	52.53°N 00.99°W	SP6893
Kibworth Harcourt	Leicestershire	52.53°N 00.99°W	SP6894
Kidbrooke	Greenwich	51.46°N 00.02°E	TQ4176
Kidburngill	Cumbria	54.57°N 03.45°W	NY0621
Kiddal Lane End	Leeds	53.84°N 01.39°W	SE4039
Kiddemore Green	Staffordshire	52.66°N 02.22°W	SJ8508
Kidderminster	Worcestershire	52.38°N 02.26°W	SO8276
Kiddington	Oxfordshire	51.89°N 01.40°W	SP4122
Kiddshill	Aberdeenshire	57.47°N 02.11°W	NJ9343
Kidd's Moor	Norfolk	52.58°N 01.11°E	TG1103
Kidlington	Oxfordshire	51.81°N 01.29°W	SP4913
Kidmore End	Oxfordshire	51.50°N 01.00°W	SU6979
Kidnal	Cheshire	53.03°N 02.79°W	SJ4749
Kidsgrove	Staffordshire	53.08°N 02.25°W	SJ8354
Kidwelly	Carmarthenshire	51.73°N 04.31°W	SN4006
Kiel Crofts	Argyll and Bute	56.49°N 05.41°W	NM9039
Kielder	Northumberland	55.23°N 02.59°W	NY6293
Kiff Green	Berkshire	51.40°N 01.18°W	SU5768
Kilbarchan	Renfrewshire	55.83°N 04.55°W	NS4063
Kilberry	Argyll and Bute	55.81°N 05.65°W	NR7164
Kilberry Head	Argyll and Bute	55.81°N 05.66°W	NR708639
Kilbirnie	North Ayrshire	55.75°N 04.69°W	NS3154
Kilbowie	West Dunbartonshire	55.90°N 04.40°W	NS5071
Kilbride	Argyll and Bute	56.28°N 05.63°W	NM7516
Kilbridemore	Argyll and Bute	56.06°N 05.16°W	NS0390
Kilburn	Brent	51.53°N 00.21°W	TQ2483
Kilburn	North Yorkshire	54.20°N 01.21°W	SE5179
Kilburn	Derbyshire	53.00°N 01.43°W	SK3845
Kilby	Leicestershire	52.54°N 01.08°W	SP6295
Kilby Bridge	Leicestershire	52.56°N 01.10°W	SP6197
Kilchattan Bay	Argyll and Bute	55.75°N 05.02°W	NS1055
Kilchenzie	Argyll and Bute	55.45°N 05.68°W	NR6724
Kilchiaran	Argyll and Bute	55.75°N 06.46°W	NR2060
Kilchoan	Highland	56.69°N 06.11°W	NM4863
Kilchoman	Argyll and Bute	55.78°N 06.45°W	NR2163
Kilchrenan	Argyll and Bute	56.34°N 05.18°W	NN0322
Kilconquhar	Fife	56.20°N 02.83°W	NO4802
Kilcot	Gloucestershire	51.92°N 02.45°W	SO6925
Kilcoy	Highland	57.52°N 04.38°W	NH5751
Kilcreggan	Argyll and Bute	55.98°N 04.83°W	NS2380
Kildale	North Yorkshire	54.47°N 01.07°W	NZ6009
Kildary	Highland	57.74°N 04.08°W	NH7675
Kildonan	Highland	57.49°N 06.42°W	NG3554
Kildonan	North Ayrshire	55.44°N 05.13°W	NS0221
Kildonnan or Kildonan (Eigg)	Highland	56.88°N 06.13°W	NM4885
Kildrum	North Lanarkshire	55.95°N 03.98°W	NS7675
Kildrummy	Aberdeenshire	57.24°N 02.89°W	NJ4617
Kilduncan	Fife	56.29°N 02.69°W	NO5712
Kildwick	North Yorkshire	53.90°N 01.98°W	SE0145
Kilfinan	Argyll and Bute	55.95°N 05.31°W	NR9378
Kilgetty	Pembrokeshire	51.73°N 04.72°W	SN1207
Kilgrammie	South Ayrshire	55.27°N 04.75°W	NS2501
Kilgwrrwg Common	Monmouthshire	51.67°N 02.76°W	ST4798
Kilhallon	Cornwall	50.35°N 04.71°W	SX0754
Kilham	Northumberland	55.58°N 02.19°W	NT8832
Kilham	East Riding of Yorkshire	54.06°N 00.38°W	TA0664
Kili Holm	Orkney Islands	59.17°N 02.92°W	HY474327
Kilkenneth	Argyll and Bute	56.48°N 06.97°W	NL9444
Kilkenny	Gloucestershire	51.86°N 02.00°W	SP0018
Kilkerran	Argyll and Bute	55.41°N 05.60°W	NR7219
Kilkhampton	Cornwall	50.87°N 04.48°W	SS2511
Killamarsh	Derbyshire	53.31°N 01.32°W	SK4580
Killaworgey	Cornwall	50.40°N 04.95°W	SW9060
Killay	Swansea	51.61°N 04.02°W	SS6093
Killean	Argyll and Bute	55.63°N 05.67°W	NR6944
Killearn	Stirling	56.03°N 04.37°W	NS5285
Killegray	Western Isles	57.73°N 07.08°W	NF975835
Killen	Highland	57.59°N 04.22°W	NH6758
Killerby	Darlington	54.56°N 01.70°W	NZ1919
Killichonan	Perth and Kinross	56.69°N 04.38°W	NN5458
Killiecrankie	Perth and Kinross	56.73°N 03.78°W	NN9162
Killilan	Highland	57.31°N 05.42°W	NG9430
Killimster	Highland	58.48°N 03.18°W	ND3156
Killin	Stirling	56.45°N 04.32°W	NN5732
Killingbeck	Leeds	53.80°N 01.50°W	SE3334
Killinghall	North Yorkshire	54.01°N 01.57°W	SE2858
Killington	Devon	51.19°N 03.91°W	SS6646
Killington	Cumbria	54.28°N 02.60°W	SD6188
Killingworth	North Tyneside	55.03°N 01.57°W	NZ2771
Killingworth Moor	North Tyneside	55.02°N 01.56°W	NZ2870
Killingworth Village	North Tyneside	55.02°N 01.56°W	NZ2870
Killinochonoch	Argyll and Bute	56.09°N 05.49°W	NR8395
Killivose	Cornwall	50.19°N 05.30°W	SW6438
Killochyett	Scottish Borders	55.69°N 02.87°W	NT4545
Kilmacolm	Inverclyde	55.88°N 04.62°W	NS3669
Kilmahog	Stirling	56.24°N 04.24°W	NN6108
Kilmahumaig	Argyll and Bute	56.07°N 05.56°W	NR7893
Kilmaluag	Highland	57.67°N 06.32°W	NG4273
Kilmany	Fife	56.37°N 03.00°W	NO3821
Kilmarie	Highland	57.17°N 06.07°W	NG5417
Kilmarnock	East Ayrshire	55.60°N 04.50°W	NS4237
Kilmartin	Argyll and Bute	56.12°N 05.49°W	NR8398
Kilmaurs	East Ayrshire	55.63°N 04.54°W	NS4041
Kilmelford	Argyll and Bute	56.26°N 05.48°W	NM8413
Kilmeny	Argyll and Bute	55.80°N 06.16°W	NR3965
Kilmersdon	Somerset	51.26°N 02.44°W	ST6952
Kilmeston	Hampshire	51.03°N 01.15°W	SU5926
Kilmichael Beg	Argyll and Bute	56.08°N 05.29°W	NR9593
Kilmichael Glassary	Argyll and Bute	56.08°N 05.45°W	NR8593
Kilmichael of Inverlussa	Argyll and Bute	56.00°N 05.57°W	NR7785
Kilmington	Wiltshire	51.12°N 02.33°W	ST7736
Kilmington	Devon	50.76°N 03.03°W	SY2797
Kilmington Common	Wiltshire	51.11°N 02.32°W	ST7735
Kilmoluaig	Argyll and Bute	56.50°N 06.94°W	NL9646
Kilmonivaig	Highland	56.90°N 05.00°W	NN1783
Kilmorack	Highland	57.46°N 04.51°W	NH4944
Kilmore	Highland	57.09°N 05.88°W	NG6507
Kilmore	Argyll and Bute	56.37°N 05.43°W	NM8825
Kilmory	North Ayrshire	55.44°N 05.22°W	NR9621
Kilmory	Argyll and Bute	55.91°N 05.68°W	NR7075
Kilmory	Highland	56.75°N 06.05°W	NM5270
Kilmuir (Skye)	Highland	57.64°N 06.39°W	NG3870
Kilmuir (Duirinish)	Highland	57.43°N 06.58°W	NG2547
Kilmuir (Easter Ross)	Highland	57.73°N 04.10°W	NH7573
Kilmuir (Black Isle)	Highland	57.51°N 04.22°W	NH6749
Kilmun	Argyll and Bute	55.98°N 04.93°W	NS1781
Kilnave	Argyll and Bute	55.85°N 06.34°W	NR2871
Kilncadzow	South Lanarkshire	55.71°N 03.78°W	NS8848
Kilndown	Kent	51.08°N 00.42°E	TQ7035
Kiln Green	Berkshire	51.49°N 00.83°W	SU8178
Kiln Green	Herefordshire	51.86°N 02.58°W	SO6019
Kilnhill	Cumbria	54.67°N 03.22°W	NY2132
Kilnhurst	Rotherham	53.46°N 01.30°W	SK4697
Kilninian	Argyll and Bute	56.52°N 06.24°W	NM3945
Kilninver	Argyll and Bute	56.33°N 05.52°W	NM8221
Kilnsea	East Riding of Yorkshire	53.61°N 00.13°E	TA4115
Kilnsey	North Yorkshire	54.09°N 02.04°W	SD9767
Kilnwick	East Riding of Yorkshire	53.92°N 00.49°W	SE9949
Kilnwick Percy	East Riding of Yorkshire	53.94°N 00.75°W	SE8250
Kiloran	Argyll and Bute	56.08°N 06.19°W	NR3996
Kilpatrick	North Ayrshire	55.49°N 05.32°W	NR9027
Kilpeck	Herefordshire	51.96°N 02.81°W	SO4430
Kilpheder	Western Isles	57.14°N 07.39°W	NF7419
Kilphedir	Highland	58.13°N 03.73°W	NC9818
Kilpin	East Riding of Yorkshire	53.72°N 00.83°W	SE7726
Kilpin Pike	East Riding of Yorkshire	53.72°N 00.84°W	SE7626
Kilrenny	Fife	56.22°N 02.69°W	NO5704
Kilsby	Northamptonshire	52.33°N 01.17°W	SP5671
Kilspindie	Perth and Kinross	56.41°N 03.28°W	NO2125
Kilsyth	North Lanarkshire	55.97°N 04.06°W	NS7178
Kiltarlity	Highland	57.43°N 04.50°W	NH5041
Kilton	Nottinghamshire	53.30°N 01.11°W	SK5979
Kilton	Redcar and Cleveland	54.55°N 00.91°W	NZ7018
Kilton	Somerset	51.18°N 03.20°W	ST1643
Kilton Thorpe	Redcar and Cleveland	54.54°N 00.93°W	NZ6917
Kilvaxter	Highland	57.63°N 06.39°W	NG3869
Kilve	Somerset	51.17°N 03.23°W	ST1443
Kilvington	Nottinghamshire	52.96°N 00.81°W	SK8042
Kilwinning	North Ayrshire	55.65°N 04.70°W	NS3043
Kimberley	Nottinghamshire	52.99°N 01.27°W	SK4944
Kimberley	Norfolk	52.59°N 01.05°E	TG0704
Kimberworth	Rotherham	53.43°N 01.39°W	SK4093
Kimberworth Park	Rotherham	53.44°N 01.39°W	SK4094
Kimblesworth	Durham	54.81°N 01.61°W	NZ2547
Kimble Wick	Buckinghamshire	51.75°N 00.84°W	SP8007
Kimbolton	Cambridgeshire	52.29°N 00.40°W	TL0967
Kimbolton	Herefordshire	52.24°N 02.70°W	SO5261
Kimbridge	Hampshire	51.02°N 01.53°W	SU3325
Kimcote	Leicestershire	52.46°N 01.14°W	SP5886
Kimmeridge	Dorset	50.61°N 02.12°W	SY9179
Kimmerston	Northumberland	55.60°N 02.08°W	NT9535
Kimpton	Hampshire	51.21°N 01.60°W	SU2846
Kimpton	Hertfordshire	51.84°N 00.30°W	TL1718
Kimworthy	Devon	50.88°N 04.40°W	SS3112

=== Kin ===
Location	Locality	Coordinates (links to map & photo sources)	OS grid reference
Kinbeachie	Highland	57.62°N 04.29°W	NH6362
Kinbrace	Highland	58.25°N 03.94°W	NC8631
Kinbuck	Stirling	56.21°N 03.95°W	NN7904
Kincaidston	South Ayrshire	55.43°N 04.60°W	NS3519
Kincaple	Fife	56.35°N 02.87°W	NO4618
Kincardine	Highland	57.86°N 04.36°W	NH6089
Kincardine	Fife	56.06°N 03.72°W	NS9387
Kincardine O'Neil	Aberdeenshire	57.08°N 02.69°W	NO5899
Kincluny	Aberdeenshire	57.06°N 02.33°W	NO8097
Kincorth	City of Aberdeen	57.11°N 02.11°W	NJ9303
Kincraig	Highland	57.12°N 03.93°W	NH8305
Kindallachan	Perth and Kinross	56.62°N 03.64°W	NN9949
Kine Moor	Barnsley	53.53°N 01.59°W	SE2704
Kineton	Warwickshire	52.15°N 01.51°W	SP3351
Kineton	Gloucestershire	51.93°N 01.87°W	SP0926
Kineton Green	Solihull	52.42°N 01.82°W	SP1281
Kinfauns	Perth and Kinross	56.38°N 03.36°W	NO1622
Kingairloch	Highland	56.61°N 05.52°W	NM8452
Kingarth	Argyll and Bute	55.76°N 05.04°W	NS0956
Kingates	Isle of Wight	50.59°N 01.28°W	SZ5177
Kingbeare	Cornwall	50.54°N 04.44°W	SX2774
Kingcoed	Monmouthshire	51.74°N 02.82°W	SO4305
Kingdown	Bath and North East Somerset	51.37°N 02.69°W	ST5264
King Edward	Aberdeenshire	57.60°N 02.48°W	NJ7157
Kingerby	Lincolnshire	53.41°N 00.42°W	TF0592
Kingfield	Surrey	51.30°N 00.56°W	TQ0057
Kingford (Torridge)	Devon	50.82°N 04.44°W	SS2806
Kingford (North Devon)	Devon	50.95°N 03.96°W	SS6219
Kingham	Oxfordshire	51.90°N 01.63°W	SP2523
Kinghay	Wiltshire	51.06°N 02.15°W	ST8929
Kingholm Quay	Dumfries and Galloway	55.04°N 03.61°W	NX9773
Kinghorn	Fife	56.06°N 03.19°W	NT2686
Kinglassie	Fife	56.16°N 03.24°W	NT2398
Kingledoors	Scottish Borders	55.53°N 03.42°W	NT1028
Kingoodie	Perth and Kinross	56.44°N 03.08°W	NO3329
King's Acre	Herefordshire	52.06°N 02.77°W	SO4741
Kingsand	Cornwall	50.32°N 04.20°W	SX4350
Kingsash	Buckinghamshire	51.73°N 00.72°W	SP8805
Kingsbarns	Fife	56.29°N 02.66°W	NO5912
Kingsbridge	Somerset	51.12°N 03.45°W	SS9837
Kingsbridge	Devon	50.28°N 03.78°W	SX7344
Kings Bromley	Staffordshire	52.74°N 01.82°W	SK1216
Kingsburgh	Highland	57.51°N 06.36°W	NG3955
Kingsbury	Warwickshire	52.56°N 01.69°W	SP2196
Kingsbury	Brent	51.57°N 00.28°W	TQ1988
Kingsbury Episcopi	Somerset	50.98°N 02.81°W	ST4321
Kingsbury Regis	Somerset	50.96°N 02.47°W	ST6719
King's Caple	Herefordshire	51.94°N 02.64°W	SO5628
Kingscavil	West Lothian	55.96°N 03.55°W	NT0376
Kingsclere	Hampshire	51.31°N 01.25°W	SU5258
Kingsclere Woodlands	Hampshire	51.34°N 01.24°W	SU5361
King's Cliffe	Northamptonshire	52.56°N 00.52°W	TL0097
Kingscote	Gloucestershire	51.66°N 02.27°W	ST8196
Kingscott	Devon	50.94°N 04.09°W	SS5318
King's Coughton	Warwickshire	52.22°N 01.88°W	SP0858
Kingscourt	Gloucestershire	51.72°N 02.23°W	SO8403
Kingscross	North Ayrshire	55.50°N 05.10°W	NS0428
Kingscross Point	North Ayrshire	55.50°N 05.08°W	NS050278
Kingsditch	Gloucestershire	51.91°N 02.10°W	SO9324
Kingsdon	Somerset	51.03°N 02.70°W	ST5126
Kingsdon	Devon	50.74°N 03.06°W	SY2594
Kingsdown (Dover)	Kent	51.18°N 01.39°E	TR3748
Kingsdown (Swale)	Kent	51.29°N 00.76°E	TQ9359
Kingsdown	Swindon	51.59°N 01.77°W	SU1688
Kingsdown (near Corsham)	Wiltshire	51.40°N 02.27°W	ST8167
King's Dyke	Cambridgeshire	52.54°N 00.17°W	TL2496
Kingseat	Fife	56.09°N 03.41°W	NT1290
Kingseathill	Fife	56.07°N 03.44°W	NT1088
King's End	Oxfordshire	51.89°N 01.15°W	SP5822
King's End	Worcestershire	52.15°N 02.26°W	SO8251
Kingsett	Devon	50.60°N 04.10°W	SX5180
Kingsey	Buckinghamshire	51.74°N 00.92°W	SP7406
Kingsfield	Herefordshire	52.13°N 02.70°W	SO5249
Kingsfold	West Sussex	51.11°N 00.34°W	TQ1636
Kingsfold	Lancashire	53.72°N 02.71°W	SD5326
Kingsford	East Ayrshire	55.70°N 04.48°W	NS4448
Kingsford	Worcestershire	52.42°N 02.28°W	SO8181
King's Furlong	Hampshire	51.25°N 01.11°W	SU6251
Kingsgate	Kent	51.37°N 01.43°E	TR3970
King's Green	Gloucestershire	51.99°N 02.35°W	SO7633
King's Green	Worcestershire	52.23°N 02.33°W	SO7760
Kingshall Green	Suffolk	52.20°N 00.79°E	TL9160
Kingshall Street	Suffolk	52.21°N 00.79°E	TL9161
Kingsheanton	Devon	51.11°N 04.07°W	SS5537
King's Heath	Birmingham	52.42°N 01.89°W	SP0781
King's Heath	Northamptonshire	52.25°N 00.93°W	SP7362
King's Hedges	Cambridgeshire	52.22°N 00.12°E	TL4561
King's Hill	Walsall	52.56°N 02.03°W	SO9896
Kingshill	Gloucestershire	51.68°N 02.36°W	ST7598
Kingshill	Swindon	51.55°N 01.79°W	SU1484
Kings Hill	Gloucestershire	51.70°N 01.95°W	SP0301
Kingsholm	Gloucestershire	51.86°N 02.24°W	SO8319
Kingshouse	Stirling	56.35°N 04.33°W	NN5620
Kingshurst	Birmingham	52.49°N 01.76°W	SP1688
Kingside Hill	Cumbria	54.84°N 03.32°W	NY1551
Kingskerswell	Devon	50.49°N 03.58°W	SX8867
Kingskettle	Fife	56.25°N 03.13°W	NO3008
Kingsknowe	City of Edinburgh	55.91°N 03.26°W	NT2170
Kingsland	Dorset	50.77°N 02.78°W	SY4597
Kingsland	Herefordshire	52.24°N 02.82°W	SO4461
Kingsland	Hackney	51.53°N 00.08°W	TQ3384
Kingsland	Isle of Anglesey	53.29°N 04.64°W	SH2481
Kingsland	Shropshire	52.69°N 02.77°W	SJ4811
Kings Langley	Hertfordshire	51.70°N 00.45°W	TL0702
Kingsley	Hampshire	51.13°N 00.88°W	SU7838
Kingsley	Staffordshire	53.01°N 02.00°W	SK0046
Kingsley	Cheshire	53.26°N 02.67°W	SJ5574
Kingsley Green	West Sussex	51.06°N 00.73°W	SU8930
Kingsley Holt	Staffordshire	53.01°N 01.97°W	SK0246
Kingsley Moor	Staffordshire	53.01°N 02.01°W	SJ9946
Kingsley Park	Northamptonshire	52.25°N 00.88°W	SP7662
Kingslow	Shropshire	52.57°N 02.31°W	SO7998
King's Lynn	Norfolk	52.75°N 00.38°E	TF6120
King's Meaburn	Cumbria	54.58°N 02.58°W	NY6221
Kingsmead	Hampshire	50.91°N 01.17°W	SU5813
King's Mills	Leicestershire	52.83°N 01.39°W	SK4127
King's Mills	Wrexham	53.03°N 02.98°W	SJ3449
Kingsmoor	Essex	51.74°N 00.08°E	TL4407
Kings Moss	St Helens	53.50°N 02.75°W	SD5001
Kingsmuir	Angus	56.63°N 02.86°W	NO4749
Kings Muir	Scottish Borders	55.63°N 03.19°W	NT2539
King's Newnham	Warwickshire	52.38°N 01.34°W	SP4577
Kings Newton	Derbyshire	52.83°N 01.42°W	SK3926
Kingsnordley	Shropshire	52.48°N 02.34°W	SO7787
Kingsnorth	Kent	51.11°N 00.85°E	TR0039
Kings Norton	Birmingham	52.40°N 01.92°W	SP0579
King's Norton	Leicestershire	52.59°N 00.99°W	SK6800
King's Nympton	Devon	50.95°N 03.88°W	SS6819
Kings Park	City of Glasgow	55.82°N 04.25°W	NS5961
King's Pyon	Herefordshire	52.14°N 02.83°W	SO4350
Kings Ripton	Cambridgeshire	52.36°N 00.15°W	TL2676
King's Somborne	Hampshire	51.07°N 01.48°W	SU3631
King's Stag	Dorset	50.88°N 02.39°W	ST7210
King's Stanley	Gloucestershire	51.72°N 02.27°W	SO8103
Kings Sutton	Northamptonshire	52.02°N 01.27°W	SP5036
King's Tamerton	Devon	50.40°N 04.18°W	SX4558
Kingstanding	Birmingham	52.54°N 01.88°W	SP0894
Kingsteignton	Devon	50.54°N 03.59°W	SX8773
Kingsteps	Highland	57.59°N 03.84°W	NH9057
King Sterndale	Derbyshire	53.24°N 01.86°W	SK0972
King's Thorn	Herefordshire	51.97°N 02.72°W	SO5031
Kingsthorpe	Northamptonshire	52.26°N 00.90°W	SP7563
Kingsthorpe Hollow	Northamptonshire	52.25°N 00.90°W	SP7562
Kingston	Cambridgeshire	52.17°N 00.04°W	TL3455
Kingston	City of Portsmouth	50.80°N 01.07°W	SU6501
Kingston (East Devon)	Devon	50.67°N 03.33°W	SY0687
Kingston (Kingswear)	Devon	50.34°N 03.54°W	SX9051
Kingston (South Hams)	Devon	50.30°N 03.92°W	SX6347
Kingston (North Dorset)	Dorset	50.88°N 02.35°W	ST7509
Kingston (Purbeck)	Dorset	50.61°N 02.07°W	SY9579
Kingston	East Lothian	56.02°N 02.73°W	NT5482
Kingston	Hampshire	50.81°N 01.80°W	SU1402
Kingston	Isle of Wight	50.62°N 01.33°W	SZ4781
Kingston	Kent	51.21°N 01.13°E	TR1951
Kingston	Milton Keynes	52.03°N 00.68°W	SP9038
Kingston	Moray	57.67°N 03.12°W	NJ3365
Kingston	Suffolk	52.07°N 01.29°E	TM2647
Kingston	Tameside	53.45°N 02.09°W	SJ9495
Kingston Bagpuize	Oxfordshire	51.67°N 01.42°W	SU4098
Kingston Blount	Oxfordshire	51.68°N 00.94°W	SU7399
Kingston by Sea	West Sussex	50.83°N 00.25°W	TQ2305
Kingston Deverill	Wiltshire	51.13°N 02.23°W	ST8437
Kingstone	Somerset	50.91°N 02.89°W	ST3713
Kingstone (Archenfield)	Herefordshire	52.01°N 02.84°W	SO4235
Kingstone (Weston under Penyard)	Herefordshire	51.91°N 02.53°W	SO6324
Kingstone	Barnsley	53.54°N 01.50°W	SE3305
Kingstone	Staffordshire	52.85°N 01.91°W	SK0629
Kingstone Winslow	Oxfordshire	51.56°N 01.62°W	SU2685
Kingston Gorse	West Sussex	50.79°N 00.46°W	TQ0801
Kingston Lisle	Oxfordshire	51.58°N 01.53°W	SU3287
Kingston Maurward	Dorset	50.71°N 02.41°W	SY7191
Kingston near Lewes	East Sussex	50.85°N 00.02°W	TQ3908
Kingston on Soar	Nottinghamshire	52.83°N 01.25°W	SK5027
Kingston Park	Newcastle upon Tyne	55.00°N 01.67°W	NZ2168
Kingston Russell	Dorset	50.71°N 02.59°W	SY5891
Kingston Seymour	North Somerset	51.39°N 02.86°W	ST4066
Kingston Stert	Oxfordshire	51.70°N 00.95°W	SP7201
Kingston St Mary	Somerset	51.05°N 03.11°W	ST2229
Kingston upon Hull	City of Kingston upon Hull	53.74°N 00.34°W	TA0929
Kingston upon Thames		51.41°N 00.30°W	TQ1870
Kingston Vale	Kingston upon Thames	51.42°N 00.26°W	TQ2171
Kingstown	Cumbria	54.92°N 02.95°W	NY3959
King Street	Essex	51.70°N 00.28°E	TL5803
King's Walden	Hertfordshire	51.89°N 00.31°W	TL1623
Kingsway	Bath and North East Somerset	51.36°N 02.38°W	ST7363
Kingsway	Cheshire	53.35°N 02.73°W	SJ5185
Kingswear	Devon	50.34°N 03.57°W	SX8851
Kingswinford	Dudley	52.49°N 02.17°W	SO8888
Kingswood	Cheshire	53.40°N 02.64°W	SJ5790
Kingswood	Essex	51.55°N 00.45°E	TQ7087
Kingswood	Gloucestershire	51.61°N 02.37°W	ST7491
Kingswood	Herefordshire	52.17°N 03.03°W	SO2954
Kingswood	Hertfordshire	51.68°N 00.40°W	TL1000
Kingswood	Kent	51.21°N 00.63°E	TQ8450
Kingswood	Powys	52.61°N 03.12°W	SJ2402
Kingswood	Somerset	51.12°N 03.28°W	ST1037
Kingswood	Surrey	51.28°N 00.22°W	TQ2456
Kingswood	Warwickshire	52.33°N 01.73°W	SP1871
Kingswood	City of Bristol	51.45°N 02.51°W	ST6473
Kingswood Brook	Warwickshire	52.32°N 01.72°W	SP1970
Kingswood Common	Staffordshire	52.61°N 02.23°W	SJ8402
Kingswood Common	Worcestershire	52.28°N 02.39°W	SO7365
Kings Worthy	Hampshire	51.09°N 01.30°W	SU4933
Kington	South Gloucestershire	51.60°N 02.55°W	ST6290
Kington	Herefordshire	52.19°N 03.04°W	SO2956
Kington	Worcestershire	52.19°N 02.01°W	SO9955
Kington Langley	Wiltshire	51.49°N 02.11°W	ST9277
Kington Magna	Dorset	51.00°N 02.34°W	ST7623
Kington St Michael	Wiltshire	51.49°N 02.14°W	ST9077
Kingussie	Highland	57.07°N 04.06°W	NH7500
Kingweston	Somerset	51.06°N 02.68°W	ST5230
Kinkell	Aberdeenshire	56.90°N 02.42°W	NO7479
Kinknockie	Aberdeenshire	57.46°N 02.00°W	NK0041
Kinkry Hill	Cumbria	55.06°N 02.76°W	NY5175
Kinlet	Shropshire	52.41°N 02.42°W	SO7180
Kinloch (Lairg)	Highland	58.26°N 04.83°W	NC3434
Kinloch (Rùm)	Highland	57.00°N 06.28°W	NM4099
Kinloch	Fife	56.29°N 03.16°W	NO2812
Kinloch	Western Isles	56.96°N 07.51°W	NL6599
Kinlochard	Stirling	56.18°N 04.49°W	NN4502
Kinlochbervie	Highland	58.45°N 05.07°W	NC2156
Kinlocheil	Highland	56.85°N 05.33°W	NM9779
Kinlochewe	Highland	57.59°N 05.31°W	NH0261
Kinlochleven	Highland	56.70°N 04.97°W	NN1861
Kinloch Laggan	Highland	56.96°N 04.40°W	NN5489
Kinlochmoidart	Highland	56.78°N 05.76°W	NM7072
Kinlochmore	Highland	56.71°N 04.97°W	NN1862
Kinloch Rannoch	Perth and Kinross	56.69°N 04.18°W	NN6658
Kinloid	Highland	56.91°N 05.86°W	NM6587
Kinloss	Moray	57.62°N 03.57°W	NJ0661
Kinmel Bay (Bae Cinmel)	Conwy	53.30°N 03.53°W	SH9880
Kinmuck	Aberdeenshire	57.26°N 02.31°W	NJ8119
Kinmylies	Highland	57.46°N 04.26°W	NH6444
Kinnadie	Aberdeenshire	57.47°N 02.06°W	NJ9643
Kinnaird (Atholl)	Perth and Kinross	56.71°N 03.71°W	NN9559
Kinnaird (Gowrie)	Perth and Kinross	56.43°N 03.23°W	NO2428
Kinnaird Head	Aberdeenshire	57.69°N 02.00°W	NJ998673
Kinnauld	Highland	57.98°N 04.14°W	NC7301
Kinneff	Aberdeenshire	56.85°N 02.24°W	NO8574
Kinneil	Falkirk	56.00°N 03.63°W	NS9880
Kinnell	Angus	56.64°N 02.65°W	NO6050
Kinnerley	Shropshire	52.77°N 02.99°W	SJ3320
Kinnersley	Herefordshire	52.13°N 02.96°W	SO3449
Kinnersley	Worcestershire	52.08°N 02.19°W	SO8743
Kinnerton	Powys	52.26°N 03.11°W	SO2463
Kinnerton Green	Flintshire	53.14°N 03.00°W	SJ3361
Kinnesswood	Perth and Kinross	56.20°N 03.33°W	NO1702
Kinninvie	Durham	54.58°N 01.92°W	NZ0521
Kinoulton	Nottinghamshire	52.86°N 01.00°W	SK6730
Kinross	Perth and Kinross	56.20°N 03.43°W	NO1102
Kinrossie	Perth and Kinross	56.47°N 03.33°W	NO1832
Kinsbourne Green	Hertfordshire	51.83°N 00.40°W	TL1016
Kinsey Heath	Cheshire	52.97°N 02.49°W	SJ6742
Kinsham	Worcestershire	52.01°N 02.10°W	SO9335
Kinsley	Wakefield	53.62°N 01.38°W	SE4114
Kinson	Bournemouth	50.76°N 01.91°W	SZ0696
Kintallan	Argyll and Bute	56.02°N 05.62°W	NR7487
Kintbury	Berkshire	51.39°N 01.45°W	SU3866
Kintessack	Moray	57.61°N 03.67°W	NJ0060
Kintillo	Perth and Kinross	56.33°N 03.40°W	NO1317
Kinton	Herefordshire	52.36°N 02.88°W	SO4074
Kinton	Shropshire	52.76°N 02.93°W	SJ3719
Kintore	Aberdeenshire	57.23°N 02.36°W	NJ7816
Kintra	Argyll and Bute	56.34°N 06.35°W	NM3125
Kinuachdrachd	Argyll and Bute	56.11°N 05.70°W	NR7098
Kinveachy	Highland	57.24°N 03.80°W	NH9118
Kinver	Staffordshire	52.44°N 02.23°W	SO8483
Kinwalsey	Warwickshire	52.46°N 01.63°W	SP2585
