= Kinloch =

Kinloch can refer to:

== People ==
- Kinloch Baronets
- Billy Kinloch (1874–1931), American baseball player
- Bobby Kinloch (1935–2014), Scottish football player
- Bruce Kinloch, author
- Sir Francis Kinloch, 3rd Baronet (1676–1747), scion of a noble family
- Francis Kinloch (Congressman) (1755–1826), American soldier, politician and Continental Congress delegate from South Carolina
- George Kinloch, Scottish MP
- George Ritchie Kinloch, Scottish ballad collector and antiquarian
- Sir John Kinloch, 2nd Baronet, Scottish MP, grandson of the above
- Jimmy Kinloch (died 1962), Scottish footballer (Partick Thistle F.C. and Scotland)
- Sir William Eric Kinloch Anderson, KT, FRSE
- David William Kinloch Anderson, Baron Anderson of Ipswich, KBE, QC, son of above
- Agnes Kinloch Kingston, wife of W.H.G. Kingston and the actual translator of Jules Verne's novels
- Valerie Kinloch, American writer and academic administrator

== Places ==
=== Scotland ===
- Kinloch, Fife, a location
- Kinloch, Lairg, a location in Highland
- Kinloch, Blairgowrie, a hamlet and civil parish in Perth and Kinross
- Kinloch, Coupar Angus, smaller settlement also in Perth and Kinrross
- Kinloch, Rùm, Highland
- Kinloch Hourn, Highland
- Kinloch Lodge, Tongue, Highland
- Kinloch Rannoch, Perth and Kinross
- Kinlochewe, Highland

=== Other locations ===
- Kinloch, Missouri, United States
- Kinloch, New Zealand
- Kinloch, Otago, New Zealand, a lakeside locality at the north end of Lake Wakatipu
