= Killivose =

Coordinates: 50.304°N 5.082°W

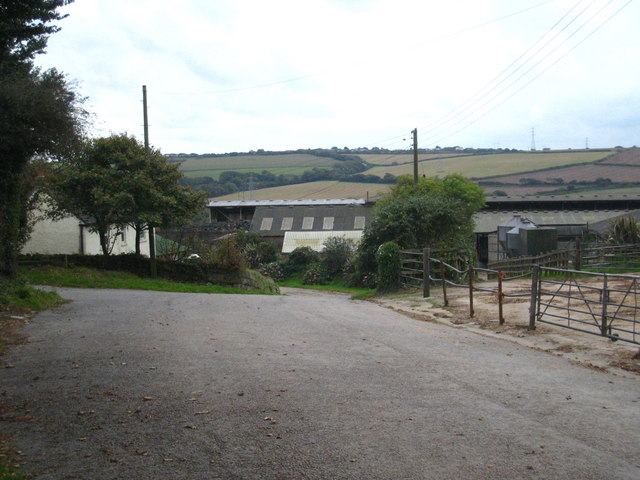
- Farm buildings at Killivose

- Location within Cornwall
- OS grid reference: SW806494
- Civil parish: St Allen
- Unitary authority: Cornwall
- Ceremonial county: Cornwall
- Region: South West
- Country: England
- Sovereign state: United Kingdom
- Post town: Truro
- Postcode district: TR4

Killivose is a hamlet in Cornwall, England. It is located south of Zelah and lies within the civil parish of St Allen. The settlement is administered as part of the Cornwall Council unitary authority area in South West England.

Killivose is a rural settlement within the historic county of Cornwall. Its population is included within the census figures for the civil parish of St Allen, rather than being recorded separately.

== See also ==
- List of places in Cornwall
