= Zelah =

Zelah may refer to:

- Zelah, Cornwall, village in Cornwall named after the Biblical Zelah
- Zelah, Judea, place mentioned in the Bible
- Zelah Clarke (born 1954), English actress

== See also ==
- Selah
