= Nairn =

Town and royal burgh in Scotland

Coordinates: 57.586°N 3.869°W

Nairn: Scottish Gaelic: Inbhir Narann
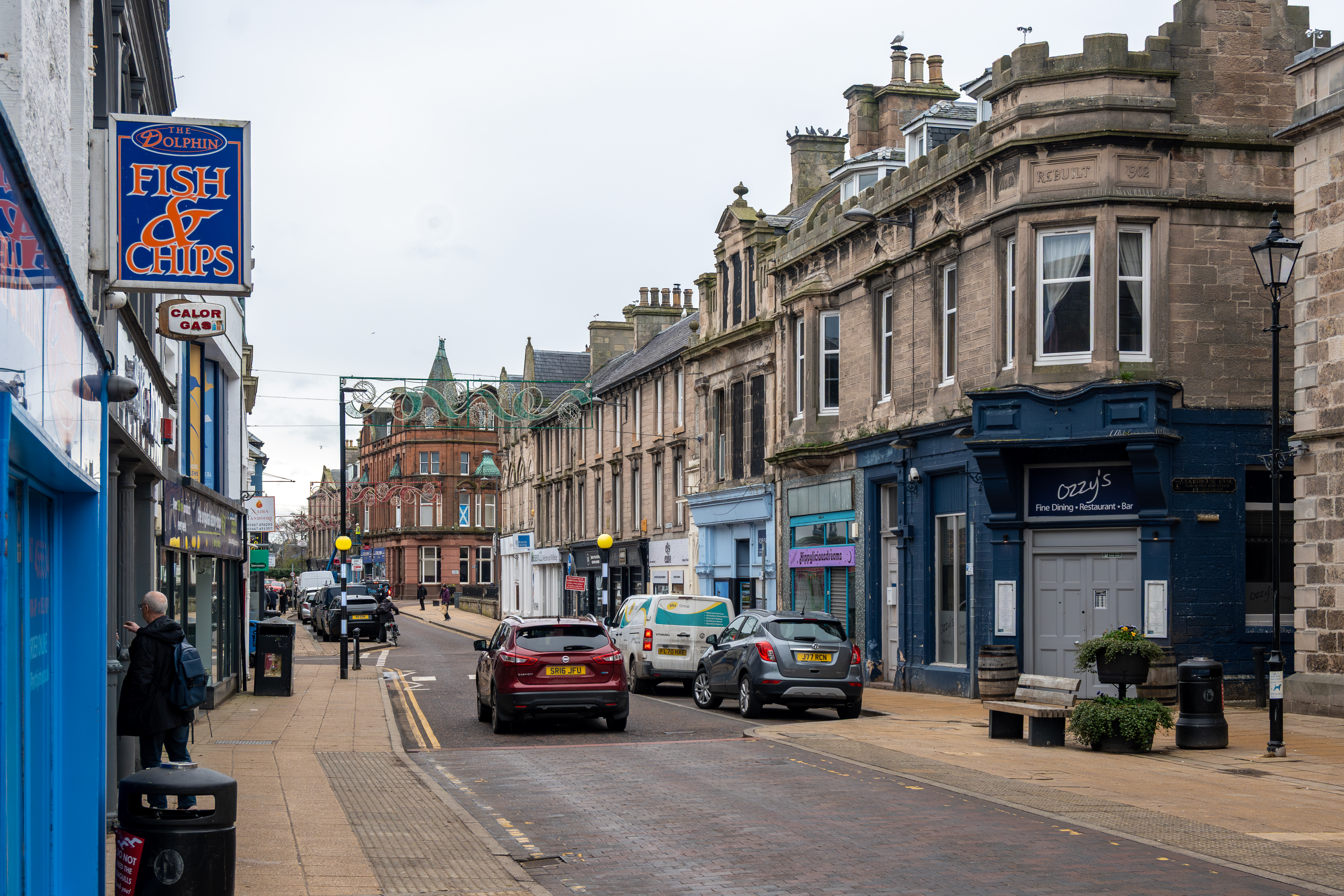
- Nairn High Street

- Location within the Highland council area
- Population: 9,582 (2022)
- OS grid reference: NH887563
  - Edinburgh: 116 mi (187 km)
  - London: 446 mi (718 km)
- Council area: Highland
- Lieutenancy area: Nairn
- Country: Scotland
- Sovereign state: United Kingdom
- Post town: NAIRN
- Postcode district: IV12
- Dialling code: 01667
- Police: Scotland
- Fire: Scottish
- Ambulance: Scottish
- UK Parliament: Moray West, Nairn and Strathspey
- Scottish Parliament: Inverness and Nairn

Nairn (/ˈnɛərn/; Scottish Gaelic: Inbhir Narann) is a town and former royal burgh in the Highland Council area of Scotland. It is an ancient fishing port and market town around 17 miles (27 km) east of Inverness, at the point where the River Nairn enters the Moray Firth. It is the traditional county town of Nairnshire.

At the 2022 census, Nairn had a population of 9,582, making it the third-largest settlement in the Highland Council area, behind Inverness and Fort William. Nairn is best known as a seaside resort, with two golf courses, beaches, a community centre and arts venue, a small theatre (The Little Theatre) and a small museum, providing information on the local area and incorporating the collection of the former Fishertown museum.

== History ==
The History of Nairn is a broad and diverse topic spanning its Palaeolithic and Mesolithic roots before recorded history, to the Picts and the visitation of Roman general Agricola, its possible founding under the name Ekkailsbakki by Sigurd, Earl of Orkney, its royal burgh status under David I, its strong links to monarchs and regents of Scotland and its strategic position in multiple wars and famine.

== Geography ==
Formerly part of the Supercontinent of Rodinia as evidenced by the discovery of Dalradian Supergroup rocks, Nairn encompasses a 2 5/8-by-1 1/2-mile (4-by-2.5-kilometre) position on the mouth of the River Nairn and is fronted by the North Sea at the Moray Firth with two extensive beaches, the east beach being predominantly sand with dune vegetation (such as marram grass) and the west having more rock though becoming more sand as it reaches the river mouth. The Culbin Sands forms part of one of the most extensive areas of stabilised blown sand in Britain. The soil by the coast is largely a thin and loose organic layer developing directly on the sand and this has been strengthened in areas such as Culbin for forestry.

The town itself is predominantly flat rising from sea level to 40 feet (12 metres) in Fishertown and the majority of the town sitting at 65 feet (20 metres) above sea level. Sections of Nairn do reach as high as 95 feet (29 metres) near Balblair. The low ground near the coast is fertile and the soil rich free loam over sand or gravel. In the town thin, rather acidic soils are present throughout. The alluvial plain has shown Permo-Triassic sandstones, thick accumulations of Jurassic sandstones and dark shales, and erosion by ice sheets. Excavation can reveal dark, muddy glacial deposits, with occasional fossils and shells.

As the land rises south we see Conifer forests and on the higher slopes we see heather moorland and montane vegetation. The wider Nairnshire and Moray area is 28% woodland, one of the most-wooded areas in Britain.

The Bar at Culbin appears to be migrating westwards at about 1.5 km per century, leaving a broad salt marsh in its lee. The soft coast also includes the flat, sweeping, wide and gently undulating Culbin Sands dune system, which culminates in the Lady Culbin dune (over 30m high), the largest in Britain.

— Turnbull Jeffrey Partnership, "NatureScot Review 101 – Moray and Nairn landscape character assessment"

Nairn beach front
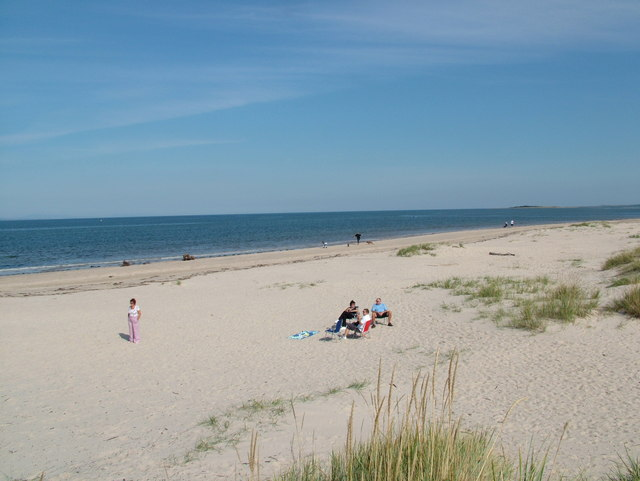
Nairn East Beach

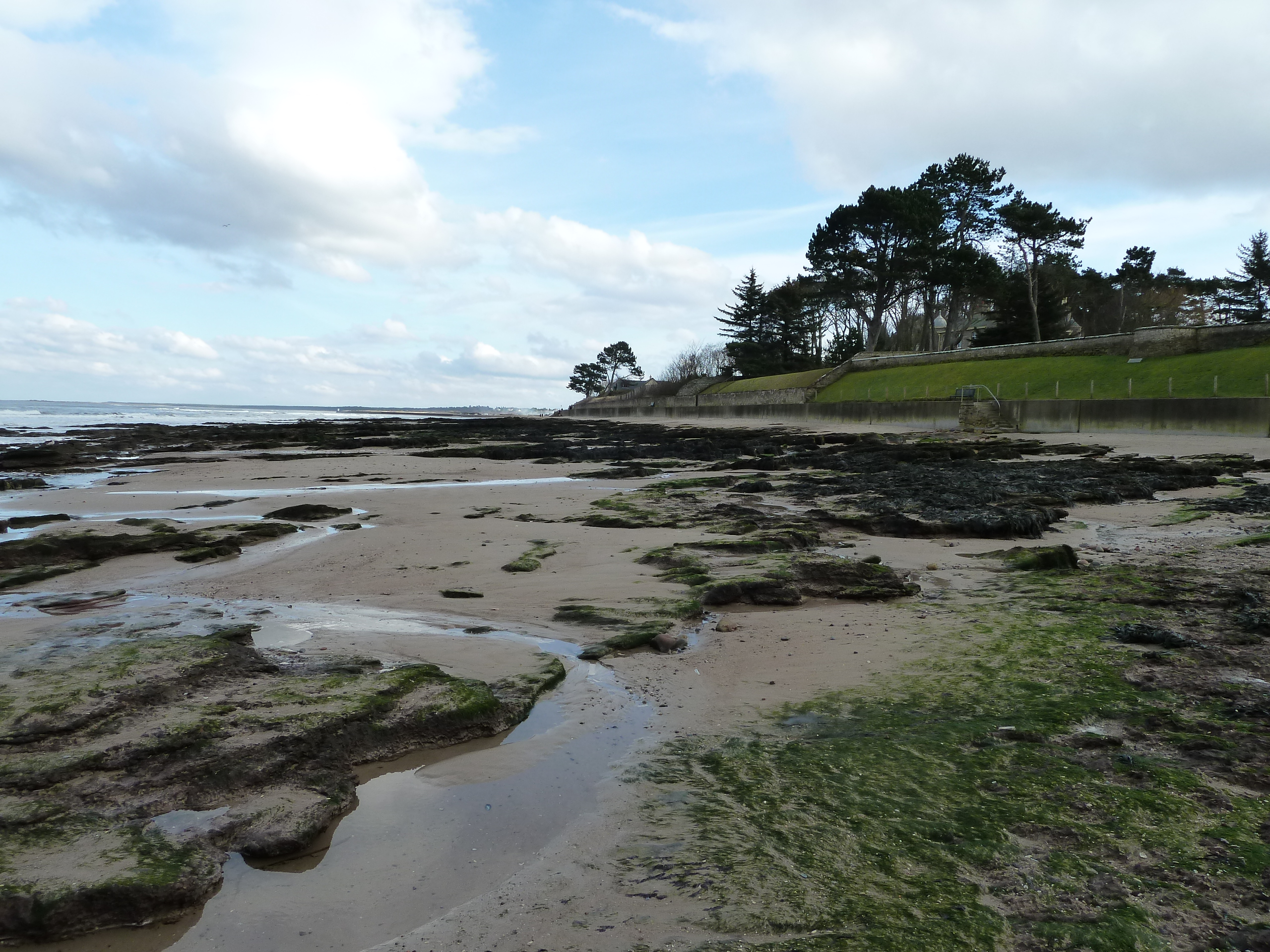
Nairn Far West Beach

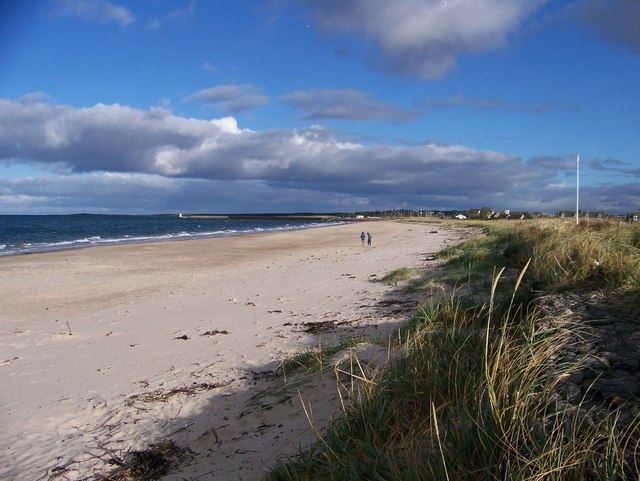
Nairn West Beach near the mouth of the river.

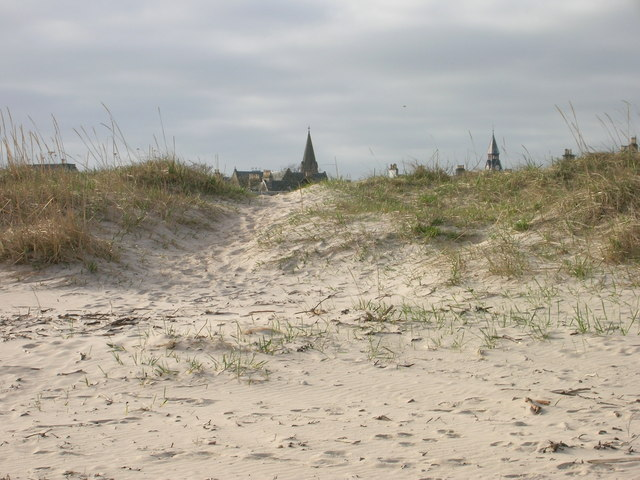
Looking south towards Nairn town from The West Beach.

Nairn is predominantly surrounded gently rolling mounds and hills of mixed-used agricultural and forestry usage upon a glacial landscape. The surrounding areas reach a height of 620 feet (189 metres) at the Hill of Urchany 3 3/4 miles (6 kilometres) south of the town. The land remains fertile and primarily consists of granite below. The hydrology of the surrounding area directs water to drain northwards into the River Nairn, leaving it prone to flooding. As such the embankments are strengthened in inhabited areas.

Landscape surrounding Nairn
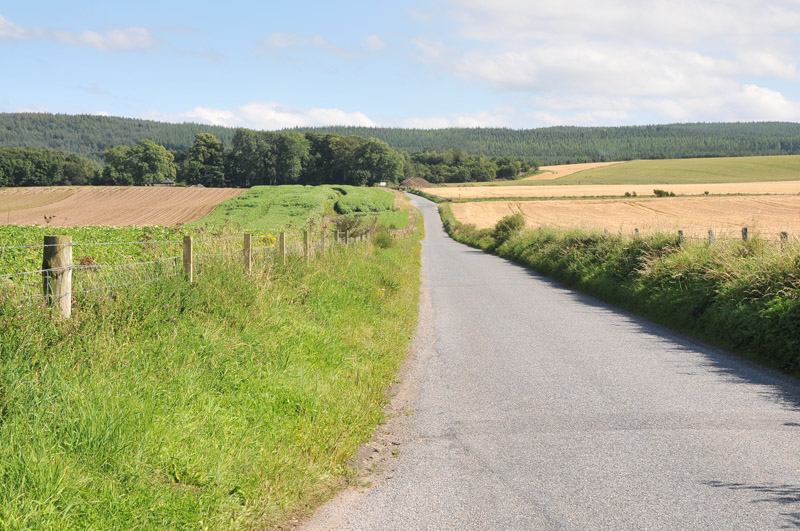
Minor roads

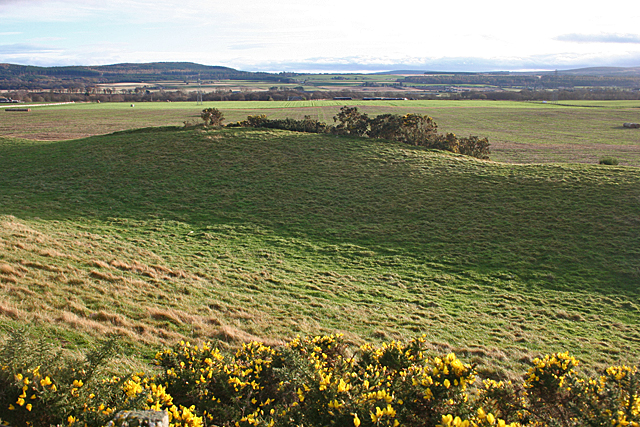
Glacial Landscape

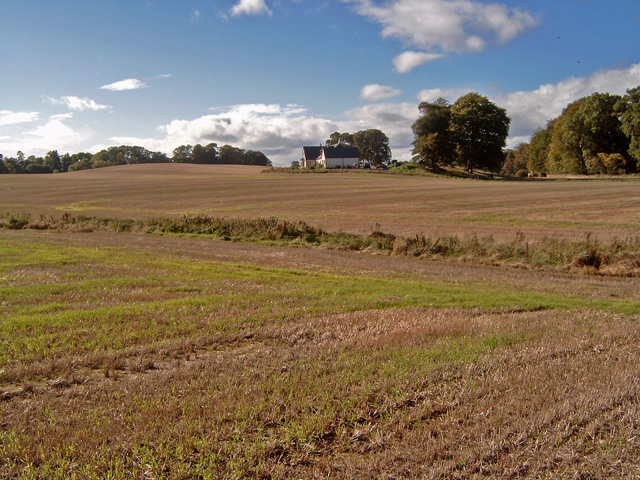
Surrounding farm lands.

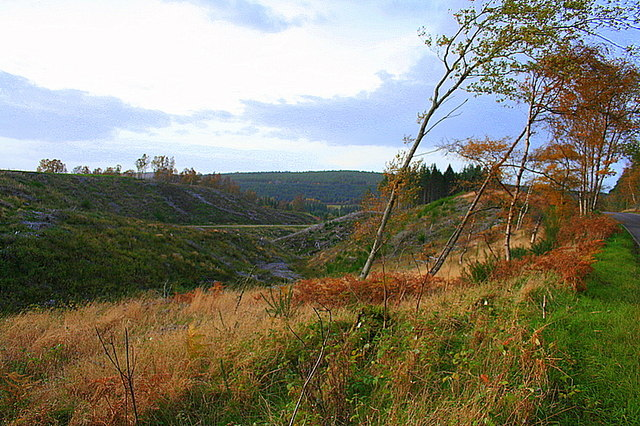
Valley landscapes

== Climate ==
 Like the rest of the British Isles being on a middle latitude, Nairn experiences a maritime climate, specifically a marine west coast climate. Western sea breezes ease temperatures and moderate the winter. Despite having no dry seasons with cool summers and mild winters it is one of the driest locations in Scotland due to the rain shadowing effect of the surrounding mountains. Comparatively Scotland in the lowlands is generally an oceanic climate, while in the mountains and in parts of the Shetland, the climate can be classed as subpolar oceanic.

Nairn 1991–2020

Climate chart (precipitation, max. and min. temperature)
J	F	M	A	M	J	J	A	S	O	N	D
52 7 1	46 8 1	42 9 2	42 12 4	50 15 6	59 17 9	60 19 11	66 19 11	61 16 9	69 13 6	56 10 3	61 7 1
- █ Average max. and min. temperatures in °C
- █ Precipitation totals in mm
- Source: Starlings Roost Weather
Imperial conversion
J	F	M	A	M	J	J	A	S	O	N	D
2.1 45 34	1.8 46 34	1.6 48 36	1.6 54 39	2 59 43	2.3 63 48	2.4 66 52	2.6 66 52	2.4 61 48	2.7 55 43	2.2 50 37	2.4 45 34
- █ Average max. and min. temperatures in °F
- █ Precipitation totals in inches

Scotland 1991–2020

Climate chart (precipitation, max. and min. temperature)
J	F	M	A	M	J	J	A	S	O	N	D
178 6 0	141 6 0	125 8 1	93 10 3	89 13 5	93 16 8	104 17 10	120 17 10	123 15 8	168 11 5	165 8 2	174 6 0
- █ Average max. and min. temperatures in °C
- █ Precipitation totals in mm
- Source: Met Office
Imperial conversion
J	F	M	A	M	J	J	A	S	O	N	D
7 42 33	5.5 43 32	4.9 46 34	3.7 51 37	3.5 56 41	3.7 60 46	4.1 63 49	4.7 63 49	4.9 59 46	6.6 52 41	6.5 46 36	6.9 42 33
- █ Average max. and min. temperatures in °F
- █ Precipitation totals in inches

Climate data for Nairn (1991–2020 averages, extremes 1931–2014)
Month	Jan	Feb	Mar	Apr	May	Jun	Jul	Aug	Sep	Oct	Nov	Dec	Year
Record high °C (°F)	15.0 (59.0)	16.7 (62.1)	21.5 (70.7)	23.4 (74.1)	27.8 (82.0)	29.4 (84.9)	29.2 (84.6)	30.6 (87.1)	26.8 (80.2)	24.4 (75.9)	20.0 (68.0)	16.1 (61.0)	30.6 (87.1)
Mean daily maximum °C (°F)	6.9 (44.4)	7.6 (45.7)	9.4 (48.9)	11.9 (53.4)	14.5 (58.1)	16.7 (62.1)	18.9 (66.0)	18.6 (65.5)	16.3 (61.3)	13.0 (55.4)	9.5 (49.1)	7.2 (45.0)	12.5 (54.6)
Mean daily minimum °C (°F)	1.0 (33.8)	0.9 (33.6)	2.2 (36.0)	3.7 (38.7)	5.9 (42.6)	8.9 (48.0)	10.8 (51.4)	10.6 (51.1)	8.7 (47.7)	5.8 (42.4)	2.9 (37.2)	0.9 (33.6)	5.2 (41.3)
Record low °C (°F)	−15.3 (4.5)	−16.7 (1.9)	−12.2 (10.0)	−8.0 (17.6)	−3.4 (25.9)	−2.2 (28.0)	2.0 (35.6)	−0.6 (30.9)	−1.9 (28.6)	−5.6 (21.9)	−12.8 (9.0)	−15.1 (4.8)	−16.7 (1.9)
Average precipitation mm (inches)	52.1 (2.05)	45.5 (1.79)	41.6 (1.64)	41.8 (1.65)	49.7 (1.96)	59.1 (2.33)	60.0 (2.36)	65.9 (2.59)	60.7 (2.39)	68.9 (2.71)	56.4 (2.22)	61.3 (2.41)	663 (26.1)
Mean monthly sunshine hours	51.4	76.6	111.2	146.1	190.8	151.3	150.0	147.4	118.4	87.6	59.0	37.0	1,326.8
Source 1: Starlings Roost Weather
Source 2: Starlings Roost Weather

== Population ==
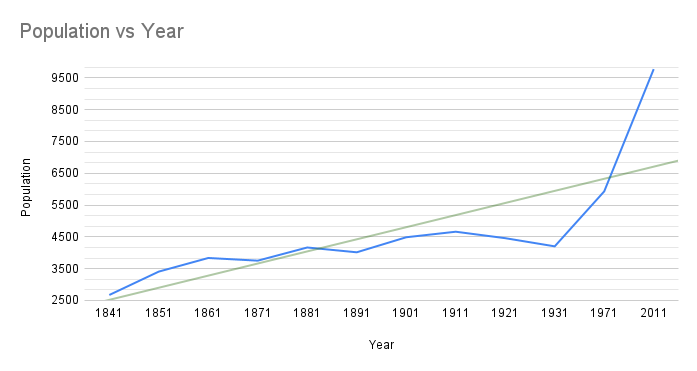
Nairn Population Chart

Population of the Burgh of Nairn
Census year	Population
1841	2,672
1851	3,407
1861	3,835
1871	3,751
1881	4,165
1891	4,014
1901	4,487
1911	4,661
1921	4,458
1931	4,201
1971	5,929
2011	9,773
2022	9,582

== Culture ==
On 27 May 1960 Nairn's The Regal Ballroom on Leopold Street played host to an act that became a huge cultural influence on the world of music. A cover band touring Scotland on The Beat Ballad Show Tour with Johnny Gentle as the lead vocalists and featuring three relatively unknown musicians—the founding members of The Beatles. John Lennon, Paul McCartney and George Harrison, who played under the name The Silver Beetles. The cover act's set list included Raining in My Heart by Buddy Holly and I Need Your Love Tonight by Elvis Presley. The Ballerina Ballroom of Nairn hosted many famous acts over the years, including Pink Floyd and The Who in 1967, Status Quo in 1970, and Fleetwood Mac and Slade in 1971. The town continues to host the Nairn International Jazz Festival each August, usually attracting some well-known musicians, including Bob Wilber and the Soprano Summit Jazz supergroup.

One link to Nairn's agricultural cultural roots is the Nairn Farmer's Show, hosted by the Nairnshire Farming Society since 1798. The show features livestock competitions of cattle, sheep and horses with trade stands as well as craft and food fairs. Locals produce baked goods, honey, jams and handicrafts such as knitting to be pitted against each other in contest..

Many of the people of Nairn have a passion for cooking and this is shown in the three-day Taste of Nairn food and drink festival event hosting the World Tattie Scone Championship.

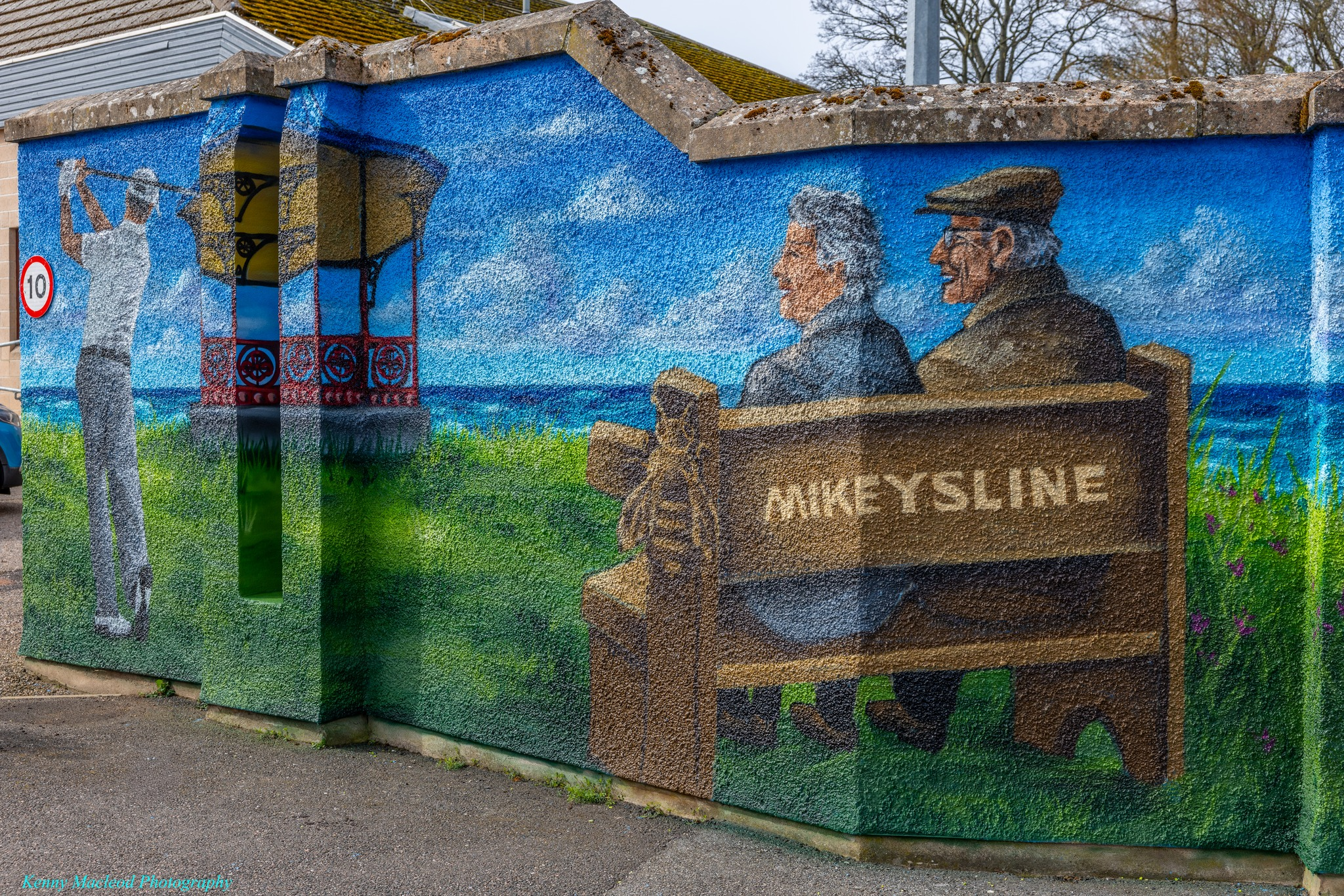
A mural painted at Nairn Bus Station.

Nairn is home to the Little Theatre, run by the Nairn Drama Club, which was established in 1946. Each year the club produces a number of shows of varying genres, with the annual Christmas panto the largest production of all. The Theatre began in dilapidated premises but was rebuilt and reopened in 2004. In 2007 Oscar-winning actress Tilda Swinton, who lives in Nairn, created a film festival entitled "Ballerina Ballroom Cinema of Dreams", which was held in the Nairn Public Hall. It generated worldwide press about the festival and Nairn.

The people of Nairn also appreciate the written arts and host for the annual Nairn Book & Arts festival in September at the Nairn Community & Arts Centre. Guests have included authors such as Helen Sedgwick, journalist John Sergeant and royal guest Camilla, Duchess of Cornwall. The events have included speakers, performers, cinema and readings of local poet Olive Fraser.

== Education ==
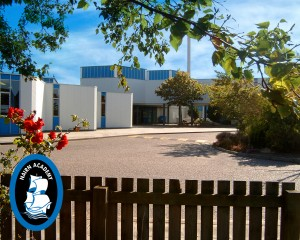
Nairn Academy

Nairn is serviced by one secondary school, Nairn Academy, on Duncan Drive in the Tradespark area, where it has been since 1976. Before that it was in the building occupied by the current Rosebank Primary school on Lodgehill Road. Nairn Academy was founded in 1832 under the name Rose's Academical Institution by Captain James Rose. Other facilities formerly existed, including Delnies School (1875-1985), the boys' preparatory boarding school known as Seaforth in 1901 and Alton Burn in 1911. As well as Rosebank Primary school, Nairn is also the location of Millbank Primary school on Millbank Crescent. Nairn Academy also takes students from Cawdor, Croy and Auldearn Primary Schools.

In 1818 we are offered insight into the status of the school facilities by the parish minister.

The parochial school is by no means fit for the education of one half of the children of the parish; and the situation of it is such, that the health of both teacher and children, is very much endangered.

— Grant, James, Parochial Returns Made to the Select Committee Appointed to Inquire into the Education of The Poor (National Library of Scotland) (1818)

In 2021 Nairn Academy ranked 204th out of 340 schools based on the percentage of pupils attaining five Highers, at 35%—higher than nearby Inverness High School with 13% and below Inverness Royal Academy with 41% and Charleston Academy Highland with 45%.

== Politics ==
Current elected officials
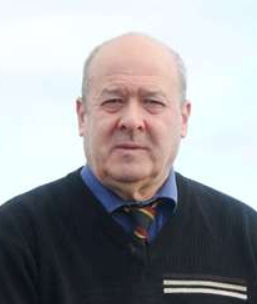
Provost Laurie Fraser

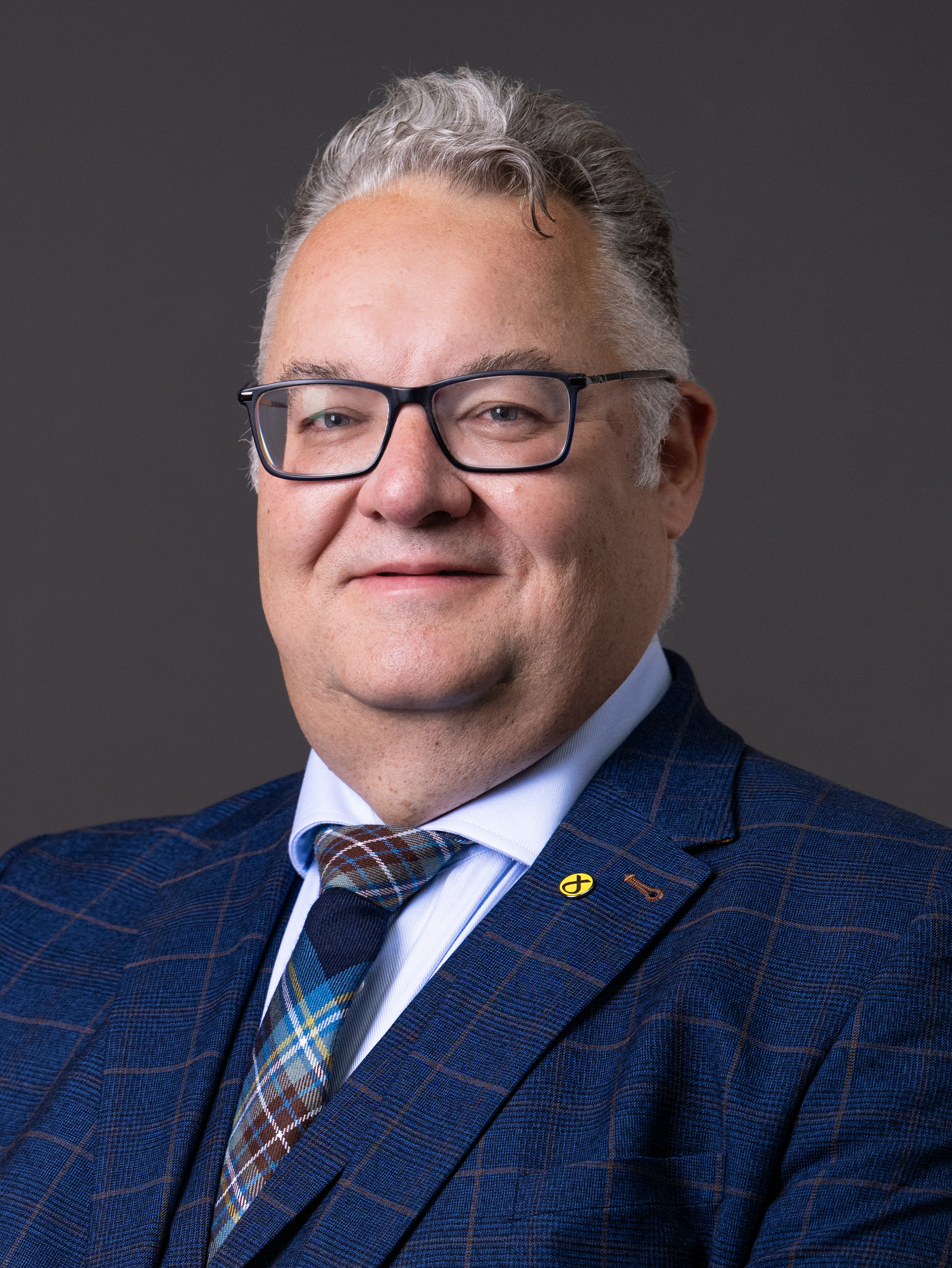
Graham Leadbitter MP

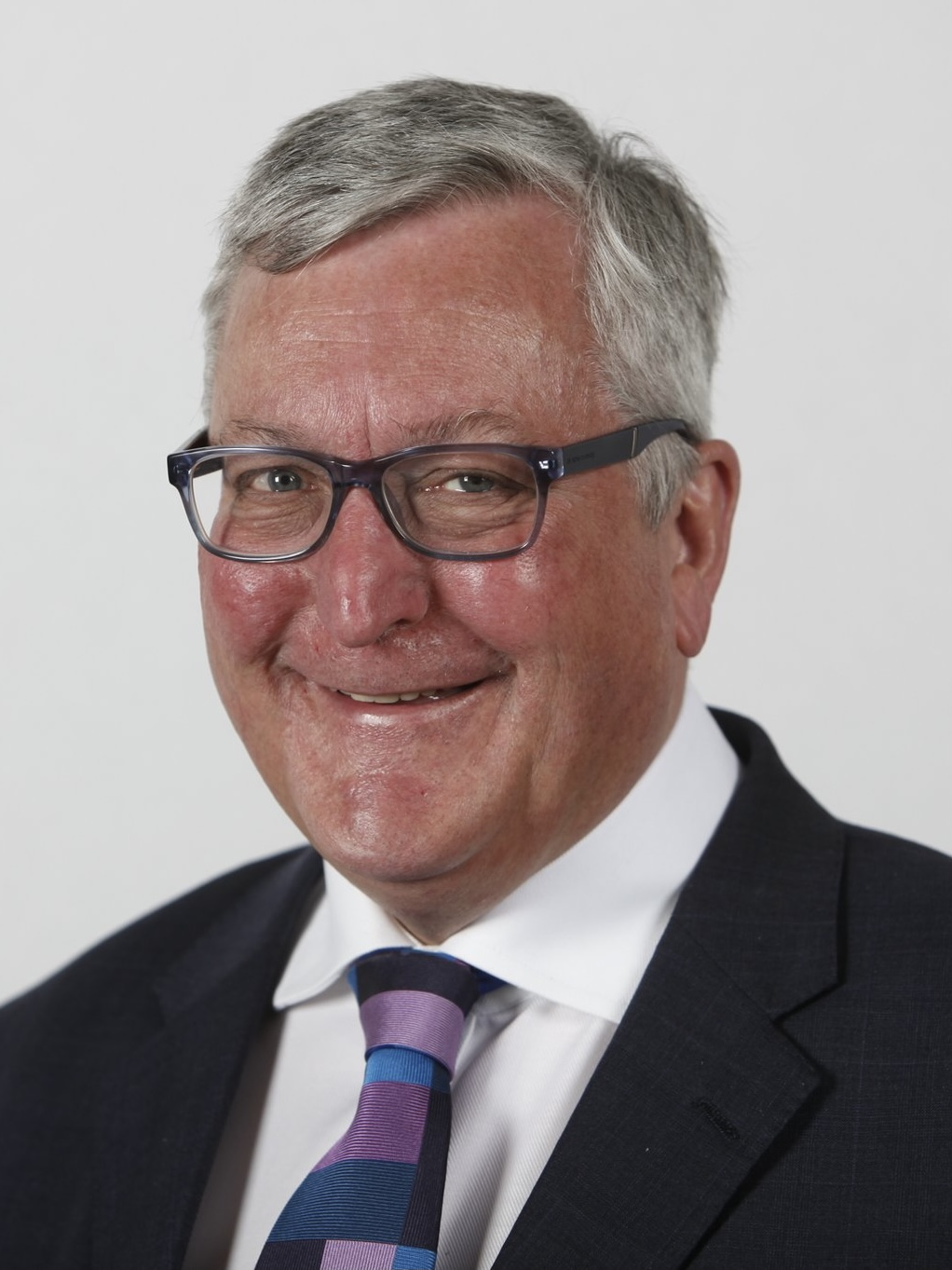
Fergus Ewing MSP

=== Local government ===
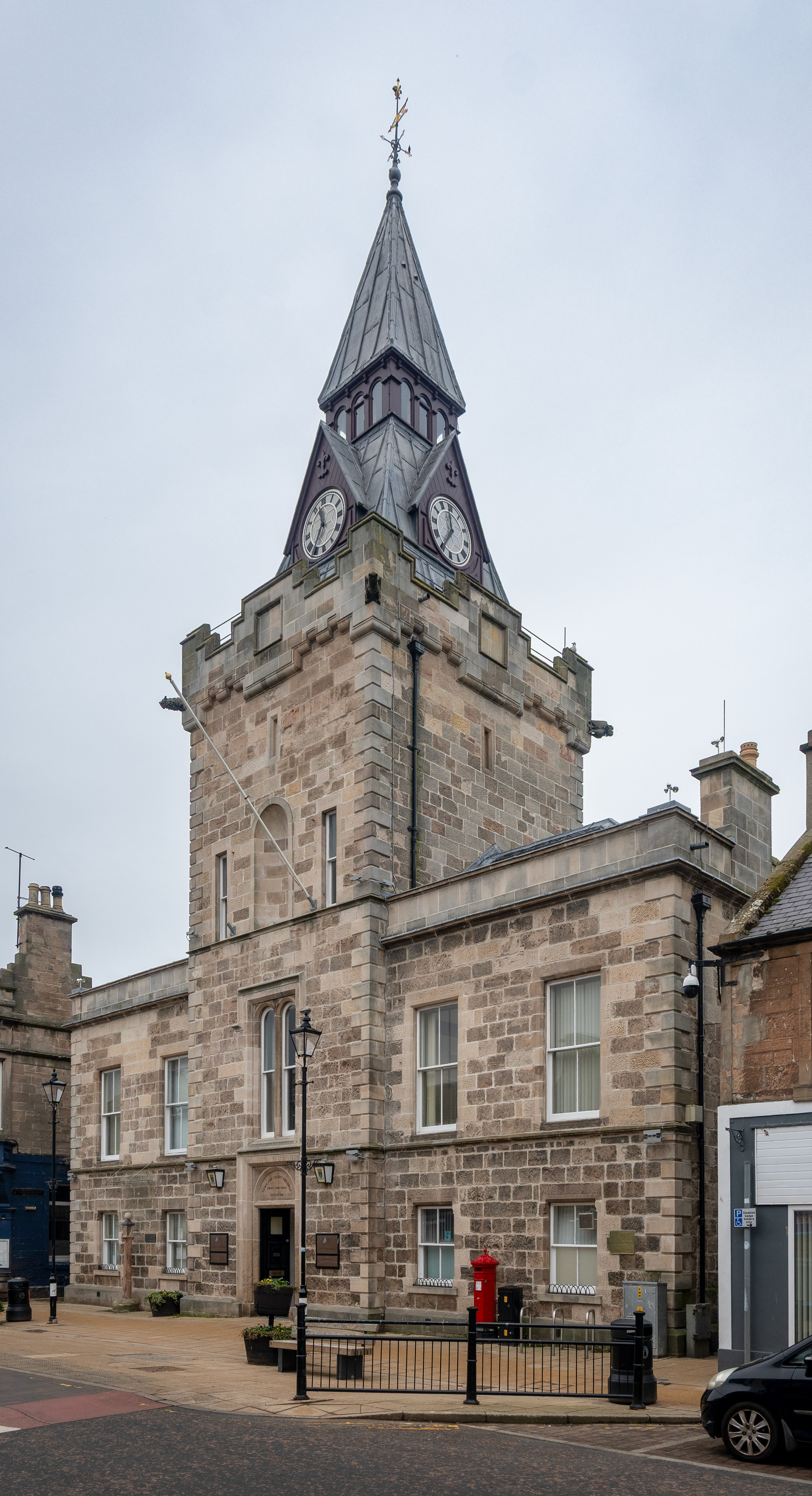
Nairn Town and County Buildings: Built 1818 as courthouse for Nairnshire and meeting place for both the county's commissioners of supply and the town council of the burgh of Nairn

Nairn is part of ward 18, Nairn & Cawdor, of the Highland Council area. The head of this burgh or ward council is a provost, the chief magistrate or convener of a burgh, the equivalent of a mayor in other parts of the United Kingdom. The provost of Nairn is Laurie Fraser.

Formed in 1973 the community council is the lowest tier of local government in Scotland. Nairn District Council, was replaced by a larger authority, Highland Council in 1996 and community councils were formed to represent local interests. Nairn is represented by two local community councils. The Nairn West & Suburban Community Council and the Nairn River Community Council.

=== Member of UK Parliament (MP) ===
In 1617 Nairn selected John Dunbar of Moynes as the Member of Parliament in the Parliament of Scotland for the constituency Nairnshire. This constituency was last represented by John Forbes of Culloden in 1707.

In 1708 following the Acts of Union 1707, Parliament of Scotland constituency Nairnshire was replaced by a district of burghs constituency of the House of Commons of the Parliament of Great Britain to 1801 and of the Parliament of the United Kingdom. From 1708 to 1918 Nairn was part of the county constituency of Inverness-shire.

The constituency was abolished in 1918 and the Forres and Nairn components were merged into the then new constituency of Moray and Nairn. Moray and Nairn was a county constituency of the House of Commons of the Parliament of the United Kingdom from 1918 to 1983. This was split for the 1983 general election and incorporated into Moray and Inverness, Nairn and Lochaber.

Inverness, Nairn and Lochaber was a county constituency of the House of Commons of the Parliament of the United Kingdom from 1983 to 1997. Inverness East, Nairn and Lochaber, was a county constituency of the House of Commons of the Parliament of the United Kingdom from 1997 to 2005 represented by Labour's David Stewart.

Nairn was part of the constituency of Inverness, Nairn, Badenoch and Strathspey from 2005 to 2024, represented first by Danny Alexander (Lib Dem) and then Drew Hendry (SNP).

Nairn is currently residing in the Moray West, Nairn and Strathspey constituency of the House of Commons of the UK Parliament. Nairn has been represented by SNP MP Graham Leadbitter in the House of Commons since 4 July 2024.

=== Member of Scottish Parliament (MSP) ===
Founded under the Scotland Act 1998, a devolved Scottish Parliament was legalised placing Nairn into the Scottish Parliament in 1999 as part of the Highland council area and constituency Inverness East, Nairn and Lochaber. Fergus Ewing of the Scottish National Party was elected to represent Nairn in the 1999 Scottish Parliament election as the first Member of the Scottish Parliament (MSP).

Boundaries were redrawn before the 2011 Scottish Parliament election, dividing the area between Inverness and Nairn and Skye, Lochaber and Badenoch. Fergus Ewing was once again elected in the 2011 election and continues to serve.

== Religion ==
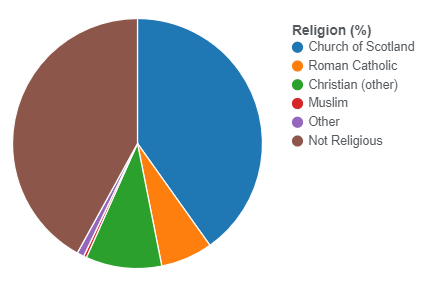
Chart of the result from the 2011 Scottish census in Nairn indicating percentage of religion.

During the 2011 census, the majority of responses from Nairn indicated a religious association, with the largest group belonging to the Church of Scotland, although this group was smaller than those who indicated that they followed no religion.

Religion	Members
Church of Scotland	3,625
Roman Catholic	607
Christian (other)	887
Muslims	35
Other religion	82
No religion	3,791

=== Christianity ===
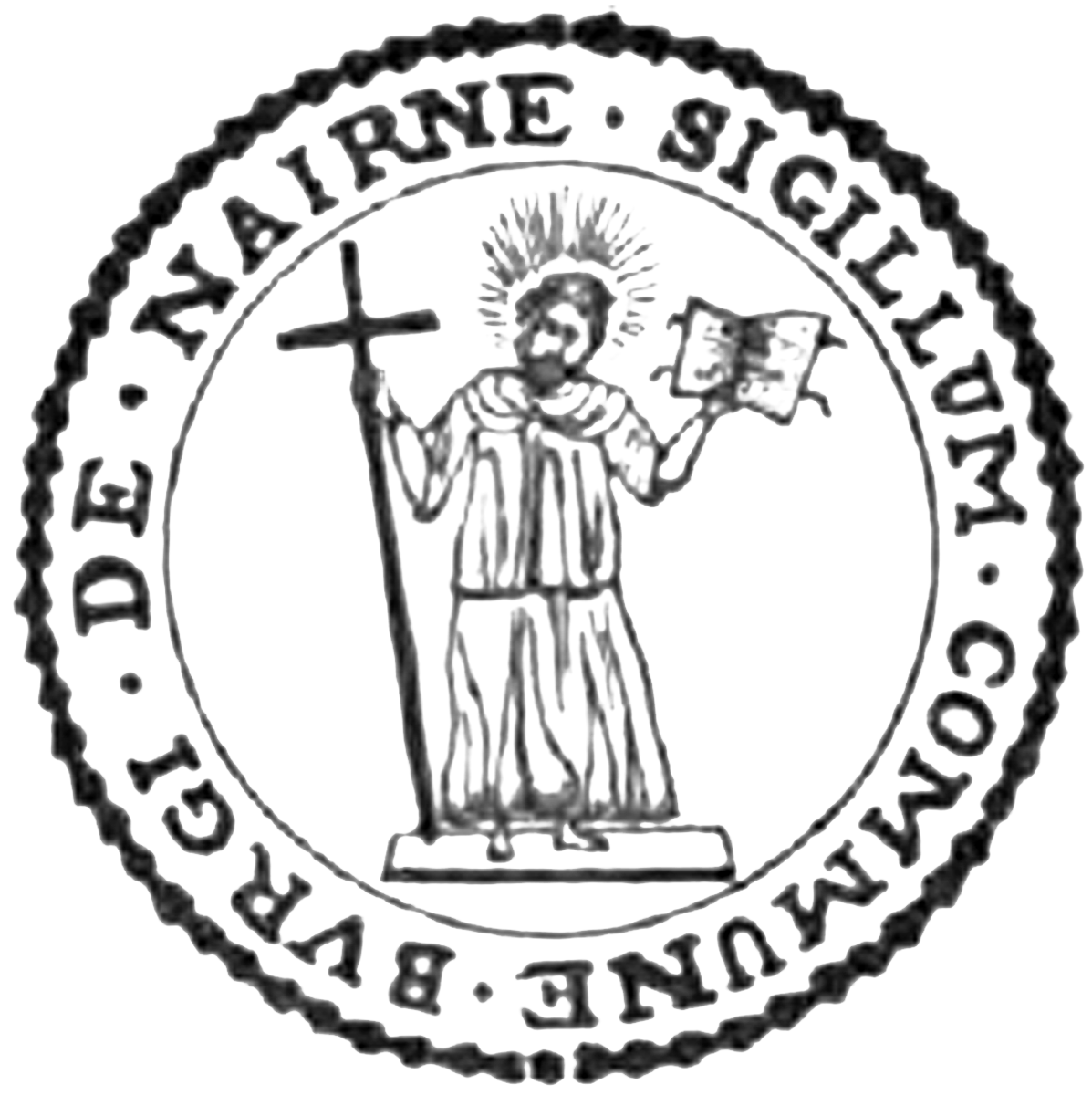
Seal of the Burgh of Nairn, depicting Saint Ninian (from a 1906 book)

Historically, Nairn was included within the diocese of Moray, believed to have been formed in the reign of Alexander I of Scotland around 1122, which extended from the River Spey to the River Beauly. A writ in the time of William the Lion shows that the Bishop of Nairn had given possession of lands in Nairn to King William for the building of Nairn Castle, implying that much of the land of Nairn and the castle had previously belonged to the church or to the bishop himself. Possession of Auldearn was provided in compensation.

There is one Church of Scotland congregation in the town called Nairnshire Parish Church. The church is in Academy Street, and was built in the late 19th century. It is a listed building.

A second Church Of Scotland building is in the High Street and was called Nairn St Ninian's. It opened in 1881, but has now united with the other parish church and is closed, awaiting sale.

St Columba's Episcopal Church is in Queen Street; it was built of sandstone with a slate roof in 1857 and is still in use. There is also St. Mary's Roman Catholic Church in Academy Street.

Nairn United Reformed Church at the fishertown was founded in 1798 by fishing people and farmers. It was called the Congregational church, but is now part of the UK wide United Reformed Church, which is Presbyterian and Congregational in its polity. It has a significant presence in the community, where it is heavily involved in social projects to help others

Other worshipping communities include Nairn Baptist Church meeting at the community centre Nairn Free Church on Gordon Street, and The Pentecostal Church of God.

=== Islam ===
Islamic practice in the Highlands dates from before World War II, with nine Muslim graves for the fallen veterans in Kingussie. Lady Zainab, also known as Lady Evelyn Cobbold and Zainab Cobbold, is a local figure of note and daughter of the 7th Earl of Dunmore. Born in 1867, she is the first known British woman to complete the Hajj pilgrimage to Mecca in 1932, and continued to practice her faith until her death in Inverness in 1963. She was buried in Glencarron in 1963 and in accordance with the principles of Islam.

The number of Muslims noted in the 2011 Census of Scotland reflects the lack of mosques in Nairn. The nearest mosque is Inverness Mosque, 16 miles (26 kilometres) west, and the next is Elgin Mosque, 21 miles (34 kilometres) east. In the north of Scotland prayers times can start as early as 02:00 for Fajr and 11:00 for Isha.

=== Paganism ===
Paganism, Wicca, or Witchcraft has a long history in Scotland and in Nairn. In nearby Elgin, east of the cathedral is the Order Pot, a deep pool of water used to test the witches of Nairn up to 1560. Over fifty people were tried and killed within two miles (three kilometres) of Nairn, including Issobel Nicoll, Margaret Wilsone and Allexander Ledy in the 16th and 17th centuries as witches and warlocks.

In 1662 a woman living in Auldearn, two miles (three kilometres) from Nairn, Isobel Gowdie, was accused and confessed to four counts of Witchcraft and is immortalised in The Confession of Isobel Gowdie, an orchestra piece by composer James MacMillan.

Practices continued into 1848, as a corps creagh was discovered on the bank of the River Nairn near the town—a life-sized clay figure filled with needles placed in such a way that water dipped over its heart. It was said that when the clay dissolved, the man the clay represented would die.

Witches and warlocks were as plentiful a crop in Moray and Nairn as in other parts of Scotland.

— Rampini, Charles, 'The County Histories of Scotland, Moray and Nairn (1898)'

Modern pagans have formed online groups such as the Scottish Pagan Federation, Highland Pagan Open Circle and East Scotland Heathen Moot, whose members include Nairnshire residents.

==== List of accused witches and warlocks of Nairn ====
- Jonet Braidheid
- Issobell Gowdie
- Agnes McGillivorich
- Agnes Nic Ean Vane
- Margaret Wilsone
- Bessie Wilson
- Bessie Friece
- Issobel Friece
- Elspeth Makhomie
- Mariorie Man
- Archibald Man
- Bessie Hay
- Mariorie Taylor
- Elspet Nishie
- Elspeth Makbeith
- Janet Burnet
- Barbara Friece
- Margaret Brodie
- Agnes Grant
- Walter Ledy
- Margaret Hucheons
- Bessie Hutcheons
- Elspet Falconer
- Bessie Young
- Issobel Nicoll

== Sports and athletics ==
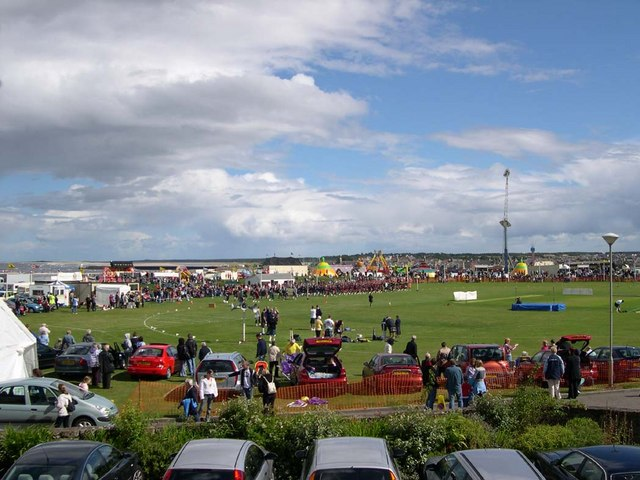
Nairn Highland Games

Nairn has a wide range of sporting clubs and activities. The main Nairn Sports Club, on Viewfield Drive, offers facilities for weight and cardio training, tennis, squash, table tennis and badminton, among other sports. It offers classes in spinning, pilates and yoga, among others. On the coast the Nairn Leisure Centre holds Nairn's only swimming pool as well as indoor and outdoor fitness suites. Nairn hosts the only Synchronised Swimming (Artistic Swimming) club in the north of Scotland.

Most notable of the sporting activities of Nairn is the Nairn Highland Games, a yearly event taking place since 1867. It attracts large crowds of tourists and locals. Events include the more modern half-marathon and traditional Highland games events, the tug-of-war, shot put, highland dancing and tossing the caber. These are the only completely free entry games in Scotland.

Another major entry in the Nairn calendar is the Nairn 10k race. Starting in Nairn High Street and ending there below the clock tower, the course leaves the boundaries of the town and takes runners into rural Nairnshire via its roads. The event also hosts a fun run which is untimed and can be entered by children as young as nine. The event is hosted by the Nairn Road Runners, another of Nairn's athletics clubs. They practice cross country, road running, hill running and ultra distance races. So they can compete themselves, the event is often staffed by ex-members and volunteers.

The oldest recorded sporting club of Nairn is the Nairn Curling Club, established before 1854 as members of the Royal Caledonian Curling Club, The club still has a complete members' list from 1907 to 2007.

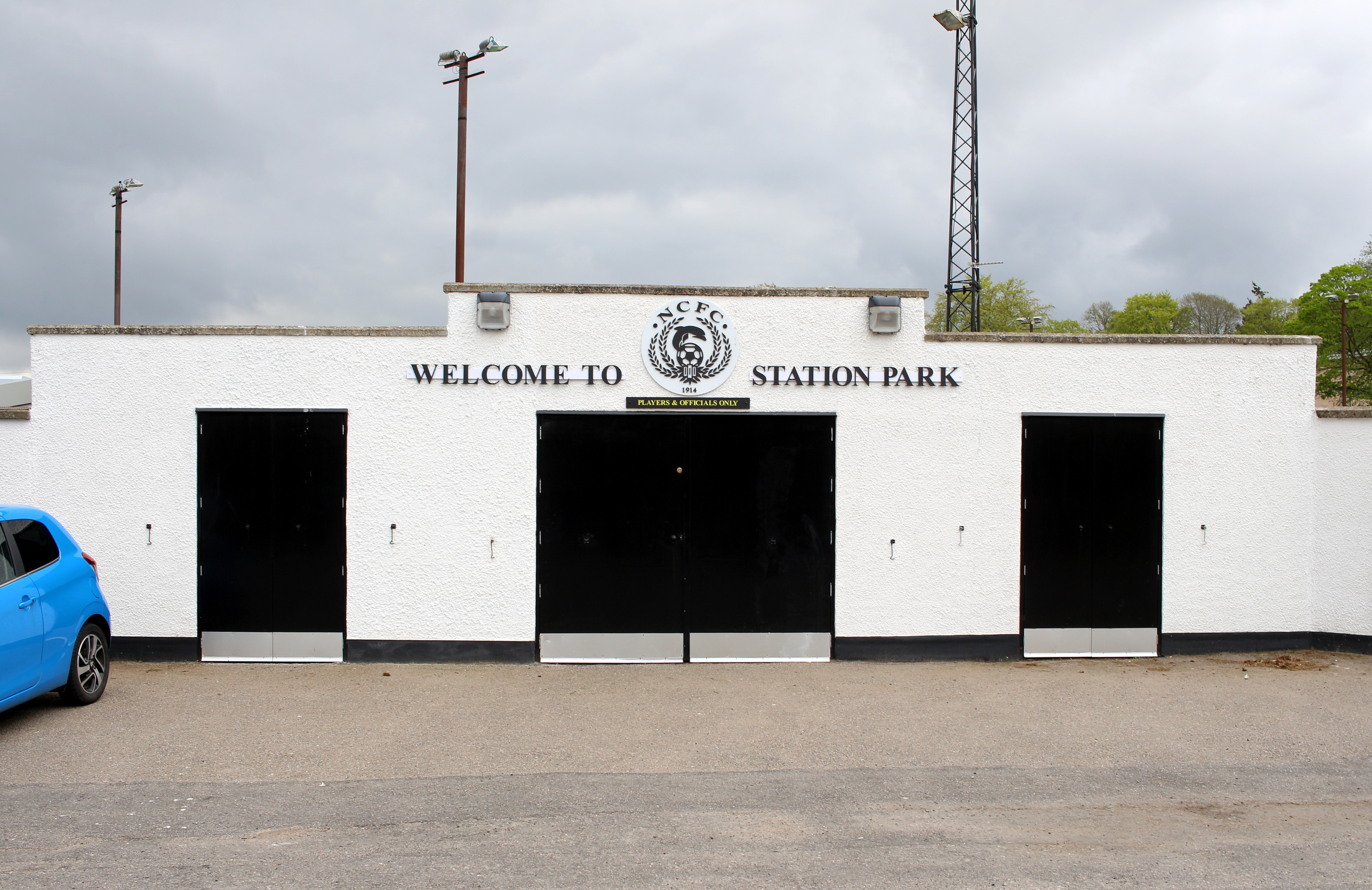
Station Park, Nairn FC

Nairn has three local football teams. Nairn County of Station Park on Balblair Road play in the Highland Football League established in 1914 and Nairn St. Ninian, who are members of the Scottish Junior Football Association, are based at Showfield Park. The Nairn St Ninian Women's team, established in 2016, play in the Scottish Women's Football league.

The Nairn County Cricket Club have been members of the North of Scotland Cricket Association since it was founded in 1893. The club plays and hosts at the pavilion in Nairn links and holds a yearly Kwik Cricket Competition for all the schools in the Nairn area with an aim for junior development and encouragement of young people joining the sport.

Nairn is known as a golfing destination, with two 18-hole Championship golf courses. One of these, The Nairn Golf Club, was established in 1887. Its designers include Archie Simpson, Old Tom Morris and James Braid. It has hosted many tournaments culminating in the 1999 Walker Cup and was the venue for the 2012 Curtis Cup. The second is Nairn Dunbar Golf Club, established in 1899 and host of the World One-Arm Golfers Championship, British Seniors Amateur Championship and The 91st Boys Amateur Championship.

Nairn is home to the Nairn St Ninian Bowling club on Viewfield Drive, established in 1961, and Bowls Scotland Silver Mark accredited club, on Albert Street.

Being on the coast Nairn enjoys easy access to the North Sea and has had a sailing club since 1968. It has a membership clubhouse at Nairn harbour. Nairn Coastal Rowing Club, organised under The Scottish Coastal Rowing Association, was established in 2017 and merged with the Ardersier Boat Club in November 2018. It hosts two 22 ft (6.5m) long by 5 ft 8in (1.7m) beam (width) boats. Another modern addition to Nairn's sporting landscape is the Nairn Boxing Club, established in 2019. It hosted professional boxer Adian Williamson in the High Street gym.

== Notable people ==
- Charlie Chaplin, used to holiday every year in Nairn and stayed at the Newton Hotel.
- Margaret Fulton, food and cookery author, writer, journalist, author, and commentator. She was the first of this genre of writers in Australia.
- James Augustus Grant, who was the first European to discover the outpouring of the White Nile from Lake Victoria, together with Speke, was born at Househill, attended Nairn Academy and died at Nairn in 1892. There is a plaque to his memory in St Paul's Cathedral.
- Frances M. Hendry, author of children's historical fiction, resides in Nairn, where many of her books are set.
- Grenville Johnston, Lord Lieutenant of Moray, born here.
- Fraser Nelson, editor of The Spectator since 2009, was raised in Nairn.
- George McCall Smith, New Zealand doctor
- Tilda Swinton, actress and her children have resided in Nairn since 2007.
- David St John Thomas, British author and publisher resided here prior to his death in 2014.
- William Whitelaw, British Deputy Prime Minister (1979–88) was born in Nairn and has a street named after his family.

== See also ==
- Nairn Town and County Hospital
- Kingsteps
- Murder of Alistair Wilson
