= Kinuachdrachd =

Coordinates: 56.125918°N 5.6949254°W

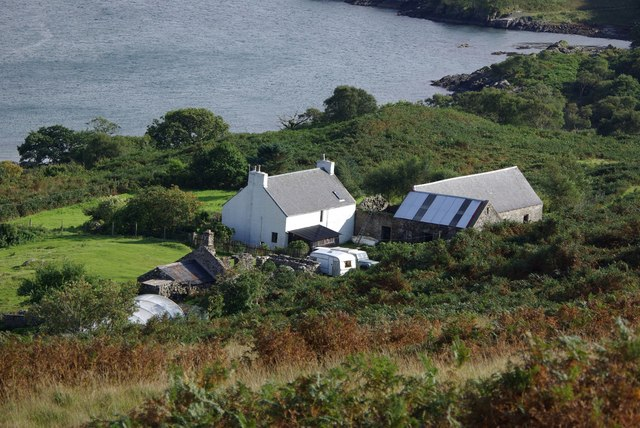

- Location within Argyll and Bute
- Civil parish: Jura
- Council area: Argyll and Bute
- Country: Scotland
- Sovereign state: United Kingdom
- Police: Scotland
- Fire: Scottish
- Ambulance: Scottish

Kinuachdrachd or Kinuachdrach is a place about 22 miles from Craighouse on the island of Jura, in the council area of Argyll and Bute, Scotland. It comprises a house west of the Aird of Kinuachdrachd. On the 1982 OS 1:10000 map there were 4 buildings.

== History ==
The name "Kinuachdrach" means "Upper end". It once served as a crossing point to Scarba and the mainland. For most of the 19th century Kinuachdrach had a relatively sizable population.
