= Killaworgey =

Coordinates: 50.411°N 4.949°W

Killaworgey: Cornish: Kilworgi
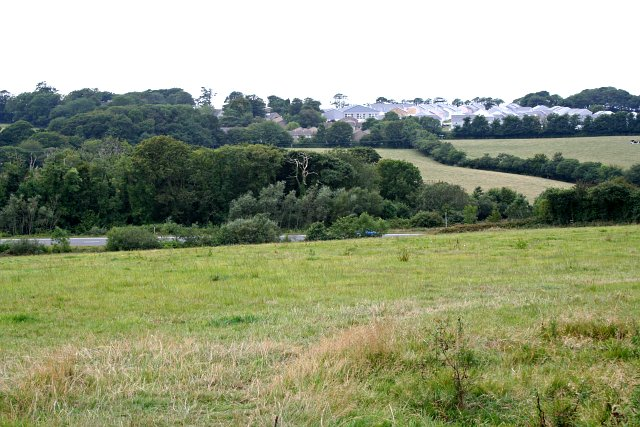
- View towards Killaworgey

- Location within Cornwall
- OS grid reference: SW906609
- Civil parish: St Columb Major
- Unitary authority: Cornwall
- Ceremonial county: Cornwall
- Region: South West
- Country: England
- Sovereign state: United Kingdom
- Post town: Newquay
- Postcode district: TR8

Killaworgey (Cornish: Kilworgi) is a hamlet near Indian Queens in Cornwall, England. It is in the civil parish of St Columb Major.
