= Kingsteps =

Hamlet in Highland, Scotland

Coordinates: 57.5918°N 3.8406°W

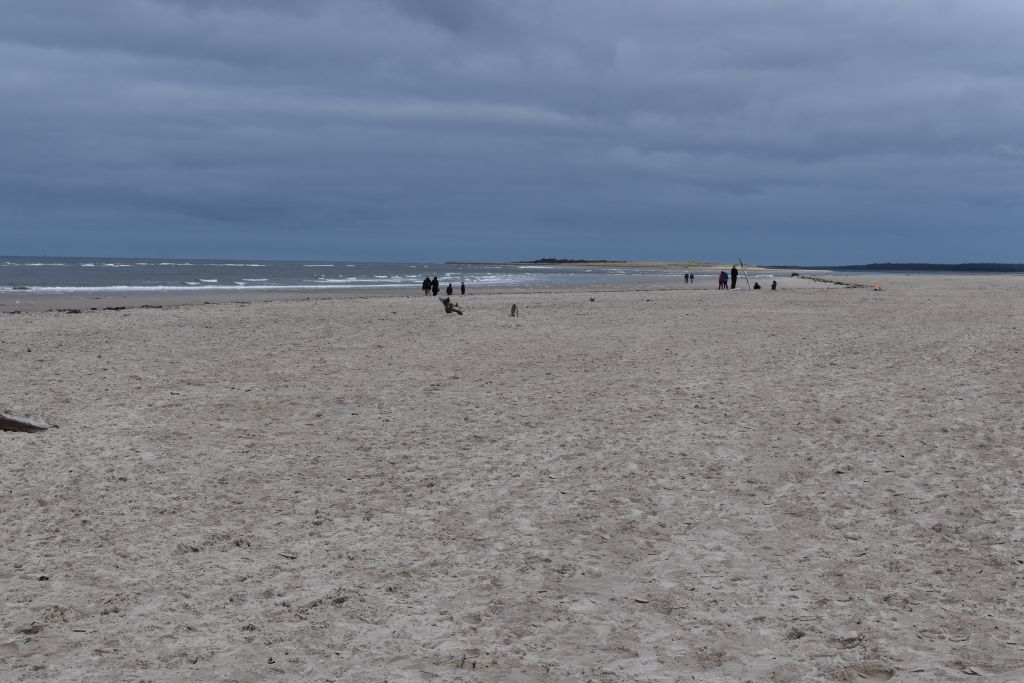
Beach at Nairn

Kingsteps is a hamlet in Nairnshire about a mile east-north-east of Nairn, UK. It faces north to a wide sandy beach at low tide.

== See also ==
- Culbin Forest – A forest in Moray, near Kingsteps.
