= St Allen =

Civil parish in Cornwall, England

Coordinates: 50.314°N 5.061°W

St Allen: Cornish: Eglosalan
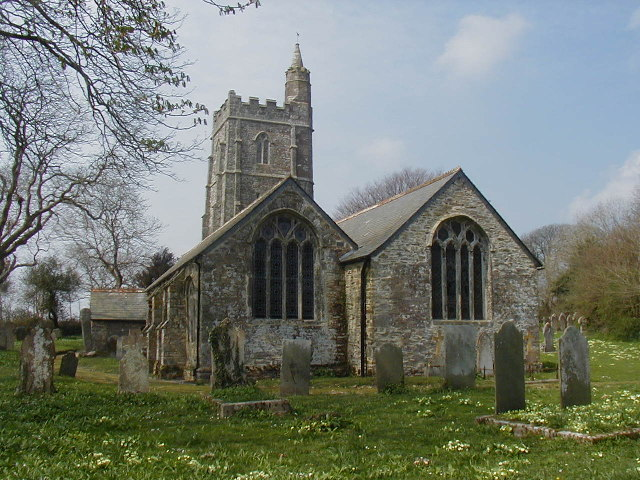
- St Allen Church

- Location within Cornwall
- Population: 456 (2011)
- OS grid reference: SW831482
- Unitary authority: Cornwall
- Ceremonial county: Cornwall
- Region: South West
- Country: England
- Sovereign state: United Kingdom
- Post town: TRURO
- Postcode district: TR4
- Police: Devon and Cornwall
- Fire: Cornwall
- Ambulance: South Western

St Allen (Cornish: Eglosalan (hamlet), Pluw Alan (parish)) is a civil parish in Cornwall, England, United Kingdom. The church town of St Allen is an isolated hamlet and the main settlement in the parish is Zelah which is situated on the A30 trunk road four miles (6.5 km) north of Truro.

The population in the 2001 census was 435 people and the parish occupies 3,506 acres (14.19 km^{2}) of land. The population had increased to 495 at the 2011 census.

== History ==
The manor of Cargoll included St Allen and it was in the possession of the bishops of Exeter from 1269 (the manor house was at Lanner). From 1287 the patrons of the living were the canons of Glasney College).

St Allen parish church was built in the Norman period but enlarged by the addition of the south aisle in the 15th century (the dedication is to St Alunus). Little is known of this saint but he has been identified with the Breton bishop Alan of Quimper who came from Wales.

The 1881 English Census indicates that John Noon Munford was the Rector and living in the Rectory with his wife and two children and two servants.

== Antiquities ==
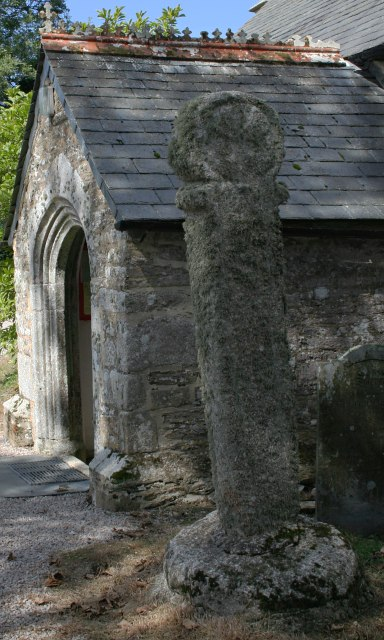
A cross in the churchyard

Arthur Langdon (1896) recorded four Cornish crosses in the parish: one at the farm of Lower Town is buried upside down in the ground; the others are defaced crosses at Tolcarn, Trefronick and Trevalsa. Andrew Langdon (1994) also recorded four crosses as well as a font adapted from a Gothic cross base. Three of these crosses are in the churchyard, of which one was removed from Trefronick Farm in 1911. Andrew Langdon (citing a 1913 paper by William J. Stephens in the Journal of the Royal Institution of Cornwall) notes that Arthur Langdon had described the same cross twice, as Trevalsa cross and Lower Town cross are the same.

== Cornish wrestling ==
Cornish wrestling tournaments, for prizes, were held in St Allen in the 1800s.
