= Zelah, Cornwall =

Village in Cornwall, England

Coordinates: 50°19′32″N 5°04′36″W

Zelah: Cornish: An Hel
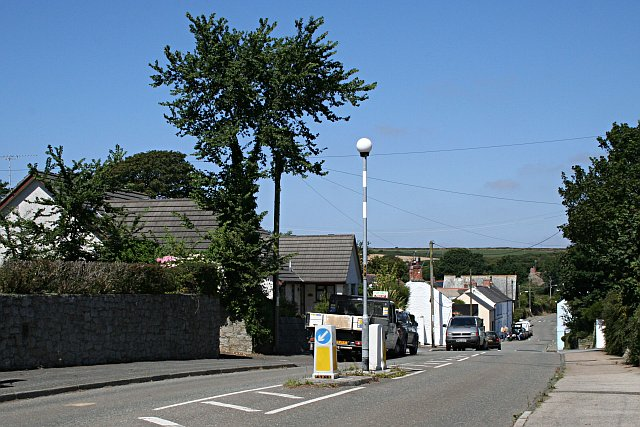
- Zelah

- Location within Cornwall
- OS grid reference: SW8151
- Shire county: Cornwall
- Region: South West
- Country: England
- Sovereign state: United Kingdom
- Post town: TRURO
- Postcode district: TR4
- Police: Devon and Cornwall
- Fire: Cornwall
- Ambulance: South Western

Zelah (Cornish: An Hel) is a village in Cornwall, England, United Kingdom, approximately 5 miles (8.0 kilometres) north of Truro. Zelah is the largest settlement in the civil parish of St Allen. The parish population in the 2001 census was 435.

== History and toponymy ==
The A30 London-Land's End road used to pass through Zelah until 1992 when a bypass was built south of the village to divert the trunk road away from the "High Road" that ran through the village. This typical ridge road runs from Carland Cross to Chiverton with barrows and burial cemeteries along its length gives some idea of the age of this old way. The public house in Zelah is an old coaching inn named The Hawkins Arms in the 19th century in honour of a descendant of the West Country seafarer Sir Richard Hawkins who gave it patronage. E. R. Kelly's Directory of Cornwall lists two public houses in the village in the 1883 edition and shows on the map both The Hawkins Arms – licensee Mr John Borlase and just behind to the east the Half-Moon Public House – licensee John Jose. This second pub stood right up to the turn of the century until it was demolished along with a wheelwrights smithy (one of three in the village at that time – the two others being blacksmiths) and a larger barn in the Hawkins car park nearby. The old pub site is now occupied by Half Moon House.(Kelly's Directory of Cornwall; 1883. London: Kelly & Co.)

The meaning of the name has been explained in various ways. One explanation is that Zelah is named after Zela or Zelah, a place in ancient Judea which was the burial place of King Saul, his father Kish and his son Jonathan. Another interpretation is that of the Rev. John Bannister (1816–1873) Vicar of St Day who wrote in his Glossary of Cornish Names in 1869 that Zelah is Ze-Alla or Ze-Lah meaning dry (seek) enclosure, (lan). However, the authoritative Cornish place names scholar O. J. Padel notes that the name occurs as Sele in 1311 and Zela in 1613 (the latter form showing the influence of West-Country English pronunciation). He has no doubt that it is Old English "sele" (hall) and corresponds to six places named "Zeal" in Devon with the same meaning and origin. The Akademi Kernewek uses a Cornish translation of this as the modern Cornish name, namely "An Hel" (the hall).

== Cornish wrestling ==
Zelah has held Cornish wrestling tournaments, for prizes, for centuries. Venues for tournaments included the Half Moon Inn and the Hawkin's Arms. Note that in May 1871 there were tournaments on consecutive days in each of these venues.
