= Jack Lake =

Jack Lake may refer to:

== People ==
- Jack Lake (footballer), an Australian rules footballer

== Places ==
- Jack Lake, Simcoe County, Ontario, community in the municipality of Clearview, Ontario
- Jack Lake (Halifax), lake in Halifax, Nova Scotia
- Jack Lake (Nipissing District), lake in Nipissing District, Ontario, within Algonquin Provincial Park
- Jack Lake (Peterborough County), lake in the Kawartha Lakes in Peterborough County, Ontario
- Jack Lake, Peterborough County, dispersed rural community, on the northwest shore of Jack Lake (Peterborough County), in Peterborough County, Ontario
