= Kasshabog Lake =

- Location in southern Ontario
- Location: Peterborough County, Ontario
- Coordinates: 44°37′53″N 77°57′53″W
- Type: Lake
- Part of: Great Lakes Basin
- Primary inflows: North River
- Primary outflows: North River
- Basin countries: Canada
- Surface area: 2,000 acres (810 ha)
- Average depth: 15 ft (4.6 m)
- Max. depth: 78 ft (24 m)
- Shore length^{1}: 47 mi (76 km)
- Surface elevation: 860.2 ft (262.2 m) (summer); 858.5 ft (261.7 m) (winter)
- ^{1} Shore length is not a well-defined measure.

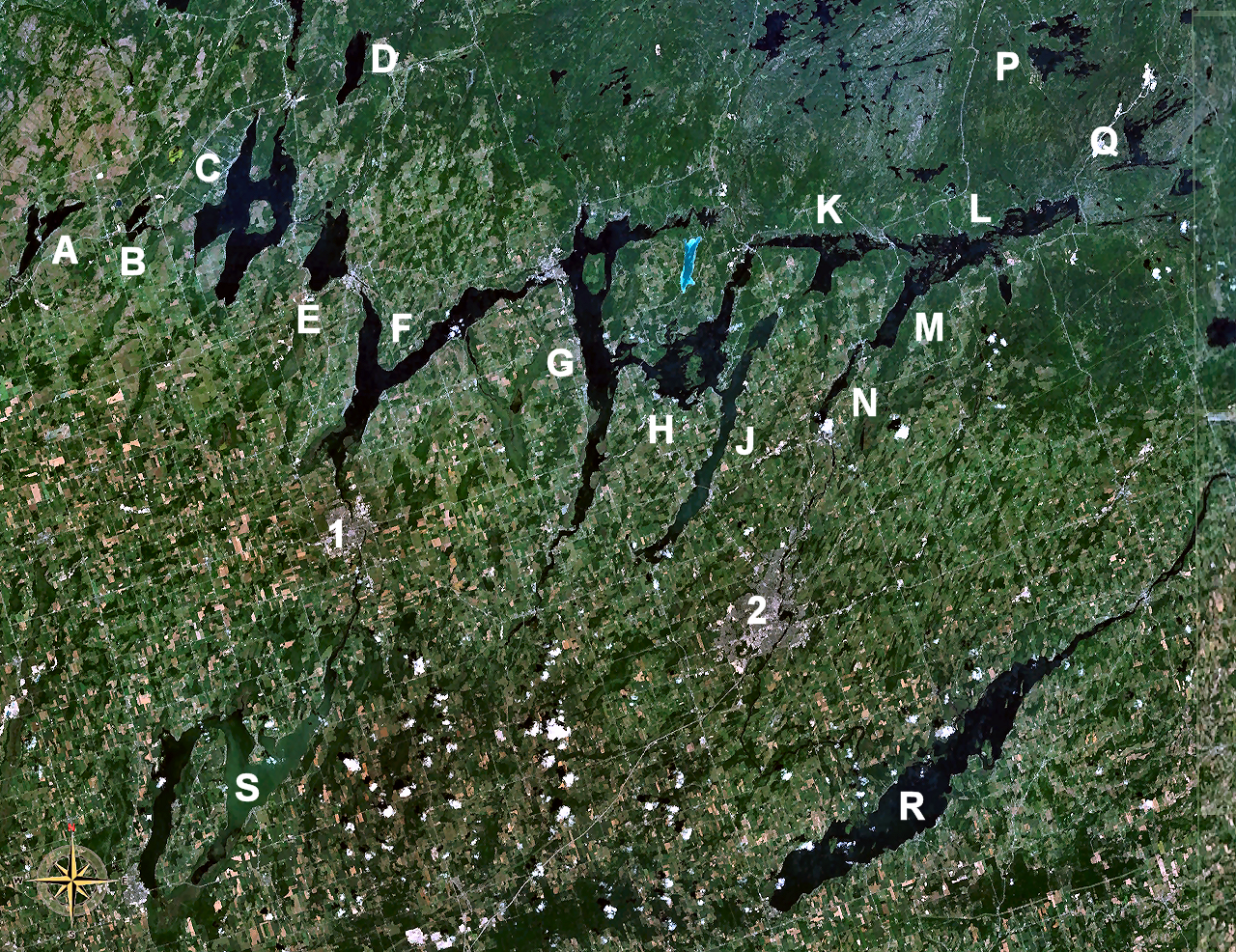
The Kawartha lakes with Kasshabog Lake

Kasshabog Lake is a small lake in Havelock-Belmont-Methuen, Peterborough County, in central Ontario, Canada. It is in the Great Lakes Basin, and is home to a cottage community, including game fishing, a marina and lodges.

== Geography ==
Kasshabog Lake is located 22 km (14 mi) north of the community of Havelock. The lake receives flow from several smaller tributary lakes. The major inflow at the north and outflow at the south is the North River, which flows to Belmont Lake, and then via the Crowe River and Trent River to Lake Ontario. Although the lake has many islands and bays, only MacDonald (Bill's) Bay appeared to be hydrologically separated from the main lake, but it is not.

As of 1978, the lake had 16 permanent residences, 504 cottages, and four cottage rental units. MacDonald Bay has 81 cottages along its shoreline. The unincorporated area and dispersed rural community of Kasshabog Lake is on the west shore.

== Hydrology ==
The volume of water in MacDonald Bay flushes itself about twice during the year, while the rest of the lake flushes only about once a year.

Kasshabog Lake has soft, slightly acidic water with a moderately low amount of apparent colour. The hardness, alkalinity, and conductivity levels indicate the lake is well mixed. Thermal stratification (temperature layers) were found in almost all the bays and monitoring stations. Water clarity was moderately good throughout the lake, and the secchi disk results indicate the lake is mesotrophic, or moderately enriched.

Dissolved oxygen distribution throughout the lake showed a gradual decline with increasing depth, probably due to the decomposition of organic matter in the bottom waters. No significant accumulations of nutrients in the bottom waters was found at any of the monitoring stations.

The density and composition of the phytoplankton (microscopic water plants) indicated an "unenriched" lake condition. The density and composition of the zooplankton (microscopic animals) indicated "moderately enriched" lake conditions.

== Sportfish ==
The most popular sportfish of Kasshabog lake are Largemouth Bass, Muskellunge, and Smallmouth Bass. The lake also contains Rock Bass, Perch, and Walleye (Pickerel). Kasshabog lake is in Fisheries Management Zone 15.

== Tornado ==
There was a tornado in the summer of 2002. There was tree damage and a few houses damaged.

== Fanwort (Cabomba caroliniana) ==
Fanwort is an aquatic perennial herbaceous plant and is considered invasive. The first verified report of an established population of fanwort in Ontario was made in the summer of 1991 in the North River, immediately downstream of Kasshabog Lake. It is the only reported established population of this plant in Canada. Fanwort is a popular aquarium plant and was likely introduced to the lake by dumping aquarium remains into the lake.

== Pollution from Unimin Ltd. on Kasshabog Lake ==
In August 2012, the Medical Officer of Health of Peterborough County issued a health advisory to the residents of Kasshabog Lake and Bottle Lake. For details see www.pcchu.ca.

In February 2013 the Ministry of the Environment released an exhaustive study on the air quality Impacts of Unimin Ltd. on Kasshabog Lake. The report concludes that: "Unimin is the source of contaminants that are being released to the atmosphere in an amount and manner that is causing the following adverse effects, contrary to the general provisions of the Environmental Protection Act, RSO 1990 (EPA), Section 14: a)impairment of the quality of the natural environment for any use that can be made of it, b) damage to property, c)harm or material discomfort to any person, d)loss of enjoyment of normal use of property. The Facility operations are the source of contaminants whose observed deposition results in violations of the limits contained in schedule 2 of Ontario Regulation 419?05 (Local Air Quality) for Dustfall. Unimin is the source of contaminants that are being released to the atmosphere in an amount and manner that is in violation of Part III, section 45 of Ontario REgulation 419/05 (Local Air Quality).".

Residents of the lake have also issued formal complaints to the mine, Ministry of the Environment and the Environmental Commissioner regarding sound emissions from the mine. Their complaints and observations contradict the findings by Pinchin Environmental for Unimin. That report concluded that "the noise impacts from both plants at the monitoring locations were below the applicable MOE guideline limites for Class 3 (Rural) areas".

Following orders from the Ministry of the Environment early in the year, Unimin mine has embarked on a plan to cover tailings areas with vegetations. As shown in aerial photographs at the Annual Meeting of the Lake Association, significant progress has been made on the Blue Mountain site. At the Nephton tailings site the areas covered by vegetation are, as yet, limited.

On Friday, July 22, 2013, there was a discharge of dust from the Nepthon tailings area documented through a number of eyewitness accounts, videos and photographs.

"In response to these observations the Ministry issued a Provincial Officer’s Order to Unimin requiring them to update their dust control action plan and to implement additional controls before the end of this week to prevent dust from leaving the Nephton tailings area. While in the past, Unimin has given the impression to the Ministry that they had full control of their dust problems; Friday’s observations certainly show that they do not. I would like to reassure you that the Ministry remains committed to solving this problem. Additional inspections are planned to ensure that Unimin implements the necessary dust control measures to prevent dust from impacting the Kasshabog Lake area." (Chris Johnson, MOE, Provincial Officer, Badge 782)
