= North River (Belmont Lake) =

- Location of the mouth of the North River in southern Ontario

Location
- Country: Canada
- Province: Ontario
- Region: Central Ontario
- County: Peterborough
- Municipality: Havelock-Belmont-Methuen

Physical characteristics
- Source: Imp lake
  - coordinates: 44°45′24″N 77°54′42″W
  - elevation: 302 m (991 ft)
- Mouth: Belmont Lake, on the Crowe River
  - coordinates: 44°30′17″N 77°50′03″W
  - elevation: 187 m (614 ft)

Basin features
- River system: Great Lakes Basin

The North River is a river in the municipality of Havelock-Belmont-Methuen, Peterborough County in Central Ontario, Canada. It is part of the Great Lakes Basin, and is a right tributary of the Crowe River.

The river begins at Imp Lake in geographic Methuen Township and flows south, past the Blue Mountain Mine at Devil's Lake, to Kasshabog Lake. It continues south to Long Lake, then turns east, then resumes a southward direction, and enters geographic Belmont Township. The river passes through Round Lake, turns east, and reaches its mouth at Belmont Lake on the Crowe River, which flows via the Trent River to Lake Ontario.

== Tributaries ==
- Otter Creek (left)
- Whitney Creek (left)
- Beloporine Creek (right)

== See also ==
- List of Ontario rivers

== Sources ==
- Map 6 (PDF) (Map). 1 : 700,000. Official road map of Ontario. Ministry of Transportation of Ontario. 2014.
- Restructured municipalities - Ontario map #5 (Map). Restructuring Maps of Ontario. Ontario Ministry of Municipal Affairs and Housing. 2006. Archived from the original on 2020-05-11.
