= Havelock station =

Havelock station may refer to:

- Havelock MRT station, a rapid transit station in Singapore
- Havelock railway station, a former railway station in Ontario, Canada
