= Belmont Lake (Ontario) =

- Location in southern Ontario
- Location: Peterborough County, Ontario
- Coordinates: 44°29′42″N 77°49′36″W
- Type: Lake
- Part of: Great Lakes Basin
- Primary inflows: Crowe River, North River
- Primary outflows: Crowe River
- Basin countries: Canada
- Max. length: 7.5 kilometres (4.7 mi)
- Max. width: 3.1 kilometres (1.9 mi)
- Surface elevation: 187 m (614 ft)

Belmont Lake is a lake in geographic Belmont Township in the municipality of Havelock-Belmont-Methuen, Peterborough County in Central Ontario, Canada. It is part of the water system that feeds the Trent Severn Waterway Great Lakes Basin.

There are 2 watercourses (rivers) that flow into Belmont and one exiting. The first, Crowe River, comes from the north from Cordova Lake and is navigable by small boat from the northwest part of Belmont Lake up the river for approximately 3 kilometers. It has deep and shallow sections and some areas that are rocky. The second inflow is the North River, which comes from Sebright Bay on Round Lake, is on the west side at approximately the middle point of the lake, and flows into North River Bay (some locals refer to this as Taylor Bay). There is a small waterfall flowing into the lake that varies in size depending on water levels at certain times of the year. The Crowe River outflow is on the east side at approximately the middle point of the lake. This river is navigable by small boat for approximately 1 km to the Crowe River Dam. From there the river flows for almost 4 kilometers to Crowe Lake.

Belmont Lake has approximately 50 islands. Several of the islands are named. The largest is Big island. It is approximately 1 km long and 375 metres at its widest point. There are approximately 45 cottages on the island. The island is located in the middle of the lake. Belmont has a long history of cottagers because of its natural beauty. It is located on the southernmost point of the Canadian shield which is why most of the islands and surroundings are rocky.

Rumour has it that Belmont was suggested to be named Loon Lake because of the numerous loons found and heard on the lake year after year.

Belmont has a healthy fish population. Muskie populations which were healthy some years ago have declined due to the non-native Northern Pike species that have made their way into the lake. Perch populations have also suffered as a result. Other species such as Smallmouth and Largemouth Bass, Pumpkinseed (sunfish), Catfish, and Walleye are also found in the lake.

The old mills (no longer present) known as Ashby Mill and Rockdale are located on the south shore and at the Crowe River outflow respectively. The most southern part of the lake has a large bay called King Bay. The most northern part of the lake has a large bay called Deer Bay. It is approximately 7.5 km from the southern part of the main lake to the north part of the main lake. it is approximately 3.1 km wide at its widest point from the river inflow on the west to the river outflow on the east. Many of the older cottages are still present on Belmont Lake allowing it to maintain its "cottagey" feel.

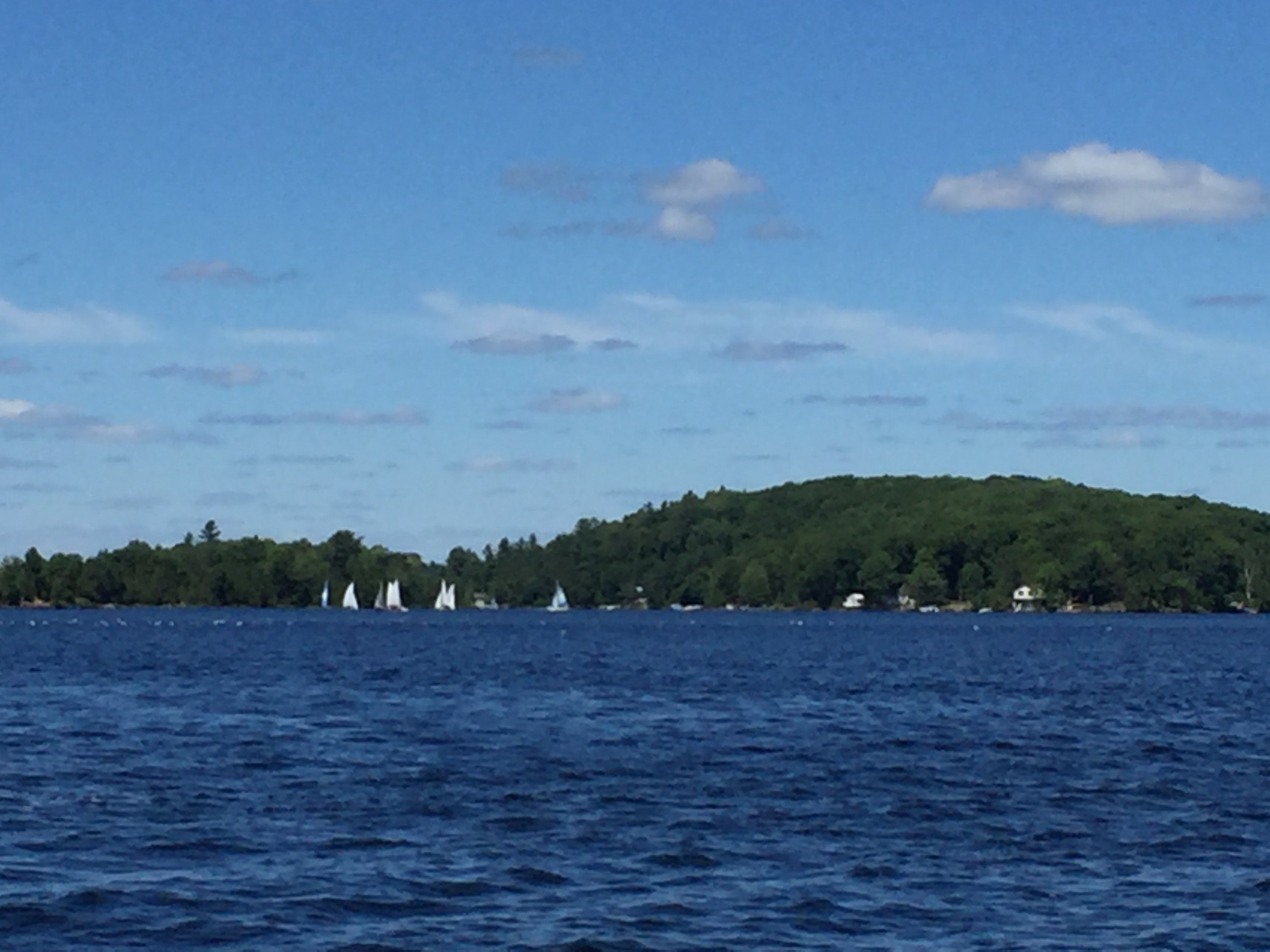
Belmont Lake sailing regatta
