= Chandos Lake =

Lake in North Kawartha, Ontario, Canada

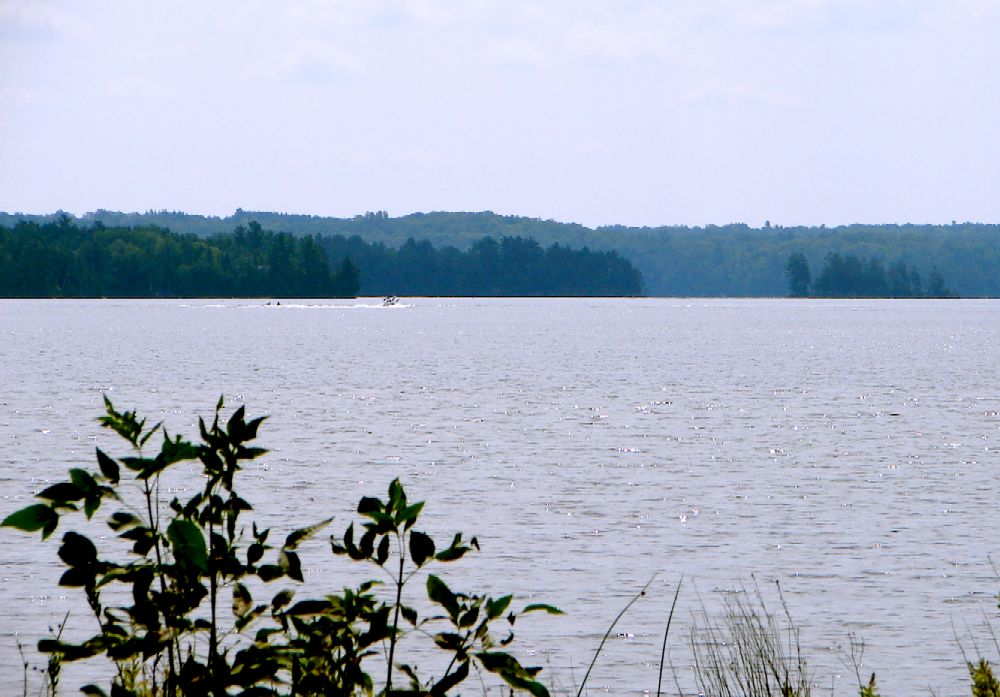

- Location within Ontario
- Location: Ontario
- Coordinates: 44°49′30″N 77°58′30″W
- Primary inflows: Springs
- Primary outflows: Crowe River
- Basin countries: Canada
- Surface area: 1,387 ha (3,430 acres)
- Max. depth: 48 m (157 ft)
- Residence time: 7 years
- Shore length^{1}: 56 km (35 mi)
- ^{1} Shore length is not a well-defined measure.

Chandos Lake is a lake in North Kawartha, Ontario, Canada.

The lake is in the shape of a reversed L, with three main bays: West Bay, connected to the main body of the lake by a long Narrows; South Bay, extending southwest and separated by a curved peninsula; and Gilmour Bay, a smaller, two-lobed bay on the southern tip of the lake, connected by Gilmour Bay Narrows.

Chandos Lake is fed by underground springs and by some small creeks, including ones that drain small adjacent lakes, including Tallan, Little Tallan, Clydesdale, and Lasswade Lakes. Chandos Lake is in the Atlantic watershed; it drains from its north end into Flat Creek (also known as Deer River), which flows into the Crowe River, thence to the Trent River and Lake Ontario. In spring, high water can flow in reverse from the Crowe River via Flat Creek into the lake. Chandos is the largest lake in the Crowe River watershed. Chandos Lake measures 1,387 hectares and has a maximum depth of 48 metres.

Chandos Lake was originally called Mongosogan by the Mississauga Anishinabe, on whose traditional territory it lies. It was called Loon Lake until 1937, when it was renamed, apparently after the then-existing township in which it was located. Although not one of the Kawartha Lakes proper, Chandos Lake is part of the Kawartha cottage country; the lake is lined with some 1,200 cottages. The lake features three marinas and a public beach. The towns of Apsley, Glen Alda, and Lasswade are located on or near the lake. County Roads 620 and 504 encircle the lake.

== See also ==
- List of lakes in Ontario
