= Havelock railway station =

Railway station in Havelock-Belmont-Methuen, Canada

Havelock
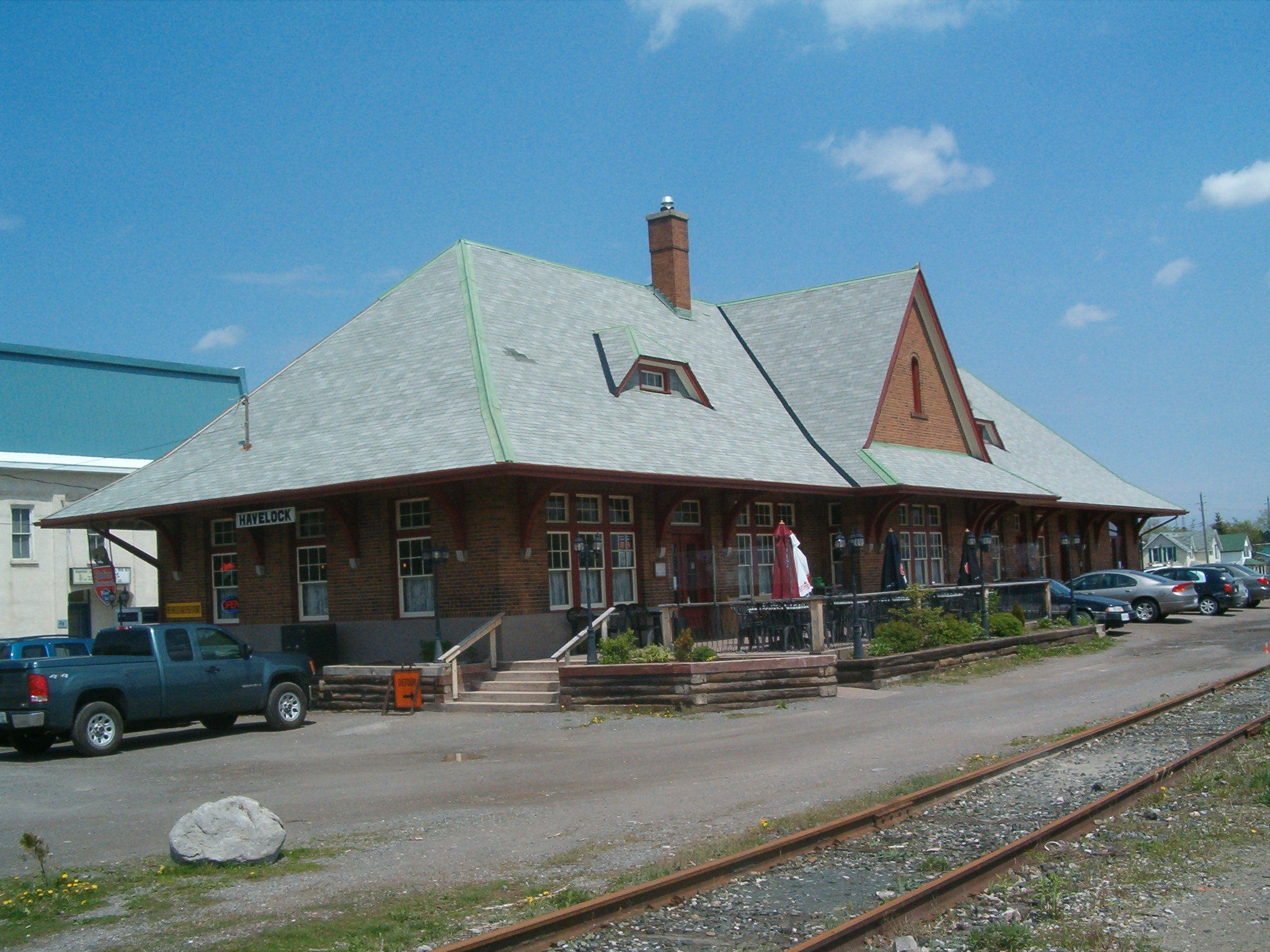
- View of the station in 2007

General information
- Location: 30 Ottawa Street East; Havelock, Ontario; Canada
- Coordinates: 44°25′59″N 77°52′58″W

History
- Opened: between 1914 and 1929
- Closed: 1965

Heritage Railway Station (Canada)
- Official name: Canadian Pacific Railway Station
- Designated: 1991
- Reference no.: 6701
Location

The Havelock railway station is a former Canadian Pacific Railway station in Havelock, Ontario. It is recognized as a Designated Heritage Railway Station. The station is located at mileage 93.70 of the Canadian Pacific's Havelock Subdivision.

The railway station is privately owned and not designated an Ontario Heritage building.
