= Paudash Lake =

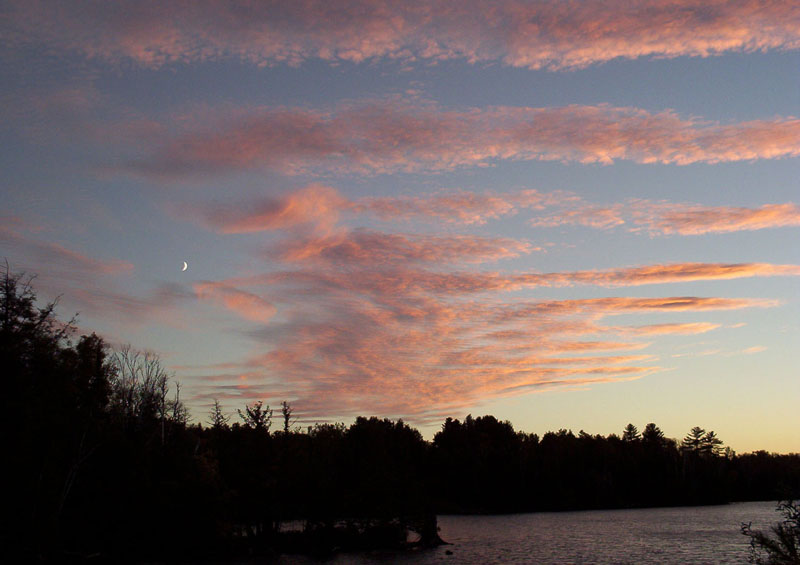
- Sunset over Lower Paudash

- Location within Ontario
- Location: Haliburton County, Ontario
- Coordinates: 44°58′N 78°03′W
- Type: Glacial lake, oligotrophic, dimictic
- Primary inflows: Natural springs, Silent Lake, Deer Lake, Anderson Lake, and Centre Lake
- Primary outflows: Crowe River
- Basin countries: Canada
- Max. length: 14.2 km (8.8 mi)
- Max. width: 5.1 km (3.2 mi)
- Surface area: 7.55 km^{2} (1,870 acres)
- Max. depth: 46 m (151 ft)
- Residence time: 3 years
- Surface elevation: 343.5 m (1,127 ft)
- Frozen: Mid-December to Late April
- Islands: Mullet, Johnston, Ross, Moulds, Burnt, Stringer, Big, and Birch
- Settlements: Paudash

Paudash Lake is a lake in south central Ontario southwest of Bancroft along Highway 28. The lake is located just north of Silent Lake Provincial Park in Haliburton County, 27 km (17 mi) south of the panhandle of Algonquin Provincial Park. The nearest communities to Paudash Lake are the village of Cardiff, close to the lake's Inlet Bay, and the hamlet of Paudash to the northeast of Lower Paudash Lake. Actually two lakes, 'Paudash' and 'Lower Paudash', the lakes are located on the Crowe River, near its head waters, which flows into the Trent River at Crowe Bay north of Campbellford.

== Geography and geology ==
Paudash Lake has several different sections within it; Lower Paudash Lake (Outlet Bay) to the east, North Bay to the north, Joe Bay to the southwest and Inlet Bay to the northeast. The lake has a surface area of 7.5 km^{2} (1,900 acres) and a maximum depth of 46 m (151 ft). Fish species include largemouth bass, smallmouth bass, walleye, lake trout, perch, pumpkinseed, northern cisco, white sucker, and small bait fish of various types.

The area contains over 10,000 lakes which were formed by glaciers some 11,000 years ago during the end of the last ice age. In the heart of the Ontario lake country are the two areas known as "Muskoka" and "Haliburton" (which are both actually a district or county respectively). To many people in Ontario, the area is part of what is known as cottage country, in reference to the some 250,000 summer cottages on the lakes of southern Ontario.

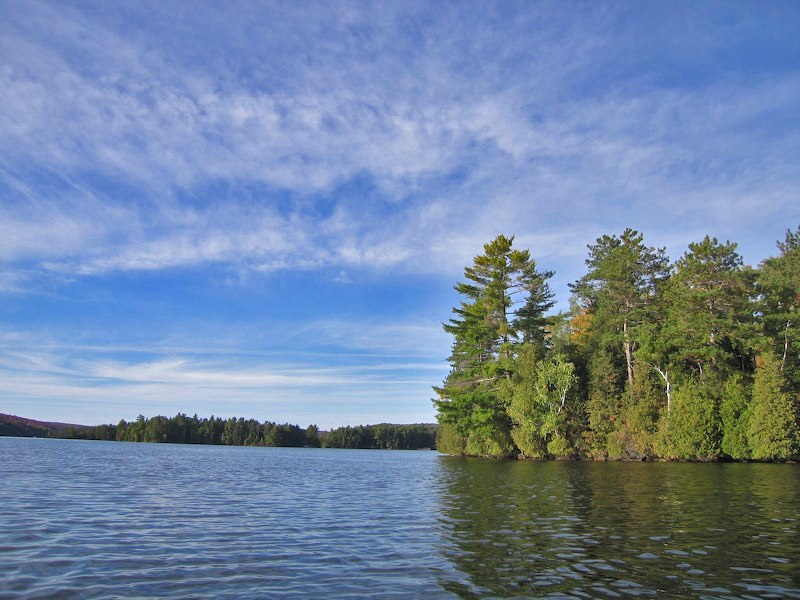
Towards North Bay

North Bay has massive pink granite, partially tree-covered cliffs, rising hundreds of feet out of the lake along the shoreline. Except in the bare-rock areas, most of the lake's shore is lined with trees and heavy foliage.

Paudash Lake is located within the Canadian Shield. During the last Ice age, glaciers scraped away a 1.6 km (0.99 mi) deep layer of rock, through to metamorphosed sedimentary deposits and the original Precambrian bedrock. As a result, the soil atop the Canadian Shield is typically thin, less than a 30 cm (0.98 ft) deep in many cases. In addition, there is a great deal of exposed bedrock, such as the beautiful cliffs on Paudash Lake.

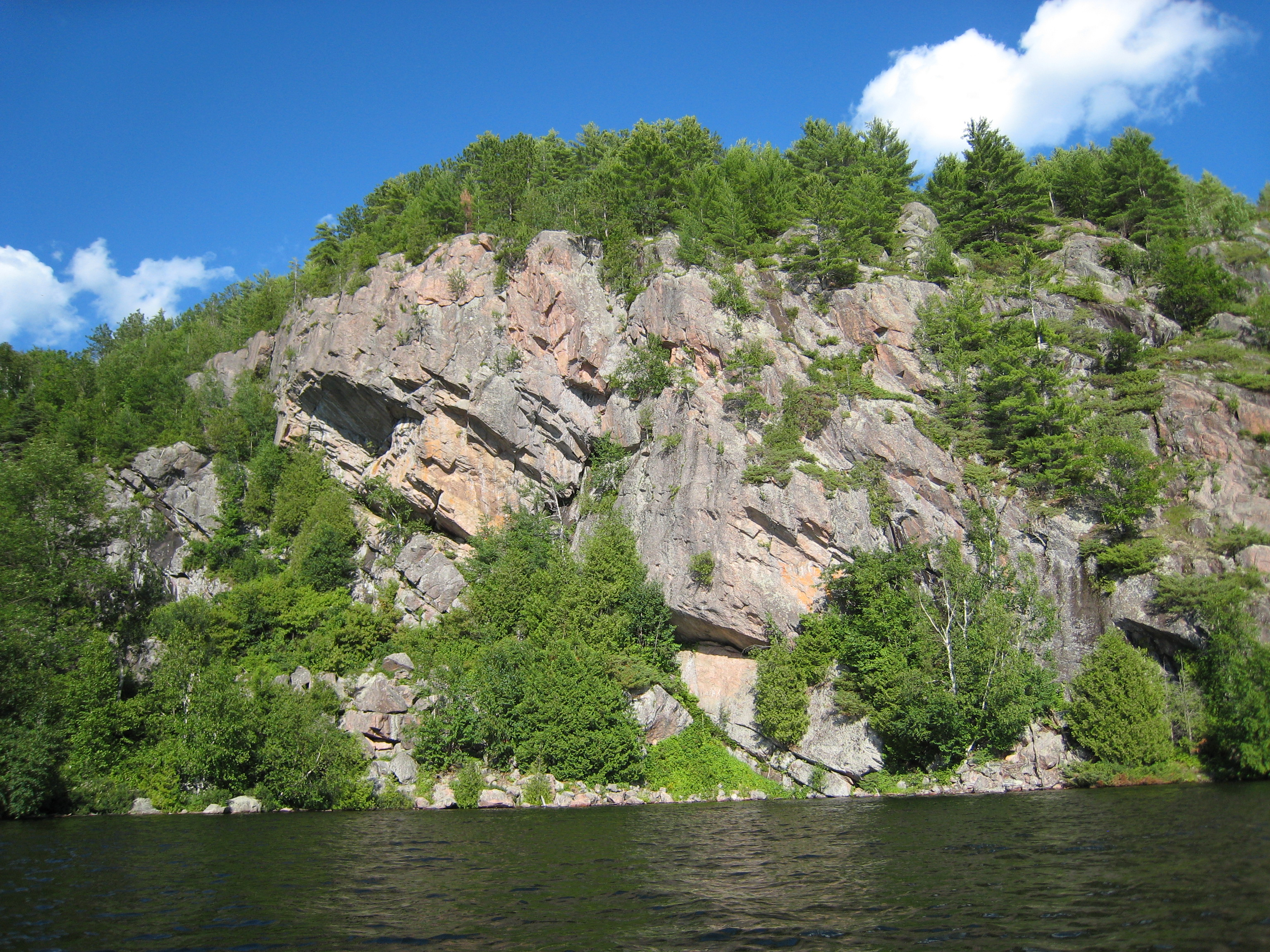
200 Foot Cliffs in North Bay

All of the lakes in the Shield were carved out or sculpted by glaciers, and usually have the characteristically rocky shorelines, although many depressions contain deep glacial deposits in addition to water. In the case of Paudash Lake, the local bedrock is metamorphosed sedimentary rock, including limestone (now marble), which helps to neutralize acid rain.

== Water and climate conditions ==
The water of Paudash Lake is clear and typically reaches 27 to 28 °C (81 to 82 °F) within six feet of the surface in the summer. The lake is fed by numerous small streams forming the headwaters of the Crowe River, including that from four small lakes including Silent Lake, Deer Lake, Anderson Lake, and Centre Lake. Based on this inflow, and the outflow to the Crowe River, the provincial government estimates that the water of the lake is replaced every three years. The lake is normally totally frozen over from mid-December to the third week in April, when the ice usually breaks up.

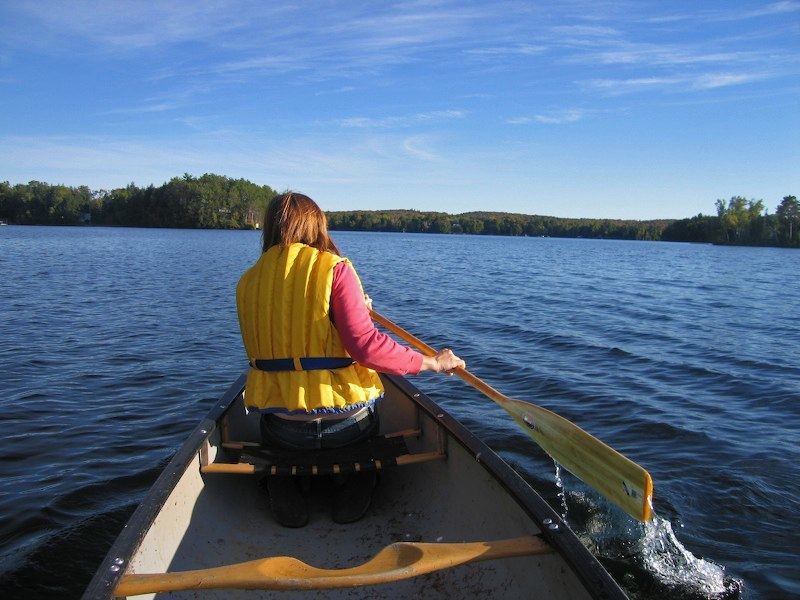
Canoeing on Joe Bay

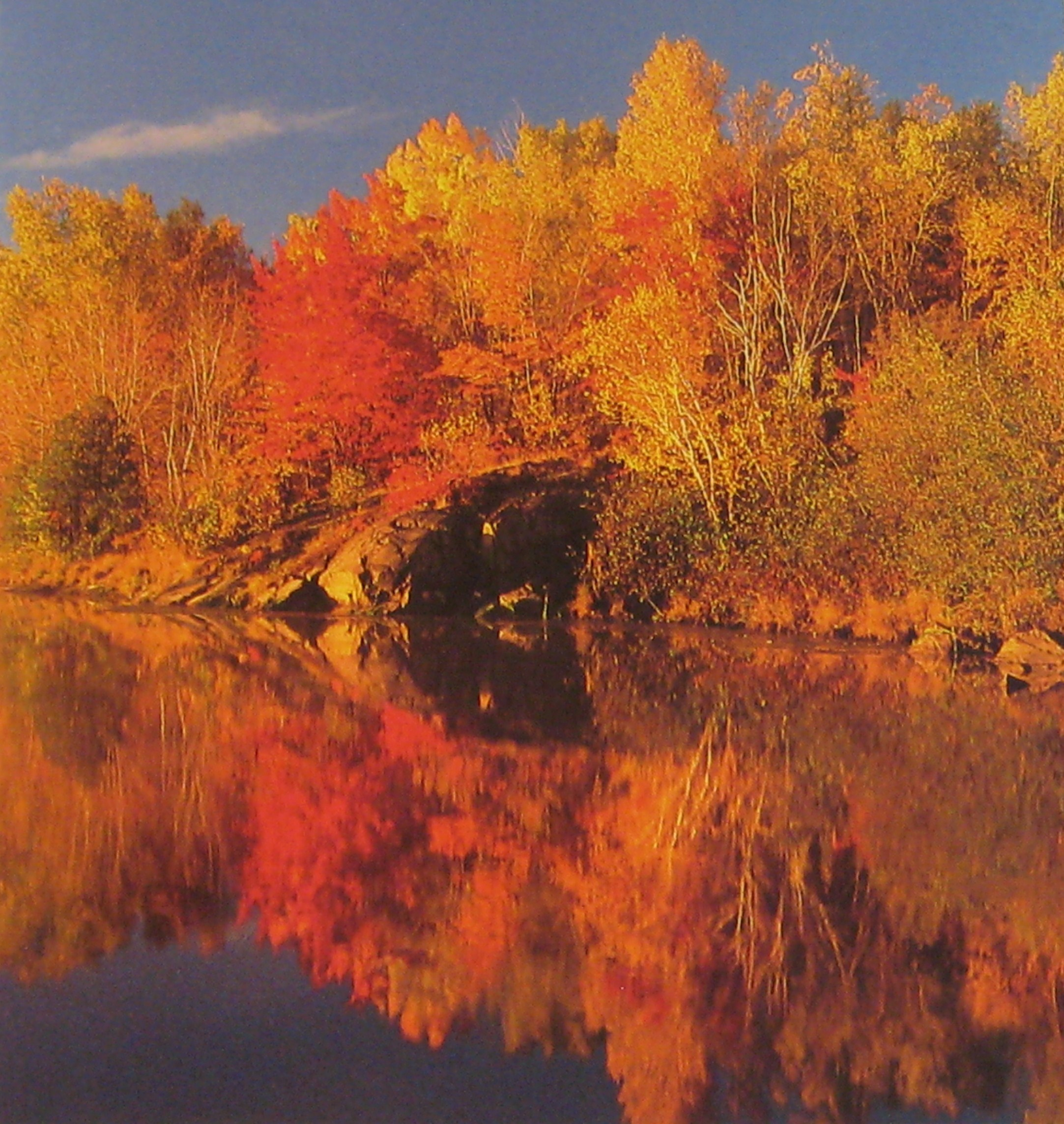
Paudash fall colours

== History ==
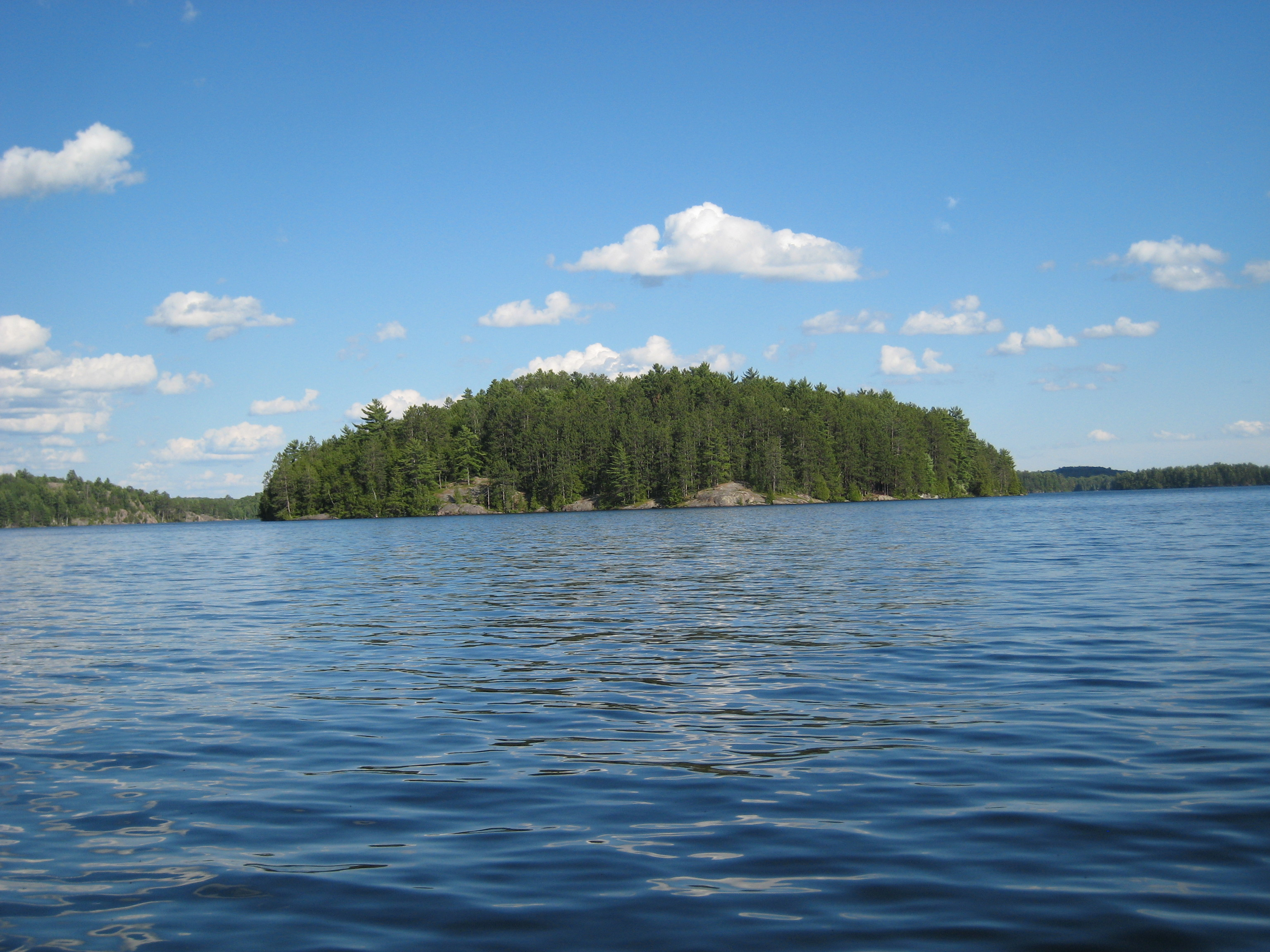
BIG Island in North Bay

Paudash Lake was named after Chief George Paudash, a Crane-doodem (clan) member of the Chippewa (Ojibwa) Indians of the Hiawatha Reserve of Rice Lake. The immediate area was first settled by pioneer families in the early 1870s. One of the original families, the McGillivray's, are still part of the Paudash Lake community. In 1875, Malcolm McGillivray Sr. took a land grant of 1.2 square kilometres (300 acres) at Concession V111, a point of land jutting into Paudash Lake, and later built the first bridge over the narrows between the upper and lower lakes (by today's Harmony Resorts-Paudash Lake). While the first summer cottage was built on Big Island by the Johnson family in North Bay in the early 1920s, there was very little development on the lake, and indeed in Haliburton as a whole, until the late 1930s, when the two great access highways from the south were constructed. Highway 28 in the east, and Highway 35 in the west, with Highway 118 later connecting the two. The War then delayed development on the lakes, and finally in the late 1940s, development got under way.

From the 1880s to the 1940s there were commercial resorts in Muskoka and Haliburton that were accessible by railroad and boat, with local transport over dirt roads by horse and buggy and later, cars and buses. The uncoordinated and ill-advised attempts by the government to develop Muskoka and Haliburton between 1850 and World War II for other purposes were a failure, however, due to the area's general unsuitability for agriculture and industry.

Major cottage development on Paudash Lake got underway in the 1950s and continued through the 1960s. Today, the lake is largely 'developed' with 640 properties, and virtually all new construction involves the removal of 50- or 60-year-old cottages and their replacement by modern cottages, usually designed by architects. Fifteen percent of the land on the lake is unoccupied, permanent 'Crown land', as well as one large island.

== Ojibwas on Paudash ==
The Mark of Chief Paudash (a crane), used on the treaty of 1818 which deeded to the Crown the area of Paudash Lake, et al.

On November 5, 1818, the six Chiefs of the Chippewa (Ojibwa) Nation of southern and central Ontario, including Chief Paudash, sold and conveyed to the Crown what is today all of southern Muskoka and southern Haliburton (below 45 degrees north), for the "consideration of the yearly sum of Seven Hundred and Forty Pounds Province Currency in goods at the Montreal price". Chief Paudash's "mark" on the Treaty was, in accordance with the custom of signing as a representative of the Crane-doodem, a tiny stick drawing of a Crane (Public Archives of Canada R.G. 10, ser.4, v.2, Treaty No. 20.). The use of the Crane-doodem agrees with accounts that say the Chief who made the mark, probably George Paudash father of Mosang, and grandfather of Robert, was the last hereditary grand chief of the Missassaugas. The grand chief was derived from the chief of the dominant doodem. This is coincidentally interesting also because the crane image dominates the Petroglyphs at Stoney Lake in Petroglyph Provincial Park. It MIGHT suggest that the crane is a recent addition graphically laying claim to the site by the Ojibwa (or at least Mississaugas).

Despite the fact that Paudash Lake is named after an Indian Chief, there is universal agreement among anthropologists and archeologists that the Ojibwa tribe of Ontario never established regular settlements in most of Haliburton. This was not simply due to the Indians' nomadic habits, but also due to the extremely long and harsh winters and the lack of major rivers bisecting the area for transportation. Another significant influence was that the lakes in Haliburton were not a major food source. But this is actually irrelevant because it is common knowledge among Ojibwa themselves and among scholars of other aboriginal hunter-fisher-gatherer peoples, that they did not establish permanent settlements because they had to move from one site of hunting-fishing-gathering to another and stayed only as long as needed. (It would be analogous to how modern sports fishermen try one lake and another, one spot and another.) But this has nothing to do with naming. As with the Eels Lake and Jacks Lake south of Paudash, it was the practice of early settlers - when the Indian presence still had strength - to name lakes after the apparent dominant Indian clan or extended family patriarch or chief. Jack's Lake was named after Jack Cow and Eels Lake after Eel Cow. It follows that settlers experienced the visits now and then of the Paudash family at Paudash Lake and that was how the name was established.

As Haliburton did, and still does, contain a tremendous amount of game, the Ojibwa tribe did use the area as a summer hunting ground at least at the time of early settlers. At the time of the early settlers in the 1870s and 1880s, there were still small Indian hunting parties passing through the Paudash Lake area during the summer. While they had no permanent camp on the lake, the hunting parties would occasionally spend the night on Wolf Point on Joe Bay or at the north end of Silent Lake. Certainly Paudash Lake did have an earlier name in the Anishinaabe language spoken by the Ojibwa, as did all major Haliburton lakes. However, very few other major Haliburton lakes have retained Anishinaabe associated names, the most notable being Kashagawigamog (long-winding-water). But settlers did have a tendency of naming lakes after the clan chief who appeared to identify with a lake, as described above, and for that reason the use of the Paudash name could suggest that the Paudash clan frequented that lake and considered it their hunting-fishing territory in the same way Jack's Lake and Eel's Lake were named after two brothers - Jack and Eel, and that settler history shows Jack fiercely claiming his territory (breaking beaver traps set by others). In early settler times, names of lakes were not given by governments but by settlers according to what family or chief/patriarch of clan seemed to claim it their territory. Aboriginal boat using hunter gatherer tribes were organized in this way - and it is a natural pattern because it can be found throughout the northern wilderness among boat-using peoples - they defined their hunting territories according to water basins, and if it was a river, then the extended families or clans claimed tributaries and lakes of that river system. There could be some 5-6 clans on branches of that river system. wandering from campsite to campsite in a territory determined by this activity, dependent on where their canoes could go. But these clans might be small - maybe a dozen or so people - and natural human social needs brought clans together usually annually in a common place. For river oriented clans, that common place would be at the bottom of that river system. Paudash Lake, like Eels and Jacks, not to mention Stoney and others, are all on waterways flowing to Rice Lake; thus Rice Lake became the congregating site and governments saw it, and most early original reserves were defined at these congregating sites and then the clans were encouraged to remain and farm and not travel to their traditional hunting territory (that was passed down from father to son within a clan). Paudash Lake, thus, is a Rice lake Ojibwa lake, and that is why its name is Paudash - the same as that of a dominant Rice Lake family in Ojibwa history.

By the time the Pilgrim Fathers landed in the Mayflower at Plymouth Rock in 1620, French Canadians had already explored Muskoka and Haliburton and had established relations with the Indians on Georgian Bay of the Great Lake Huron, even further west of Muskoka. Indeed, before England took over New France, French were dealing with the Ojibwa. But the matter of the Rice Lake and in general Mississauga Ojibwa is complicated because the Mohawks invaded southern Ontario in the mid-1600s and pushed the original Huron settlements, and any Algonquian (Ojibwa) friends north up the Trent Severn valley. There is a question of whether the Mississaugas originated on the north shore of Lake Huron, or whether they were originally the Ojibwa of the major north lake Ontario rivers who were driven out in the mid-1600s along with their friends the Hurons, and returned in the late 1600s to reclaim their original territories from the Mohawk nations who had settled there. (All those settlements vanished by 1700, and what remained in all areas were the Mississaugas.) This is the relevance of the French information, but its relationship to Paudash Lake is quite indirect and this entire paragraph is going somewhat off the subject of Paudash Lake.

== Wildlife ==
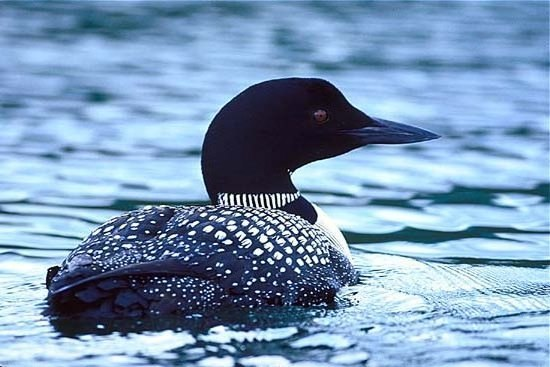
Common loon on Paudash

Paudash Lake is largely surrounded by semi-wilderness, which usually begins right behind the cottages near the lakeshore. The larger mammals include the American black bear, moose, elk, the eastern Canadian wolf, white-tailed deer, the North American cougar, and the Canadian lynx. The smaller mammals include the red fox, beaver, raccoon, muskrat, mink, otter, marten, fisher, weasel, ermine, skunk, porcupine, woodchuck, red and gray squirrel, northern flying squirrel, the snowshoe rabbit, and various shrews, moles, bats, chipmunks, voles, mice, and lemmings.

Reptiles and amphibians include the snapping, spotted, wood, blanding's, and painted turtle, American toad, spring peeper, and the gray tree, striped chorus, bull, green, mink, wood, pickerel, and leopard frog. There are no poisonous snakes in Haliburton, but there are the following non-poisonous snakes: common garter, common water, brown, eastern ribbon, hognose, eastern ringneck, smooth green, milk, and red-bellied.

The unofficial symbol of Haliburton and Muskoka is the loon, also honoured as Ontario's provincial bird. In addition to loons, other water birds on the lake include the great blue heron, the great egret, the sandhill crane, and the hooded merganser. Other water birds include a wide variety of ducks, grebes, bitterns, herons, terns, and mergansers as well as the Canada goose, the double-crested cormorant, the ring-billed and herring gull, the common sandpiper, the killdeer, the common snipe, the Virginia rail, the sora, the American coot, and the common moorhen.

== Boreal tree varieties ==
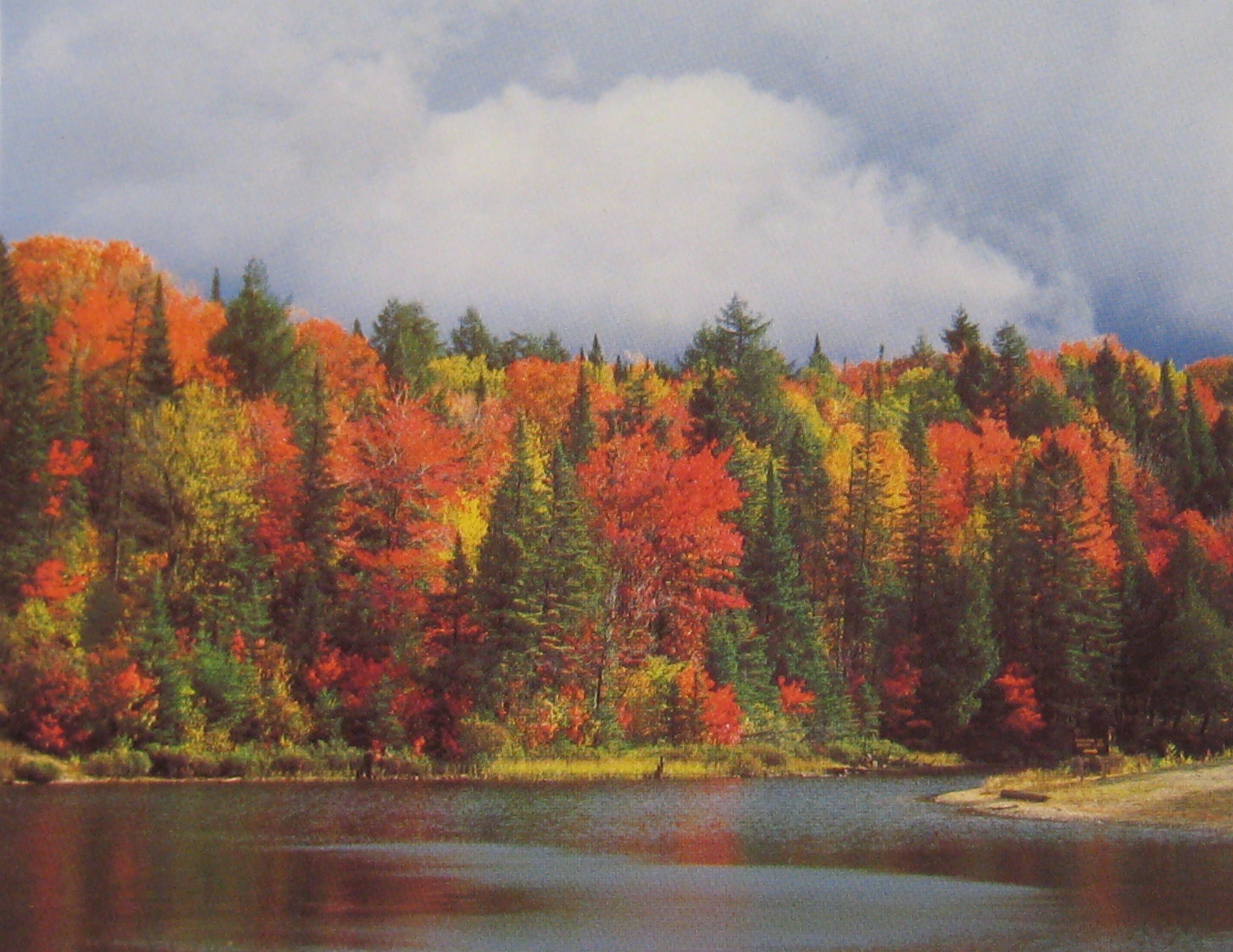
Haliburton in the fall

Paudash Lake lies within the Great Lakes-St. Lawrence Forest region. The native trees of the Paudash Lake area include the silver, red, sugar, mountain, and striped maple; the jack, red, and white pine; the largetooth and trembling aspen; the yellow and white birch; black, white, and possibly red spruce; the bur and red oak; the white, black, and red ash; the pin, black, and choke cherry, and the balsam fir, eastern tsuga (hemlock), tamarack (larch), balsam poplar, white cedar (Thuja occidentalis), American beech, ironwood (Ostrya virginiana), and speckled alder.

== Environmental considerations ==
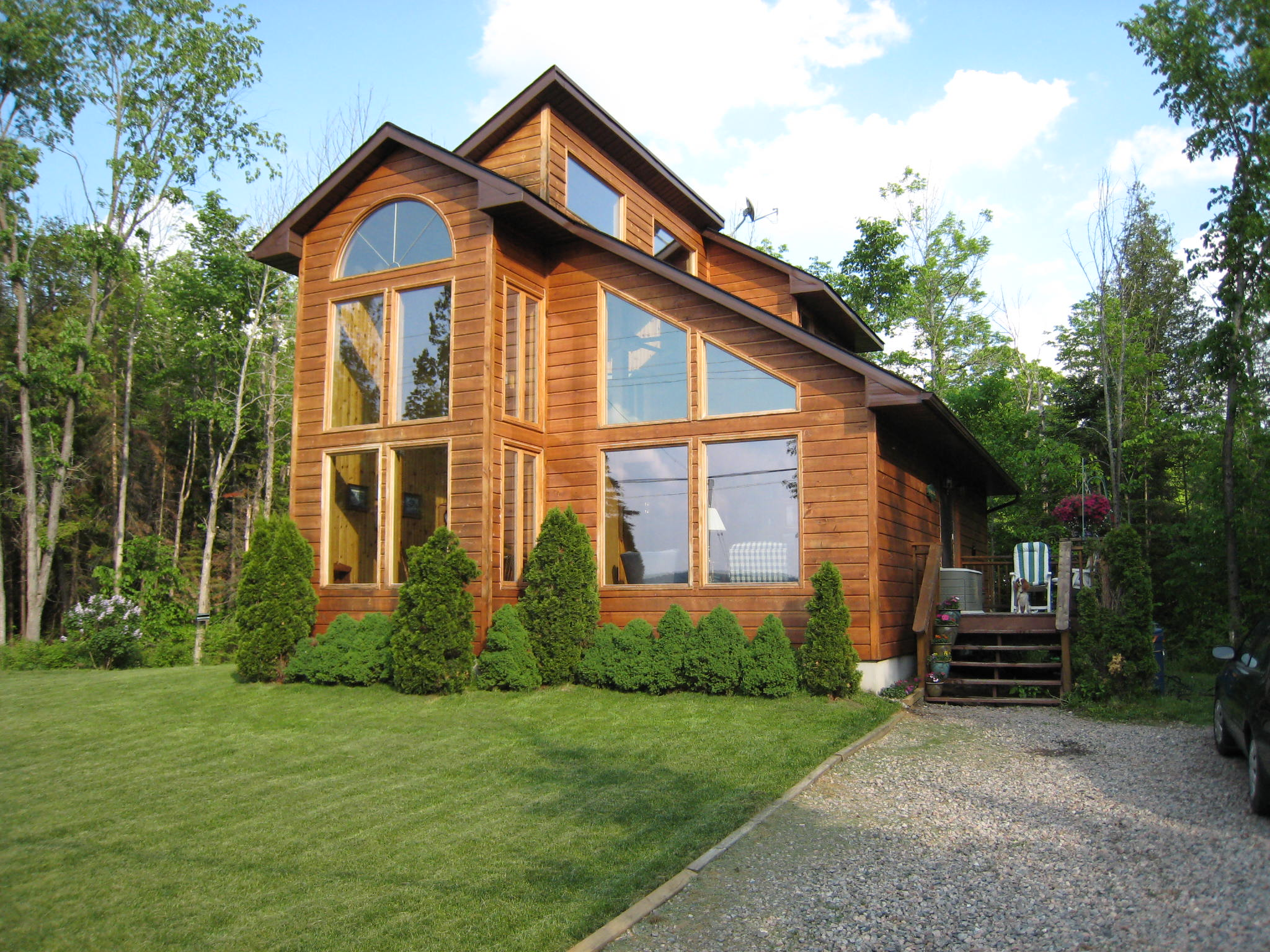
Contemporary Paudash cottage

During the last 40 years, a great deal of time and effort has been expended by both the government and the residents to ensure that Paudash Lake remains in as natural a state as possible and free of pollution. The installation of any septic tank system is carefully controlled by the building code and must be well removed from the lakeshore. Over the years, careful checks have been made to ensure against septic leakage into the lake, including dye tests in all septic facilities and tests for any septic bacteria around the entire shoreline. However, water quality problems from earlier area mining operations (i.e. Faraday and Dyno mines) are still adversely impacting water quality.

While Paudash is a natural lake, it is raised artificially with a small dam at the east end of the lake at the outlet to the Crowe River. This dam helps maintain the lake at a fixed water level.

In order to construct a boat dock on the shoreline, an approved plan and permit is required to ensure that the dock will not harm marine life. In addition, all property owners are encouraged to maintain their shoreline in a natural state, with attractive native foliage, and avoid fertilizing lawns.

Today, the lake is an example of conservation efforts over the years and has a local watershed conservation authority which works for continued success in this area. There have been efforts in recent years to ensure the undisturbed retention of the natural wetland areas of the lake which act as both a biofilter and a refuge for wildlife.

Paudash Lake is a headwater of the Crowe Valley Watershed. It is a cold water lake supporting a healthy population of lake trout and small mouth bass. Maintaining and improving water quality has been and continues to be a key objective of permanent and seasonal residents of Paudash Lake. The Paudash Lake Conservation Association, formed in 1973, has been engaged and effective in a number of initiatives to support this objective.

Data from the Provincial Water Quality Monitoring Network shows elevated concentrations of cobalt similar to those found in surface water around Cobalt, Ontario. Subsequent testing by the Ministry of the Environment concluded in a 2003 report that only sites immediately downstream of Madawaska Mine (none of which are on Paudash Lake) "consistently exceeded Provincial Water Quality Objectives (PWQO) for uranium contamination", but noted as well that concentrations of uranium and radon-226 in the top level of sediments in lower Paudash Lake are higher than background levels and higher than in subsurface sediments, suggesting relatively recent dispersal of these contaminants.

In general terms, the association tests each year for phosphorus and for water clarity and the results are shown to be relatively normal. There are 33 wetlands on Paudash Lake, and as a result of association activities, some years ago it was determined that they comprise a total of five wetland complexes, two of which are provincially significant. Billboards the association has placed at various public places around the lake identify these and educate the public as to the environmental protections these offer in maintaining water quality through filtration and the value they provide in flood control.

The association has significantly contributed to education and practical action in sponsoring a Shoreland Restoration Project involving the planting of indigenous plants in shoreland areas with voluntary public support in the 1990s, and subsequently in 2007 has offered a Dock Talk Program to local participants providing advice on a variety of issues affecting water quality, such as erosion, septic tank maintenance, water pollution and other issues with proposed recommendations for prevention and mitigation.

In 2004, the association commenced the development of a Paudash Lake Management Plan, with the participation and support of the entire Paudash Lake community, local municipalities and government agencies. The plan, published in 2006, contains more than a hundred recommendations relating on the one hand to proposals for inclusion in official plans and zoning bylaws and on the other hand advice to local residents concerning protection of water quality, water levels and fisheries and mitigation of noise, excessive boating traffic, reduction of night light exposure and many other factors. Water quality has been and remains a key concern and a consistent objective among residents of Paudash Lake.

== Roads and services ==
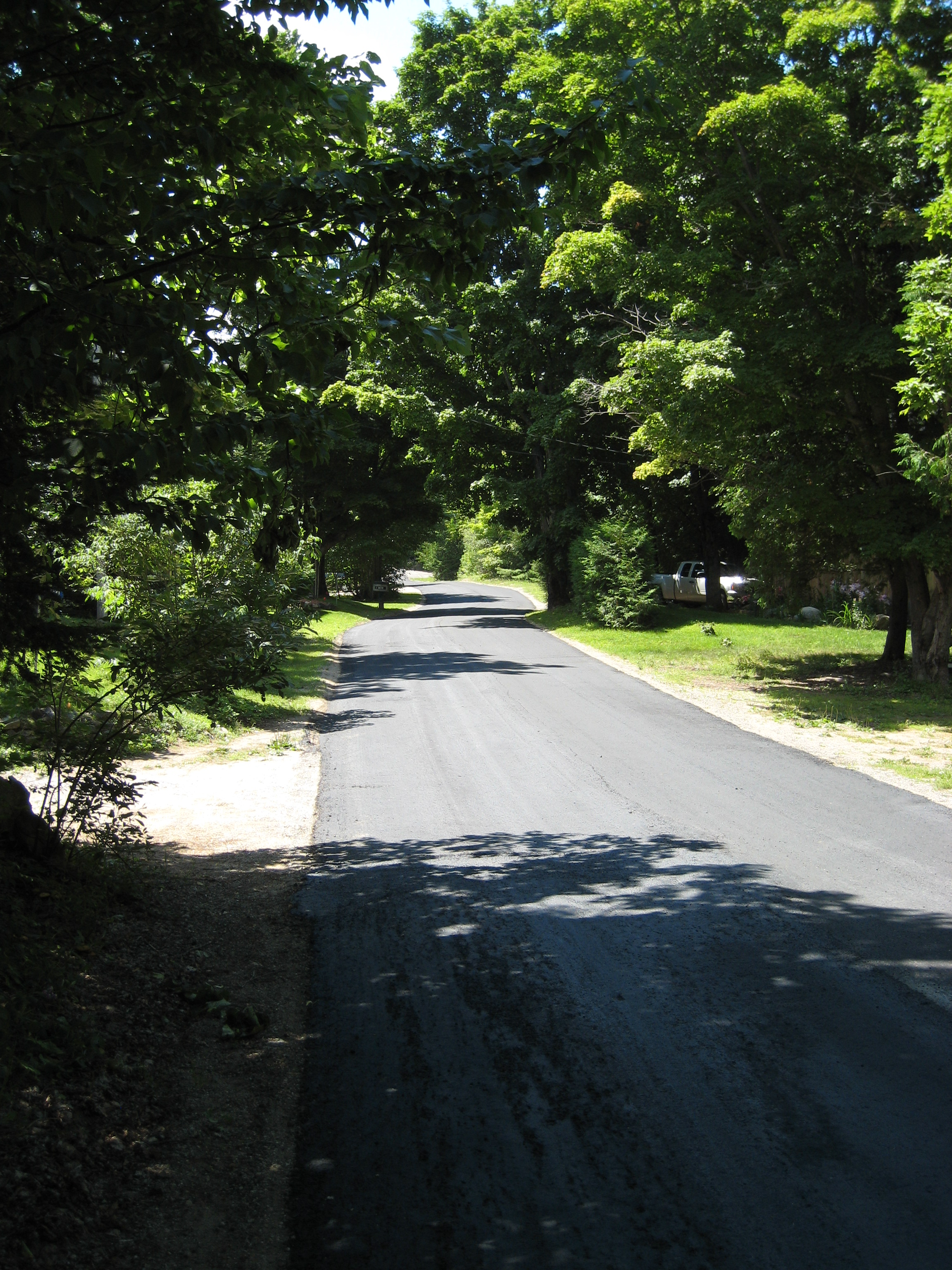
Typical part of Upper Paudash Road, Joe Bay

As of 2008, all properties on Paudash Lake are serviced by Hydro One, either by land line or marine cable. All properties are also serviced by Bell Telephone, by land line or marine cable, and all properties are within range of cell telephone service. Bell offers only dial-up Internet service, but satellite high-speed internet service is available. TV service is available off-the-air or by satellite, as there is no available cable service. The lake is in range of all major broadcast facilities; such as channel 2 Global, channel 4 and channel 12 CHEX (CBC), channel 6 CTV, channel 33 CBC and channel 42 TVO.

Properties on Joe Bay are serviced by all-weather roads, as are portions of Lower Paudash Lake (Outlet Bay) and Inlet Bay. There are still a number of shoreline areas in North Bay, Outlet Bay, and Inlet Bay which contain water access only properties and North Bay, itself, is largely inaccessible in the winter except by snowmobile. The lands surrounding the lake are by and large wilderness areas except for the narrow band of cottages near the shoreline.

Mail service is available five days a week, Monday through Friday, at either a post box on the property or at central post boxes placed at various locations on the lake access roads. The area is serviced by both FedEx and UPS, however, newspaper delivery is not available.

== Summer recreation ==
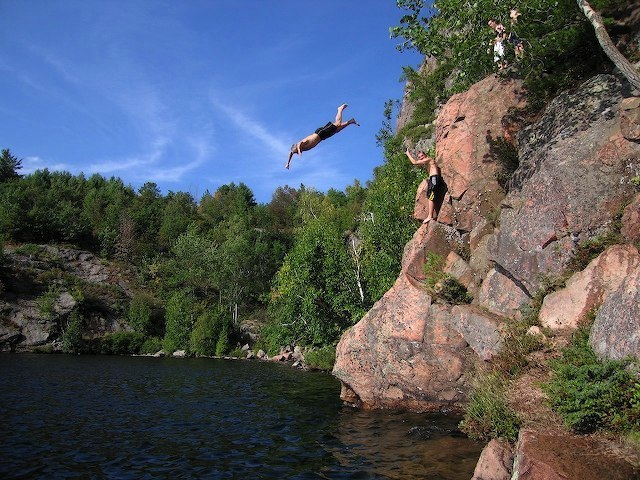
Rock diving in North Bay off Pink Granite Cliffs

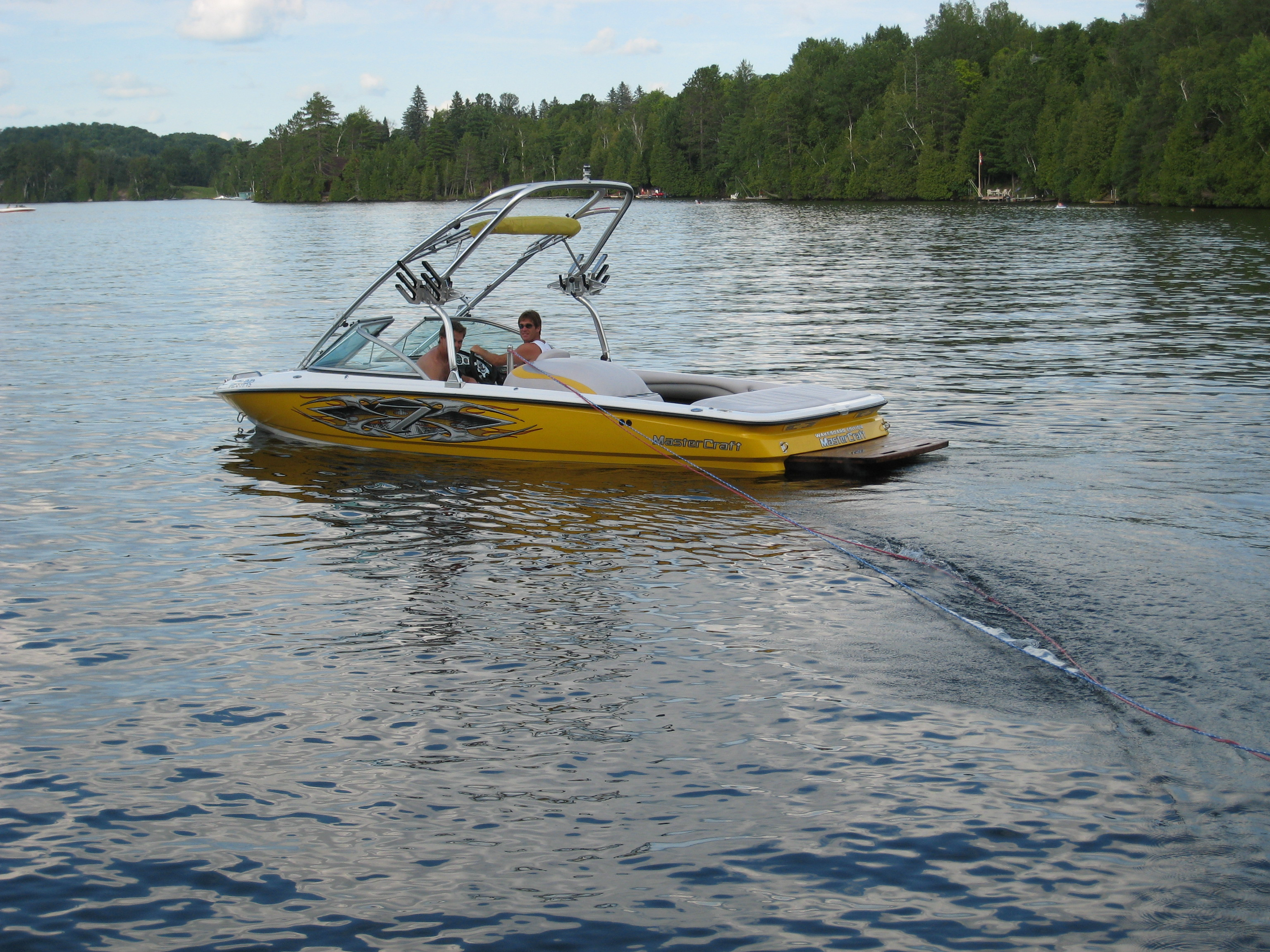
Wakeboarder on Joe Bay

North Bay features a public sand-bottom beach (with rest rooms) that can be accessed by car off of Highway 118 (via North Bay Beach Road) and by boat. The beach features a boat launching ramp and there is an annual regatta that takes place on the beach. Water-skiing and wakeboarding are available. Many of the classical outboard ski boats are seen, as well as the latest inboard wakeboard and ski boats and smaller sailboats. Boat traffic on the lake is usually quite moderate, even on holiday weekends. There are numerous species of fish available in the lake. There is also an annual Rock Bass Derby for the children of the lake held by the Conservation Association.

The Bancroft Village Playhouse is about 20 minutes from the lake and was built in the 1920s.

== Winter recreation ==
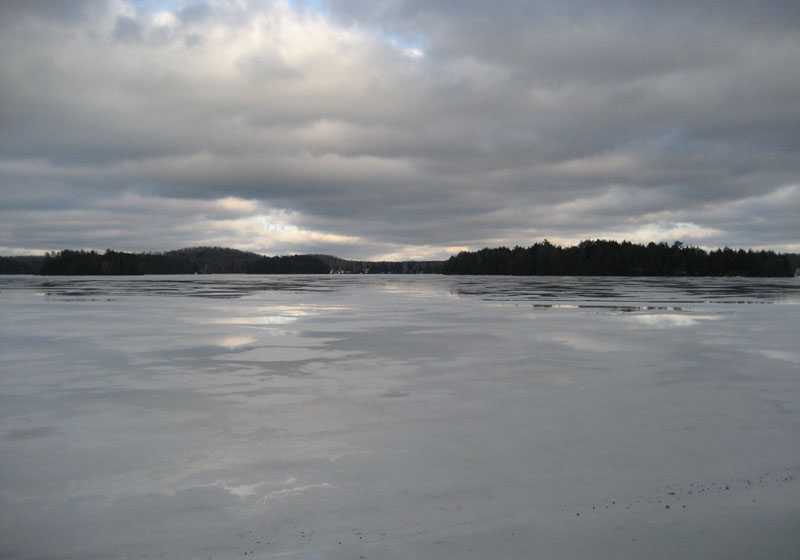
A part of Joe Bay frozen over during the winter months

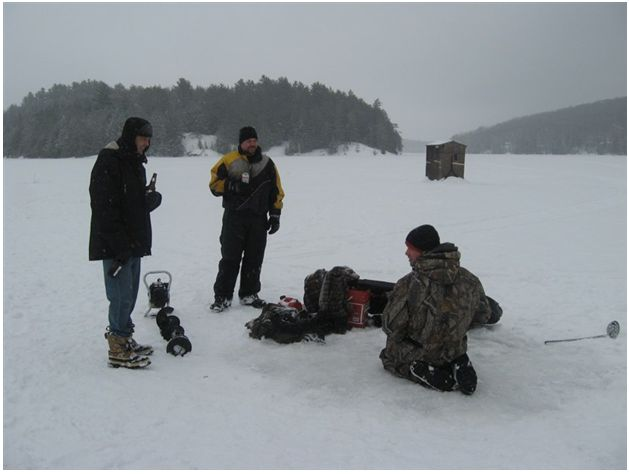
Ice fishing on the North Bay

Paudash Lake, like similar freshwater lakes in Ontario, freezes over during the winter months with 18 to 24 inches (46-61 centimeters) of ice which will support a fully loaded dump truck. During this time the lake is often traversed by snowmobilers and ice fishing is also common. Just over 1.6 km (0.99 mi) away, Silent Lake Provincial Park has over 40 km (25 mi) of cross-country ski trails, featuring natural, wood-fired warming huts along the trails.

The Paudash Trail Blazers Snowmobile Club maintain trails throughout the region during the winter months. The Central Region of Ontario contains over 5,500 km (3,400 mi) of interconnected, groomed snowmobile trails which, in turn, are interconnected to the Ontario system of 43,000 km (27,000 mi) of maintained snowmobile trails. During the last 20 years, the Ontario provincial government and the huge Ontario Federation of Snowmobile Clubs has spent some CA$$400 million on the development of the largest snowmobile trail system in the world. It is regularly patrolled by the snowmobile clubs and the Ontario Provincial Police.

== Marinas and lodging ==
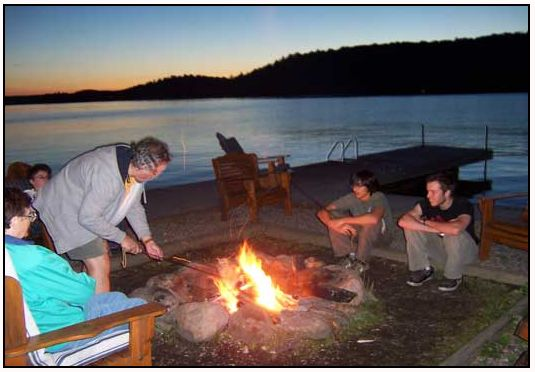
Bonfire at Somerset Inn, Lower Paudash

There are three marinas on the lake offering standard marine services. Lodging is also available.

== See also ==
- List of lakes in Ontario
