= Tangamong Lake =

Lake in Ontario, Canada

- Location within Ontario
- Location: Hastings County, Ontario
- Coordinates: 44°42′46″N 77°50′12″W
- Primary inflows: Crowe River
- Primary outflows: Crowe River
- Basin countries: Canada

Tangamong Lake is a lake in the Lake Ontario drainage basin in the township of Wollaston, Hastings County in eastern Ontario, Canada, at the easternmost end of the Kawartha Lakes chain. It is also part of area of responsibility of the Crowe Valley Conservation Authority.

Tangamong Lake is host to a variety of fish species, including; large and smallmouth bass, walleye, northern pike, perch, bluegill and musky.

The primary inflow is the Crowe River at the north, and the primary outflow is also the Crowe River, which exits the lake at thesoutheast to Whetstone Lake via a small waterfall. The Crowe River flows via the Trent River to the Bay of Quinte on Lake Ontario.

== See also ==
- List of lakes in Ontario
