= Jack Lake (Peterborough County) =

Lake and reservoir in Ontario, Canada

- Location on a map of Southern Ontario
- Location: Peterborough County, Ontario
- Coordinates: 44°41′41″N 78°02′08″W
- Part of: Great Lakes Basin
- Primary outflows: Jack Creek
- Basin countries: Canada
- Max. length: 6.3 km (3.9 mi)
- Max. width: 6.1 km (0 mi)
- Surface elevation: 280 m (920 ft)
- Settlements: Jack Lake

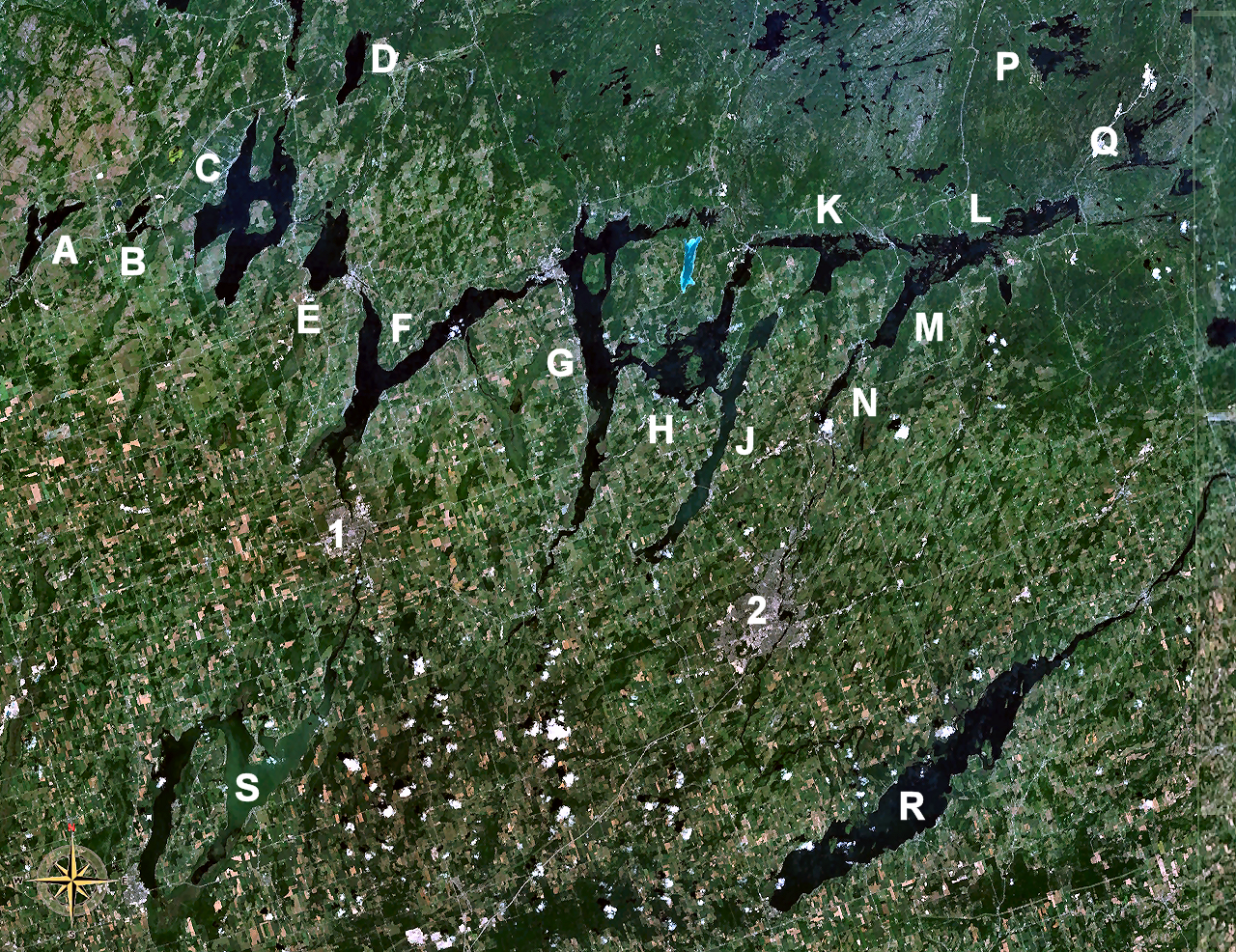
The Kawartha lakes with Jack Lake (P).

Jack Lake is a lake and reservoir in the municipalities of Havelock-Belmont-Methuen and North Kawartha in Central Ontario, Canada. It lies about 160 km (100 mi) northeast of Toronto, at the edge of the Canadian Shield in the northeastern portion of the Kawartha Lakes region. The lake is in the Great Lakes Basin, and serves as a small headwater pond for the Trent-Severn Waterway. The dispersed rural community of Jack Lake is on the northwest shore of the lake, reached by Peterborough County Road 52 and Jack Lake Road from the community of Apsley, about 5 kilometres (3.1 mi) to the north on Ontario Highway 28.

== Geography ==
The lake can be generally characterised as having a fairly irregular shape, dominated by three deeply indented main bays and having numerous smaller or tertiary bays. Named bays are Brooks Bay at the northwest, Callahan Bay at the middle east, Long Bay at the south, McCoy Bay at the southeast, Rathbun Bay at the middle east, Redmond Bay at the north, and Sharpe Bay (the largest) at the west.

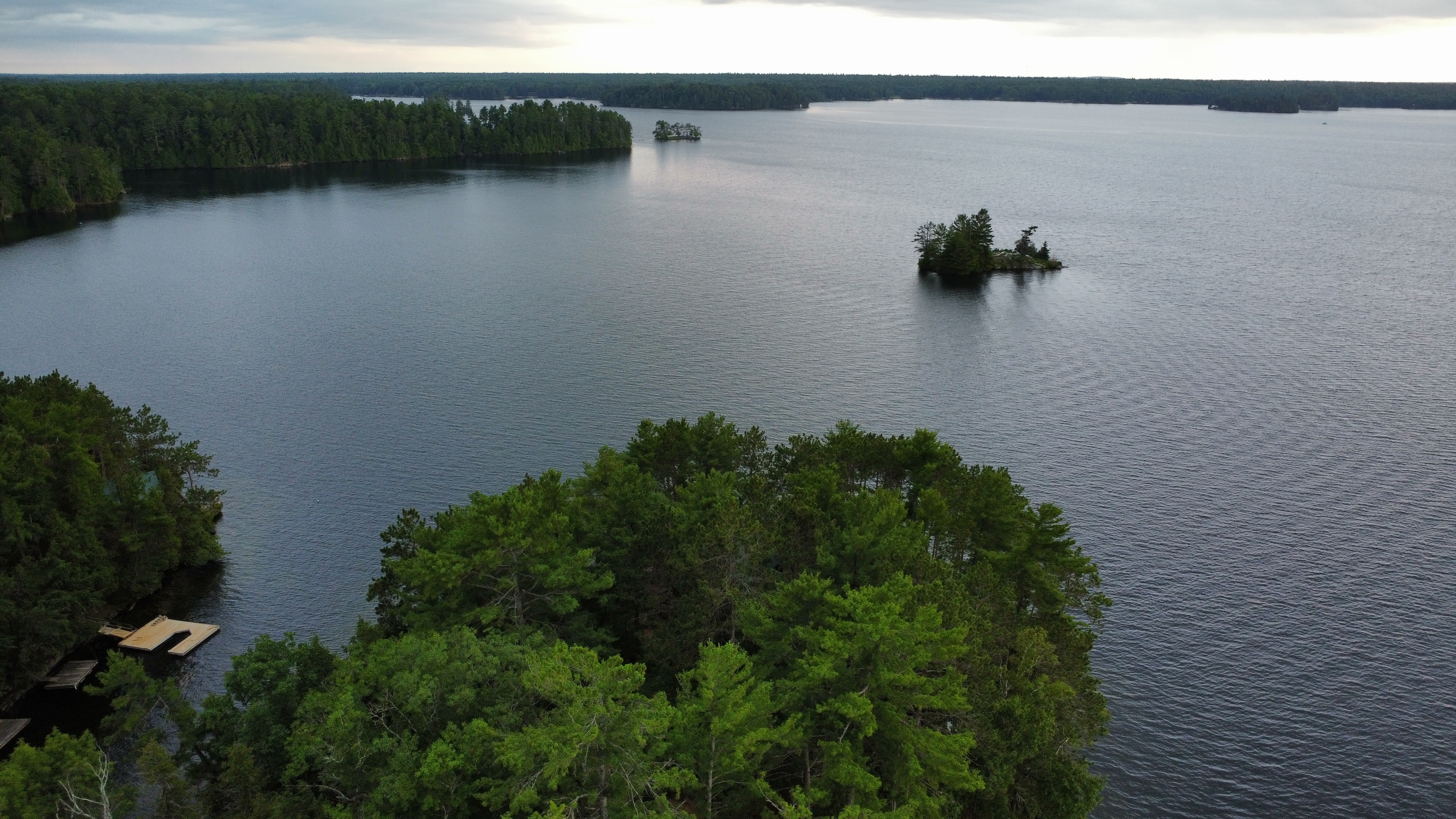
Sharpe's bay from Wager's Pine Point.

The primary inflows are Apsley Creek at the northwest and Redmond Creek (at Redmond Bay) at the north, and the primary outflow is Jack Creek leaving over a small dam at the south. Jack Creek flows to Stony Lake, Clear Lake, the Otonabee River, Rice Lake and the Trent River to Lake Ontario. The dam at the outflow to Jack Creek controls water released into the Trent-Severn Waterway to maintain a guaranteed minimum depth on that waterway. The average water level at the dam varies between a minimum of 1.2 metres (3 ft 11 in) in January and a maximum of 1.9 metres (6 ft 3 in) in May.

Jack Lake is at an elevation of 280 metres (920 ft).

== Natural history ==
The lake served as a field research centre, water quality monitoring site and testing or analysis base for Environment Canada's National Water Research Institute (NWRI) through into the 1990s. Specific and longitudinal research work has been supported by a variety of academic centres and universities over the past few decades. Work done during this period has helped to improve understanding of how freshwater environments are impacted upon by development, recreation and wider changes within the natural environment.

Jack Lake was originally home to bass and trout. As the lake developed as a tourist attraction in its own right, and as a feeder lake within the wider catchment that supports the Trent-Severn Waterway, fish species such as muskellunge, walleye, rock bass, and perch were also introduced from approximately the 1920s. More recently, Black Crappie have been introduced and are a primary target for summer and winter fisherman. Ongoing provincial and federally supported environmental stewardship and related work experience initiatives occur on the lake from year to year.

== Families of the Lake ==
The Lean’s were amongst the first pioneers of the lake. Later the Long’s, Wagar’s, Kennett’s, Jackson’s, William’s, and Washburn’s created familial legacies on the lake through either business or leisure.
