= Vansickle, Ontario =

Vansickle
- Dispersed rural community
- Location in Southern Ontario
- Coordinates: 44°37′01″N 77°49′19″W
- Country: Canada
- Province: Ontario
- County: Peterborough
- Municipality: Havelock-Belmont-Methuen
- Elevation: 260 m (850 ft)
- Time zone: UTC-5 (Eastern Time Zone)
  - Summer (DST): UTC-4 (Eastern Time Zone)
- Postal code: K0L 1Z0
- Area codes: 705, 249

Vansickle is a dispersed rural community and unincorporated place in the municipality of Havelock-Belmont-Methuen, Peterborough County in Central Ontario, Canada. It lies just west of the Crowe River on the border with the township of Marmora and Lake in Hastings County.
