= Jack Lake, Peterborough County =

Jack Lake
- Dispersed rural community
- Location in Southern Ontario
- Coordinates: 44°42′47″N 78°03′45″W
- Country: Canada
- Province: Ontario
- County: Peterborough
- Municipality: Havelock-Belmont-Methuen
- Elevation: 282 m (925 ft)
- Time zone: UTC-5 (Eastern Time Zone)
  - Summer (DST): UTC-4 (Eastern Time Zone)
- Postal code: K0L 1A0
- Area codes: 705, 249

Jack Lake is a dispersed rural community and unincorporated place in the municipality of Havelock-Belmont-Methuen, Peterborough County in Central Ontario, Canada. The community is on the northwest shore of Jack Lake, in the Kawartha lakes region, and parts of the community extend to the west into the neighbouring municipality of North Kawartha. Jack Lake is reached by Peterborough County Road 52 / Jack Lake Road from the community of Apsley, about 5 kilometres (3.1 mi) to the north on Ontario Highway 28.
