= Jack Lake (Halifax) =

Lake in Nova Scotia, Canada

- Location within Nova Scotia
- Location: Halifax Regional Municipality, Nova Scotia
- Coordinates: 44°44′16″N 63°40′43″W
- Basin countries: Canada

Jack Lake is a lake in Halifax, Nova Scotia Canada

== See also ==
- List of lakes in Nova Scotia
