= Crowe River =

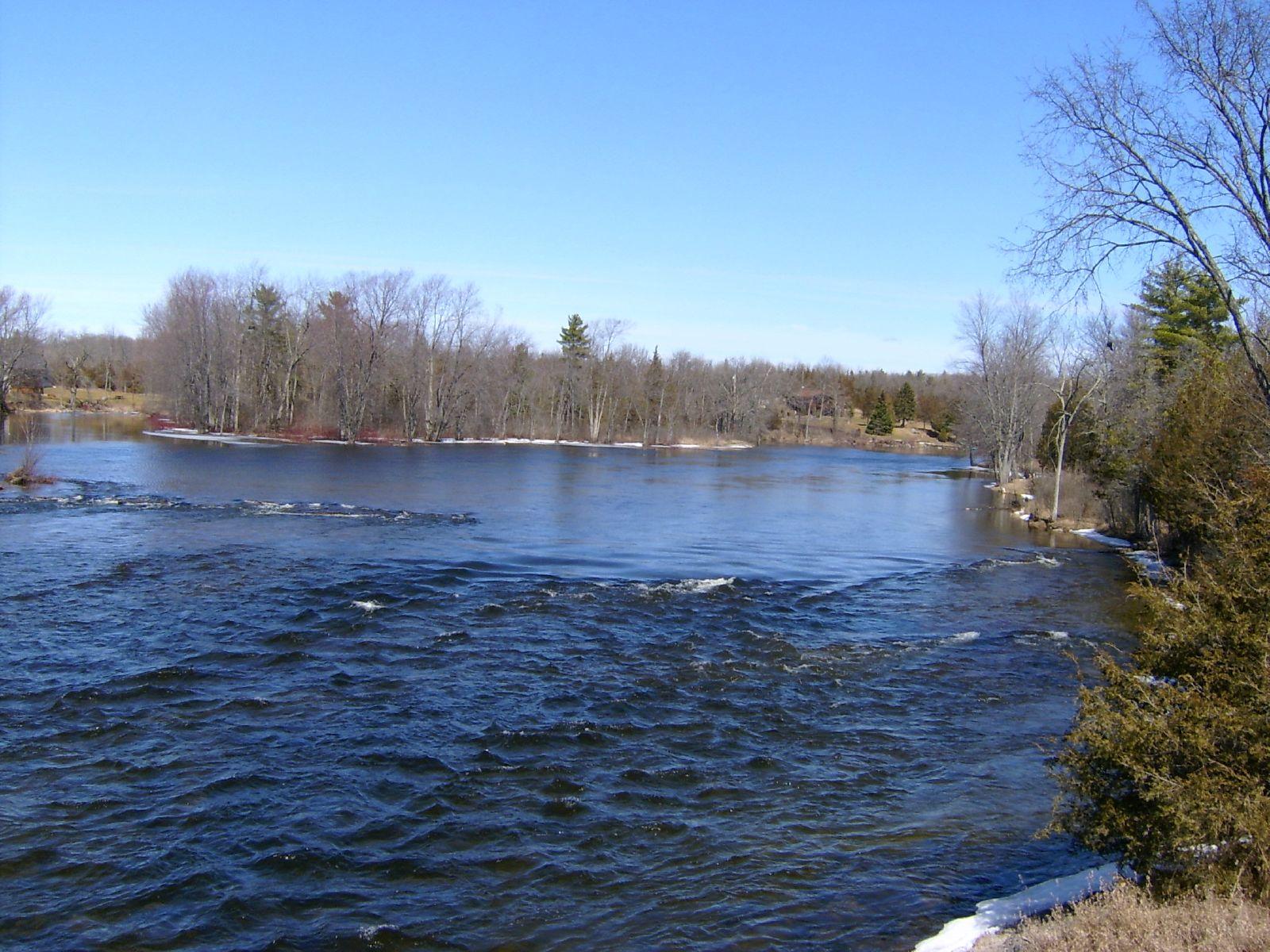
- Crowe River north of Crowe Bridge

- Location of the mouth of the Crowe River in southern Ontario

Location
- Country: Canada
- Province: Ontario
- Region: Southern Ontario
- Counties: Northumberland; Hastings; Peterborough; Haliburton

Physical characteristics
- Source: Paudash Lake
  - location: Paudash, Faraday township, Hastings County
  - coordinates: 44°58′50″N 77°58′25″W
  - elevation: 341 m (1,119 ft)
- Mouth: Trent River
  - location: Trent Hills, Northumberland County
  - coordinates: 44°22′23″N 77°45′49″W
  - elevation: 159 m (522 ft)
- Basin size: 2,000 km^{2} (770 sq mi)

Basin features
- River system: Lake Ontario drainage basin
- Tributaries
  - left: Beaver Creek, Green River
  - right: North River

The Crowe River is a river in the counties of Haliburton, Hastings, Northumberland and Peterborough in southern Ontario, Canada. It is in the Lake Ontario drainage basin and is a tributary of the Trent River.

== Course ==
The river begins at Paudash Lake and exits southeast out of the lake under Ontario Highway 28 and over Paudash Lake Dam at the settlement of Paudash in Faraday township, Hastings County. It turns southwest and heads through the southeast corner of the township of Highlands East in Haliburton County, then south into the township of North Kawartha in Peterborough County. The Crowe River heads south-southeast back into Hastings County at the township of Wollaston, passes through a 230-metre (755 ft)-long, 30-metre (98 ft)-high and 5-to-10-metre (16 to 33 ft)-wide gorge at The Gut Conservation Area, takes in the left tributary Green River, and reaches Tangamong Lake.

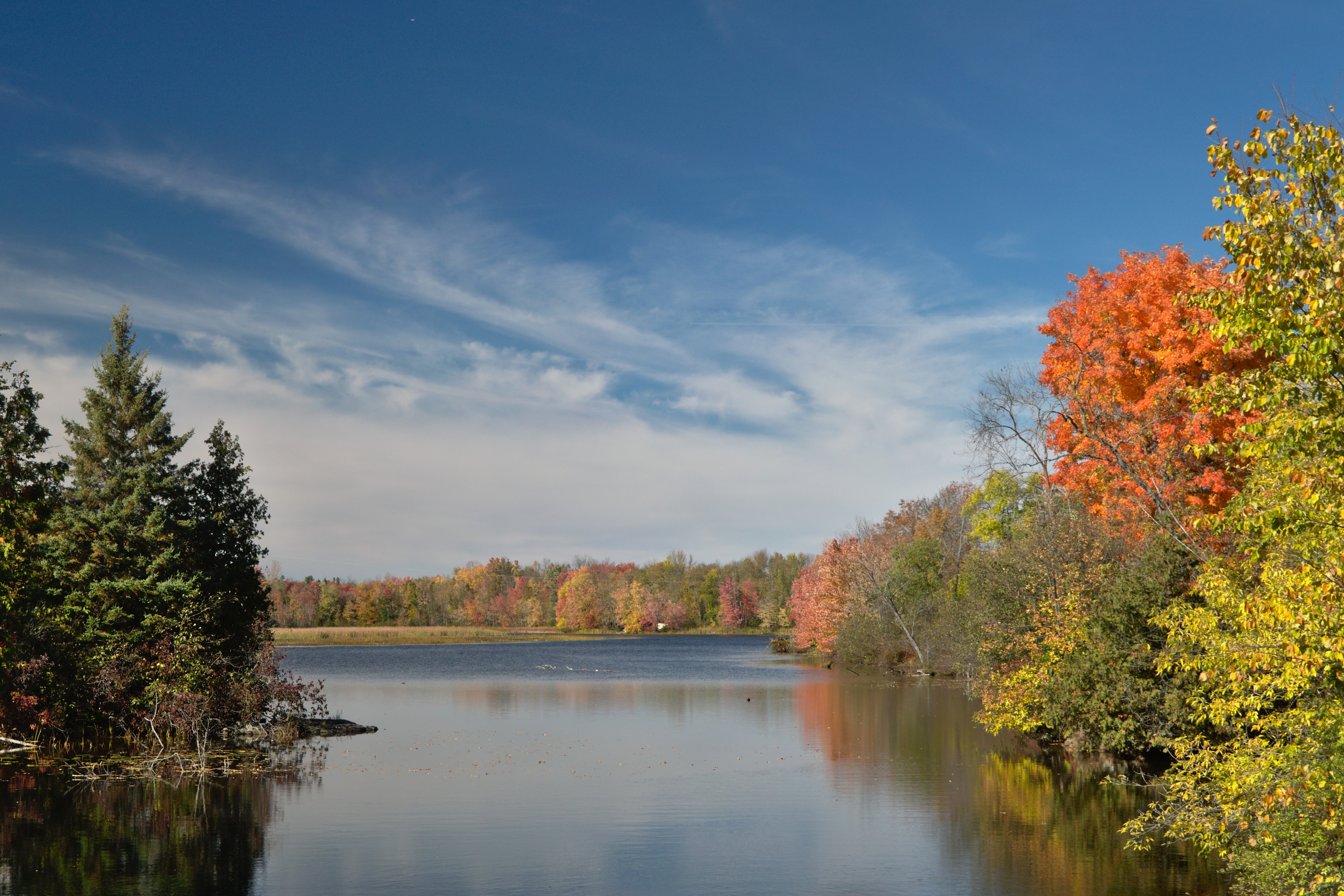
The Crowe River at Marmora

The river continues south out of the lake over a falls, takes in the left tributary Copeway Creek, passes into the township of Marmora and Lake at Mud Turtle Lake east of the settlement of Vansickle, heads back into Peterborough County at the township of Havelock-Belmont-Methuen, flows through Cordova Lake and out over Cordova Lake Dam, and reaches Belmont Lake where it takes in the major right tributary North River. It exits the lake from Crowe River Bay to the east over Belmont Dam to Crowe Lake, where it once again enters Marmora and Lake township, takes in the major left tributary Beaver Creek, and reaches the community of Marmora on Ontario Highway 7.

There, the Crowe River passes over Marmora Dam, heads southwest into the township of Stirling-Rawdon, passes over two one-metre (3 ft 3 in)-high and 40-to-60-metre (131 to 197 ft)-wide falls at Callaghan's Rapids Conservation Area, enters the municipality of Trent Hills in Northumberland County, flows over Allan Mills dam, passes over several falls at Crow Bridge Conservation Area, and reaches its mouth at Crowe Bay on the Trent River, just upstream of the Trent–Severn Waterway Crowe Bay lock and dam. The Trent River flows to the Bay of Quinte on Lake Ontario at Trenton.

== Watershed ==
The northern part of the watershed is sparsely inhabited Canadian Shield terrain. At Marmora, the watershed enters Paleozoic limestone-plain country, with unusual outcroppings of Canadian Shield through the limestone at Allan Mills and just above Crowe Bridge. The river drains an area of about 2,000 square kilometres (800 sq mi).

== Economy ==
At one time, the river was used to transport logs down to sawmills at Marmora. The river powers several small hydroelectric generating stations. The limestone-step falls at Callaghans Rapids Conservation Area and Crowe Bridge Conservation Area are popular sites for springtime kayakers and summertime swimmers.

== Tributaries ==
- Beaver Creek (left)
- North River (right)
- Copeway Creek (left)
- Green River (left)

== Communities ==
- Marmora

== See also ==
- List of rivers of Ontario

== Sources ==
- "Crowe River". Atlas of Canada. Natural Resources Canada. 2010-02-04. Shows the river course.
- Map 6 (PDF) (Map). 1 : 700,000. Official road map of Ontario. Ministry of Transportation of Ontario. 2010-01-01.
- Restructured municipalities - Ontario map #5 (Map). Restructuring Maps of Ontario. Ontario Ministry of Municipal Affairs and Housing. 2006. Archived from the original on 2020-05-11.
- "About Crowe Valley Conservation Authority". Crowe Valley Conservation Authority. Archived from the original on 2011-07-28.
