= Havelock-Belmont-Methuen =

Township in Ontario, Canada

- Township (lower-tier)
- Township of Havelock-Belmont-Methuen
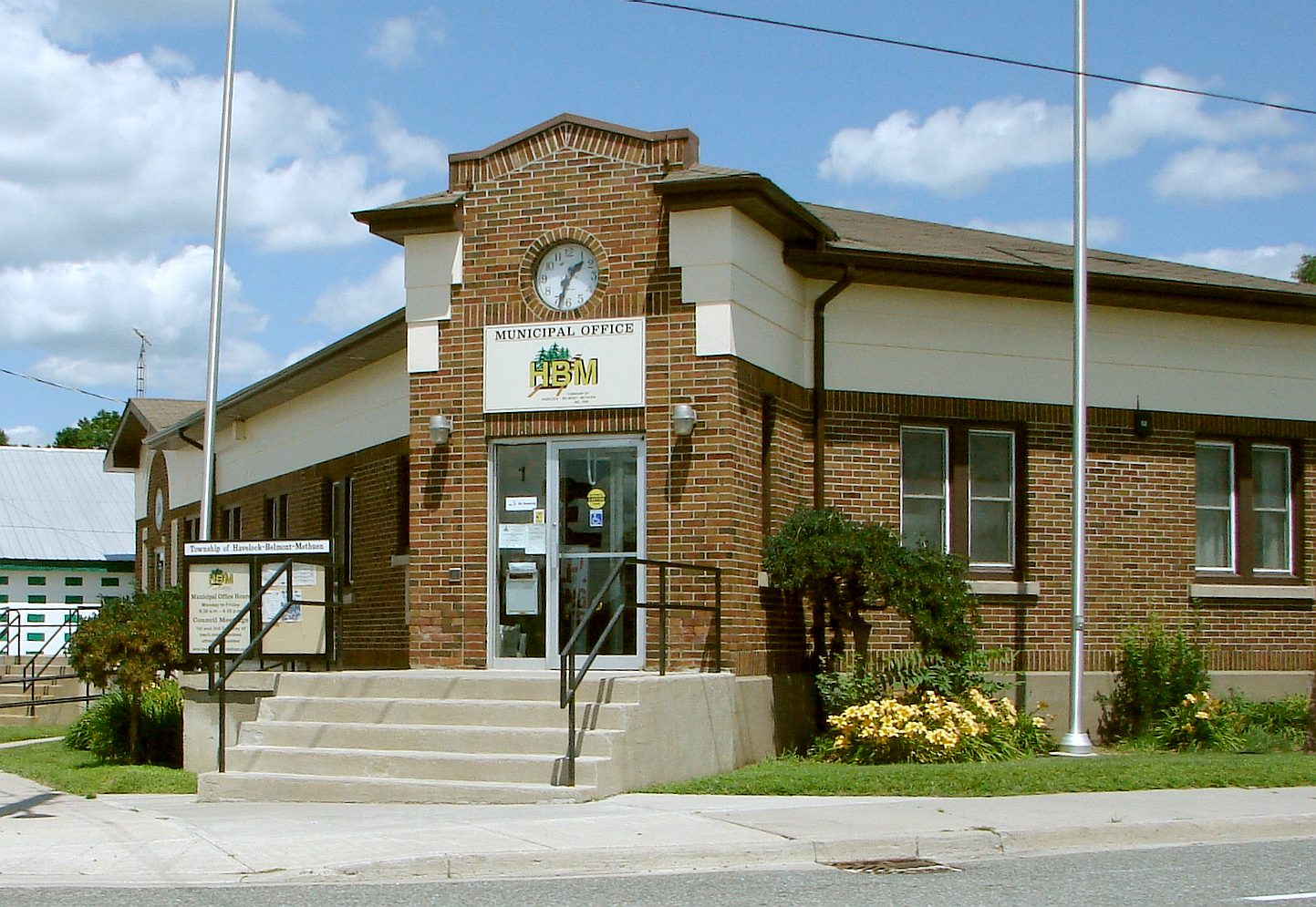
- Municipal office in Havelock

- Location within Peterborough County Location within Southern Ontario
- Coordinates: 44°34′N 77°54′W
- Country: Canada
- Province: Ontario
- County: Peterborough
- Settled: 1823
- Incorporated: 1998

Government
  - Type: Township
  - Mayor: Jim Martin
  - Deputy Mayor: David Gerow
  - Fed. riding: Peterborough
  - Prov. riding: Peterborough—Kawartha

Area
  - Land: 529.35 km^{2} (204.38 sq mi)

Population (2021)
  - Total: 5,083
  - Density: 9.6/km^{2} (25/sq mi)
- Time zone: UTC-5 (EST)
  - Summer (DST): UTC-4 (EDT)
- Postal Code: K0L 1Z0
- Area codes: 705, 249
- Website: www.hbmtwp.ca

Havelock-Belmont-Methuen is a township in central-eastern Ontario, Canada, in Peterborough County. On January 1, 1998, Belmont and Methuen Township amalgamated with the Village of Havelock to form what is now Havelock-Belmont-Methuen.

== History ==
The region's colonial history began with an influx of settlers after Belmont and Methuen Township was surveyed in 1823. The community of Havelock was incorporated as an independent village in 1892.

Havelock was named after the British general, Sir Henry Havelock.

Early settlers built their homes in an area of dense forests and numerous lakes and rivers within the rocky Canadian Shield. They survived by means of fishing, logging, and farming.

By 1869, Blairton, in the Township of Belmont County, was a village with a population of 500. The village was near the richest iron mines in the Dominion. Miners and laborers were in great demand. The village was a station of the Cobourg, Peterborough & Marmora Railway. The land in the vicinity was almost all taken up. There were stages to Norwood and Marmora.

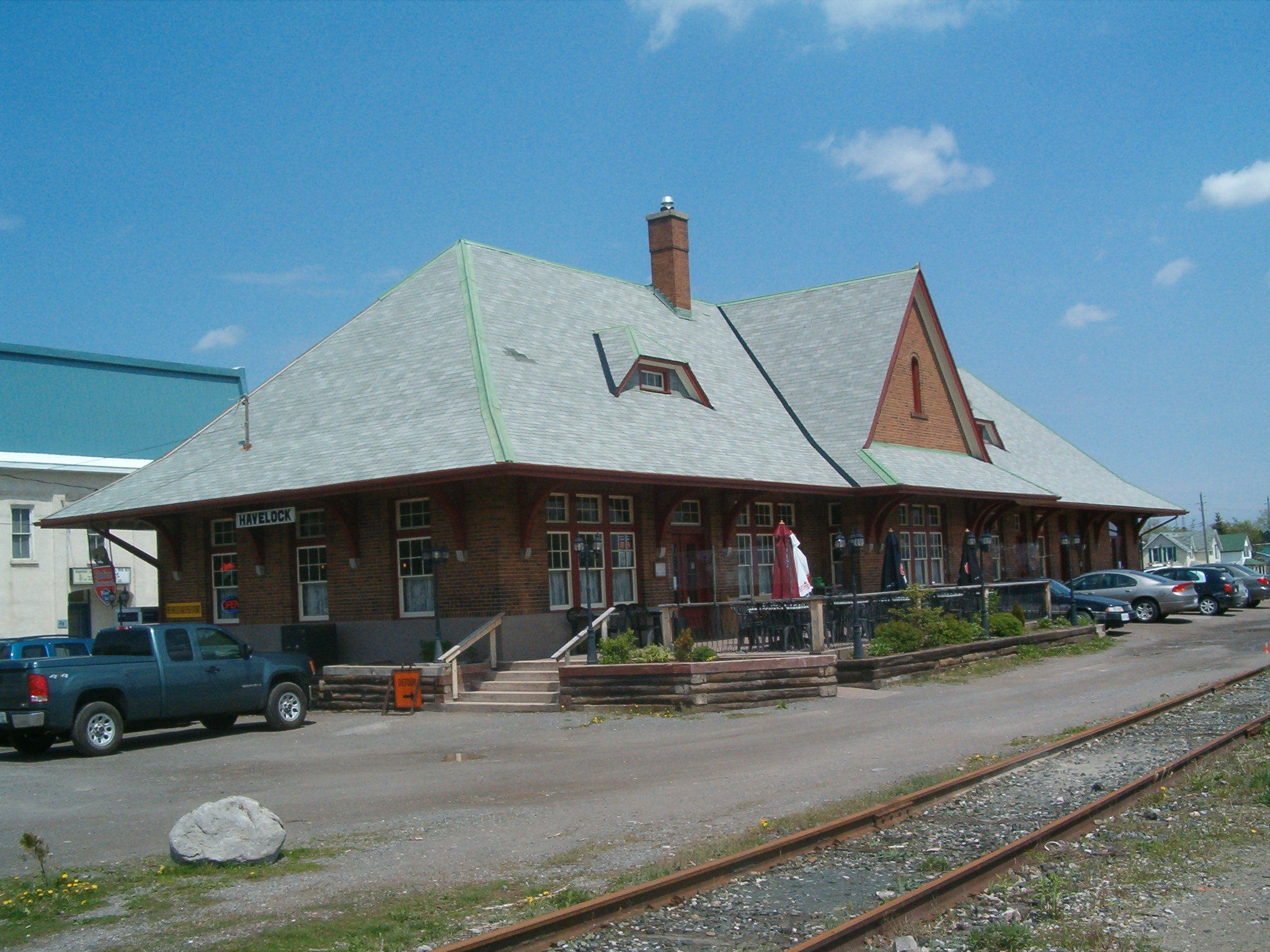
Railway station in Havelock

Later, in the nineteenth century and continuing to the present, mining became an important economic activity. Early businesses in Havelock included a post office, bakery, and a blacksmith were located south of the current village on high ground at the intersection of County Road 30 and Old Norwood Road. In 1881, the Canadian Pacific Railway surveyed a right-of-way through the area north of Havelock and a year later laid rails and surveyed and filled the swampy land to make room for a larger village. The current village of Havelock was developed on the filled land by the tracks north of the former village site and was incorporated in 1892. In the fall of 1884, the first full passenger train stopped at Havelock, from Toronto on its way to Smith's Falls. In 1961, the Havelock branch of the Toronto-Dominian Bank was robbed, in what was described by the Toronto Star in 2021 as "one of the biggest bank robberies in Canadian history."

Havelock was an important freight depot from the 1880s to the 1960s. The railway is now run by Canadian Pacific as Kawartha Lakes Railway and its activity today consists of transporting nepheline syenite and crushed basalt rock from two mines north of Havelock operated by Unimin.

In 1998, the village of Havelock was amalgamated with the township of Belmont-Methuen to form the current township of Havelock-Belmont-Methuen.

=== Historic School ===
The old school, a two-story building now known as the Hilltop Apartments, stands at the northwest corner of Oak Street and Mathison Street, Havelock. In 1890 to 1963 Havelock area students attended this school which in 1937 was renamed Havelock High School. In 1952 Havelock High School students were transferred to the new Norwood District High School in the neighbouring town of Norwood, Ontario. In 1963 Havelock Public School students were transferred to the new Havelock Public School, east of the Havelock Community Centre. In 1963 the school building was sold and converted to apartments. In September, 2005 the Havelock High School Reunion Committee placed in front of the apartments a commemorative plaque bolted to a large red granite stone from a local quarry.

=== Railway Station ===
The Canadian Pacific Railway (CPR) station on Ottawa Street (Hwy #7) in Havelock was built in 1929. It was designated in 1991 as a Heritage Railway Station by the Historic Sights and Monuments Board, Parks Canada. In 2004 the Station was purchased and renovated to accommodate restaurants.

== Communities ==
The township comprises the communities of:

- Ashby Mill
- Belmont Lake
- Blairton (ghost town)
- Blairton Station
- Blue Mountain
- Chase Corners
- Cordova Mines
- Freeman Corners
- Jack Lake
- Havelock
- Kasshabog Lake
- MacDonald Bay
- Nephton (ghost town)
- Oak Lake
- Preneveau
- Rockdale
- Round Lake
- Rush Point
- Vansickle

Havelock is the site of an annual country music festival, the Havelock Country Jamboree, in August, which celebrated its 30th anniversary in the summer of 2019.

== Demographics ==
In the 2021 Census of Population conducted by Statistics Canada, Havelock-Belmont-Methuen had a population of 5,083 living in 2,234 of its 3,856 total private dwellings, a change of 12.2% from its 2016 population of 4,530. With a land area of 529.35 km^{2} (204.38 sq mi), it had a population density of 9.6/km^{2} (24.9/sq mi) in 2021.

Canada census – Havelock-Belmont-Methuen community profile

	2021	2016	2011
Population	5,083 (+12.2% from 2016)	4,530 (+0.2% from 2011)	4,523 (-2.5% from 2006)
Land area	529.35 km^{2} (204.38 sq mi)	542.73 km^{2} (209.55 sq mi)	543.59 km^{2} (209.88 sq mi)
Population density	9.6/km^{2} (25/sq mi)	8.3/km^{2} (21/sq mi)	8.3/km^{2} (21/sq mi)
Median age	54.4 (M: 54.4, F: 54.8)	54.4 (M: 54.1, F: 54.7)
Private dwellings	3,856 (total) 2,234 (occupied)	3,936 (total)	3,747 (total)
Median household income	$71,000	$54,571

References: 2021 2016 2011

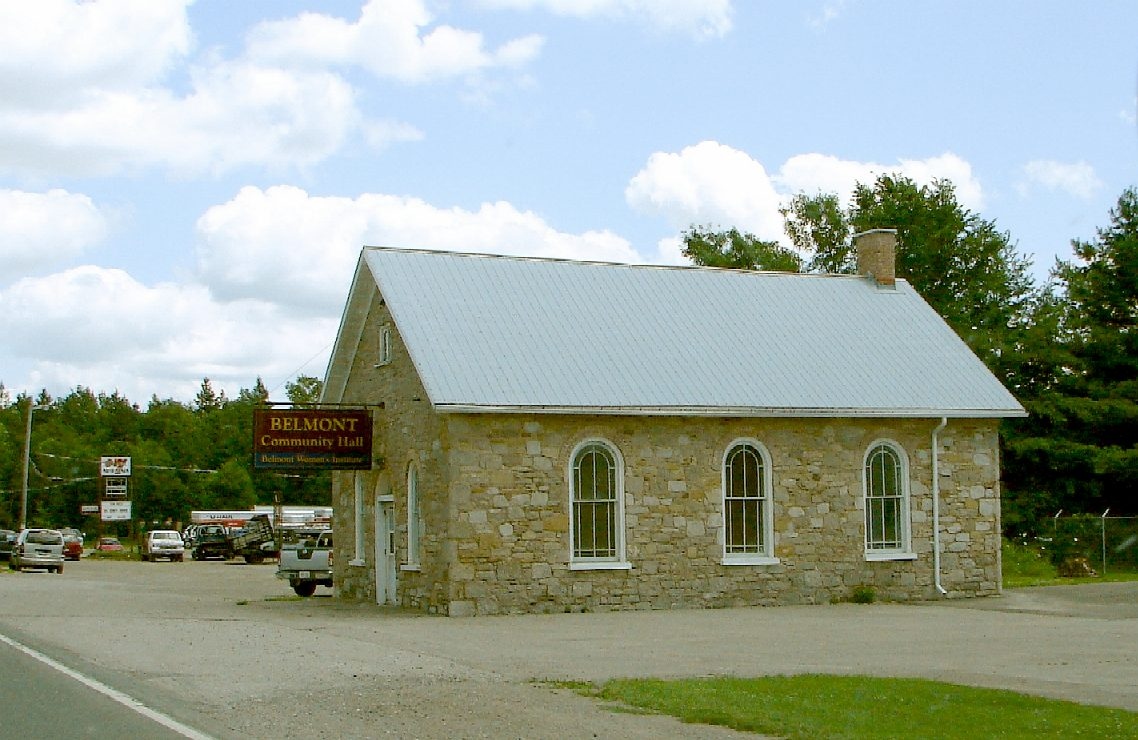
Belmont

Historical census populations – Havelock-Belmont-Methuen
Year	Pop.	±%
1996	4,327	—
2001	4,479	+3.5%
2006	4,637	+3.5%
2011	4,523	−2.5%
2016	4,530	+0.2%
2021	5,083	+12.2%
Population counts are not adjusted for boundary changes. Source: Statistics Canada

Mother tongue (2021):

- English as first language: 94.9%
- French as first language: 0.8%
- English and French as first language: 2.0%
- Other as first language: 3.6%

== Local Government ==
The town's council includes a Mayor, Deputy Mayor, and three Councillors elected on the basis of one per ward. One other representative is elected to join the mayor at meetings of Peterborough County Council. The members of council elected in 2022 are:

- Mayor: Jim Martin
- Deputy Mayor: Hart Webb
- Councillors:
  - At Large: Kathy Clement
  - Township Ward: Jerry Doherty
  - Village Ward: Beverly Flagler

== See also ==
- List of townships in Ontario
