= List of lakes of Ontario: C =

This is a list of lakes of Ontario beginning with the letter C.

== Cab–Cam ==
- Cab Lake
- Caba Lake
- Cabin Lake (Raimbault Township, Algoma District)
- Cabin Lake (Rawlinson Creek, Kenora District)
- Cabin Lake (Joynt Township, Thunder Bay District)
- Cabin Lake (Sturgeon River, Kenora District)
- Cabin Lake (Kawartha Lakes)
- Cabin Lake (Lurch River, Thunder Bay District)
- Cabin Lake (Cochrane District)
- Cabin Lake (St. Ignace Island, Thunder Bay District)
- Cabin Lake (Wawa)
- Cable Lake (Thunder Bay District)
- Cable Lake (Kenora District)
- Caboose Lake
- Cabot Lake
- Cache Lake (Sudbury District)
- Cache Lake (Rainy River District)
- Cache Lake (Lecours Township, Thunder Bay District)
- Cache Lake (Canisbay Township, Nipissing District)
- Cache Lake (West Nipissing)
- Cache Lake (Kenora District)
- Cache Lake (Lookout River, Thunder Bay District)
- Cache Lake (McLeod Lake, Thunder Bay District)
- Cachege Lake
- Cadawaja Lake
- Cadden Lake (Parry Sound District)
- Cadden Lake (Sudbury District)
- Caddy Lake
- Cadman Lake
- Cadre Lake
- Caesar Lake
- Cahill Lake
- Caibaiosai Lake
- Cain Lake (Caribou River, Rainy River District)
- Cain Lake (Oriana Lake, Rainy River District)
- Cain Lake (Muskoka District)
- Cairn Lake
- Cairngorm Lake
- Cairo Lake
- Caithness Lake
- Cal Lake
- Calabogie Lake
- Calais Lake
- Calamity Lake
- Calbeck Lake
- Calcite Lake (Thunder Bay District)
- Calcite Lake (Timiskaming District)
- Calder Lake (Rainy River District)
- Calder Lake (Kenora District)
- Caldwell Lake (Rainy River District)
- Caldwell Lake (Thunder Bay District)
- Caldwell Lake (Lanark County)
- Caledon Lake
- Caley Lake
- Calf Lake (Sudbury District)
- Calf Lake (Kenora District)
- Calhoun Lake
- Caliper Lake
- Call Lake
- Calladine Lake
- Callaghan Lake (Renfrew County)
- Callaghan Lake (Rainy River District)
- Callahan Lake
- Callery Lake
- Callinan Lake
- Calm Lake (Rainy River District)
- Calm Lake (Nipissing District)
- Calong Lake
- Calpin Lake
- Calstock Lake
- Calumet Lake
- Calverley's Pond
- Calvert Lake (Kenora District)
- Calvert Lake (Thunder Bay District)
- Calvert Lake (Cochrane District)
- Calvin Lake
- Cam Lake (Kenora District)
- Cam Lake (Sudbury District)
- Camden Lake
- Camel Lake (Frontenac County)
- Camel Lake (Muskoka District)
- Camel Lake (Sudbury District)
- Camel Lake (Thunder Bay District)
- Camel Lake (Rainy River District)
- Camel Read Lake
- Camelot Lake
- Cameo Lake
- Cameron Lake (Brudenell, Lyndoch and Raglan)
- Cameron Lake (Algoma District)
- Cameron Lake (Cameron Creek, Thunder Bay District)
- Cameron Lake (Cameron Creek, Kenora District)
- Cameron Lake (Sproule Township, Nipissing District)
- Cameron Lake (Umbach Township, Kenora District)
- Cameron Lake (Kawartha Lakes)
- Cameron Lake (Greater Sudbury)
- Cameron Lake (Eagle River, Thunder Bay District)
- Cameron Lake (Greater Madawaska)
- Cameron Lake (Nairn and Hyman)
- Cameron Lake (West Nipissing)
- Cameron Lake (Hardwick Township, Thunder Bay District)
- Cameron Lake (Bruce County)
- Camerons Lake
- Cameroon Lake
- Cammack Lake
- Camp 14 Lake
- Camp 36 Lake
- Camp Eleven Lake
- Camp Five Lake
- Camp Forty One Lake
- Camp Four Lake
- Camp Island Lake
- Camp Lake (Tagouche Creek, Thunder Bay District)
- Camp Lake (Gour Township, Kenora District)
- Camp Lake (Creelman Township, Sudbury District)
- Camp Lake (Greater Sudbury)
- Camp Lake (Muskoka District)
- Camp Lake (Haliburton County)
- Camp Lake (Hasson Lake, Thunder Bay District)
- Camp Lake (The North Shore)
- Camp Lake (Frechette Township, Sudbury District)
- Camp Lake (Haycock Township, Kenora District)
- Camp Lake (Huffman Township, Sudbury District)
- Camp Lake (Timmins)
- Camp Lake (Elliot Lake)
- Camp Lake (Houtari Township, Algoma District)
- Camp Lake (Munro Township, Cochrane District)
- Camp Lake (Frontenac County)
- Camp Lake (Kashabowie River, Thunder Bay District)
- Camp Lake (Nipissing District)
- Camp Lake (Shelley Township, Sudbury District)
- Camp Lake (Ivanhoe Township, Sudbury District)
- Camp Nine Lake (Nipissing District)
- Camp Nine Lake (Sudbury District)
- Camp One Lake
- Camp Seven Lake
- Camp Six Lake
- Camp Ten Lake
- Camp Three Lake
- Camp Two Lake (Sudbury District)
- Camp Two Lake (Rainy River District)
- Campbell Lake (Sanborn Township, Cochrane District)
- Campbell Lake (Nipissing District)
- Campbell Lake (St.-Charles)
- Campbell Lake (Rainy River District)
- Campbell Lake (Parry Sound District)
- Campbell Lake (Deans Township, Sudbury District)
- Campbell Lake (Clifford Township, Cochrane District)
- Campbell Lake (Halliday Township, Sudbury District)
- Campbell Lake (Lennox and Addington County)
- Campbell Lake (Campbell Creek, Thunder Bay District)
- Campbell Lake (Stover Township, Sudbury District)
- Campbell Lake (Goodfellow Township, Thunder Bay District)
- Campbellville Pond
- Campcot Lake (Thunder Bay District)
- Campcot Lake (Haliburton County)
- Camper Lake
- Campfire Lake (Kenora District)
- Campfire Lake (Thunder Bay District)
- Campground Lake
- Camphouse Lake
- Camping Lake
- Campover Lake
- Camproad Lake
- Campstool Lake
- Camptwo Lake
- Campus Lake
- Camrose Lake

== Can–Cay ==
- Can Lake
- Can Opener Lake
- Canada Jay Lake
- Canadensis Lake
- Canal Lake (Kawartha Lakes)
- Canal Lake (Rainy River District)
- Canard Lake
- Canary Lake
- Cancer Lake
- Candide Lake
- Candle Lake
- Candler Lake
- Candybar Lake
- Cane Lake
- Canis Lake
- Canisbay Lake
- Canister Lake
- Canna Lake
- Cannibal Lake
- Canniff Lake
- Canning Lake (Parry Sound District)
- Canning Lake (Haliburton County)
- Cannon Lake (Porcus Lake, Kenora District)
- Cannon Lake (Gitche River, Kenora District)
- Cannon Lake (Hastings County)
- Cannon Lake (Thunder Bay District)
- Canoe Lake (Barnard Creek), in northwest Thunder Bay District
- Canoe Lake (The North Shore), in Algoma District
- Canoe Lake (Greater Madawaska), in Renfrew County
- Canoe Lake (Parry Sound District)
- Canoe Lake (Kenora District)
- Canoe Lake (Frontenac County)
- Canoe Lake (Sudbury District)
- Canoe Lake (Lennox and Addington County)
- Canoe Lake (Timiskaming District)
- Canoe Lake (Scarfe Township), in Algoma District
- Canoe Lake (Nipissing District)
- Canoe Lake (Madawaska Valley), in Renfrew County
- Canoe Lake (Syine Township), in geographic Syine Township, Thunder Bay District
- Canoeshed Lake
- Canon Lake (Tamarack Lake, Thunder Bay District)
- Canon Lake (GTP Block 7 Township, Thunder Bay District)
- Canonto Lake
- Canterbury Lake
- Canthook Lake (Hoey Township, Sudbury District)
- Canthook Lake (Ellis Township, Sudbury District)
- Canthook Lake (Thunder Bay District)
- Cantin Lake (Algoma District)
- Cantin Lake (Cochrane District)
- Cantin Lake (Parry Sound District)
- Cantley Lake
- Canton Lake
- Cantrill Lake
- Canty Lake
- Canvasback Lake
- Canyon Lake (Kenora District)
- Canyon Lake (Sudbury District)
- Canyon Lake (Timiskaming District)
- Canyon Lake (Rainy River District)
- Canyon Lake (Algoma District)
- Cap Lake (Sudbury District)
- Cap Lake (Nipissing District)
- Capee Lake
- Capella Lake
- Capin Lake
- Capper Lake
- Capre Lake
- Capricornus Lake
- Capsell Lake
- Captain Lake
- Captain Tom Lake
- Captains Lake
- Capton Lake
- Caput Lake
- Car Lake (Rainy River District)
- Car Lake (Timiskaming District)
- Car Lake (Kenora District)
- Carafel Lake
- Caragana Lake
- Caramat Lake
- Carcajou Lake
- Carcass Lake
- Card Lake (Hastings County)
- Card Lake (Kenora District)
- Carder Lake
- Cardiff Lake
- Cardinal Lake
- Cardinalis Lake
- Cards Lake
- Cardwell Lake
- Carew Lake
- Carey Lake
- Carfrae Lake
- Cargill Lake
- Cargill Mill Pond
- Cariad Lake
- Carib Lake
- Cariboo Lake
- Caribou Lake (Smellie Township, Kenora District)
- Caribou Lake (Plummer Additional)
- Caribou Lake (Cache Creek, Kenora District)
- Caribou Lake (Juillette Township, Blind River)
- Caribou Lake (Cochrane District)
- Caribou Lake (Willow River, Thunder Bay District)
- Caribou Lake (North Bay)
- Caribou Lake (Bent Creek, Kenora District)
- Caribou Lake (Pickerel Lake, Kenora District)
- Caribou Lake (Timmermans Township, Blind River)
- Caribou Lake (Boys Township, Kenora District)
- Caribou Lake (Lehman Township, Algoma District)
- Caribou Lake (Shuniah)
- Caribou Lake (Abraham Township, Algoma District)
- Caribou Lake (Sudbury District)
- Caribou Lake (Caribou River, Thunder Bay District)
- Caribou Lake (Simpson Island, Thunder Bay District)
- Caribou Lake (Temagami)
- Caribou Lake (Duncan Township, Algoma District)
- Caribou Throat Lake
- Caribus Lake
- Carillon Lake
- Carkner Lake
- Carl Lake (Algoma District)
- Carl Lake (Sudbury District)
- Carl Lake (Brothers Township, Thunder Bay District)
- Carl Lake (Kawashkagama River, Thunder Bay District)
- Carl Wilson Lake
- Carlbom Lake
- Carleton Lake
- Carling Lake (Kenora District)
- Carling Lake (Cochrane District)
- Carlisle Pond
- Carlo Lake
- Carlotta Lake
- Carlson Lake (Cochrane District)
- Carlson Lake (Thunder Bay District)
- Carlton Lake
- Carlyle Lake (Cochrane District)
- Carlyle Lake (Sudbury District)
- Carman Lake (Cochrane District)
- Carman Lake (Algoma District)
- Carmen Lake (Parry Sound District)
- Carmen Lake (Sudbury District)
- Carmen Lake (Timiskaming District)
- Carmichael Lake (Kenora District)
- Carmichael Lake (Cochrane District)
- Carmichael Lake (Sudbury District)
- Carnahan Lake
- Carney Lake
- Carnilac Lake
- Caro Lake
- Carol Lake
- Caroline Lake
- Caron Lake (Kenora District)
- Caron Lake (Thunder Bay District)
- Carp Lake (Algoma District)
- Carp Lake (Kawartha Lakes)
- Carp Lake (Rainy River District)
- Carpenter Lake (Nipissing District)
- Carpenter Lake (Kenora District)
- Carpenter Lake (Morin Township, Algoma District)
- Carpenter Lake (Tronsen Township, Algoma District)
- Carpet Lake
- Carre Lake
- Carrick Lake
- Carrie Lake
- Carriere Lake
- Carrigan Lake
- Carrington Lake
- Carroll Lake (Kenora District)
- Carroll Lake (Lennox and Addington County)
- Carrot Lake
- Carruthers Lake
- Carry Lake
- Carrying Lake
- Carscallen Lake
- Carson Lake (Bruce County)
- Carson Lake (Algoma District)
- Carson Lake (Thunder Bay District)
- Carson Lake (Renfrew County)
- Carson Lake (Hastings County)
- Carson Lake (Parry Sound District)
- Carstens Lake
- Carswell Lake
- Cart Lake
- Cartan Lake
- Carter Lake (Renfrew County)
- Carter Lake (Parry Sound District)
- Carter Lake (Manitoulin District)
- Carter Lake (Algoma District)
- Carter Lake (Kenora District)
- Cartier Lake (Sudbury District)
- Cartier Lake (Renfrew County)
- Carty Lake
- Carver Lake
- Cascade Lake (Lamport Township, Thunder Bay District)
- Cascade Lake (Cascade River, Thunder Bay District)
- Cascaden Lake
- Cascanette Lake
- Casey Lake (Nipissing District)
- Casey Lake (Ottawa)
- Casgrain Lake
- Cashel Lake (Hastings County)
- Cashel Lake (Nipissing District)
- Cashen Lake (Parry Sound District)
- Cashen Lake (Algoma District)
- Casino Lake
- Cask Lake
- Caskill Lake
- Casper Lake
- Casque Lake
- Cass Lake
- Cassadaga Lake
- Casselman's Lake
- Cassels Lake
- Cassidy Lake (Muskoka District)
- Cassidy Lake (Algoma District)
- Casson Lake
- Castellar Lake
- Castle Lake (Castle Creek, Thunder Bay District)
- Castle Lake (Hardwick Township, Thunder Bay District)
- Castlebar Lake
- Castleman Lake
- Castlewood Lake
- Castor Lake (Eldorado Creek, Kenora District)
- Castor Lake (Eyapamikama Lake (Kenora District)
- Castor Lake (Nipissing District)
- Castor Lake (Thunder Bay District)
- Castor Ponds
- Castoroil Lake
- Castra Lake
- Casummit Lake
- Caswell Lake (Greater Sudbury)
- Caswell Lake (Sudbury District)
- Caswell Lake (Timiskaming District)
- Cat Lake (Nipissing District)
- Cat Lake (Roosevelt Township, Sudbury District)
- Cat Lake (Parry Sound District)
- Cat Lake (Algoma District)
- Cat Lake (Umbach Township, Kenora District)
- Cat Lake (Haliburton County)
- Cat Lake (Cavell Township, Sudbury District)
- Cat Lake (Cat River, Kenora District)
- Cat Lake (Killarney)
- Cataract Lake
- Catastrophe Lake
- Catawba Lake
- Catchacoma Lake
- Catcher Lake
- Caterpillar Lake (Kenora District)
- Caterpillar Lake (Rainy River District)
- Catfish Lake (Nipissing District)
- Catfish Lake (Algoma District)
- Catfish Lake (Parry Sound District)
- Catharine Lake
- Catherine Lake (Thunder Bay District)
- Catherine Lake (Kenora District)
- Cathrine Lake
- Cathro Lake
- Cathy's Lake
- Catlonite Lake
- Cattral Lake
- Cauchon Lake
- Caufield Lake
- Cauley Lake
- Cauliflower Lake
- Caulkin Lake
- Caution Lake
- Cavalary Lake
- Cavanagh Lake
- Cavano Lake
- Lac la Cave
- Cave Lake (Manitoulin District)
- Cave Lake (Sudbury District)
- Cavell Lake (Thunder Bay District)
- Cavell Lake (Sudbury District)
- Cavendish Lake
- Cavern Lake
- Cavers Lake (Yesno Township, Thunder Bay District)
- Cavers Lake (Cavers Creek, Thunder Bay District)
- Caviar Lake
- Cawanogami Lake
- Cawdron Lake
- Cawing Lake
- Cawston Lakes
- Caya's Lake
- Cayer Lake
- Caysee Lake
- Cayuga Lake

== Ceb–Cec ==
- Cebush Lake
- Lake Cecebe
- Cecil Lake (Kenora District)
- Cecil Lake (Haliburton County)
- Cecil Lake (Thunder Bay District)
- Cecil Lake (Timiskaming District)
- Cecil Lake (Rainy River District)
- Cecile Lake (Invergarry Township, Sudbury District)
- Cecile Lake (McNaught Township, Sudbury District)
- Cecile Lake (Thunder Bay District)

== Ced–Cer ==
- Cedar Lake (Loughborough Township, South Frontenac)
- Cedar Lake (Algoma District)
- Cedar Lake (Pittsburgh Township, South Frontenac)
- Cedar Lake (Manitoulin District)
- Cedar Lake (Brothers Township, Thunder Bay District)
- Cedar Lake (Nipissing District)
- Cedar Lake (Haliburton County)
- Cedar Lake (Barrie Township, North Frontenac)
- Cedar Lake (Greenstone)
- Cedar Lake (Michipicoten Island, Thunder Bay District)
- Cedar Lake (South Canonto Township, North Frontenac)
- Cedar Lake (Sudbury District)
- Cedar Lake (Hastings County)
- Cedar Lake (Central Frontenac)
- Cedar Lake (Tuuri Township, Thunder Bay District)
- Cedar Lake (Kenora District)
- Cedar Lake (Renfrew County)
- Cedar Lake (Rainy River District)
- Cedar Lakes
- Cedarbough Lake
- Cedarclump Lake
- Cedargum Lake
- Cedarlimb Lake
- Cedarskirt Lake
- Cedartree Lake
- Cedric Lake (Thunder Bay District)
- Cedric Lake (Sudbury District)
- Ceepee Lake
- Celastrus Lake
- Cellist Lake
- Celt Lake
- Celtis Lake
- Cemetery Lake (Sudbury District)
- Cemetery Lake (Kenora District)
- Centennial Lake (Renfrew County)
- Centennial Lake (Algoma District)
- Center Lake
- Central Lake
- Centralis Lake
- Centre Lake (Algoma District)
- Centre Lake (Stobie Township, Sudbury District)
- Centre Lake (Leeds and Grenville United Counties)
- Centre Lake (Thunder Bay District)
- Centre Lake (Abbey Township, Sudbury District)
- Centre Lake (Renfrew County)
- Centre Lake (Haliburton County)
- Centre Triple Lake
- Centrefire Lake
- Centreville Pond
- Ceph Lake
- Ceres Lake
- Cerulean Lake
- Cerullo Lake

== Chab–Cham ==
- Chabbie Lake
- Chabot Lake
- Chadwick Lake
- Chagma Lake
- Chagnon Lake
- Chaillon Lake
- Chain Lake (Killarney)
- Chain Lake (Yeo Township, Sudbury District)
- Chain Lake (Muskoka District)
- Chain Lake (Algoma District)
- Chain Lakes (Norberg Township, Algoma District)
- Chain Lakes (White River)
- Chain Lakes (Thunder Bay District)
- Chain Lakes (Parry Sound District)
- Chain Lakes (Frontenac County)
- Chain Lakes (Hastings County)
- Chain of Lakes (Sudbury District)
- Chain of Lakes (Thunder Bay District)
- Chainy Lake
- Chair Lake
- Chalet Lake
- Chalice Lake
- Chalk Lake
- Challener Lake
- Challis Lake
- Chalmers Lake
- Chamandy Lake
- Chamber Lake
- Chamberlain Lake
- Chambers Lake (Sudbury District)
- Chambers Lake (Nipissing District)
- Chambers Lake (Thunder Bay District)
- Chambers Lake (Frontenac County)
- Champagne Lake
- Champlain Trail Lakes

== Chan–Chap ==
- Chance Lake (Timiskaming District)
- Chance Lake (Thunder Bay District)
- Chancellor Lake
- Chandos Lake
- Change Lake
- Chanley Lake
- Channel Lake
- Channel Lakes
- Channing Lake
- Chant Plain Lake
- Chapeskis Lake
- Chapleau Lake
- Chaplin Lake
- Chapman Lake (Thunder Bay District)
- Chapman Lake (Cochrane District)
- Chappais Lake
- Chappelle Lake
- Chappie Lake
- Chappy Lake

== Char–Chay ==
- Chara Lake
- Charcoal Lake (Haliburton County)
- Charcoal Lake (Sudbury District)
- Lac Charette
- Charette Lake
- Charity Lake (Thunder Bay District)
- Charity Lake (Timiskaming District)
- Charland Lake
- Charlebois Lake (Renfrew County)
- Charlebois Lake (Cochrane District)
- Lake Charles (Grey County)
- Lake Charles (Kenora District)
- Charles Lake (Frontenac County)
- Charles Lake (Nipissing District)
- Charles Lake (Haliburton County)
- Charles Lake (Sudbury District)
- Charleston Lake
- Charlewood Lake
- Charley Lake (Nipissing District)
- Charley Lake (Algoma District)
- Charlie Lake (Nipissing District)
- Charlie Lake (Elliot Lake)
- Charlie Lake (Renfrew County)
- Charlie Lake (Peever Township, Algoma District)
- Charlie May's Lake
- Charlie's Lake
- Charlies Lake (Frontenac County)
- Charlies Lake (Algoma District)
- Charlotte Lake (Renfrew County)
- Charlotte Lake (Algoma District)
- Charlotte Lake (Timiskaming District)
- Charlotte Lake (Thunder Bay District)
- Charlton Lake (Curtin Township, Sudbury District)
- Charlton Lake (Windego Township, Sudbury District)
- Charnock Lake
- Charon Lake
- Charr Lake
- Charred Lake
- Charron Lake
- Chartier Lake
- Chartrand Lake (Algoma District)
- Chartrand Lake (Sudbury District)
- Chartrand Lake (Cochrane District)
- Chartrand Lake (Kenora District)
- Chas Lake
- Chase Lake (Rainy River District)
- Chase Lake (Kenora District)
- Chat Lake
- Chateau Lake
- Chatham Lake
- Chathams Lake
- Lac des Chats
- Chatson Lake
- Chattahoochee Lake
- Chattersons Pond
- Chatterton Lake
- Chaucer Lake
- Chaulk Lake
- Lac Chauvin
- Chaval Lake
- Chaya Pond

== Che ==
- Chebogomog Lake
- Chebucto Lake
- Checklin Lake
- Checkmark Lake
- Cheddar Lake
- Cheer Lake
- Cheesehead Lake
- Cheeseman Lake
- Chela Lake
- Chellew Lake
- Chelsea Lake
- Chemong Lake
- Chemung Lake
- Chene Lake
- Cheney Lake (Algoma District)
- Cheney Lake (Lanark County)
- Chenier Lake
- Chepahyee Sahkaheekahn/Onepine Lake
- Chequer Lake
- Lac Cherie
- Cherniuk Lake
- Cherrington Lake
- Cherry Lake (Peterborough County)
- Cherry Lake (Algoma District)
- Cherry Lake (Kenora District)
- Cherry Lake (Cochrane District)
- Cherry Lake (Rainy River District)
- Chesakan Lake
- Chesley Lake
- Chester Lake
- Chevalier Lake
- Chewink Lake (Nipissing District)
- Chewink Lake (Sudbury District)

== Chia–Chim ==
- Chiah Lake
- Chibiabos Lake
- Chiblow Lake
- Chicault Lake
- Chick Lake (Nipissing District)
- Chick Lake (Umbel Lake, Kenora District)
- Chick Lake (Sellen Lake, Kenora District)
- Chickadee Lake (Thunder Bay District)
- Chickadee Lake (Sudbury District)
- Chickaree Lake
- Chicken Farm Lake
- Chicobi Lake
- Chicot Lake
- Chief Lake (Thunder Bay District)
- Chief Lake (Timiskaming District)
- Chief Lake (Sudbury District)
- Chief Peter Lake
- Chief Tonene Lake
- Chiki Lake
- Chilcott Lake
- Childerhose Lake
- Chill Lake
- Chilton Lake
- Chime Lake

== Chin–Chl ==
- Chin Lake (Cochrane District)
- Chin Lake (Algoma District)
- China Lake
- Chiniguchi Lake
- Chip Lake (Algoma District)
- Chip Lake (Hastings County)
- Chipai Lake
- Chipchase Lake
- Lake Chipican
- Chipman Lake (Thunder Bay District)
- Chipman Lake (Algoma District)
- Chipmunk Lake (Kenora District)
- Chipmunk Lake (Nipissing District)
- Chipmunk Lake (Thunder Bay District)
- Chippego Lake
- Chippy Lake
- Chiroptera Lake
- Chisamore Lake
- Chit Lake
- Chivelston Lake
- Chlorus Lake

== Cho–Chu ==
- Chokecherry Lake
- Chokio Lake
- Cholette Lake
- Chopin Lake
- Chopper Lake
- Chord Lake
- Chorus Lake
- Chota Lake
- Chouinard Lake
- Chowder Lake
- Chown Lake
- Chris Lake
- Chris Willis Lake
- Chriselle Lake
- Christianson Lake
- Christie Lake (Frontenac County)
- Christie Lake (Algoma District)
- Christie Lake (Lanark County)
- Christie Lake (Thunder Bay District)
- Christie Lake (Parry Sound District)
- Christie Lake (Nipissing District)
- Christie Lake (Cochrane District)
- Christie Reservoir
- Christina Lake
- Christman Lake
- Christmas Lake
- Christopher Robin Lake
- Christy Lake
- Chrome Lake
- Chrysler Lake
- Chub Lake (Lake of Bays)
- Chub Lake (Huntsville)
- Chub Lake (Jarvis Township, Algoma District)
- Chub Lake (Rainy River District)
- Chub Lake (Gould Township, Algoma District)
- Chubb Lake (Hastings County)
- Chubb Lake (Algoma District)
- Chuck Lake
- Chuggin Lake
- Chummy Lake
- Church Lake (Timiskaming District)
- Church Lake (Squeers Lake, Thunder Bay District)
- Church Lake (Peterborough County)
- Church Lake (Church Township, Thunder Bay District)
- Church Lake (Algoma District)
- Church Lake (Kenora District)
- Churchill Lake
- Chute Lake

== Ci ==
- Cibber Lake
- Cigar Lake (Cochrane District)
- Cigar Lake (Thunder Bay District)
- Cinder Lake (Algoma District)
- Cinder Lake (Haliburton County)
- Cinder Lake (Thunder Bay District)
- Cinderella Lake
- Cinders Lake
- Cinqisle Lake
- Circle Lake (Parry Sound District)
- Circle Lake (Nipissing District)
- Circle Lake (Thunder Bay District)
- Circle Lake (Sudbury District)
- Circle Lake (Cochrane District)
- Circlet Lake
- Circular Lake
- Cirrus Lake (Rainy River District)
- Cirrus Lake (Thunder Bay District)
- Citellus Lake

== Cla ==
- Clace Lake
- Claim Lake (Sudbury District)
- Claim Lake (Algoma District)
- Lac Clair
- Clair Lake (Waterloo Region)
- Clair Lake (Rainy River District)
- Claire Lake (Algoma District)
- Claire Lake (Cochrane District)
- Claire Lake (Thunder Bay District)
- Claireville Reservoir
- Clam Lake (Parry Sound District)
- Clam Lake (Chester Township, Sudbury District)
- Clam Lake (Burwash Township, Sudbury District)
- Clam Lake (Bruce County)
- Clam Ponds
- Clamp Lake
- Clamshell Lake (Kenora District)
- Clamshell Lake (Nipissing District)
- Clancy Lake
- Clanricarde Lake
- Clapper Lake
- Clara Belle Lake
- Clara Lake (Nipissing District)
- Clara Lake (Renfrew County)
- Clara Lake (Algoma District)
- Claradeer Lake
- Clare Lake
- Claribel Lake
- Clarice Lake
- Clarinet Lake
- Clarity Lake
- Clark Lake (Cochrane District)
- Clark Lake (Muskoka District)
- Clark Lake (Sudbury District)
- Clark Lake (Hastings County)
- Clark Pond
- Clarke Lake (Timiskaming District)
- Clarke Lake (Nipissing District)
- Clarke Lake (Sudbury District)
- Clarke's Lake
- Clarkson Lake (Sudbury District)
- Clarkson Lake (Kenora District)
- Claude Lake
- Claus Lake (Sudbury District)
- Claus Lake (Thunder Bay District)
- Clavelle Lake
- Claw Lake (Cochrane District)
- Claw Lake (Singing River, Thunder Bay District)
- Claw Lake (Claw Creek, Thunder Bay District)
- Claw Lake (Sudbury District)
- Claw Lake (Kenora District)
- Clay Lake (Algoma District)
- Clay Lake (Greenwood River, Thunder Bay District)
- Clay Lake (Kenora District)
- Clay Lake (Atikameg Township, Thunder Bay District)
- Clay Lake (Lanark County)
- Clay Lake (Cochrane District)
- Clay Lake (GTP Block 6 Township, Thunder Bay District)
- Clay Lake (Flood Township, Thunder Bay District)
- Claypack Lake
- Clayton Lake (Rainy River District)
- Clayton Lake (Algoma District)
- Clayton Lake (Haliburton County)
- Clayton Lake (Lanark County)
- Clayton Lake (Timiskaming District)

== Cle–Cli ==
- Clean Lake
- Lake Clear
- Clear Lake (Muskoka Lakes)
- Clear Lake (Ritchie Township, Cochrane District)
- Clear Lake (Bruce County)
- Clear Lake (Frontenac County)
- Clear Lake (Thunder Bay District)
- Clear Lake (Laurentian Hills)
- Clear Lake (Espanola)
- Clear Lake (Spanish)
- Clear Lake (Leeds and Grenville United Counties)
- Clear Lake (Wilson Township, Parry Sound District)
- Clear Lake (Algonquin Highlands)
- Clear Lake (Nansen Township, Cochrane District)
- Clear Lake (McKellar)
- Clear Lake (O'Brien Township, Cochrane District)
- Clear Lake (Bayly Township, Timiskaming District)
- Clear Lake (Laurentian Valley)
- Clear Lake (Minden Hills)
- Clear Lake (Perry)
- Clear Lake (Hess Township, Sudbury District)
- Clear Lake (Lac Seul 28)
- Clear Lake (Coleman)
- Clear Lake (Timmins)
- Clear Lake (The Archipelago)
- Clear Lake (Bracebridge)
- Clear Lake (Huron Shores)
- Clear Lake (Axe River, Kenora District)
- Clear Lake (Tay Valley)
- Clear Lake (Lanark Highlands)
- Clear Lake (Greater Sudbury)
- Clear Lake (Big Canon Lake, Kenora District)
- Clear Lake (Peterborough County)
- Clear Lake (Kawartha Lakes)
- Clear Lake (East Mills Township, Parry Sound District)
- Clear Lake (Foley Township, Seguin)
- Clear Lake (Patterson Township, Parry Sound District)
- Clear Lake (Nipissing District)
- Clear Lake (Oslo Lake, Kenora District)
- Clear Lake (Burton Township, Whitestone)
- Clear Lake (Hagerman Township, Whitestone)
- Clear Lake (Nettleton Township, Cochrane District)
- Clear Lake (Kirkup Township, Kenora District)
- Clear Lake (Killarney)
- Clear Lake (Humphrey Township, Seguin)
- Clear Lakes
- Clearall Lake
- Clearaqua Lake
- Clearbed Lake
- Clearsilver Lake
- Clearview Lake (Nipissing District)
- Clearview Lake (Algoma District)
- Clearwater Lake (Badwater Creek, Thunder Bay District)
- Clearwater Lake (Kenora District)
- Clearwater Lake (Timiskaming District)
- Clearwater Lake (Common Township, Algoma District)
- Clearwater Lake (Gravenhurst)
- Clearwater Lake (Frontenac County)
- Clearwater Lake (Nipissing District)
- Clearwater Lake (Huntsville)
- Clearwater Lake (Cochrane District)
- Clearwater Lake (Sudbury District)
- Clearwater Lake (Laberge Township, Thunder Bay District)
- Clearwater Lake (GTP Block 2 Township, Thunder Bay District)
- Clearwater Lake (Jarvis Township, Algoma District)
- Clearwater Pond
- Clearwater West Lake
- Cleary Lake
- Cleaver Lake (Timiskaming District)
- Cleaver Lake (Thunder Bay District)
- Cleftrock Lake
- Clegge Lake
- Cleland Lake
- Clem Lake
- Clement Lake (Sudbury District)
- Clement Lake (Haliburton County)
- Clement Lake (Renfrew County)
- Clement Lake (Rainy River District)
- Clements Lake
- Clemmens Lake
- Clemow Lake
- Clerc Lake
- Clermont Lake
- Cleveland Lake (Kenora District)
- Cleveland Lake (Sudbury District)
- Clevis Lake
- Cliff Lake (Corbriere Township, Algoma District)
- Cliff Lake (Renfrew County)
- Cliff Lake (Pettypiece Township, Kenora District)
- Cliff Lake (Nipissing District)
- Cliff Lake (McGaw Creek, Thunder Bay District)
- Cliff Lake (Pikitigushi River, Thunder Bay District)
- Cliff Lake (Mystery Lake, Kenora District)
- Cliff Lake (Lane Township, Algoma District)
- Clifford Lake
- Cliffside Lake
- Clifftay Lake
- Clifton Lake
- Cline Lake
- Clinto Lake
- Clist Lake

== Clo–Cly ==
- Clod Lake
- Clodan Lake
- Cloister Lake
- Closs Lake (Algoma District)
- Closs Lake (Kenora District)
- Closs Lake (Renfrew County)
- Cloud Lake (Jay Creek, Thunder Bay District)
- Cloud Lake (Neebing)
- Cloud Lake (Nipissing District)
- Cloudlet Lake
- Cloudy Lake (Renfrew County)
- Cloudy Lake (Algoma District)
- Cloudy Lake (Peterborough County)
- Clouston Lake
- Clouthier Lake
- Cloutier Lake (Cochrane District)
- Cloutier Lake (Thunder Bay District)
- Clove Lake (Algoma District)
- Clove Lake (Thunder Bay District)
- Cloven Lake
- Clovenhoof Lake
- Clover Lake (Greenstone)
- Clover Lake (Nipissing District)
- Clover Lake (Esnagami Township, Thunder Bay District)
- Cloverleaf Lake
- Clow Lake
- Club House Pond
- Club Lake (Frontenac County)
- Club Lake (Thunder Bay District)
- Club Lake (Algoma District)
- Club Lake (Nipissing District)
- Clubbe Lake
- Clubhouse Lake
- Cluderay Lake
- Cluff Lake
- Cluster Lakes
- Clute Lake
- Clutes Lake
- Clyde Lake (Lanark County)
- Clyde Lake (Haliburton County)
- Clydegale Lake
- Clydesdale Lake

== Coa–Com ==
- Coag Lake
- Coat Lake
- Coate Lake
- Coates Lake
- Coathup Lake
- Cob Lake
- Cobalt Lake
- Cobb Lake
- Cobbett Lake
- Cobble Lake
- Cobham Lake
- Cobley Lake
- Cobourg Lake
- Cobre Lake
- Coburn Lake (Kawartha Lakes)
- Coburn Lake (Kenora District)
- Cochalgo Lake
- Cochenour Lake
- Cochram Lake
- Cochrane Lake (Sudbury District)
- Cochrane Lake (Cochrane District)
- Cochrane Lake (Parry Sound District)
- Cockaday Lake
- Cockburn Lake (Nipissing District)
- Cockburn Lake (Timiskaming District)
- Cockin Lake
- Cockle Lake
- Cocoa Lake
- Cocos Lake
- Cod Lake
- Code Lake
- Coe (Island) Lake
- Coe Lake
- Coffee Lake (Algoma District)
- Coffee Lake (Wilson Island, Thunder Bay District)
- Coffee Lake (Nipissing District)
- Coffee Lake (Carib Creek, Thunder Bay District)
- Coffey Lake (Hastings County)
- Coffey Lake (Thunder Bay District)
- Coghlan Lake
- Cognashene Lake
- Coin Lake (Lanark County)
- Coin Lake (Kenora District)
- Cola Lake
- Colborne Lake
- Colbourne Lake
- Colbran Lake
- Colby Lake
- Cold Lake (Peterborough County)
- Cold Lake (Rainy River District)
- Coldingham Lake
- Coldrey Lake
- Coldspring Lake
- Coldwater Lake (Michipicoten Island, Thunder Bay District)
- Coldwater Lake (Wardrope Township, Thunder Bay District)
- Coldwater Lake (Muskoka District)
- Coldwind Lake
- Cole Lake (Frontenac County)
- Cole Lake (Sioux Narrows-Nestor Falls)
- Cole Lake (Carling)
- Cole Lake (Blair Township, Parry Sound District)
- Cole Lake (MacFie Township, Kenora District)
- Cole Lake (Rainy River District)
- Cole Lake (Cochrane District)
- Cole Lake (Timiskaming District)
- Coleman Lake (Fox Township, Cochrane District)
- Coleman Lake (Thunder Bay District)
- Coleman Lake (Kenora District)
- Coleman Lake (Haliburton County)
- Coleman Lake (Timiskaming District)
- Coleman Lake (Mewhinney Township, Cochrane District)
- Colenso Lake
- Coles Lake
- Colette Lake
- Colfe Lake
- Colgrove Lake
- Coli Lake
- Colin Lake (Rainy River District)
- Colin Lake (Renfrew County)
- Colin Lake (Sudbury District)
- Colin Scott Lake
- Collacutt Lake
- Collaton Lake
- Colleen Lake (Thunder Bay District)
- Colleen Lake (Sudbury District)
- Collin Lake
- Collinge Lake
- Collins Lake (Renfrew County)
- Collins Lake (Frontenac County)
- Collins Lake (Nipissing District)
- Collins Lake (Timiskaming District)
- Collins Lake (Thunder Bay District)
- Collins Lake (Cochrane District)
- Collis Lake
- Collishaw Lake
- Collver Lake
- Colonel By Lake
- Colonna Lake
- Colpitts Lake
- Colter Lake
- Colton Lake (Admaston/Bromley)
- Colton Lake (Laurentian Hills)
- Coltson Lake
- Columbia Lake
- Columbus Lake (Cochrane District)
- Columbus Lake (Timiskaming District)
- Colvin Lake
- Colwill Lake
- Combe Lake
- Comma Lake
- Command Lake
- Commanda Lake
- Commando Lake (Sudbury District)
- Commando Lake (Cochrane District)
- Commodore Lake
- Como Lake (Rainy River District)
- Como Lake (Bazett Township, Sudbury District)
- Como Lake (Strathearn Township, Sudbury District)
- Comox Lake
- Companion Lakes
- Compass Lake (Thunder Bay District)
- Compass Lake (Parry Sound District)
- Compass Lake (Timiskaming District)
- Compass Lake (Peterborough County)
- Compass Lakes
- Complin Lake

== Con ==
- Con Lake
- Conacher Lake
- Conant Lake
- Conboy Lake
- Conboys Lake
- Concession Lake (Cardwell Township, Muskoka Lakes)
- Concession Lake (Peterborough County)
- Concession Lake (Medora Township, Muskoka Lakes)
- Concord Lake
- Cond Lake
- Condon Lake
- Cone Lake (Kenora District)
- Cone Lake (Rainy River District)
- Conestogo Lake
- Confederation Lake
- Confusion Lake
- Conger Lake
- Conglomerate Lake (Timiskaming District)
- Conglomerate Lake (Thunder Bay District)
- Conick Lake
- Conifer Lake
- Conk Lake
- Conklin Lake
- Conley Lake (Algoma District)
- Conley Lake (Bruce County)
- Conlin Lake
- Conlon Lake
- Conmee Lake
- Connaught Lake
- Connecting Lake
- Connell Lake
- Connell's Lake
- Connells Lake
- Connelly Lake
- Connett Lake
- Connon Lake
- Connor Lake (Renfrew County)
- Connor Lake (Thunder Bay District)
- Connor Lake (Hastings County)
- Connors Lake (Lennox and Addington County)
- Connors Lake (Lanark County)
- Conolly Lake
- Conover Lake
- Conross Lake
- Consecon Lake
- Constance Lake (Cochrane District)
- Constance Lake (Algoma District)
- Constance Lake (Ottawa)
- Constance Lake (Timiskaming District)
- Constant Lake
- Contact Lake (Timiskaming District)
- Contact Lake (Kenora District)
- Contact Lake (Nipissing District)
- Contau Lake
- Conte Lake
- Contin Lake
- Conver Lake
- Convey Lake
- Conway Lake (Renfrew County)
- Conway Lake (Algoma District)
- Cony Lake

== Coo ==
- Cooch Lake
- Cook Lake (English River, Kenora District)
- Cook Lake (Frontenac County)
- Cook Lake (Cochrane District)
- Cook Lake (McNaughton Township, Kenora District)
- Cook Lake (Thunder Bay District)
- Cook Lake (Britton Township, Kenora District)
- Cook Pond
- Cook's Lake
- Cooke Lake (Timiskaming District)
- Cooke Lake (Nipissing District)
- Cooke Lake (Sudbury District)
- Cookery Lake
- Cooley Pond
- Coollas Lake
- Coombs Lake
- Coomer Lake
- Cooney Lake (Kawartha Lakes)
- Cooney Lake (Thunder Bay District)
- Coonie Lake
- Coons Lake
- Coop Lake
- Cooper Lake (Oscar Township, Algoma District)
- Cooper Lake (Muskoka District)
- Cooper Lake (Haughton Township, Algoma District)
- Cooper Lake (Parry Sound District)
- Cooper Lake (Nipissing District)
- Coot Lake (Sudbury District)
- Coot Lake (Nipissing District)
- Coot Lake (Cochrane District)
- Cootie Lake

== Cop–Coy ==
- Cop Lake (Timiskaming District)
- Cop Lake (Nipissing District)
- Cope Lake
- Copeland Lake
- Copenhagen Lake
- Copeway Lake
- Copilot Lake
- Copp Lake
- Lac de Coppell
- Coppell Lake
- Coppens Lake
- Copper Lake (Haliburton County)
- Copper Lake (Peterborough County)
- Copper Lake (Hastings County)
- Copper Lake (Timiskaming District)
- Copperfield Lake
- Coppersand Lake
- Copping Lake
- Copps Lake (Grey County)
- Copps Lake (Nipissing District)
- Coral Lake
- Coral-root Lake
- Corallen Lake
- Corbeau Lake
- Corben Lake
- Corbett Lake (Haliburton County)
- Corbett Lake (Kenora District)
- Corbier Lake
- Corbiere Lake
- Corby Lake
- Cord Lake
- Cordes Lake
- Cordick Lake
- Cordingley Lake
- Cordner Lake
- Cordova Lake
- Core Lake (Thunder Bay District)
- Core Lake (Kenora District)
- Coreaux Lake
- Corfe Lake
- Corine Lake
- Cork Lake (Scriven Township, Sudbury District)
- Cork Lake (Thunder Bay District)
- Cork Lake (Sothman Township, Sudbury District)
- Cork Lake (Nipissing District)
- Corkery Lake
- Corking Lake
- Corkscrew Lake
- Corless Lake
- Cormick Lake
- Corn Lake (Sioux Narrows-Nestor Falls)
- Corn Lake (Redditt Township, Kenora District)
- Cornall Lake
- Corncob Lake
- Cornelius Lake
- Cornell Lake (Kenora District)
- Cornell Lake (Big Turtle River, Rainy River District)
- Cornell Lake (Cornell Creek, Rainy River District)
- Corner Lake (Mercutio River, Thunder Bay District)
- Corner Lake (Docker Township, Kenora District)
- Corner Lake (Jackman Township, Kenora District)
- Corner Lake (Asselin Township, Algoma District)
- Corner Lake (Gaiashk Township, Algoma District)
- Corner Lake (Beaton Township, Algoma District)
- Corner Lake (Greenstone)
- Corner Lake (Timiskaming District)
- Corner Lakes
- Cornerstone Lake
- Cornet Lake
- Cornfield Lake
- Cornice Lake
- Cornick Lake
- Cornish Lake (Thunder Bay District)
- Cornish Lake (Parry Sound District)
- Coronary Lake
- Coronation Lake
- Corr Lake
- Corre Lake
- Correll Lake
- Corri Lake
- Corrie Lake (Milfair Lake, Kenora District)
- Corrie Lake (Shinbone Lake, Kenora District)
- Corrigan Lake (Sudbury District)
- Corrigan Lake (Thunder Bay District)
- Corrigan Lake (Kenora District)
- Corry Lake
- Corset Lake (Sudbury District)
- Corset Lake (Timiskaming District)
- Corsica Lake
- Corson Lake
- Cortez Lake
- Corvec Lake
- Corylus Lake
- Cosens Lake (Thunder Bay District)
- Cosens Lake (Sudbury District)
- Cosgrave Lake
- Cosgrove Lake
- Cosh Lake
- Cosmo Lake
- Costello Lake (Sudbury District)
- Costello Lake (Kenora District)
- Costello Lake (Nipissing District)
- Costello Lake (Timiskaming District)
- Côté Lake (Sudbury District)
- Côté Lake (Kenora District)
- Cotoneaster Lake
- Cotter Lake (Muskoka District)
- Cotter Lake (Cochrane District)
- Cotters Lake
- Cottle Lake
- Cotton Lake
- Cottontail Lake
- Coubran Lake
- Couchain Lake
- Coucheemoskog Lake
- Lake Couchiching
- Coughlan Lake
- Coulas Lake
- Coull Lake
- Lac Coulonge
- Coulson Lake (Cochrane District)
- Coulson Lake (Rainy River District)
- Coulter Lake
- Council Lake
- Countess Lake
- Couple Lake
- Courchesne's Lake
- Course Lake
- Court Lake
- Courtis Lake
- Courtney Lake
- Coutch Lake
- Coutts Lake
- Couture Lake (Kenora District)
- Couture Lake (Thunder Bay District)
- Coveney Lake
- Coveo Lake
- Cover Lake
- Covey Lake
- Coville Lake
- Cow Lake (Haliburton County)
- Cow Lake (Greater Sudbury)
- Cow Lake (Timiskaming District)
- Cow Lake (Kenora District)
- Cow Lake (Sudbury District)
- Cow-in-Lake
- Cowamula Lake
- Cowan Lake (Muskoka District)
- Cowan Lake (Southern Lake, Thunder Bay District)
- Cowan Lake (Cowan Creek, Thunder Bay District)
- Cowan's Lake
- Cowboy Lake
- Cowichan Lake
- Cowie Lake (Algoma District)
- Cowie Lake (Timiskaming District)
- Cowles Lake
- Cowman Lake
- Cox Lake (Algoma District)
- Cox Lake (Thunder Bay District)
- Cox Lake (Keys Lake, Kenora District)
- Cox Lake (Mennin River, Kenora District)
- Cox Lake (Peterborough County)
- Cox's Lake
- Coy Lake
- Coyle Lake (Lanark County)
- Coyle Lake (Thunder Bay District)
- Coyne Lake (Sudbury District)
- Coyne Lake (Thunder Bay District)
- Coyston Lake

== Cra–Cri ==
- Crab Lake (Spanish)
- Crab Lake (Quill Township, Algoma District)
- Crab Lake (Peterborough County)
- Crab Lake (Sudbury District)
- Crabclaw Lake
- Crabtree Lake (Thunder Bay District)
- Crabtree Lake (Sudbury District)
- Cracknell Lake
- Crackshot Lake
- Craddock Lake
- Cradle Lake
- Cradle Lakes
- Craft Lake (Head Creek, Thunder Bay District)
- Craft Lake (Schreiber)
- Crag Lake (Thunder Bay District)
- Crag Lake (Frontenac County)
- Craig Lake (Algoma District)
- Craig Lake (Thunder Bay District)
- Craig Lake (Nipissing District)
- Craig Lake (Rainy River District)
- Craig Lake (Lanark County)
- Craignaivie Lake
- Crain Lake
- Crains Lake
- Cramadog Lake
- Cramp Lake (Thunder Bay District)
- Cramp Lake (Kenora District)
- Cranberry Creek Lake
- Cranberry Lake (Digby Township, Kawartha Lakes)
- Cranberry Lake (Carden Township, Kawartha Lakes)
- Cranberry Lake (Head, Clara and Maria)
- Cranberry Lake (South Canonto Township, North Frontenac)
- Cranberry Lake (Central Frontenac)
- Cranberry Lake (East Mills Township, Parry Sound District)
- Cranberry Lake (Whitefish Lake 6)
- Cranberry Lake (Hastings County)
- Cranberry Lake (Haliburton County)
- Cranberry Lake (Severn)
- Cranberry Lake (Lanark County)
- Cranberry Lake (Palmerston Township, North Frontenac)
- Cranberry Lake (Sutherland Township, Rainy River District)
- Cranberry Lake (The Archipelago)
- Cranberry Lake (Pittsburgh Township, South Frontenac)
- Cranberry Lake (Burwash Township, Sudbury District)
- Cranberry Lake (Portland Township, South Frontenac)
- Cranberry Lake (Pear Lake, Rainy River District)
- Cranberry Lake (Collingwood)
- Cranberry Lake (Madawaska Valley)
- Cranberry Lake (Leeds and Grenville United Counties)
- Cranberry Lake (McDougall)
- Cranberry Lake (Dalton Township, Kawartha Lakes)
- Cranberry Lake (Kenora District)
- Cranberry Lake (Algoma District)
- Crane Lake (Bruce County)
- Crane Lake (Cochrane District)
- Crane Lake (Timiskaming District)
- Crane Lake (Parry Sound District)
- Crane Lake (Kenora District)
- Crane Lake (Peterborough County)
- Cranebill Lake
- Cranesnest Lake
- Cranjelly Lake
- Crankshaw Lake
- Crash Lake
- Crater Lake
- Crater Lakes
- Crates Lake
- Craven Lake
- Crawfish Lake (Duff Township, Cochrane District)
- Crawfish Lake (Gurney Township, Cochrane District)
- Crawford Lake (Halton Region)
- Crawford Lake (Haultain, Timiskaming District)
- Crawford Lake (Rainy River District)
- Crawford Lake (Parry Sound District)
- Crawford Lake (Cochrane District)
- Crawford Lake (Sudbury District)
- Crawford Lake (Milner Township, Timiskaming District)
- Cray Lake
- Crayfish Lake (Thunder Bay District)
- Crayfish Lake (Algoma District)
- Crayon Lake
- Crazy Lake (Algoma District)
- Crazy Lake (Venturi Township, Sudbury District)
- Crazy Lake (Admiral Township, Sudbury District)
- Cream Lake (Algoma District)
- Cream Lake (Muskoka District)
- Creamer Lake
- Creasy Lake
- Creation Lake
- Cree Lake (Sudbury District)
- Cree Lake (Algoma District)
- Cree Lake (Cochrane District)
- Creed Lake
- Creede Lake
- Creek's End Lake
- Creeping Lake
- Creepy Lake
- Crego Lake
- Creighton Lake
- Creppy Lake
- Crerar Lake
- Crescent Lake (Algoma District)
- Crescent Lake (Zigzag Lake, Thunder Bay District)
- Crescent Lake (Sudbury District)
- Crescent Lake (Fort William 52)
- Crescent Lake (Nipissing District)
- Crescent Lake (Kenora District)
- Crescent Lake (Mackie Lake, Thunder Bay District)
- Crescent Lake (Oboshkegan Township, Thunder Bay District)
- Crescent Lake (Cochrane District)
- Cressey Lake
- Cressview Lakes
- Cressy Lake
- Crest Lake (Nipissing District)
- Crest Lake (Thunder Bay District)
- Crest Lake (Cochrane District)
- Creswicke Lake
- Crevasse Lake
- Crevice Lake
- Crew Lake
- Crib Lake (Frontenac County)
- Crib Lake (Thunder Bay District)
- Crickard Lake
- Cripple Lake (Nipissing District)
- Cripple Lake (Timiskaming District)
- Cripple Lakes
- Crispin Lake
- Cristal Lake
- Cristene Lake
- Critchell Lake

== Cro–Cry ==
- Croal Lake
- Croasdell Lake
- Crocan Lake
- Crock Lake
- Crockatt Lake
- Crocker's Lake
- Croesus Lake
- Croft Lake
- Lac la Croix
- Croker Lake
- Croll Lake (Algoma District)
- Croll Lake (Thunder Bay District)
- Cromarty Lake
- Crombie Lake
- Cronin Lake
- Cronk Lake
- Crony Lake
- Crook Lake
- Crooked Cane Lake
- Crooked Chute Lake
- Crooked Green Lake
- Crooked Lake (Frontenac County)
- Crooked Lake (Laurentian Valley)
- Crooked Lake (Kearney)
- Crooked Lake (Kawartha Lakes)
- Crooked Lake (Cox Township, Sudbury District)
- Crooked Lake (Burwash Township, Sudbury District)
- Crooked Lake (Rainy River District)
- Crooked Lake (Greater Sudbury)
- Crooked Lake (Madawaska Valley)
- Crooked Lake (Kenora District)
- Crooked Lake (Patterson Township, Parry Sound District)
- Crooked Lake (Lennox and Addington County)
- Crooked Lake (Brackin Township, Sudbury District)
- Crooked Lake (Nipissing District)
- Crooked Lakes
- Crooked Pine Lake
- Crookstick Lake
- Croon Lake
- Crosby Lake (Timiskaming District)
- Crosby Lake (Algoma District)
- Crosby Lake (Leeds and Grenville United Counties)
- Croshaw Lake
- Croskery Lake
- Crosman Lake
- Cross Corner Lake
- Cross Lake (Deacon Creek, Kenora District)
- Cross Lake (South Algonquin)
- Cross Lake (Temagami)
- Cross Lake (St.-Charles)
- Cross Lake (Algoma District)
- Cross Lake (Curtin Township, Sudbury District)
- Cross Lake (Parry Sound District)
- Cross Lake (Mister Creek, Kenora District)
- Crossbar Lake
- Crossbill Lake
- Crosscut Lake
- Crossecho Lake
- Crossland Lake
- Crossley Lake
- Crosson Lake
- Crossover Lake
- Crosspath Lake
- Crossroute Lake
- Crosstee Lake
- Crosswise Lake
- Crotch Lake (Algoma District)
- Crotch Lake (North Frontenac)
- Crotch Lake (Timiskaming District)
- Crotch Lake (Nipissing District)
- Crotch Lake (Central Frontenac)
- Crotch Lake (Parry Sound District)
- Crotch Lake (Muskoka District)
- Crotchet Lake
- Crotin Lake
- Crouch Lake
- Crow Lake (Thunder Bay District)
- Crow Lake (Leeds and Grenville United Counties)
- Crow Lake (McDougall)
- Crow Lake (Central Frontenac–South Frontenac)
- Crow Lake (Brown Township, Parry Sound District)
- Crow Lake (Sudbury District)
- Crow Lake (The North Shore)
- Crow Lake (McEwing Township, Algoma District)
- Crow Lake (Devil Lake, South Frontenac)
- Crowder Lake
- Crowduck Lake
- Crowe Lake
- Crowfoot Lake
- Crowley Lake
- Crown Lake (Haliburton County)
- Crown Lake (Timiskaming District)
- Crown Lake (Cochrane District)
- Crowrock Lake
- Croy Lake
- Crozier Lake (Thunder Bay District)
- Crozier Lake (Algoma District)
- Cruelface Lake
- Cruise Lake
- Cruiser Lake
- Crumby Lake
- Crump Lake
- Cruse Lake
- Cruso Lake
- Crutch Lake
- Cry Lake
- Cryderman Lake (Sudbury District)
- Cryderman Lake (Kenora District)
- Crystal Lake (Neebing)
- Crystal Lake (Haliburton County)
- Crystal Lake (Cochrane District)
- Crystal Lake (Tweedle Township, Algoma District)
- Crystal Lake (Rainy River District)
- Crystal Lake (Machin)
- Crystal Lake (Norfolk County)
- Crystal Lake (Frechette Township, Sudbury District)
- Crystal Lake (Crystal River, Kenora District)
- Crystal Lake (Lennox and Addington County)
- Crystal Lake (Antrim Township, Sudbury District)
- Crystal Lake (Bayly Township, Timiskaming District)
- Crystal Lake (Peterborough County)
- Crystal Lake (Lebel Township, Timiskaming District)
- Crystal Lake (Ambrose Lake, Thunder Bay District)
- Crystal Lake (Aweres Township, Algoma District)
- Crystalline Lake (Haliburton County)
- Crystalline Lake (Nipissing District)

== Cu ==
- Cub Lake (Kenora District)
- Cub Lake (Rainy River District)
- Cub Lake (Cochrane District)
- Cuckoo Lake (Cochrane District)
- Cuckoo Lake (Nipissing District)
- Cuckoo Lake (Sudbury District)
- Cucumber Lake (Sudbury District)
- Cucumber Lake (Frontenac County)
- Cuddys Lake
- Cul de Sac Lake
- Culbert Lake
- Culhanes Lake
- Culin Lake
- Cull Lake (Thunder Bay District)
- Cull Lake (Simcoe County)
- Cullen Lake (Sudbury District)
- Cullen Lake (Rainy River District)
- Cullin Lake
- Culloden Lake
- Culverson Lake
- Cumaway Lake
- Cumming Lake
- Cumming's Lake
- Cummings Lake
- Cummins Lake
- Cuncic Lake
- Cuni Lake
- Cunniah Lake
- Cunningham Lake (Timiskaming District)
- Cunningham Lake (Bruce County)
- Cup Lake
- Cupa Lake
- Curie Lake
- Curlew Lake (Nipissing District)
- Curlew Lake (Thunder Bay District)
- Curleys Lake
- Curly Lake (Nipissing District)
- Curly Lake (Sudbury District)
- Current Lake
- Currie Lake (Timiskaming District)
- Currie Lake (Hastings County)
- Currie Lake (Cochrane District)
- Currier Lake
- Curriers Lake
- Curry Lake (Nadjiwon Township, Algoma District)
- Curry Lake (Desbiens Township, Algoma District)
- Curtis Lake (Rainy River District)
- Curtis Lake (Thunder Bay District)
- Curve Lake (Thunder Bay District)
- Curve Lake (Kenora District)
- Curve Lake (Algoma District)
- Curzon Lake
- Cushing Lake (Thunder Bay District)
- Cushing Lake (Algoma District)
- Cushing Lake (Rainy River District)
- Cuss Lake
- Cut Lake
- Cutcliffe Lake
- Cuthbert Lake (Kenora District)
- Cuthbert Lake (Cochrane District)
- Cuthbertson Lake
- Cutler Lake
- Cutstone Lake
- Cuttle Lake

== Cy ==
- Cutty Lake
- Cybulski Lake
- Cygnet Lake
- Lac aux Cypres
- Cypress Lake (Thunder Bay District)
- Cypress Lake (Algoma District)
- Cyprus Lake
- Cyril Lake (Cochrane District)
- Cyril Lake (Knight Township, Timiskaming District)
- Cyril Lake (Coleman)
