= Canoe Lake =

Canoe Lake may refer to:

== Canada ==
- Canoe Lake (Nova Scotia)
- Canoe Lake (Saskatchewan), a lake in northeastern Saskatchewan

=== In Ontario ===
- In Algoma District
  - Canoe Lake (Scarfe Township)
  - Canoe Lake (The North Shore)
- Canoe Lake (Frontenac County)
- Canoe Lake (Kenora District)
- Canoe Lake (Lennox and Addington County)
- Canoe Lake (Nipissing District), the location of painter Tom Thomson's death in 1917
  - Canoe Lake, Ontario, a community on the shore of the above lake
- Canoe Lake (Parry Sound District)
- In Renfrew County
  - Canoe Lake (Greater Madawaska)
  - Canoe Lake (Madawaska Valley)
- Canoe Lake (Sudbury District)
- In Thunder Bay District
  - Canoe Lake (Barnard Creek), in the northwest of Thunder Bay District
  - Canoe Lake (Syine Township), in geographic Syine Township near Lake Superior
- Canoe Lake (Timiskaming District)

== United Kingdom ==
- Canoe Lake (Southsea) on Portsea Island in Hampshire

== United States ==
- Canoe Lake (Pennsylvania) a lake at Canoe Creek State Park in Pennsylvania
