= Crawford Lake (disambiguation) =

Crawford Lake Conservation Area is in Halton, Ontario, Canada.

Crawford Lake or Lake Crawford may also refer to:

== Canada ==
- Crawford Lake (Cochrane District), Ontario
- Crawford Lake, Halton Region, Ontario, a meromictic lake associated with the proposed Anthropocene epoch.
- Crawford Lake (Parry Sound District), Ontario
- Crawford Lake (Rainy River District), Ontario
- Crawford Lake (Sudbury District), Ontario
- Crawford Lake (Haultain Township), Timiskaming District, Ontario
- Crawford Lake (Milner Township), Timiskaming District, Ontario

== United States ==
- Crawford Lake (Wright County, Minnesota)
- Crawford Lake (Washington)
- Lake Crawford, a small lake in Kings Mountain State Park, North Carolina
