= Canoe (disambiguation) =

A canoe is a light narrow boat, pointed at both ends, propelled with a paddle.

Canoe may also refer to:

- Kayak in the United Kingdom
- Canoeing, a paddle sport

== Geography ==
=== Australia ===
- Canoe Reach (Brisbane River), a reach of the Brisbane River in Queensland

=== Canada ===
- Canoe, British Columbia, in the city of Salmon Arm
- Canoe Bay, British Columbia, in the district municipality of North Saanich
- Canoe Bay, Ontario, in Kenora District, Ontario
- Canoe Bay Channel, in Greater Sudbury, Ontario
- Canoe Cove, Prince Edward Island, in the township Lot 65
- Canoe Creek (volcano), a volcano in British Columbia
- Canoe Creek Indian Reserve No. 1, an Indian Reserve in British Columbia, Canada
- Canoe Creek, Ontario, in Parry Sound District, Ontario
- Canoe Cut, Ontario, in Muskoka District Municipality, Ontario
- Canoe Lake 165, Saskatchewan, an Indian Reserve
- Canoe Lake, Nova Scotia, on Cape Breton Island
- Canoe Lake, Ontario (disambiguation), the name of numerous locations in the province
- Canoe Lake, Saskatchewan, at Cole Bay, Saskatchewan
- Canoe Narrows, Saskatchewan, in the Canoe Lake 165 Indian Reserve
- Canoe Narrows, Ontario, in Kenora District, Ontario
- Canoe Pass, British Columbia, in the district municipality of Delta, British Columbia
- Canoe Point, Ontario, in Algoma District, Ontario
- Canoe River (British Columbia)

=== United States ===
- Canoe, Alabama
- Canoe, Kentucky
- Canoe Brook, a tributary of the Passaic River in New Jersey
- Canoe Creek State Park, a state park in Pennsylvania
- Canoe Township, Indiana County, Pennsylvania

== Other uses ==
- Canoe.com, a Canadian web portal
- Dragging Canoe, a Cherokee (American Indian) war leader
- John Canoe, a ritual once common in coastal North Carolina, and still practiced in some parts of the Caribbean
- Canoe plants, plants taken from ancient Polynesia and transplanted to several different islands in the Pacific
- CANoe, a Controller Area Network (CAN) software development tool
- Canoe Bar and Restaurant, a high end restaurant located on the 54th floor of the Toronto Dominion Centre
- CANOE, an acronym for the Big Five personality traits

== See also ==
- Outline of canoeing and kayaking
- Canoo, German-American manufacturer of electric vehicles
- Canu
