= Corrigan Lake =

Corrigan Lake, Lake Corrigan or Lac Corrigan may refer to one of the following lakes in Canada:

- Ontario
  - Corrigan Lake (Kenora District)
  - Corrigan Lake (Sudbury District)
  - Corrigan Lake (Thunder Bay District)
- Quebec
  - Lac Corrigan Senneterre, La Vallée-de-l'Or Regional County Municipality
  - Lac Corrigan in Lac-Nilgaut, Pontiac Regional County Municipality
  - Lac Corrigan in Val-des-Monts, Les Collines-de-l'Outaouais Regional County Municipality
  - Petit lac Corrigan, Sheenboro, Pontiac Regional County Municipality
