= Deloro =

- Unincorporated community
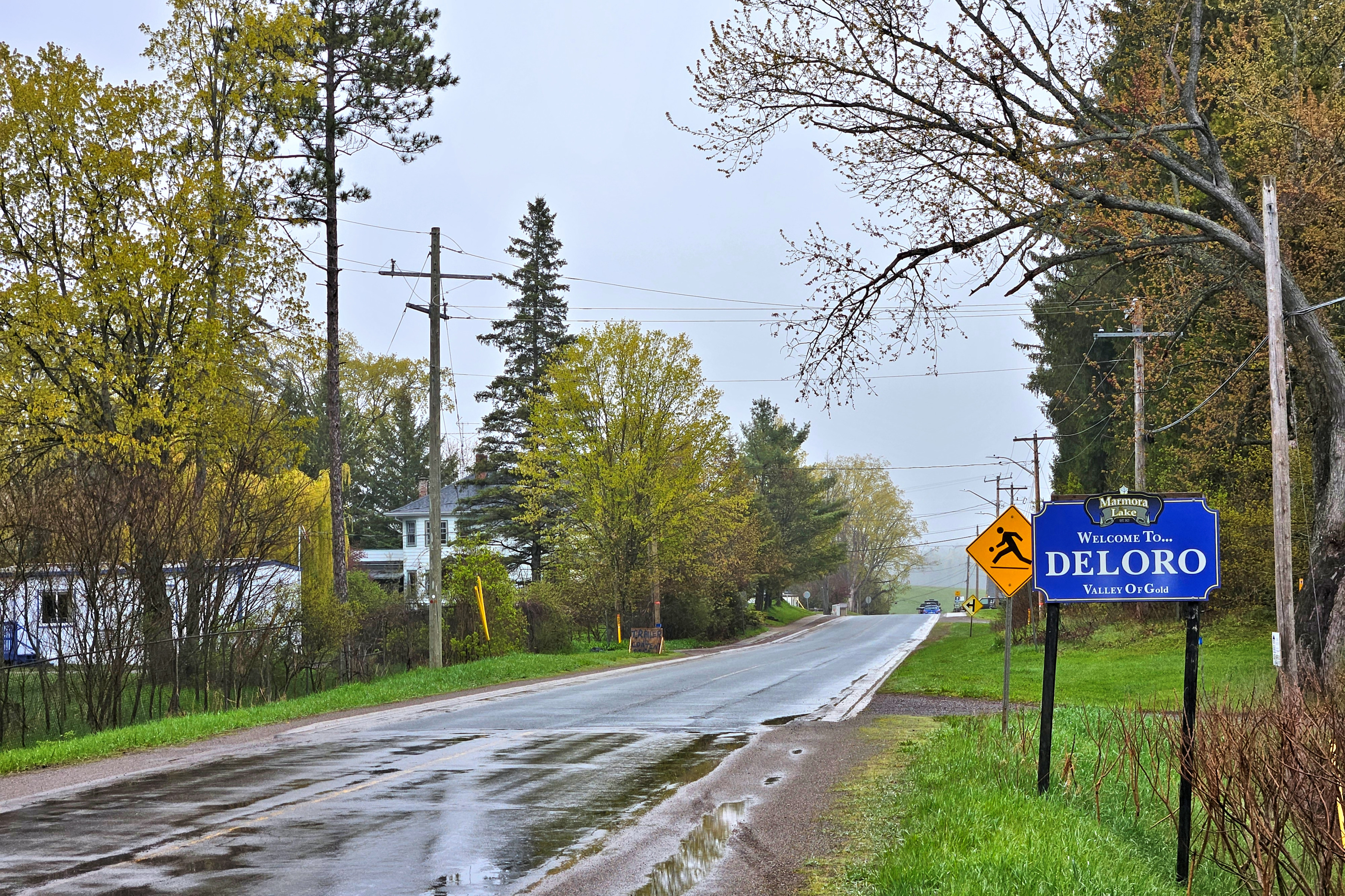

- Location in southern Ontario
- Coordinates: 44°30′42″N 77°37′24″W
- Country: Canada
- Province: Ontario
- County: Hastings
- Municipality: Marmora and Lake
- First settled: 1868
- Incorporated: 1919
- Amalgamated: 1998

Area
  - Land: 1.06 km^{2} (0.41 sq mi)
- Elevation: 206 m (676 ft)

Population (2021)
  - Total: 143
  - Density: 134.6/km^{2} (349/sq mi)
- Time zone: UTC-5 (Eastern Time Zone)
  - Summer (DST): UTC-4 (Eastern Time Zone)
- Postal code FSA: K0K
- Area codes: 613, 343

Deloro is a community in geographic Marmora Township in the Municipality of Marmora and Lake, Hastings County in Central Ontario, Canada. Deloro is about 200 kilometres (120 mi) southwest of Ottawa and 65 kilometres (40 mi) east of Peterborough. The Deloro Mine site sits along the banks of the Moira River, along the east side of the community. During the gold rush days, after striking gold in Eldorado in 1866, prospectors built at least 25 shafts on the area now known as the Deloro Mine Site.

Deloro is also designated place for census purposes, and had a population of 143 in the Canada 2021 Census.

== History ==
In 1868 gold was discovered in Deloro, meaning "Valley of Gold". The Canadian Consolidated Gold Mining Company (a British company) began mining in 1873. This eventually failed since the recover of the gold was so poor. In 1896 Canadian Gold Fields Company bought Deloro and built the first mill where they used a new cyanide process to extract the gold. Roasting furnaces were used to remove the arsenic from the gold, but the quality of the gold was poor, forcing the closure of the mill in 1903. After the completion of the railroad in 1904 it opened up the possibility to ship silver to the Deloro mine for treatment. In 1906 the Deloro Mining and Reduction Company was formed. In 1915 the company changed its name to Deloro Smelting and Refining Company Limited after Dr. Haynes developed the first commercially produced stellite in the world, which was manufactured at the Deloro plant.

In 1916 the company began building homes and a public school for its employees and their families. In 1919 the village of Deloro incorporated, making it the smallest village in Ontario until its amalgamation with the Township of Marmora and Lake in the 1990s. The first reeve was S.B. Wright, the plant's general manager. For the next 40 years, the succeeding general managers would continue serve as reeve of the village.

Deloro homes had water and sewers before Madoc and Marmora. The town became famous as a sporting community. The company was said to have brought ringers to work at the mine. Baseball, hockey, tennis and lawn bowling were important activities. The lawn bowling green can still be seen in Deloro today, beside the Deloro sign, though it is no longer used for bowling.

Production was in stellite, arsenic, silver, and cobalt until 1956 when the stellite division moved to Belleville. Only silver ore continued to be treated there until the plant closed in March 1961. 'Cleanup' and demolition of the mine site followed with tons of arsenite refuse being buried, with the thoughts that it would eliminate the health hazard.

The 45 company-owned homes were sold off in 1961 for prices up to $900. The residents named their own reeve and council to oversee the less than 200 population, which continued until its amalgamation. The last reeve of Deloro was Doug Lynch, who was one of the original buyers of the land.

== Demographics ==
Historical census populations – Deloro, Ontario
Year	Pop.	±%
2001	159	—
2006	140	−11.9%
2011	153	+9.3%
2016	139	−9.2%
2021	143	+2.9%
Source: Statistics Canada

In the 2021 Census of Population conducted by Statistics Canada, Deloro had a population of 143 living in 62 of its 70 total private dwellings, a change of 2.9% from its 2016 population of 139. With a land area of 1.06 km^{2} (0.41 sq mi), it had a population density of 134.9/km^{2} (349.4/sq mi) in 2021.

Canada census – Deloro community profile

	2021	2016	2011
Population	143 (+2.9% from 2016)	139 (-9.2% from 2011)	153 (9.3% from 2006)
Land area	1.06 km^{2} (0.41 sq mi)	1.05 km^{2} (0.41 sq mi)	1.12 km^{2} (0.43 sq mi)
Population density	134.6/km^{2} (349/sq mi)	132.5/km^{2} (343/sq mi)	136.4/km^{2} (353/sq mi)
Median age		47.0 (M: 52.0, F: 45.0)	45.5 (M: 48, F: 43.5)
Private dwellings	70 (total)	69 (total)	72 (total)
Median household income		$36,352	$n/a

Notes:
References: 2021 2016 2011

== Environmental impact ==
When manufacturing operations shut down in 1961, nearly 100 years of hazardous by-products and residues were left behind on the Deloro Mine Site. These included a "complex blend of toxic compounds; metals like cobalt, copper, nickel; and low-level radioactive wastes". The high levels of arsenic on the site is the main concern. The low-level radioactive "slag and tailings produced during the re-refining of by-products from uranium refining has also had an impact. The operations at the Deloro Mine Site caused significant environmental impact including the contamination of soil, sediment, surface and ground water.

In 1979 the owners of the site abandoned the property and the Ministry of the Environment(MOE) took control of the old mine site. In 1997 soil samples taken from beyond the boundaries of the mine site showed the presences of arsenic, cobalt, nickel, silver and other heavy metals, which is presumed to have been caused by airborne pollutants released during the time the mine was active.

In 1998 the Ministry of the Environment began in Environment Health Risk Study for the village of Deloro. In the spring of 1998 a very detailed soil survey was taken involving 145 homes, and in the fall of 1998 the study measured the arsenic levels in the urine of Deloro residents. The soil samples showed higher arsenic, cobalt and lead amounts than the MOE's soil guideline values. Other contaminants; barium, copper, nickel, silver, strontium, uranium and zinc were all below. Radionuclides in the soil were also typical for Ontario. Urine tests showed no meaningful difference between those of the comparison samples taken from Havelock residents.

Seven gardens in Deloro gave soil and vegetables from their gardens. While the soil samples tended to be higher than those typically found in Ontario, the vegetables did not contain elevated contaminants.

Each home in Deloro, as well as the library, pump house and youth centre had swipe samples taken of interior surface dust. Levels of metals and radiological contaminants were not significantly different than those outside the study area. Fifty-seven homes were also test for radon gas at this time. Ten of them were found to have higher than the provincial guidelines for radon. All 10 of these homes had successful measures taken to prevent radon gases. These ranged from installing vacuum systems to simply replacing dirt basement floors with concrete ones.

The village of Deloro was tested for gamma radiation. Three locations were found to have elevated levels within the village, which were still below provincial requirements. All three of these areas were dug up and replaced with fresh dirt. The contaminated dirt was moved on the Deloro Mine Site.

All of the studies and tests done on the Village of Deloro and the Deloro Mine Site have made clear that it is safe to live, grow vegetables and drink the water in Village of Deloro. Yet the Deloro Mine Site is heavily contaminated and is not safe.

== Transportation ==
The Central Ontario Railway was opened in 1903, passing nearby at Marmora Station. The line has been abandoned and now forms part of the Hastings Heritage Trail, a rail trail.

Hastings County Road 11 passes through the community, heading south to a junction with Ontario Highway 7 about 5 kilometres (3 mi) east of the community of Marmora, and northeast to a junction with Ontario Highway 62 at Fox Corners.
