= Camp Robinson =

Camp Robinson may refer to:

- Fort Robinson, formerly Camp Robinson, a former U.S. Army fort and present-day state park in Crawford, Nebraska, US
- Robinson Maneuver Training Center, a former Regular Army post and current training facility of the U.S. Army National Guard, in North Little Rock, Arkansas, US
- Camp Dick Robinson, a Union Army organizational and training center near Lancaster, Garrard County, Kentucky, US
- Camp Robinson, Ontario, an unincorporated place and former settlement in Ontario, Canada
