= Marmora and Lake =

- Municipality (lower-tier)
- Municipality of Marmora and Lake
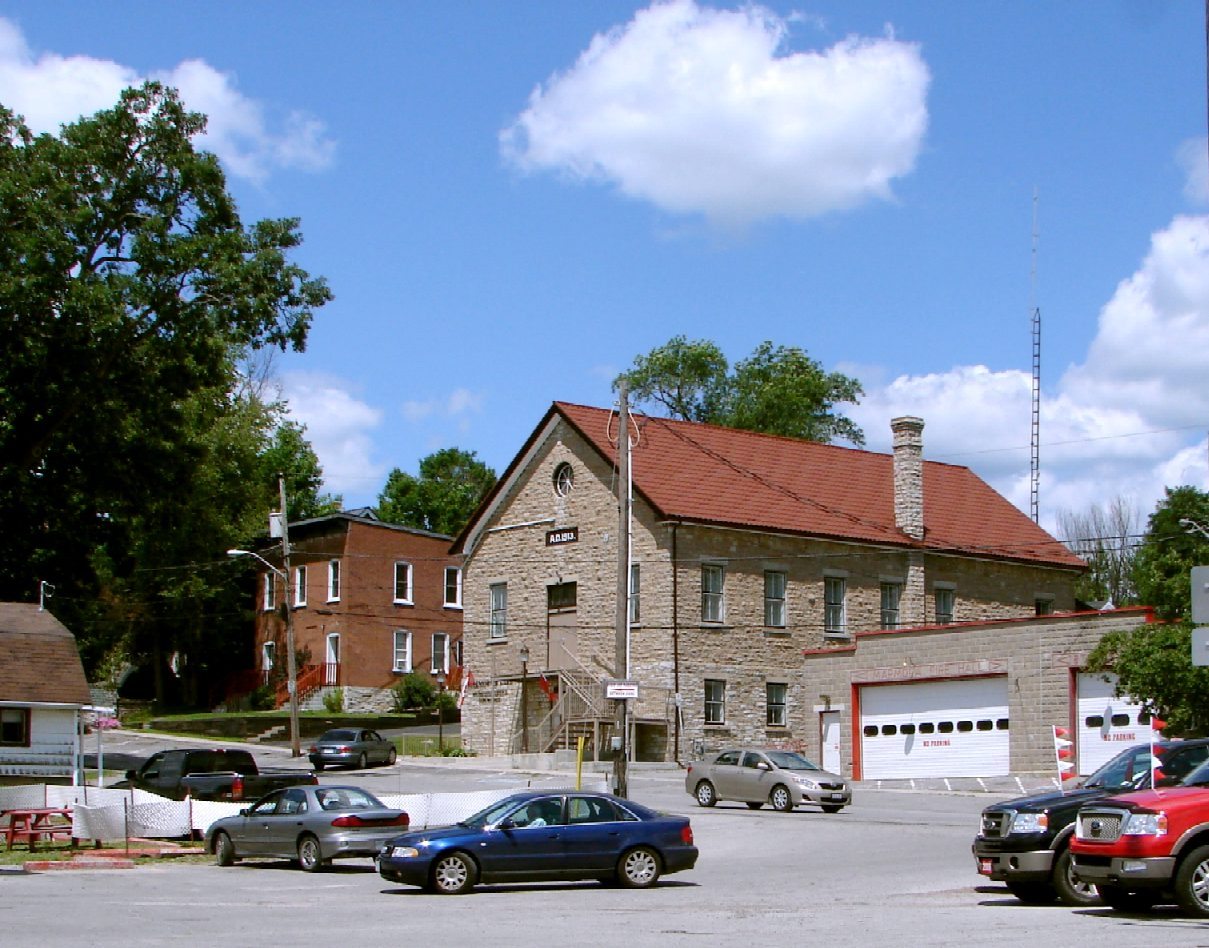
- Municipal office in Marmora

- Location in southern Ontario
- Coordinates: 44°38′33″N 77°44′14″W
- Country: Canada
- Province: Ontario
- County: Hastings
- Settled: 1821
- Incorporated: January 1, 2001

Government
  - Type: Municipality (low-tier)
  - Mayor: Jan O'Neill
  - Federal riding: Hastings—Lennox and Addington—Tyendinaga
  - Prov. riding: Hastings—Lennox and Addington

Area
  - Land: 538.24 km^{2} (207.82 sq mi)
- Elevation: 274 m (899 ft)

Population (2021)
  - Total: 4,267
  - Density: 7.9/km^{2} (20/sq mi)
- Time zone: UTC-5 (EST)
  - Summer (DST): UTC-4 (EDT)
- Postal Code: K0K 2M0
- Area codes: 613 and 343
- Website: www.marmoraandlake.ca

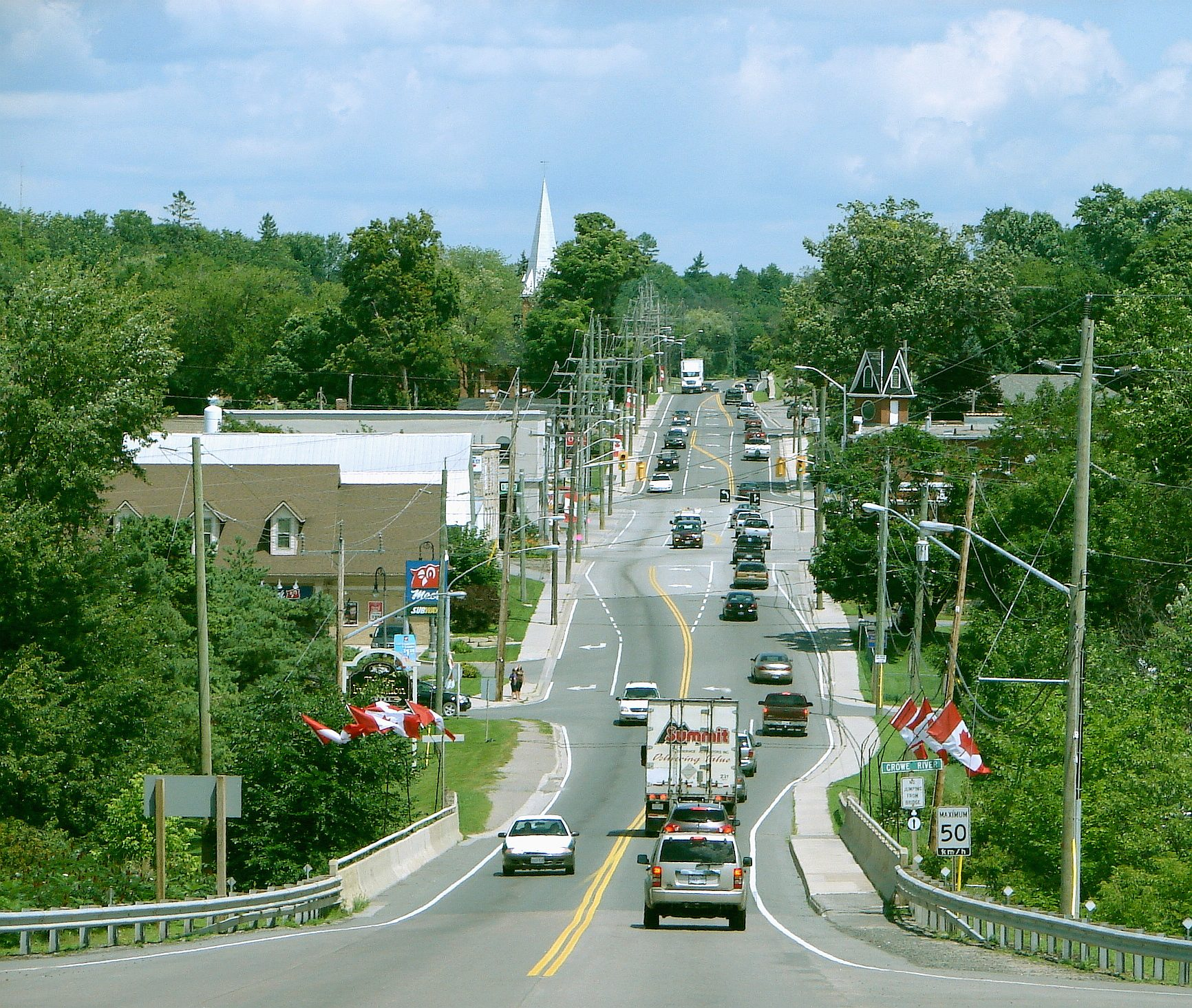
Ontario Highway 7 through Marmora

Marmora and Lake is a municipality along the banks of Crowe River and Beaver Creek, about midway between Toronto and Ottawa on provincial Highway 7 in Hastings County in Central Ontario, Canada. It is home to over 4,000 full time and seasonal residents, many of whom enjoy outdoor recreation and relaxation on Crowe Lake.

== Communities ==
- Deloro
- Malone
- Marmora – largest and primary population centre within the municipality
- Marmora Station

== History ==
The original township of Marmora was named in 1820 for the Latin word for marble, while the adjoining Township of Lake was named for Viscount Gerard Lake. The two townships were joined to form the single municipality of Marmora and Lake in 2001. The village of Marmora separated from the township and was incorporated as a separate municipality in 1901.

Mining played an important role in the development of the area. Iron mining was particularly important in the area. Other minerals extracted from township mines include copper, lead, silver, gold and lithographic limestone. Today, talc and dolomite are processed in the municipality at the site of the former Bethlehem Steel Corporation iron ore open pit mine.

In 1998, the township expanded through an amalgamation of the Village of Deloro.

The current municipality was formed in 2001 through an amalgamation of the Village of Marmora and the existing Township of Marmora and Lake.

== Demographics ==
In the 2021 Census of Population conducted by Statistics Canada, Marmora and Lake had a population of 4,267 living in 1,887 of its 2,578 total private dwellings, a change of 7.9% from its 2016 population of 3,953. With a land area of 538.24 km^{2} (207.82 sq mi), it had a population density of 7.9/km^{2} (20.5/sq mi) in 2021.

Canada census – Marmora and Lake community profile

	2021	2016	2011
Population	4,267 (+7.9% from 2016)	3,953 (-3.0% from 2011)	4,074 (+4.1% from 2006)
Land area	538.24 km^{2} (207.82 sq mi)	557.08 km^{2} (215.09 sq mi)	556.19 km^{2} (214.75 sq mi)
Population density	7.9/km^{2} (20/sq mi)	7.1/km^{2} (18/sq mi)	7.3/km^{2} (19/sq mi)
Median age	56.0 (M: 54.4, F: 56.8)	54.6 (M: 53.8, F: 55.4)	50.9 (M: 50.2, F: 51.6)
Private dwellings	2,578 (total) 1,887 (occupied)	2,521 (total)	2,503 (total)
Median household income	$62,800	$50,586

References: 2021 2016 2011

Historical census populations – Marmora and Lake

Year	Pop.	±%
1996	3,874	—
2001	3,985	+2.9%
2006	3,912	−1.8%

Year	Pop.	±%
2011	4,074	+4.1%
2016	3,953	−3.0%
2021	4,267	+7.9%

Source: Statistics Canada

According to the 2021 Census, mother tongue of its population is:

- English as first language: 95.0%
- French as first language: 0.8%
- English and French as first language: 0.1%
- Other as first language: 3.6%

== Government ==
Marmora and Lake Council, as of 2023:

- Jan O'Neill, Mayor
- Mike Stevens, Deputy Mayor
- Eric Daoust, Councillor
- Ron Derry, Councillor
- Jane Lakatos, Councillor

Provincial and federal representation:

- M.P.P. Ric Bresee, Progressive Conservative Party of Ontario, for the provincial riding of Hastings—Lennox and Addington, elected in the 2022 provincial election.
- M.P. Shelby Kramp-Neuman, Conservative Party of Canada, for the federal riding of Hastings—Lennox and Addington, elected in the 2021 Canadian federal election.

=== Former mayors ===
- Lionel Bennett
- Terry Clemens (...–2018)
- Jan O'Neill (2018–present)

== Tourist attractions ==
- Marmoraton Mine
- Nayler's Common Wetland and Trails
- Eastern Ontario Trails
- Callaghan's Rapids
- Crowe Lake
- Beaver Creek
- MACKFest

== Notable residents ==
- Yaphet Kotto - actor
- Sarah and Rob Skinner - Red Dirt Skinners musical group
- Greg Terrion - Toronto Maple Leafs hockey player

== See also ==
- List of townships in Ontario
