= Cedar River (Ontario) =

- Location of the mouth of the Cedar River in Ontario

Location
- Country: Canada
- Ontario: Ontario
- Region: Northwestern Ontario
- District: Kenora
- Part: Kenora, Unorganized

Physical characteristics
- Source: Cedar Lake
  - coordinates: 50°13′07″N 93°07′45″W
  - elevation: 357 m (1,171 ft)
- Mouth: English River
  - coordinates: 50°35′13″N 93°22′54″W
  - elevation: 348 m (1,142 ft)

Basin features
- River system: Hudson Bay drainage basin
- Tributaries
  - left: Anishinabi River
  - right: Ord River

The Cedar River is a river in the Hudson Bay drainage basin in the Unorganized Part of Kenora District in northwestern Ontario in Canada. The river is a left tributary of the English River.

== Course ==
The river begins at the outflow from Cedar Lake and flows north to through Church Lake to Perrault Lake where it takes in the right tributary Ord River. It flows out at the north end of the lake under Ontario Highway 105 and over the Perrault Falls at the unincorporated place of Perrault Falls, passes through Wabaskang Lake, takes in the left tributary Anishinabi River and reaches its mouth at the English River, just south of where Ontario Highway 804 crosses that river and about 6 kilometres (4 mi) upstream of the Ontario Power Generation Manitou Falls Generating Station. The Cedar River flows via the Winnipeg River and the Nelson River to Hudson Bay.

== Tributaries ==
- Sherin Creek (right)
- Anishinabi River (left)
- Wabaskang Lake
  - Aerobus Creek (left)
  - Florence Creek (right)
- Ord River (right)

== See also ==
- List of rivers of Ontario

== Sources ==
- Map 13 (PDF) (Map). 1 : 1,600,000. Official road map of Ontario. Ministry of Transportation of Ontario. 2010-01-01.
