= Cedar Lake (Kenora District) =

Lake in Kenora District, Ontario, Canada

- Location of Cedar Lake in Ontario
- Location: Kenora District, Ontario, Canada
- Coordinates: 50°12′34″N 93°08′17″W
- Primary outflows: Cedar River
- Max. length: 12.5 kilometres (7.8 mi)
- Max. width: 12 kilometres (7 mi)
- Surface elevation: 357 metres (1,171 ft)
- Settlements: Camp Robinson

Cedar Lake is lake in the Nelson River/Hudson Bay drainage basins in Unorganized Kenora District in northwestern Ontario, Canada.

The lake is irregularly-shaped with several large arms. It extends about 12 kilometres (7 mi) east-west and 12.5 kilometres (7.8 mi) north-south. The primary inflow is an unnamed tributary at the south from Double Lake, and the primary outflow is the Cedar River at the north to Church Lake. The Cedar River flows via the English River, Winnipeg River and Nelson River to Hudson Bay.

The unincorporated place and former settlement of Camp Robinson is located on the west arm of the lake, and Ontario Highway 105 runs on the west side of the lake.

== See also ==
- List of lakes in Ontario
