= Crawford Lake (Wright County, Minnesota) =

Lake in the state of Minnesota, United States

- Location within Minnesota
- Location: Wright County, Minnesota
- Coordinates: 45°6′7″N 93°51′37″W
- Type: Lake
- Surface elevation: 922 feet (281 m)

Crawford Lake is a lake in Wright County, in the U.S. state of Minnesota.

Crawford Lake was named for an early settler.

== See also ==
- List of lakes in Minnesota
