= Canu =

Canu may refer to:

- Fabien Canu (born 1960), French judoka
- Ferdinand Canu (1863–1932), French paleontologist and author
- Gabriel Cânu (born 1981), Romanian former footballer
- Stéphane Canu (born 1968), French former footballer
- Yvonne Canu (1921–2008), French painter
