= Canoe Lake (Scarfe Township) =

Lake in Algoma District, Ontario, Canada

Canoe Lake (Blind River)
- Location within Ontario
- Location: Algoma District, Ontario
- Coordinates: 46°16′49″N 83°02′20″W
- Basin countries: Canada
- Max. length: 6 km (3.7 mi)
- Max. width: 1.6 km (0.99 mi)
- Surface elevation: 202 m (663 ft)

Canoe Lake is a lake in geographic Scarfe Township in Algoma District, Ontario, Canada, about 10 kilometres (6 mi) north of the community of Blind River. The lake is shaped like a compressed letter "Z" with the horizontal strokes of the "Z" aligned northwest to southeast. The more northerly arm of the lake is about 4.6 kilometres (2.9 mi) long and the southerly arm 3 kilometres (2 mi). The lake occupies a total envelope of about 6 kilometres (4 mi) by 1.6 kilometres (1.0 mi). The primary inflow and outflow is the Blind River, which leads into Lake Huron. The outflow point is a small hydroelectric dam.

There is a second Canoe Lake in Algoma District further east, Canoe Lake (The North Shore), part of the Serpent River system.

== See also ==
- List of lakes in Ontario
