= Canonto Lake =

Lake in Ontario, Canada

- Location within Ontario
- Location: Ontario
- Coordinates: 45.056°N 76.794°W
- Basin countries: Canada

Canonto Lake is a lake in Frontenac County, Ontario, Canada.

== See also ==
- List of lakes in Ontario
