= Canoe, Kentucky =

Unincorporated community in Kentucky, United States

Canoe
- Unincorporated community
- Location within the state of Kentucky Canoe (the United States)
- Coordinates: 37°26′56″N 83°26′55″W
- Country: United States
- State: Kentucky
- County: Breathitt
- Elevation: 718 ft (219 m)
- Time zone: UTC-5 (Eastern (EST))
  - Summer (DST): UTC-4 (EDT)
- ZIP codes: 41316
- GNIS feature ID: 511206

Canoe is an unincorporated community located in Breathitt County, Kentucky, United States. Its post office closed in 1993.

The origin of the name Canoe is unclear. According to legend, at one point waters were so shallow on nearby Canoe Creek, a canoe had to be abandoned.
