= Crowe Lake =

Lake in Ontario, Canada

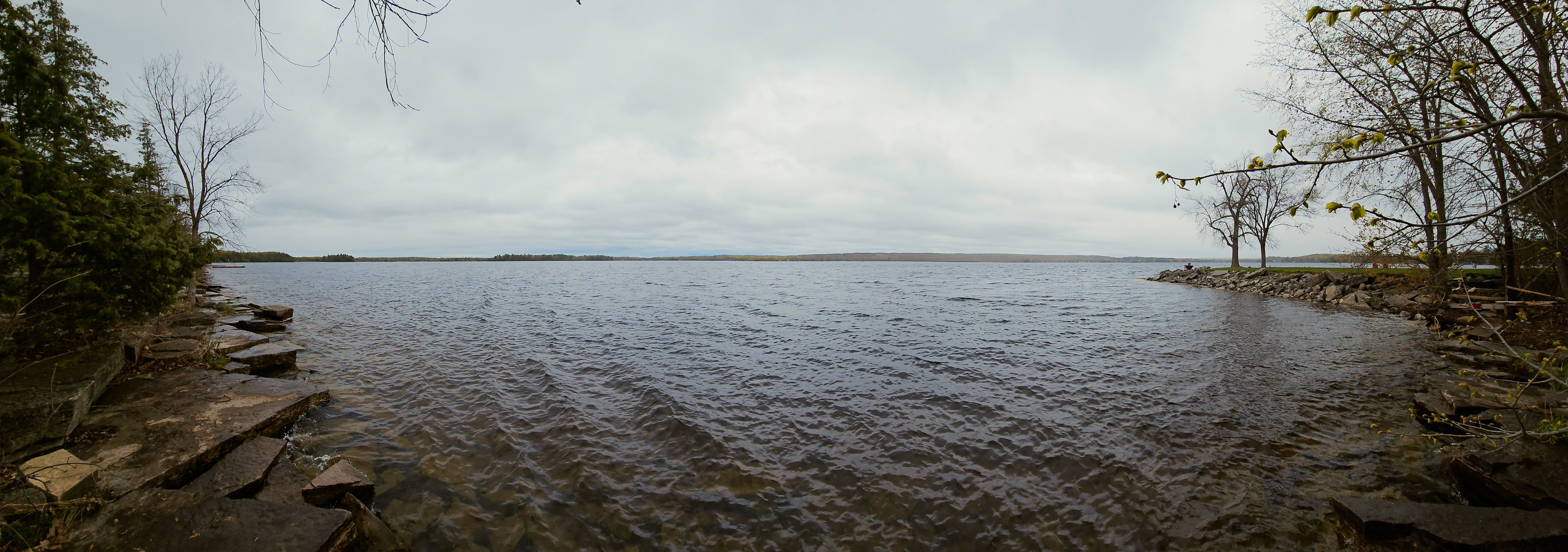

- Location within Southern Ontario
- Location: Peterborough County and Hastings County, Ontario
- Coordinates: 44°28′45″N 77°44′11″W
- Primary inflows: Crowe River
- Primary outflows: Crowe River
- Basin countries: Canada

Crowe Lake is located in Peterborough County, Ontario, Canada. Its total surface area is four square miles. The lake is two miles northwest of Marmora. Its primary inflow is the Crowe River.

Crowe lake contains multiple varieties of fish, including species of walleye, bass, and bluegill. The shore of Crowe Lake is home to Blairton Trailer Park.
