= Canoe Lake (The North Shore) =

Lake in Algoma District, Ontario, Canada

- Location within Ontario
- Location: Algoma District, Ontario
- Coordinates: 46°16′23″N 82°27′40″W
- Basin countries: Canada
- Max. length: 1.6 km (0.99 mi)
- Max. width: 0.4 km (0.25 mi)
- Surface elevation: 245 m (804 ft)

Canoe Lake is a lake in the Township of The North Shore in Algoma District, Ontario, Canada, about 8 kilometres (5 mi) north of Serpent River. The lake is about 1,600 metres (5,249 ft) long and 400 metres (1,312 ft) wide, and the primary outflow is an unnamed creek that leads eventually to Lizard Creek, a tributary of the Serpent River, and thence into Lake Huron.

There is a second Canoe Lake in Algoma District further west, Canoe Lake (Scarfe Township), on the Blind River system.

== See also ==
- List of lakes in Ontario
