= Canoe Lake (Lennox and Addington County) =

Lake in Ontario, Canada

- Location within Ontario
- Location: Addington Highlands, Lennox and Addington County, Ontario, Canada
- Coordinates: 44°59′44″N 77°27′22″W
- Lake type: Endorheic
- Basin countries: Canada
- Max. length: 0.53 km (0.33 mi)
- Max. width: 0.51 km (0.32 mi)
- Surface elevation: 352 m (1,155 ft)

Canoe Lake is a small endorheic lake near the community of Weslemkoon in Addington Highlands in the north and on the western edge of Lennox and Addington County, Ontario, Canada. It is just south-east of the West Bay of Weslemkoon Lake.

== See also ==
- List of lakes in Ontario
