= Crawford Lake (Rainy River District) =

Lake in Rainy River District, Ontario, Canada

- Location of Crawford Lake in Ontario
- Location: Magnetawan, Rainy River District, Ontario
- Coordinates: 48°05′27″N 91°17′21″W
- Primary inflows: Two unnamed creeks
- Primary outflows: Unnamed creek to Carp Lake
- Basin countries: Canada
- Max. length: 1.5 km (0.93 mi)
- Max. width: 0.7 km (0.43 mi)
- Surface elevation: 427 m (1,401 ft)

Crawford Lake is a lake in Rainy River District, Ontario, Canada. It is about 1.5 kilometres (0.9 mi) long and 0.7 kilometres (0.4 mi) wide, and lies at an elevation of 427 metres (1,401 ft).
