= Corrigan Lake (Kenora District) =

Lake in Ontario, Canada

- Location in Ontario
- Location: Kenora District, Ontario
- Coordinates: 49°50′23″N 94°45′13″W
- Part of: Hudson Bay drainage basin
- Primary outflows: Unnamed creek
- Basin countries: Canada
- Max. length: 750 m (2,461 ft)
- Max. width: 450 m (1,476 ft)
- Surface elevation: 364 m (1,194 ft)

Corrigan Lake is a lake in Kenora District in northwestern Ontario, Canada. It is in the Hudson Bay drainage basin, and lies in the geographic townships of Pelican and Umbach.

There are no inflows. The major outflow, at the east, is an unnamed creek to Culloden Lake, which flows via Culloden Creek, the Winnipeg River and the Nelson River to Hudson Bay.

== See also ==
- List of lakes in Ontario
