= Canoe Lake (Parry Sound District) =

Lake in Ontario, Canada

- Location within Ontario
- Location: Parry Sound District, Ontario
- Coordinates: 45°16′49″N 80°03′01″W
- Primary inflows: Canoe Creek
- Primary outflows: Canoe Creek
- Basin countries: Canada
- Max. length: 1.2 km (0.75 mi)
- Max. width: 0.5 km (0.31 mi)
- Surface elevation: 189 m (620 ft)

Canoe Lake is a lake in Parry Sound District, Ontario, Canada. The lake is about 1,200 metres (3,937 ft) long and 500 metres (1,640 ft) wide, and the primary inflow and outflow is Canoe Creek, which drains into the South Channel of Georgian Bay, Lake Huron.

== See also ==
- List of lakes in Ontario
