= Canoe Lake (Sudbury District) =

Lake in Sudbury District, Ontario, Canada

- Location within Ontario
- Location: Sudbury District, Ontario
- Coordinates: 47°34′45″N 82°04′29″W
- Primary inflows: Yeo Creek
- Primary outflows: Yeo Creek
- Basin countries: Canada
- Max. length: 0.75 km (0.47 mi)
- Max. width: 0.55 km (0.34 mi)

Canoe Lake is a lake in Sudbury District, Ontario, Canada. The lake is shaped like an apostrophe, and is about 750 metres (2,461 ft) long and 550 metres (1,804 ft) wide. The primary inflow, at the northeast, and outflow, at the southwest, is Yeo Creek.
