= Canoe Lake (Barnard Creek) =

Lake in Ontario, Canada

- Location within Ontario
- Location: Thunder Bay District, Ontario
- Coordinates: 50°13′45″N 90°48′45″W
- Primary inflows: Barnard Creek
- Primary outflows: Barnard Creek
- Basin countries: Canada
- Max. length: 5.7 km (3.5 mi)
- Surface elevation: 425 m (1,394 ft)

Canoe Lake is in Thunder Bay District, Ontario, Canada, about 7.5 kilometres (4.7 mi) west of Savant Lake. It is shaped like a backwards "C", with a curved length of about 5.7 kilometres (3.5 mi). Its primary inflow, at the northwest corner, and outflow, at the southwest corner, is Barnard Creek, a tributary of the Sturgeon River. The Canadian National Railway transcontinental mainline travels along the north side of the lake.
