= Crawford Lake (Sudbury District) =

Lake in Sudbury District, Ontario, Canada

- Location of Crawford Lake in Ontario
- Location: Sudbury District, Ontario
- Coordinates: 48°08′22″N 81°58′06″W
- Primary inflows: Unnamed creek from Hanrahan Lake
- Primary outflows: Crawford River
- Basin countries: Canada
- Max. length: 0.7 km (0.43 mi)
- Max. width: 0.5 km (0.31 mi)
- Surface elevation: 361 m (1,184 ft)

Crawford Lake is a lake in the Moose River drainage basin in Sudbury District, Ontario, Canada. It is about 0.7 kilometres (0.4 mi) long and 0.5 kilometres (0.3 mi) wide, and lies at an elevation of 361 metres (1,184 ft) about 10 kilometres (6 mi) south of Ontario Highway 101 and 27 kilometres (17 mi) west of Ontario Highway 144.

The primary inflow is an unnamed creek from Hanrahan Lake at the west. The primary outflow, at the east, is the Crawford River, which flows via the Nat River, Groundhog River, Mattagami River and Moose River to James Bay.
