= Camp Robinson, Ontario =

Camp Robinson
- Location of Camp Robinson in Ontario
- Coordinates: 50°07′50″N 93°13′11″W
- Country: Canada
- Province: Ontario
- Region: Northwestern Ontario
- District: Kenora
- Part: Kenora, Unorganized
- Founded: 1947
- Elevation: 394 m (1,293 ft)
- Time zone: UTC-6 (Central Time Zone)
  - Summer (DST): UTC-5 (Central Time Zone)
- Postal code FSA: P0V
- Area code: 807

Camp Robinson is an unincorporated place and former settlement in Unorganized Kenora District in northwestern Ontario, Canada. It is located on Moose Lake about 3 kilometres (1.9 mi) east of Ontario Highway 105 and 33 kilometres (21 mi) north of Vermilion Bay.

== History ==
The camp was created as Camp 69 on Moose Lake, Ontario in 1947. Established by the Minnesota and Ontario Paper Company to house woodland workers and their families, Camp Robinson was named in honor of Mr. RHM Robinson, the then President of the company.

The camp had over 30 homes that were four room bungalows which were first painted green. These small houses created low rent homes for the company's workers and their families. A two-room school was built to house 50 students overseen by Mr. Edwin Sweet, teacher/principal. Mr. Sweet was assisted by Mrs. Iola Seed. Eventually, a bakery, butcher shop, a laundry, a small infirmary with a registered nurse were all located in the camp. For entertainment, the camp had its own curling rink and baseball diamond and for spiritual needs: a church.

The camp had its own power generation using large diesel powered generator sets. The company's woodland garage was located in the camp to service all the equipment from surrounding woodlands operations. The camp even had its own sewage system.

Camp Robinson was in existence for over 30 years until its demise in 1980. The end for the camp was in the works since the takeover of the company by Boise Cascade, as they had planned to replace the workers (represented by the Lumber and Sawmill Union) with independent owner operators of log skidding equipment. The eventual announcement caused a strike to start in 1978 and the last family, Beverley and Stanley Sandmoen, left the camp in 1980. The camp was leveled and buried by Boise Cascade and trees were planted over the site.
