= Canoe Lake (Madawaska Valley) =

Lake in Renfrew County, Ontario, Canada

- Location within Ontario
- Location: Combermere, Renfrew County, Ontario
- Coordinates: 45°21′49″N 77°36′04″W
- Basin countries: Canada
- Max. length: 0.6 km (0.37 mi)
- Max. width: 0.3 km (0.19 mi)
- Surface elevation: 285 m (935 ft)

Canoe Lake is a lake in the Township of Madawaska Valley in Combermere, Renfrew County, Ontario, Canada. It is 600 metres (1,969 ft) long and 300 metres (984 ft) wide, and the primary outflow is an unnamed creek to Negeek Lake on the Madawaska River.

There is a second Canoe Lake in Renfrew County that is also part of the Madawaska system, Canoe Lake (Greater Madawaska), on the Highland Creek tributary further downstream.
