= Blind River (Ontario) =

River in Ontario, Canada

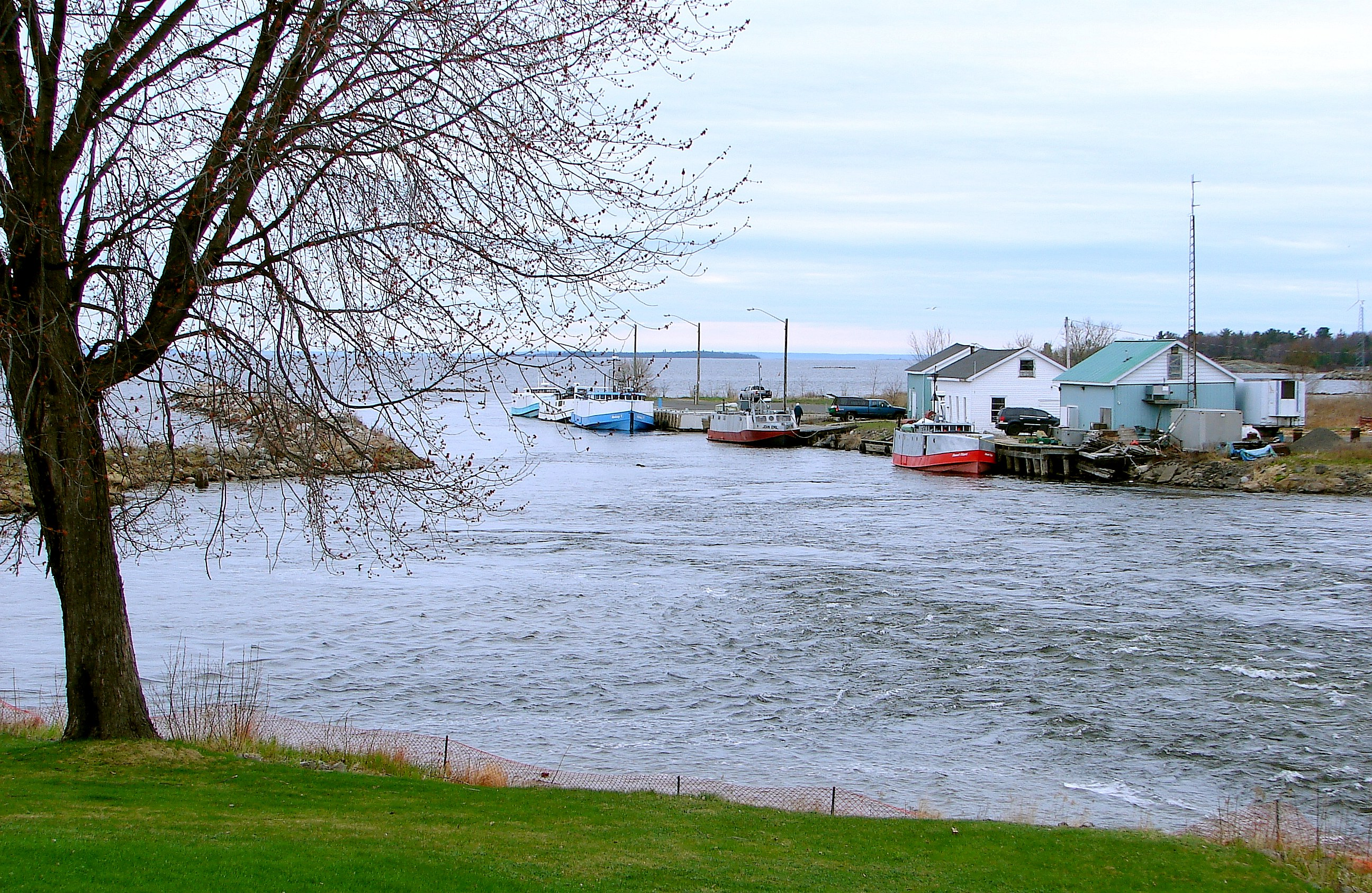
- Mouth of Blind River

- Location of the mouth of the Blind River in Ontario
- Native name: Biniwaabikong (Ojibwe)

Location
- Country: Canada
- Province: Ontario
- Region: Northeastern Ontario
- District: Algoma
- Municipality: Blind River

Physical characteristics
- Source: Pathfinder Lake
  - coordinates: 46°29′21″N 82°54′03″W
  - elevation: 381 m (1,250 ft)
- Mouth: North Channel
  - location: Blind River
  - coordinates: 46°10′47″N 82°58′37″W
  - elevation: 176 m (577 ft)

Basin features
- River system: Great Lakes Basin
- Tributaries
  - right: Potomac River

The Blind River is a river in Algoma District in Northeastern Ontario, Canada. The river is in the Great Lakes Basin and is a tributary of Lake Huron.

The Blind River Provincial Park is a waterway park protecting the river, its banks, and the lakes along its way from its headwaters at Stone Lake to Matinenda Lake. Additionally, it includes the streams and lakes that make up the Flack Lake Figure Eight and the Dunlop Lake–Mace Lake Canoe Routes. It was established in 2004 and is meant for canoe camping, boating, fishing, hunting and wildlife/nature watching. Features in the park include wetlands, large islands, a scenic canyon and waterfalls at the inlet to Matinenda Lake.

The park is regionally significant due to its cold water aquatic environments and its headwater protection function. It borders the Matinenda Provincial Park to the South. It is a non-operating park, meaning that there are no services. The only facilities are backcountry campsites.

== See also ==
- List of rivers of Ontario

== Sources ==
- Map 7 (PDF) (Map). 1 : 700,000. Official road map of Ontario. Ministry of Transportation of Ontario. 2014.
- Restructured municipalities - Ontario map #4 (Map). Restructuring Maps of Ontario. Ontario Ministry of Municipal Affairs and Housing. 2006. Archived from the original on 2014-04-10.
- "Toporama - Topographic Map Sheet 52L11". Atlas of Canada. Natural Resources Canada. Archived from the original on 2010-08-31.
