= Canoe Lake (Kenora District) =

Lake in Ontario, Canada

- Location within Ontario
- Location: Kenora District, Ontario, Canada
- Coordinates: 49°37′22″N 94°55′41″W
- Primary outflows: Unnamed creek to Shoal Lake
- Basin countries: Canada
- Max. length: 1.5 km (0.93 mi)
- Surface elevation: 335 m (1,099 ft)

Canoe Lake is a V-shaped lake in Kenora District, Ontario, Canada, just east of the border with Manitoba and 11 kilometres (7 mi) south of Highway 17. The two sides of the "V" are about 1.5 kilometres (0.9 mi) long, and the primary outflow is an unnamed creek to Shoal Lake, part of the Winnipeg River and ultimately the Nelson River drainage basin. There are portages from it to both Shoal Lake and Lake of the Woods.

== See also ==
- List of lakes in Ontario
