= Canoe Lake (Syine Township) =

Lake in Ontario, Canada

- Location of the lake in Ontario
- Location: Thunder Bay District, Ontario
- Coordinates: 48°51′11″N 86°57′44″W
- Part of: Lake Superior drainage basin
- Primary outflows: unnamed stream to Fishnet Creek
- Basin countries: Canada
- Max. length: 700 m (2,300 ft)
- Max. width: 500 m (1,600 ft)
- Surface elevation: 234 m (768 ft)

Canoe Lake (French: lac Canoe) is a lake in geographic Syine Township in the Unorganized Part of Thunder Bay District, Ontario, Canada, about 12.5 kilometres (7.8 mi) northeast of the municipality of Terrace Bay.

The lake has a number of unnamed tributaries, and has as its outflow an unnamed west branching of Fishnet Creek that leads to Jackfish Lake, and thence by a short channel into Lake Superior. It is 700 metres (2,297 ft) long, 500 metres (1,640 ft) wide, and lies at an elevation of 234 m (768 ft). Ontario Highway 17 travels along the north shore of the lake.
