= Crawford Lake (Milner Township) =

Lake in Timiskaming District, Ontario, Canada

- Location of Crawford Lake in Ontario
- Location: Timiskaming District, Ontario
- Coordinates: 47°36′10″N 80°50′11″W
- Primary outflows: Unnamed creek to Long Lake
- Basin countries: Canada
- Max. length: .87 km (0.54 mi)
- Max. width: .62 km (0.39 mi)
- Surface elevation: 374 m (1,227 ft)

Crawford Lake is a lake in geographic Milner Township in the Montreal River and Ottawa River drainage basins in Timiskaming District, Ontario, Canada. It is about 0.87 kilometres (0.5 mi) long and 0.62 kilometres (0.4 mi) wide, and lies at an elevation of 374 metres (1,227 ft) about 7 kilometres (4 mi) southwest of the community of Gowganda. The primary outflow, at the northeast, is an unnamed creek to Long Lake, which flows via Gowganda Lake and the Montreal River to Lake Timiskaming on the Ottawa River.

A second Crawford Lake in Timiskaming District and also in the same drainage basins, Crawford Lake (Haultain Township), lies just 15 kilometres (9 mi) northeast.
