= Marmora, Ontario =

Marmora
- Unincorporated community
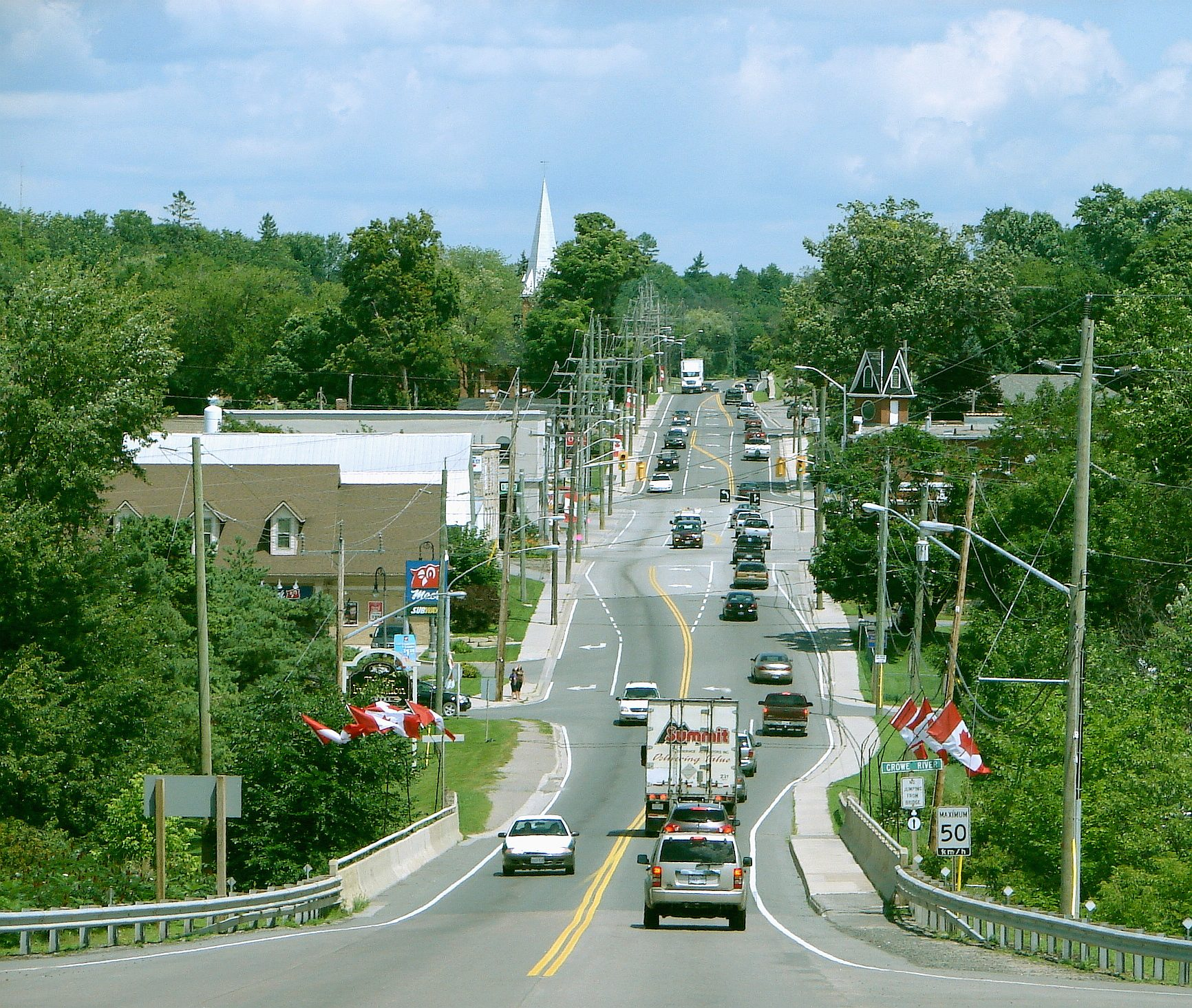
- Etymology: Latin for "marble"
- Location in southern Ontario
- Coordinates: 44°29′00″N 77°41′00″W
- Country: Canada
- Province: Ontario
- County: Hastings
- Municipality: Marmora and Lake
- Founded: 1821
- Incorporated: 1901 (as Village)
- Dissolved: 2001 (amalgamated)

Area
  - Land: 2.15 km^{2} (0.83 sq mi)

Population (2021)
  - Total: 1,499
  - Density: 697.2/km^{2} (1,806/sq mi)
- Time zone: UTC-5 (EST)
  - Summer (DST): UTC-4 (EDT)
- Postal code: K0K 2M0
- Area code: 613

Marmora is the largest community in the Municipality of Marmora and Lake in Hastings County, Ontario, Canada. It is located on the Crowe River and along Highway 7 between Havelock to the west and Madoc to the east, about the halfway point between Ottawa and Toronto.

== History ==
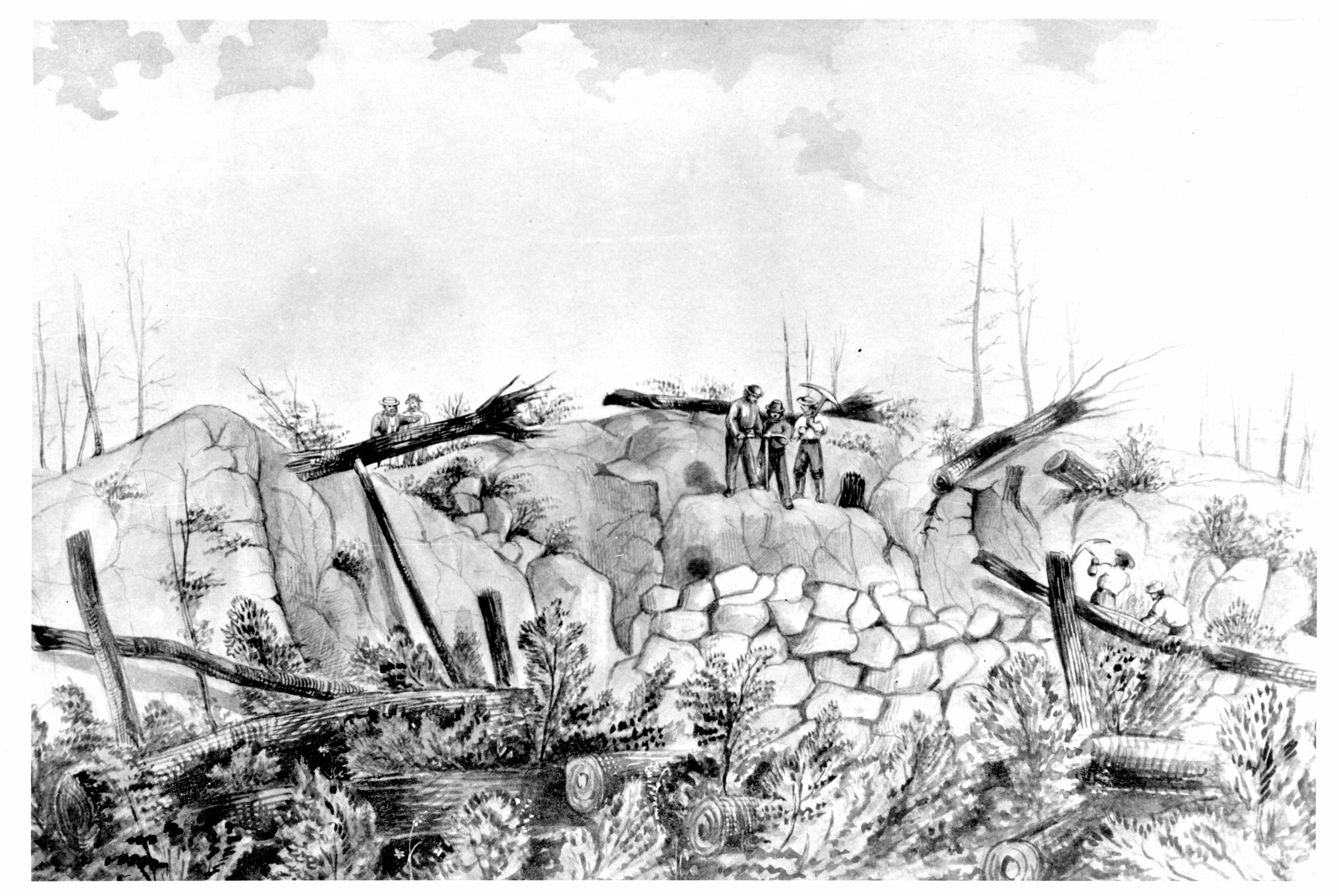
Sketch of first mine in Marmora

The rich history of Marmora Township is the story of mining in Eastern Ontario. Since 1820 this Township has played a leading role in the development of iron mining. In addition, copper, lead, silver, gold and lithographic limestone have been extracted.

Iron mining was an important industry in the area during the 19th century. The village was originally named Marmora Iron Works. Gold and silver were also mined at nearby Cordova Mines. A nearby plant processes talc and dolomite.

In 1821, the newly surveyed townships of Elzevir, Madoc and Marmora were added to Hastings County, on the initiative of Charles Hayes, an Irish entrepreneur, in return for his setting up the Marmora Iron Works.

The new Township of Marmora took its name from the Latin word for marble because of an "immense rock of most delicate white marble". This giant rock stood on the southeast corner of Crowe Lake, which took its name from the Crowe First Nations that lived along the shore.

Marmora Township was opened for sale in 1821, but there was little settlement outside of the newly created mining village.

The hamlet of Marmora was separated from the Township and incorporated as a village in 1901. It was re-amalgamated with the surrounding townships of Marmora and Lake in 2001 to form a newly expanded Municipality of Marmora and Lake.

== Demographics ==
Historical census populations – Marmora, Ontario

Year	Pop.	±%
1921	948	—
1931	996	+5.1%
1941	1,106	+11.0%
1951	1,117	+1.0%
1956	1,428	+27.8%
1961	1,381	−3.3%

Year	Pop.	±%
1966	1,331	−3.6%
1971	1,350	+1.4%
1976	1,336	−1.0%
1981	1,304	−2.4%
1986	1,255	−3.8%
1991	1,397	+11.3%

Year	Pop.	±%
1996	1,483	+6.2%
2001	1,589	+7.1%
2006	1,482	−6.7%
2011	1,466	−1.1%
2016	1,639	+11.8%
2021	1,499	−8.5%

Population figures prior to 2001 are for the village municipality, and after 2001 for the population centre of Marmora.
2011 and 2016 Population figures based on revised counts.
Source: Statistics Canada

== Notable residents ==
- Yaphet Kotto - actor
- Greg Terrion - Toronto Maple Leafs hockey player
