= Canoe Lake (Greater Madawaska) =

Lake in Renfrew County, Ontario, Canada

- Location within Ontario
- Location: Renfrew County, Ontario
- Coordinates: 45°18′58″N 77°14′20″W
- Primary outflows: Highland Creek
- Basin countries: Canada
- Max. length: 0.6 km (0.37 mi)
- Max. width: 0.16 km (0.099 mi)
- Surface elevation: 285 m (935 ft)

Canoe Lake is a lake in the Township of Greater Madawaska in Renfrew County, Ontario, Canada. It is 600 metres (1,969 ft) long and 160 metres (525 ft) wide, and the primary outflow is Highland Creek, a tributary of the Madawaska River. The lake is about 9 kilometres (6 mi) north of Griffith.

There is a second Canoe Lake in Renfrew County that is also part of the Madawaska system, Canoe Lake (Madawaska Valley), that enters the Madawaska via an unnamed creek further upstream.
