= Crawford Lake (Cochrane District) =

Lake in Cochrane District, Ontario, Canada

- Location of Crawford Lake in Ontario
- Location: Cochrane District, Ontario
- Coordinates: 50°41′46″N 83°16′03″W
- Primary outflows: Unnamed creek
- Basin countries: Canada
- Max. length: 1.56 km (0.97 mi)
- Max. width: .81 km (0.50 mi)
- Surface elevation: 169 m (554 ft)

Crawford Lake is a lake in the Albany River drainage basin in Cochrane District, Ontario, Canada. It is about 1.56 kilometres (0.97 mi) long and .81 kilometres (0.50 mi) wide, and lies at an elevation of 169 metres (554 ft). The primary outflow is an unnamed creek which flows via the Cheepay River and the Albany River to James Bay.

== See also ==
- List of lakes in Ontario
