= Canoe Lake (Timiskaming District) =

Lake in Ontario, Canada

- Location within Ontario
- Location: Timiskaming District, Ontario
- Coordinates: 48°05′45″N 80°34′01″W
- Primary inflows: Tent Creek
- Primary outflows: Tent Creek
- Basin countries: Canada
- Max. length: 1.2 km (0.75 mi)
- Max. width: 0.4 km (0.25 mi)
- Surface elevation: 343 m (1,125 ft)

Canoe Lake is a lake in Timiskaming District, Ontario, Canada, about 19 kilometres (12 mi) north of Matachewan and 40 kilometres (25 mi) west of Kirkland Lake. It is 1,200 metres (3,937 ft) long and 400 metres (1,312 ft) wide, and the primary inflow and outflow is Tent Creek. The lake is part of the Montreal River drainage basin, and hence part of the Ottawa River drainage basin.
