= Corrigan Lake (Sudbury District) =

Lake in Ontario, Canada

- Location in Ontario
- Location: Sudbury District, Ontario
- Coordinates: 47°31′07″N 83°41′05″W
- Part of: Great Lakes Basin
- Primary outflows: Unnamed creek
- Basin countries: Canada
- Max. length: 770 m (2,526 ft)
- Max. width: 660 m (2,165 ft)
- Surface elevation: 438 m (1,437 ft)

Corrigan Lake is a lake in western Sudbury District in northwestern Ontario, Canada. It is in the Great Lakes Basin, and lies in the geographic township of Genier.

There are no inflows. The major outflow, at the east, is an unnamed creek to Puswawa Lake, which flows via Puswawa Creek and the Montreal River to Lake Superior.
