= Canoe Lake (Frontenac County) =

Lake in Ontario, Canada

- Location within Ontario
- Location: South Frontenac, Frontenac County, Ontario
- Coordinates: 44°35′30″N 76°32′43″W
- Basin countries: Canada
- Max. length: 7.5 km (4.7 mi)
- Max. width: 0.4 km (0.25 mi)
- Surface elevation: 141 m (463 ft)

Canoe Lake is a lake in South Frontenac, Frontenac County, Ontario, Canada, just south of the community of Fermoy. The lake is about 7.5 kilometres (5 mi) long and .4 kilometres (0.2 mi) wide.

== See also ==
- List of lakes in Ontario
