= Crawford Lake (Haultain Township) =

Lake in Timiskaming District, Ontario, Canada

- Location of Crawford Lake in Ontario
- Location: Timiskaming District, Ontario
- Coordinates: 47°42′03″N 80°40′58″W
- Primary inflows: Unnamed creek
- Primary outflows: Unnamed creek towards Lost Lake
- Basin countries: Canada
- Max. length: .63 km (0.39 mi)
- Max. width: .2 km (0.12 mi)
- Surface elevation: 348 m (1,142 ft)

Crawford Lake is a lake in geographic Haultain Township in the Montreal River and Ottawa River drainage basins in Timiskaming District, Ontario, Canada. It is about 0.63 kilometres (0.4 mi) long and 0.2 kilometres (0.1 mi) wide, and lies at an elevation of 348 metres (1,142 ft) about 8 kilometres (5 mi) northeast of the community of Gowganda. A short unnamed creek flows in at the north. The primary outflow, at the south, is an unnamed creek towards Lost Lake, which flows via Calcite Creek, Sydney Creek and the Montreal River to Lake Timiskaming on the Ottawa River.

A second Crawford Lake in Timiskaming District and also in the same drainage basins, Crawford Lake (Milner Township), lies just 15 kilometres (9 mi) southwest.
