= Black Lake (Marchington River) =

Lake in Kenora District, Ontario, Canada

- lac Black
- Location in Ontario
- Location: Kenora District, Ontario
- Coordinates: 50°08′35″N 91°36′00″W
- Part of: Hudson Bay drainage basin
- Primary outflows: Unnamed creek to Botsford Lake
- Basin countries: Canada
- Max. length: 2.0 kilometres (1.2 mi)
- Max. width: 0.6 kilometres (0.4 mi)
- Surface elevation: 372 metres (1,220 ft)

Black Lake (French: lac Black) is a lake in the Hudson Bay drainage basin in the Unorganized Part of Kenora District in Northwestern Ontario, Canada. It is about 2 kilometres (1.2 mi) long and 0.6 kilometres (0.4 mi) wide and lies at an elevation of 372 metres (1,220 ft), 13 kilometres (8.1 mi) northeast of Superior Junction and Highway 642, 4 kilometres (2 mi) southwest of McDougall Mills and 1.3 kilometres (0.8 mi) south of Rosnel. The primary outflow is an unnamed creek north to Botsford Lake on the Marchington River, which flows via the English River, the Winnipeg River and the Nelson River to Hudson Bay. The CN transcontinental rail line crosses the creek between Black Lake and Botsford Lake.

== See also ==
- List of lakes in Ontario
