= Lake of Bays (Kenora District) =

Lake in Kenora District, Ontario, Canada

- Location in Ontario
- Location: Kenora District, Ontario
- Coordinates: 49°59′03″N 91°17′16″W
- Primary inflows: Bays River, Lake of Bays River
- Primary outflows: Lake of Bays River
- Basin countries: Canada
- Max. length: 25 kilometres (16 mi)
- Max. width: 8 kilometres (5.0 mi)
- Surface elevation: 388 metres (1,273 ft)

Lake of Bays is a lake in Kenora District in Northwestern Ontario, Canada in the Hudson Bay drainage basin. The primary inflows are the Bays River at the southeast, and the Lake of Bays River at the northeast; the primary outflow is the Lake of Bays River at the north, which flows via the Sturgeon River, Marchington River, English River, Winnipeg River, and Nelson River to Hudson Bay.

== See also ==
- List of lakes in Ontario
