= East English River Provincial Park =

Provincial park in Ontario, Canada

- IUCN category II (national park)
- Location within Ontario
- Location: Kenora District, Ontario, Canada
- Coordinates: 49°46′26″N 91°29′13″W
- Area: 17,513.00 ha (67.6181 sq mi)
- Designation: Waterway
- Established: 2003
- Governing body: Ontario Parks
- Website: www.ontarioparks.com/park/eastenglishriver

The East English River Provincial Park is a linear waterway park in Kenora District, Ontario, Canada. It includes a 200 metres (660 ft) wide strip of land on both sides of the English River and its lakes, from the intersection of Highway 599 to Minnitaki Lake. It was established in 2003 to protect natural features, that are representative of the area, and high quality recreational canoe routes with over 30 sets of rapids. The park's notable features include white pine forest at the northern extent of its range, white elm and burr oak, caribou habitat and calving locations, fisheries, and archaeological sites.

== Description ==
The park includes all the shores and waters of (in upstream order) Loggers, Flying Loon, Press, Hughes, Hut, and Barrel Lakes, as well as partially Jarvis Lake. It borders on the Upper English River Conservation Reserve that follows the river eastwards and eventually, via the Shikag River, connects with the Brightsand River Provincial Park.

The section of the English River within the park and upstream to its source is notable for its unregulated flow and unpolluted waters, unique for a large river system in northwestern Ontario. Its minimum flow is 28 cubic metres per second (990 cu ft/s) in April, while it increases to a peak flow of 117 cubic metres per second (4,100 cu ft/s) in late May.

There are several pictograph locations within the park, likely dating back to the Woodland Culture. The area was extensively logged in the 20th century and many relics remain of former logging operations. A POW camp was located on Press Lake during World War II.

It is a non-operating park without any facilities or services, but there is a commercial outfitter on Press Lake. The park can be used for recreational activities such as boating, backcountry camping, canoeing, fishing, hiking, swimming, and hunting. It is accessible via Highway 599 and former logging roads.

== Flora and fauna ==
The flora and fauna is typical of southern boreal forest with some Great Lakes-St. Lawrence forest features (such as red pine, white pine, and blackcurrant). A total of 269 vascular plant species have been identified in the park. Significant plant species include the provincially-rare fir clubmoss (Huperzia selago) and interior rush (Juncus interior).

Wildlife in the park includes 81 species of birds (such as common loon and osprey), 14 species of mammals (such as white-tailed deer, moose, American black bear, and timber wolf), 2 reptiles, 4 amphibians, 16 odonates, and 21 fish species (such as lake whitefish, northern pike, smallmouth bass, walleye, and yellow perch). Provincially rare animal species present are the bald eagle (Haliaeetus leucocephalus), rusty snaketail (Ophiogomphus rupinsulensis), and delicate emerald (Somatochlora franklini).

== See also ==
- West English River Provincial Park - provincial park to the west on the same river
