= Botsford Lake (Ontario) =

Lake in Ontario, Canada

- Location in Ontario
- Location: Kenora District, Ontario
- Coordinates: 50°08′19″N 91°39′33″W
- Part of: Hudson Bay drainage basin
- Primary inflows: Marchington River
- River sources: Marchington River
- Basin countries: Canada
- Max. length: 15 km (9.3 mi)
- Max. width: 2.2 km (1.4 mi)
- Surface elevation: 357 m (1,171 ft)

Botsford Lake is a lake in the Hudson Bay drainage basin in Kenora District in northwestern Ontario, Canada. It is about 15 kilometres (9 mi) long and 2.2 kilometres (1.4 mi) wide, is at an elevation of 357 metres (1,171 ft), and lies between the settlements of Superior Junction and McDougall Mills; Rosnel is on the south shore of the lake. The CN transcontinental rail line travels the along the entire south shore. Highway 642 runs west of the lake, and Highway 516 runs approximately parallel to the north shore of the lake at a distance of about 6 kilometres (4 mi).

The primary inflow and outflow is the Marchington River, coming in at the northeast end of the lake just downstream of McDougall Falls, and exiting at the southwest end a few kilometres upstream of the river's mouth at Abram Lake on the English River. A secondary inflow, at the south, is an unnamed creek coming from Black Lake.

== See also ==
- List of lakes in Ontario
