= Lake of Bays (disambiguation) =

Lake of Bays is a township within the District Municipality of Muskoka, Ontario, Canada.

Lake of Bays may also refer to:

- Lake of Bays (Kenora District), lake in Kenora District
- Lake of Bays (Muskoka lake), lake in Muskoka District
- Lake of Bays River, river in Kenora District
