= Robinson, Ontario =

Robinson is the name of a neighbourhood and two unincorporated communities in the Canadian province of Ontario:

- Robinson, Greater Sudbury;
- Robinson, Kenora District, Ontario; and
- Robinson, Manitoulin District, Ontario.
