= Marchington Lake =

Lake in Ontario, Canada

- Location within Ontario
- Location: Kenora District, Ontario
- Coordinates: 50°11′17″N 91°24′24″W
- Primary inflows: Marchington River, Sturgeon River, North River
- Primary outflows: Marchington River
- Basin countries: Canada
- Max. length: 22.5 km (14.0 mi)
- Max. width: 2.5 km (1.6 mi)
- Surface area: 81 km^{2} (31 sq mi)
- Shore length^{1}: 81 km (50.3 mi)
- Surface elevation: 362 m (1,188 ft)
- ^{1} Shore length is not a well-defined measure.

Marchington Lake is a lake in the Hudson Bay drainage basin located near Sioux Lookout in the Kenora District of northwestern Ontario, Canada.

Derived its name from John Samuels son William Marchington. William, who was a Parliamentary writer and later editor of Canada's national newspaper the 'Globe & Mail'. William also wrote for a couple of English newspapers. William had a golfing buddy who was a Cartographer, and as such he asked to use William's surname to name areas in the 'back country' of Ontario.

== Hydrology ==
The lake lies roughly south-west to north-east, a distance of 22.5 km (14.0 mi). There are two major bays on the lake: Northeast Bay, which forms the north-east end, and McDougall Bay, which forms a large hook at the south-west corner. Another arm forms a 5 km (3.1 mi) spike leading south-east from Northeast Bay.

The Marchington River flows into the lake at McDougall Bay and is also the outflow of the lake, at the south-west corner at McDougall Mills. The Sturgeon River is another main source, and flows into the lake at the spike-shaped arm at the south-eastern end. The North River flows into the middle of the lake on the north-west side. Other inflows are (clockwise from north-east) Watin Creek, Kinniwap Creek, Mall Creek, Martin Creek and Kee Creek. The Marchington River flows via the English River, the Winnipeg River and the Nelson River to Hudson Bay.

== Economy ==
The CN transcontinental main line crosses the lake at its south-eastern arm near Robinson, travels inland, then continues along the south-west corner of the lake past Ghost River and McDougall Mills.

== See also ==
- List of lakes in Ontario
