= Tetu =

Tetu may refer to:

== Places ==
- Tetu Constituency, an electoral constituency in Kenya
  - Tetu, Kenya, an administrative division in Nyeri County, Kenya
- Tetu Lake, a lake of Ontario, Canada.

== Other uses ==
- Têtu, a French gay magazine
- a Marathi name for Oroxylum indicum
- Tetu Nakamura, a Japanese film actor
