= Drive Lake =

Lake in Kenora District, Ontario, Canada

- lac Drive
- Location in Ontario
- Location: Kenora District, Ontario
- Coordinates: 50°19′52″N 91°10′42″W
- Primary outflows: Drive Creek
- Basin countries: Canada
- Max. length: 1.25 km (0.78 mi)
- Max. width: 0.49 km (0.30 mi)
- Surface elevation: 394 m (1,293 ft)

Drive Lake (French: lac Drive) is a lake in the Nelson River drainage basin in the Unorganized Part of Kenora District in northwestern Ontario, Canada. It is about 1,250 metres (4,101 ft) long and 490 metres (1,608 ft) wide, lies at an elevation of 394 metres (1,293 ft), and is 1 kilometre (0.6 mi) north of Highway 516. Drive Lake is the source of Drive Creek; the creek leaves the lake at its eastern tip and flows into the Marchington River.

== See also ==
- List of lakes in Ontario
