= Lake of Bays River =

- Location of the mouth of the Lake of Bays River in Ontario

Location
- Country: Canada
- Province: Ontario
- Region: Northwestern Ontario
- District: Kenora

Physical characteristics
- Source: Unnamed lake
  - coordinates: 48°16′50″N 79°42′03″W
  - elevation: 450 m (1,480 ft)
- Mouth: Conver Lake, on the Sturgeon River
  - coordinates: 50°06′54″N 91°10′32″W
  - elevation: 375 m (1,230 ft)

Basin features
- River system: Nelson River drainage basin

The Lake of Bays River is a river in Kenora District in Northwestern Ontario, Canada. It is in the Hudson Bay drainage basin and is a left tributary of the Sturgeon River.

== Course ==
The river begins at an unnamed lake just west of Ontario Highway 599 and just west of the border with Thunder Bay District. It heads north, then west through Rome Lake, Gibraltar Lake, Malta Lake and Handcuff Lake to the Lake of Bays, where it takes in the left tributaries Dominion River and Bays River. It then heads north, and reaches its mouth at Conver Lake on the Sturgeon River. The Sturgeon River flows via the Marchington River, English River, Winnipeg River, and Nelson River to Hudson Bay.

== Tributaries ==
- Lake of Bays
  - Dominion River (left)
  - Bays River (left)

== See also ==
- List of rivers of Ontario

== Sources ==
- Map 13 (PDF) (Map). 1 : 1,600,000. Official road map of Ontario. Ministry of Transportation of Ontario. 2014.
