= McDougall Mills, Ontario =

McDougall Mills
- Location of McDougall Mills in Ontario
- Coordinates: 50°10′06″N 91°32′43″W
- Country: Canada
- Province: Ontario
- Region: Northwestern Ontario
- District: Kenora
- Part: Kenora, Unorganized
- Elevation: 370 m (1,210 ft)
- Time zone: UTC-6 (Central Time Zone)
  - Summer (DST): UTC-5 (Central Time Zone)
- Postal code FSA: P0T
- Area code: 807

McDougall Mills is an unincorporated place on the Marchington River between Botsford Lake and the McDougall Falls downstream and Marchington Lake upstream in Unorganized Kenora District in northwestern Ontario, Canada.

It lies on the Canadian National Railway transcontinental main line, between Rosnel to the west and Ghost River to the east, and is passed by Via Rail transcontinental Canadian trains.
