= Superior Junction, Ontario =

Superior Junction
- Location of Superior Junction in Ontario
- Coordinates: 50°05′52″N 91°46′40″W
- Country: Canada
- Province: Ontario
- Region: Northwestern Ontario
- District: Kenora
- Town: Sioux Lookout
- Elevation: 364 m (1,194 ft)
- Time zone: UTC-6 (Central Time Zone)
  - Summer (DST): UTC-5 (Central Time Zone)
- Postal code FSA: P0V
- Area code: 807

Superior Junction is a community in the town of Sioux Lookout, Kenora District in northwestern Ontario, Canada. It is on the Marchington River downstream of Botsford Lake and upstream of the river's mouth at Abram Lake on the English River.

== Transportation ==
Superior Junction lies on the Canadian National Railway transcontinental main line, between the centre of the town of Sioux Lookout to the west and Rosnel to the east, has a passing track, and is passed but not served by Via Rail transcontinental Canadian trains. It is also at the junction of a CN branch line that heads to and comes from Thunder Bay at the southeast; the next point on the line is the Alcona flag stop

Ontario Highway 642 crosses the Marchington River and CN main line at Superior Junction.
