= West English River Provincial Park =

Provincial park in Ontario, Canada

West English Provincial Park
- IUCN category II (national park)
- Location within Ontario
- Location: Kenora District, Ontario, Canada
- Coordinates: 50°25′43″N 93°52′34″W
- Area: 22,922.00 ha (88.5023 sq mi)
- Elevation: 382 m (1,253 ft)
- Designation: Waterway
- Established: 2003
- Named for: English River
- Governing body: Ontario Parks
- Website: https://www.ontarioparks.com/park/westenglishriver

West English River Provincial Park is a provincial park in Kenora District, Ontario, Canada. It spans 65 kilometres (40 mi) along the English River from Barnston Lake to Tide Lake and also includes all the shores and waters of Wegg, Goose, Wilcox, Unexpected, Oak, and Maynard Lakes. The park's notable features include old growth red and white pine stands at the northern extent of their range, and migmatites that are provincially-significant examples of metatexitic and diatexitic metasedimentary rocks. It borders on Tide Lake and Maynard Lake Provincial Nature Reserves.

It can be accessed via Highway 671 and Highway 804.

Flora and fauna are mostly typical of the southern boreal forest. Almost half of the park’s forests consist of fir-spruce mixedwood. 307 vascular plant species have been identified, of which 18 are provincially rare species. 16 species of mammals, 76 birds, 5 amphibians, 2 reptiles, and 18 odonates have been found, including the following 6 provincially-rare species: woodland caribou, bald eagle, American white pelican, elusive clubtail, Williamson’s emerald, and lake sturgeon. Predominant fish species in the park are bass, ciscoes, mooneye, muskellunge, perch, pike, sauger, and walleye.

The river inside this park is affected by 2 dams (Manitou Dam and Caribou Falls Dam) that have an unnatural flow regime with a water level peak in October (typically peak is in May for unregulated rivers). This has probably had a negative impact on vegetation, wildlife, and shoreline erosion. The lakes, making up 66% of the park's area, are mesotrophic and relatively turbid.

It is a non-operating park without any facilities or services, but there are some commercial outfitters on Unexpected and Maynard Lakes. The park can be used for recreational activities such as boating, backcountry camping, canoeing, fishing, hiking, swimming, and hunting.

== See also ==
- East English River Provincial Park – provincial park to the east on the same river
