= Tripoli Creek (Kenora District) =

Tripoli Creek ruisseau Tripoli
- Location of the mouth of Tripoli Creek in Ontario

Location
- Country: Canada
- Province: Ontario
- Region: Northwestern Ontario
- District: Kenora

Physical characteristics
- Source: Tripoli Lake
  - coordinates: 50°20′23″N 91°05′09″W
  - elevation: 396 m (1,299 ft)
- Mouth: Drive Creek (Ontario)
  - coordinates: 50°20′50″N 91°08′58″W
  - elevation: 390 m (1,280 ft)
- Length: 6.6 km (4.1 mi)

Basin features
- River system: Nelson River drainage basin

Tripoli Creek (French: ruisseau Tripoli) is a creek in the Nelson River drainage basin in Kenora District in northwestern Ontario, Canada. It travels 6.6 kilometres (4.1 mi) from its head at Tripoli Lake at an elevation of 396 metres (1,299 ft) to Drive Creek at an elevation of 390 metres (1,280 ft), just upstream of that creek's mouth at the Marchington River.

== See also ==
- List of rivers of Ontario
