= North River (Ontario) =

North River may refer to one of five rivers in Ontario, Canada:

- North River in Kenora District, in the Hudson Bay drainage basin, which flows into Marchington Lake on the Marchington River near the unincorporated place of Ghost River
- In Nipissing District:
  - North River, in the Ottawa River and Saint Lawrence River drainage basins, which flows to Radiant Lake on the Petawawa River, in Algonquin Provincial Park near the settlement of Radiant
  - North River (French: Rivière du Nord), also in the Ottawa River and Saint Lawrence River drainage basins, which flows to the Mattawa River just upstream of Lake Talon
- North River (Belmont Lake) in Peterborough County, in the Lake Ontario drainage basin, which flows into the North River Bay of Belmont Lake on the Crowe River
- North River in Simcoe County, in the Lake Huron drainage basin, which flows from Bass Lake west of the city of Orillia to the Coldwater River, just upstream of that river's mouth at Matchedash Bay on Severn Sound on Georgian Bay
- North River in Thunder Bay District, in the Lake Superior drainage basin, a tributary of the Whitefish River

== See also ==
- List of rivers of Ontario
