= Rosnel, Ontario =

Rosnel
- Location of Rosnel in Ontario
- Coordinates: 50°09′42″N 91°35′33″W
- Country: Canada
- Province: Ontario
- Region: Northwestern Ontario
- District: Kenora
- Part: Kenora, Unorganized
- Elevation: 371 m (1,217 ft)
- Time zone: UTC-6 (Central Time Zone)
  - Summer (DST): UTC-5 (Central Time Zone)
- Postal code FSA: P0T
- Area code: 807

Rosnel is a railway point and unincorporated place on the south side of Botsford Lake on the Marchington River in Unorganized Kenora District in northwestern Ontario, Canada.

It lies on the Canadian National Railway transcontinental main line, between Superior Junction to the west and McDougall Mills to the east, has a passing track, and is passed but not served by Via Rail transcontinental Canadian trains.
