= Stylurus intricatus =

Conservation status
- Least Concern (IUCN 3.1)

Scientific classification
- Kingdom: Animalia
- Phylum: Arthropoda
- Class: Insecta
- Order: Odonata
- Infraorder: Anisoptera
- Family: Gomphidae
- Genus: Stylurus
- Species: S. intricatus

Binomial name
- Stylurus intricatus (Hagen in Selys, 1858)

Synonyms
- Gomphus intricatus Hagen in Selys, 1858

Species of dragonfly

Stylurus intricatus, the brimstone clubtail, is a species of clubtail in the dragonfly family Gomphidae. It is found in North America.

The IUCN conservation status of Stylurus intricatus is "LC", least concern, with no immediate threat to the species' survival. The population is stable. The IUCN status was reviewed in 2017.
