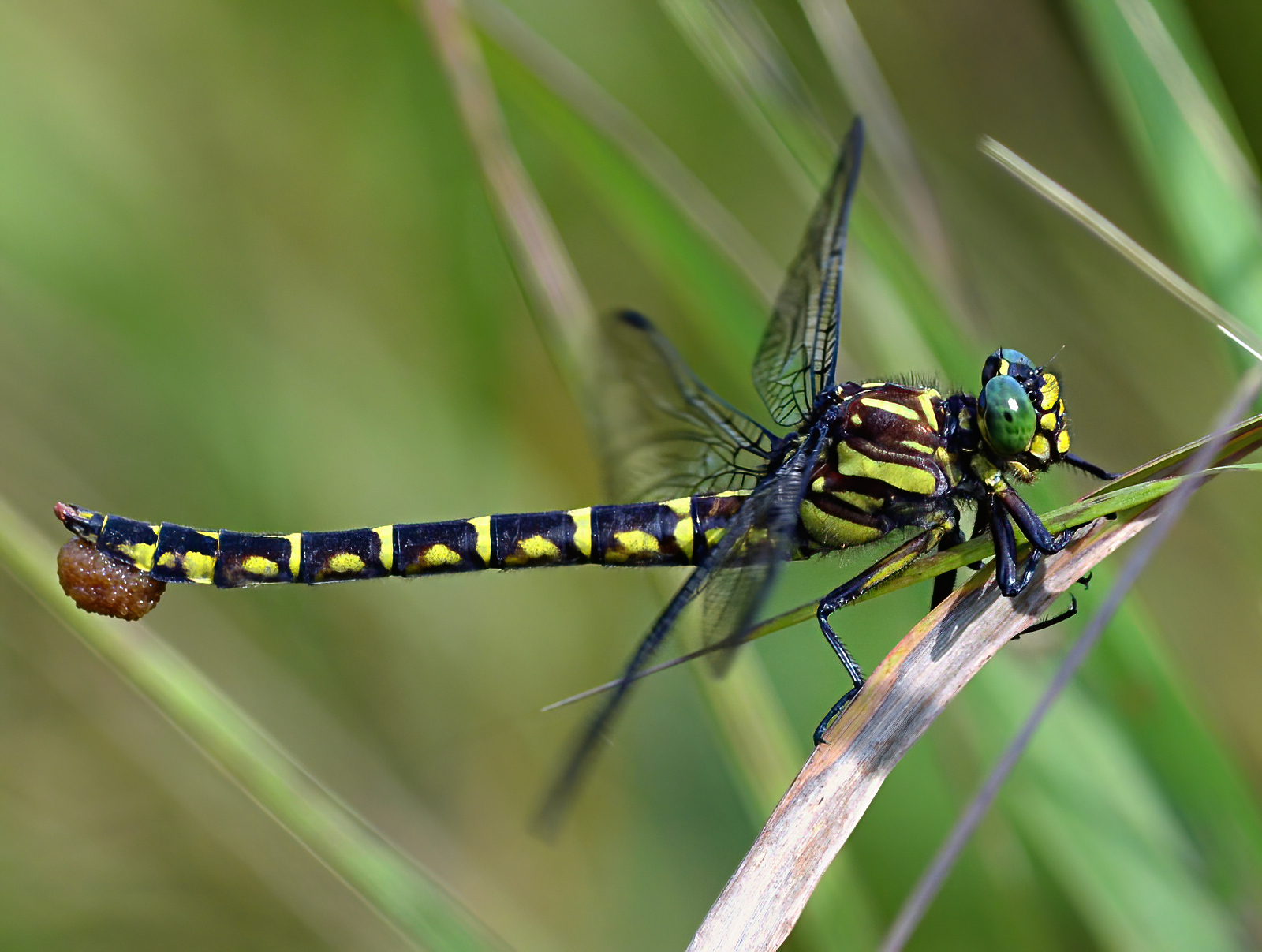

Conservation status
- Least Concern (IUCN 3.1)

Scientific classification
- Kingdom: Animalia
- Phylum: Arthropoda
- Class: Insecta
- Order: Odonata
- Infraorder: Anisoptera
- Family: Gomphidae
- Genus: Stylurus
- Species: S. scudderi

Binomial name
- Stylurus scudderi (Selys, 1873)

Synonyms
- Gomphus scudderi Selys, 1873

= Stylurus scudderi =

Species of dragonfly

Stylurus scudderi, the zebra clubtail, is a species of clubtail in the dragonfly family Gomphidae. It is found in North America.

The IUCN conservation status of Stylurus scudderi is "LC", least concern, with no immediate threat to the species' survival. The population is stable. The IUCN status was reviewed in 2017.
