= Ghost River, Kenora District =

Ghost River
- Dispersed Rural Community
- Location in Ontario
- Coordinates: 50°10′26″N 91°27′08″W
- Country: Canada
- Province: Ontario
- District: Kenora
- Part: Unorganized Kenora District
- Elevation: 378 m (1,240 ft)
- Time zone: UTC-6 (Central Time Zone)
  - Summer (DST): UTC-5 (Central Time Zone)
- Postal code FSA: P0V
- Area code: 807
- GNBC Code: FBHFD

Ghost River is an unincorporated place on the south side of Marchington Lake on the Marchington River in Unorganized Kenora District in northwestern Ontario, Canada.

It lies on the Canadian National Railway transcontinental main line, between McDougall Mills to the west and Robinson to the east, has a passing track, and is passed but not served by Via Rail transcontinental Canadian trains.
