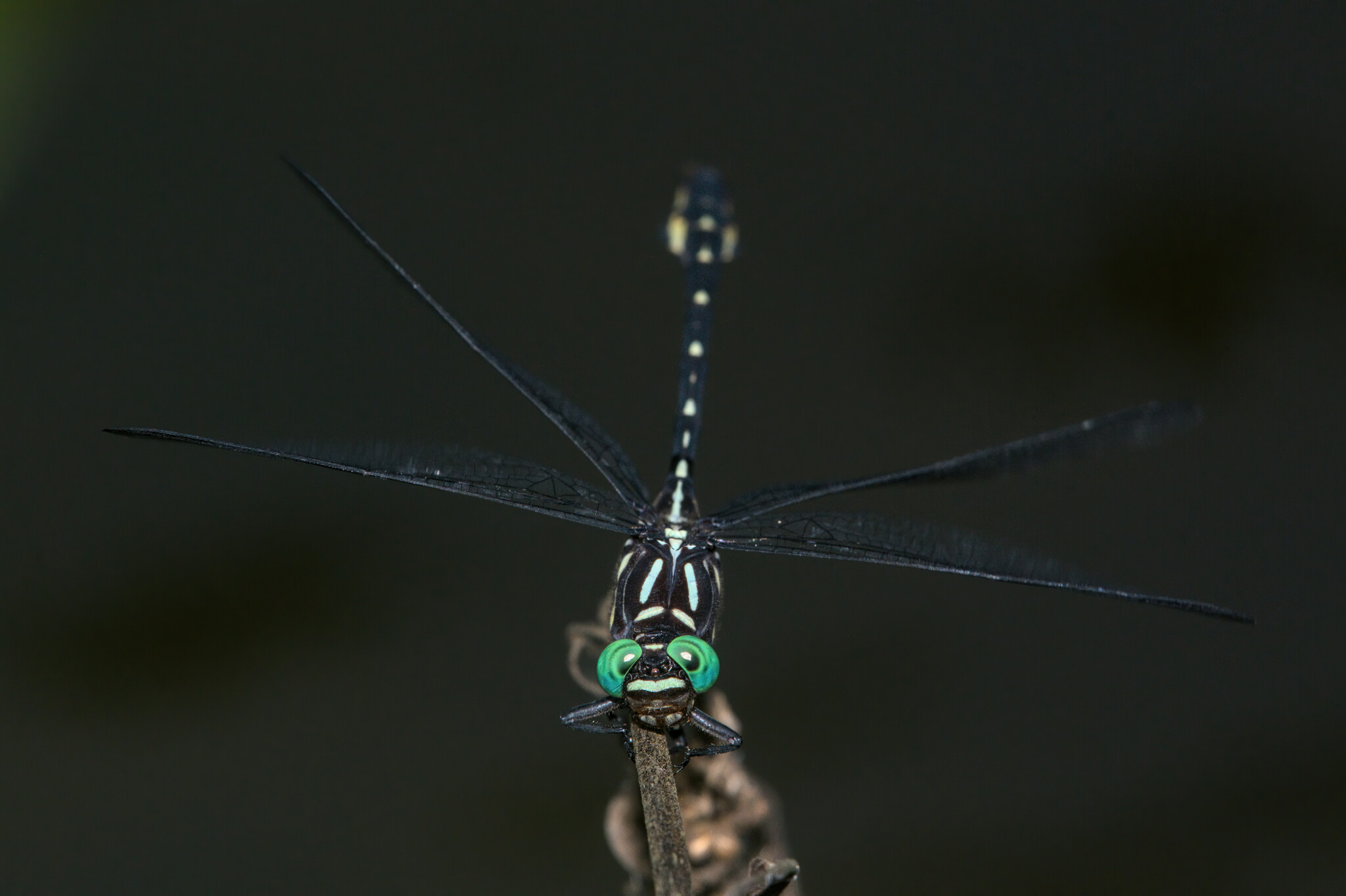

Conservation status
- Least Concern (IUCN 3.1)

Scientific classification
- Kingdom: Animalia
- Phylum: Arthropoda
- Clade: Pancrustacea
- Class: Insecta
- Order: Odonata
- Infraorder: Anisoptera
- Family: Gomphidae
- Genus: Stylurus
- Species: S. spiniceps

Binomial name
- Stylurus spiniceps (Walsh, 1862)

= Stylurus spiniceps =

Species of dragonfly

Stylurus spiniceps, the arrow clubtail, is a species of clubtail in the dragonfly family Gomphidae. It is found in North America.

The IUCN conservation status of Stylurus spiniceps is "LC", least concern, with no immediate threat to the species' survival. The population is stable. The IUCN status was reviewed in 2017.

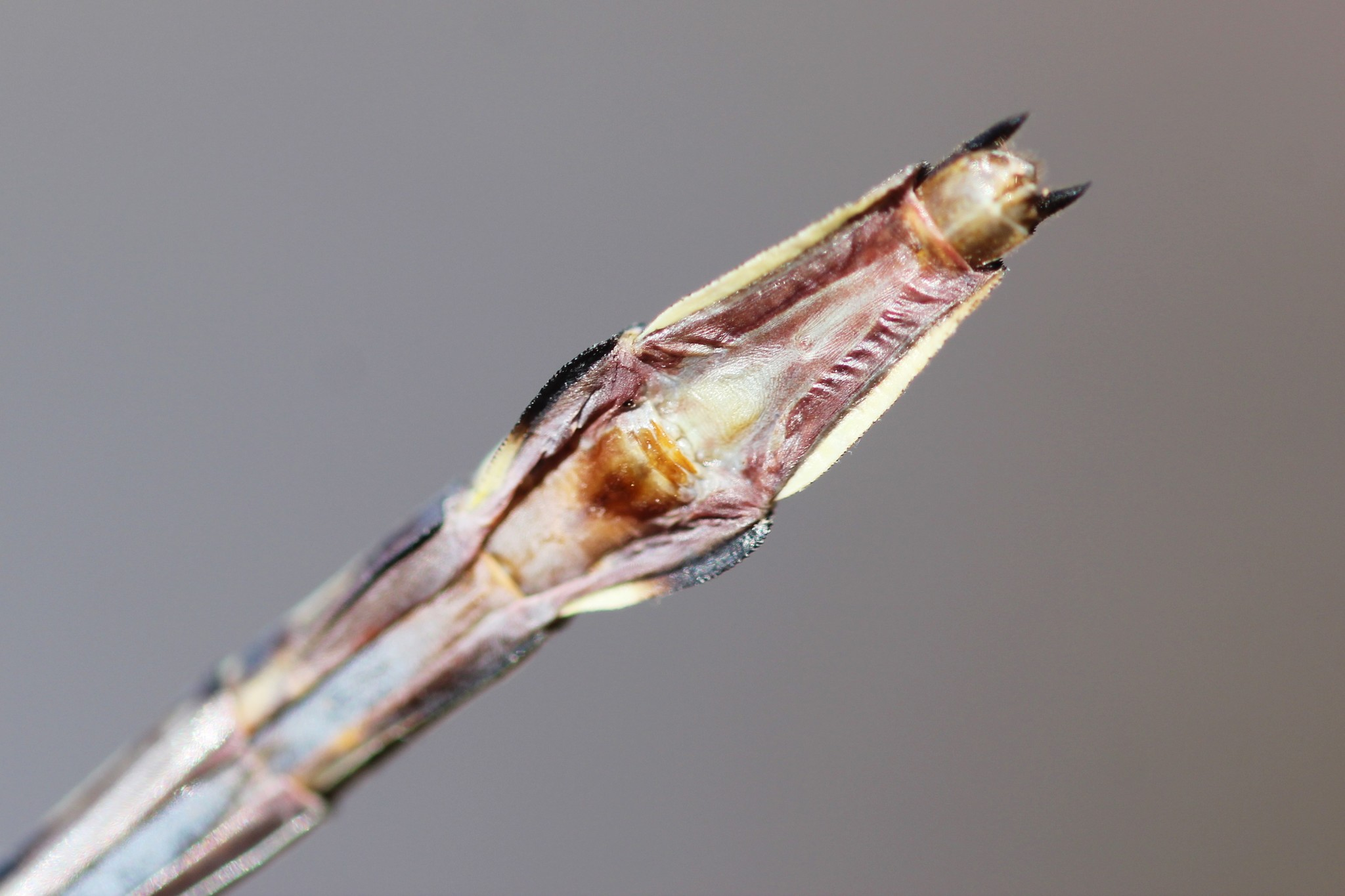
Specimen of the Arrow Clubtail (Stylurus spiniceps)
