= Lac Seul =

Reservoir in Kenora District, Ontario

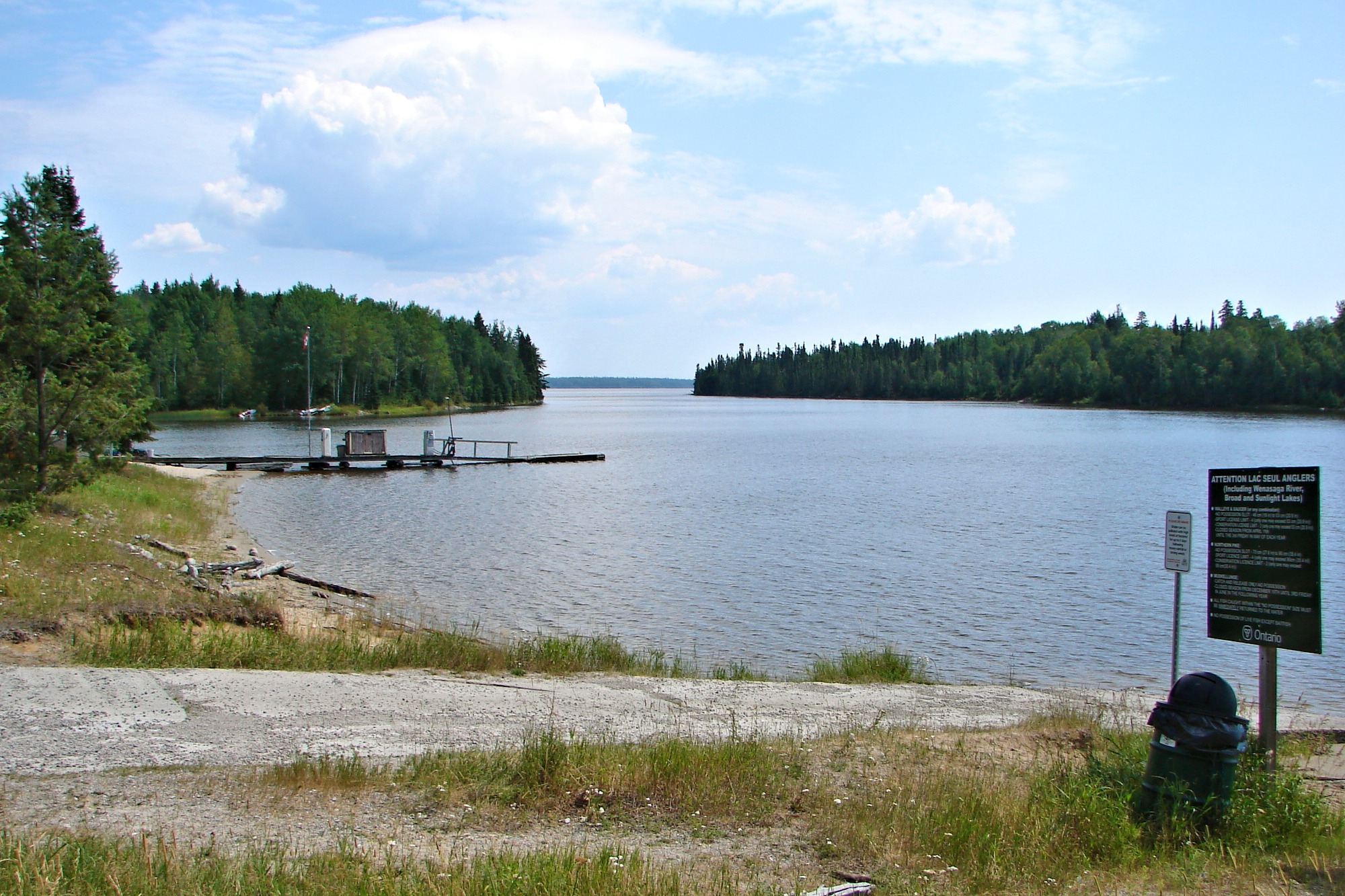
- Boat launch on Lac Seul at Ear Falls

- Location within Ontario
- Location: Kenora District, Ontario
- Coordinates: 50°20′N 92°30′W
- Primary inflows: Vermilion River
- Primary outflows: English River
- Basin countries: Canada
- Surface area: 1,657 km^{2} (640 sq mi)
- Max. depth: 47.2 m (155 ft)
- Surface elevation: 357 m (1,171 ft)

Lac Seul is a large, crescent-shaped reservoir in Kenora District, northwestern Ontario, Canada. It is approximately 241 km (150 mi) long. It has a maximum (regulated) depth of 47.2 m, with a surface elevation of 357 m above sea level. Its level is raised in the summer and then drawn down in the winter months to reach points of as low as 4.9 m below the maximum level. It is the second largest body of water entirely within the province of Ontario (Lake Nipigon being first).

The lake consists of open-water bays, narrow channels, and islands. It is a relatively shallow lake with many rock shoals. This provides a good habitat for walleye (also known as "yellow pickerel") and northern pike as well as yellow perch. During the Lac Seul project of 1968-1972 no muskelunge were noted in the catches of research nets set over those years. Significant numbers of whitefish, tullibee, burbot, walleye, northern pike, perch, fighting muskies, and cisco were noted as well, although they infrequently were noted in the sport fishery. Lac Seul is noted for offering some of the best fishing in Ontario.

Lac Seul is located on the former lakebed of Glacial Lake Agassiz. Owing to this previous lake, much of the bottom of Lac Seul is covered with thick deposits of lacustrine silts and varved clay of varying thickness. The water of Lac Seul is tea-coloured. In clear water Walleye only feed at dusk and dawn because of their light-sensitive eyes, but because of the tea colour of Lac Seul, it provides excellent Walleye and Northern Pike angling opportunities throughout the day.

Lac Seul supports population of Northern Pike, Walleye, and other fish species, and is designated by the province as one of Ontario's "Specially Designated Waters" within Fisheries Management Zone 4.

The numerous islands on Lac Seul are considered regionally significant calving habitat for the rare boreal woodland caribou.

The natural capacity of Lac Seul is augmented by the diversion of water from the Albany River drainage basin at Lake St. Joseph, allowing hydroelectric stations at Ear Falls where the English River leaves the lake, and Manitou Falls, 30 km downstream, to generate 90600 kW of electricity.

== History ==
In fur trade days, it was part of a canoe route west from James Bay: James Bay, Albany River, Lake St. Joseph, portage, Lac Seul, English River (Ontario), Winnipeg River, Lake Winnipeg.

Lac Seul, once a significant water transportation route, played a crucial role during the Red Lake Gold Rush, which began in late 1925 following the discovery of substantial gold deposits. The community of Hudson, Ontario, served as a key transportation hub due to its position along the railway line. From Hudson, supplies were transported via steamboats, scows, and tugboats across Lac Seul toward Red Lake, supporting the burgeoning mining industry in the region.

== Nearby communities ==
- Ear Falls, Ontario
- Goldpines, Ontario
- Lac Seul First Nation - Lac Seul 28 Indian Reserve
- Lac Seul Post, Ontario
- Sioux Lookout, Ontario
- Wabauskang First Nation - Wabauskang 21 Indian Reserve
- Hudson, Kenora District, Ontario

== Tributaries ==
- Vermilion River

== See also ==
- List of lakes in Ontario
