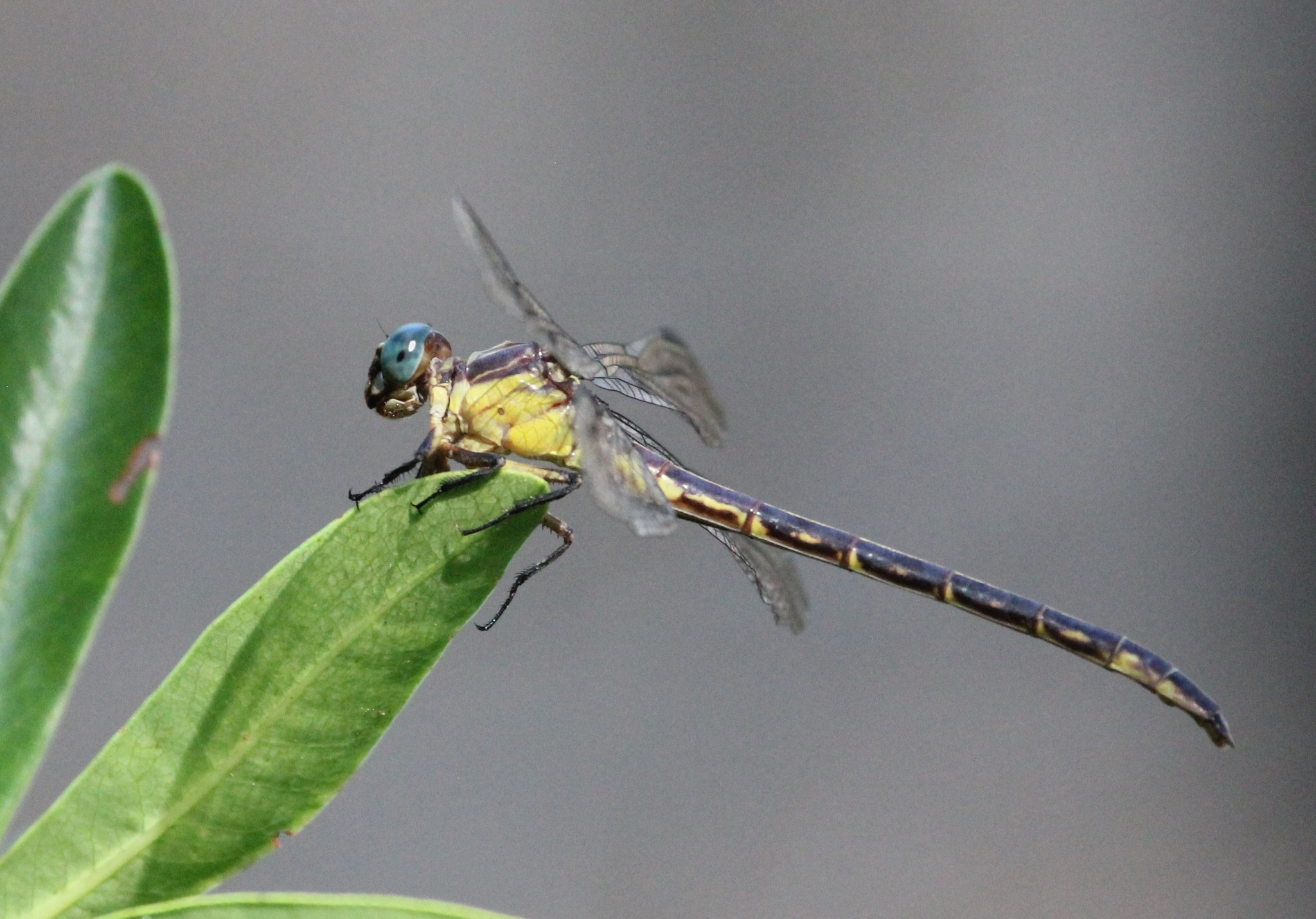

Conservation status
- Vulnerable (IUCN 3.1)

Scientific classification
- Kingdom: Animalia
- Phylum: Arthropoda
- Class: Insecta
- Order: Odonata
- Infraorder: Anisoptera
- Family: Gomphidae
- Genus: Stylurus
- Species: S. potulentus

Binomial name
- Stylurus potulentus (Needham, 1942)

= Stylurus potulentus =

Species of dragonfly

Stylurus potulentus, the yellow-sided clubtail, is a species of dragonfly in the family Gomphidae. It is endemic to the United States. Its natural habitat is rivers. It is threatened by habitat loss.
