= Kashaweogama Lake =

Lake in Thunder Bay District, Ontario, Canada

- Location within Ontario
- Location: Thunder Bay District, Ontario
- Coordinates: 50°25′N 90°46′W
- Primary inflows: Wiggle Creek, Hough Creek
- Primary outflows: Marchington River
- Basin countries: Canada
- Max. length: 18.4 km (11.4 mi)
- Max. width: 1.3 km (0.8 mi)
- Surface elevation: 390 m (1,280 ft)

Kashaweogama Lake is a lake located in Thunder Bay District in northwestern Ontario, Canada. It is the head of the Marchington River. Highway 599 passes at the eastern tip of the lake.
