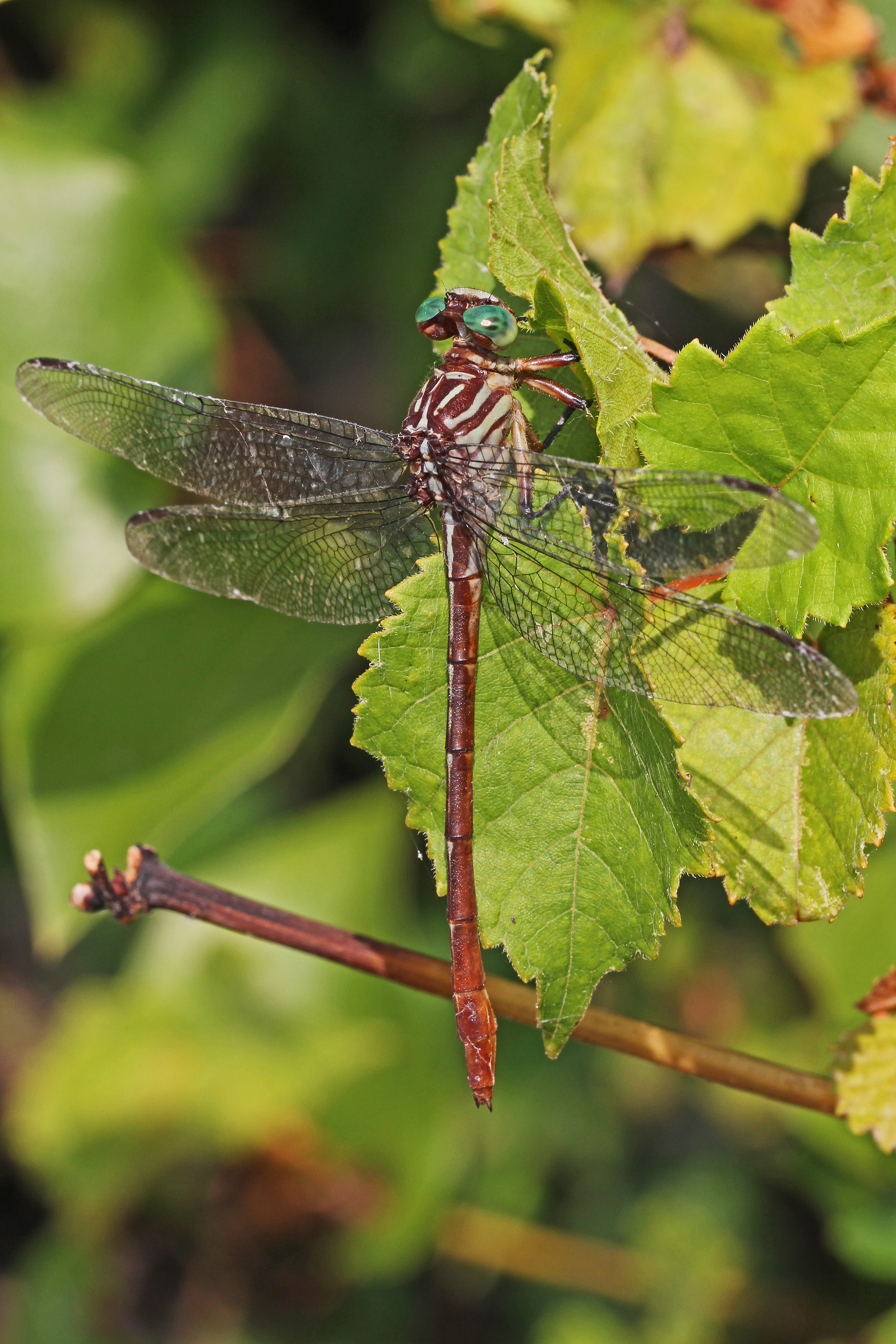

Conservation status
- Least Concern (IUCN 3.1)

Scientific classification
- Kingdom: Animalia
- Phylum: Arthropoda
- Class: Insecta
- Order: Odonata
- Infraorder: Anisoptera
- Family: Gomphidae
- Genus: Stylurus
- Species: S. plagiatus

Binomial name
- Stylurus plagiatus (Selys, 1854)

Synonyms
- Gomphus plagiatus Selys, 1854

= Stylurus plagiatus =

Species of dragonfly

Stylurus plagiatus, the russet-tipped clubtail, is a species of clubtail in the dragonfly family Gomphidae. It is found in Central America and North America.

The IUCN conservation status of Stylurus plagiatus is "LC", least concern, with no immediate threat to the species' survival. The population is stable. The IUCN status was reviewed in 2017.

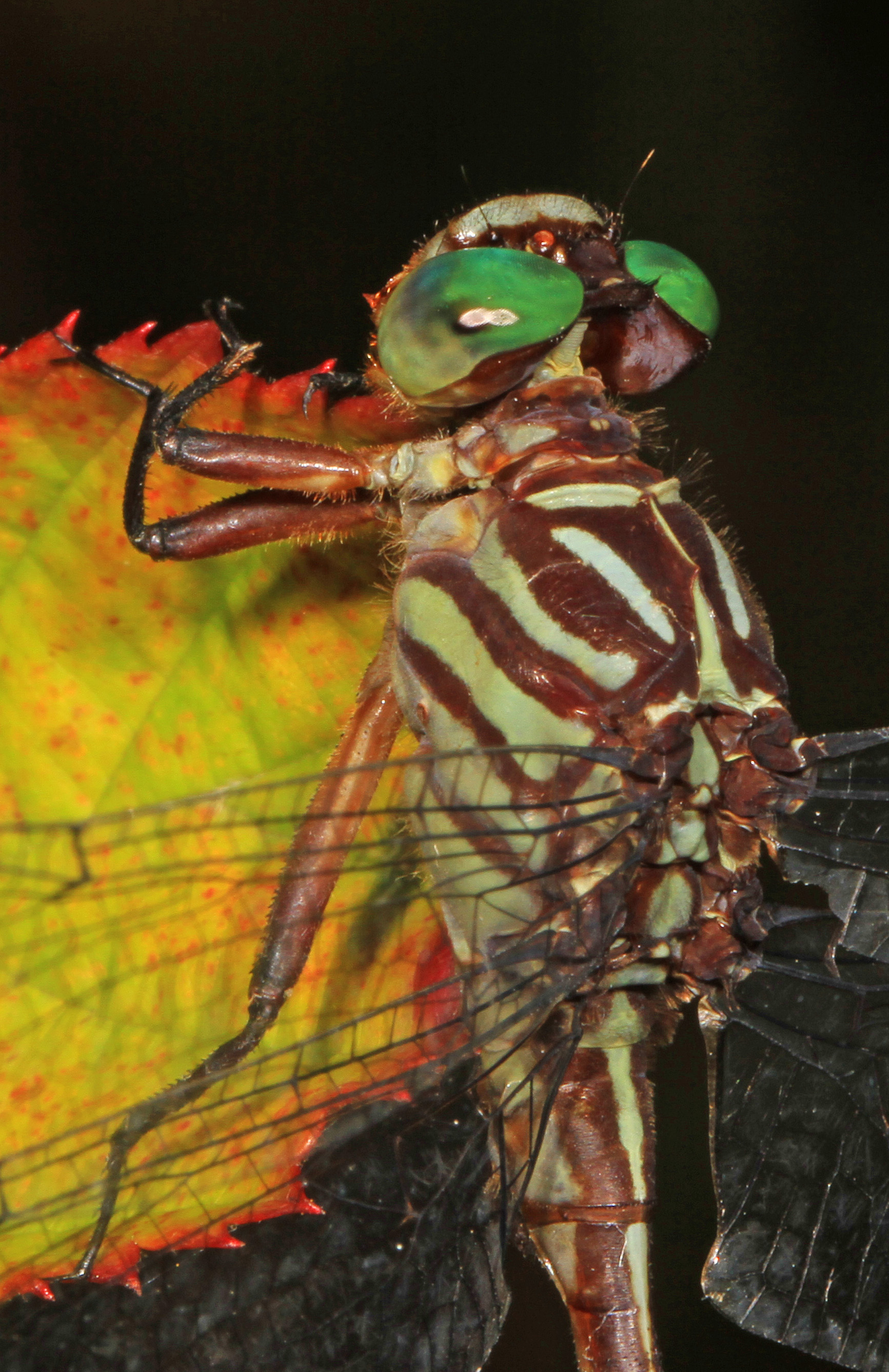
Russet-tipped clubtail, Stylurus plagiatus

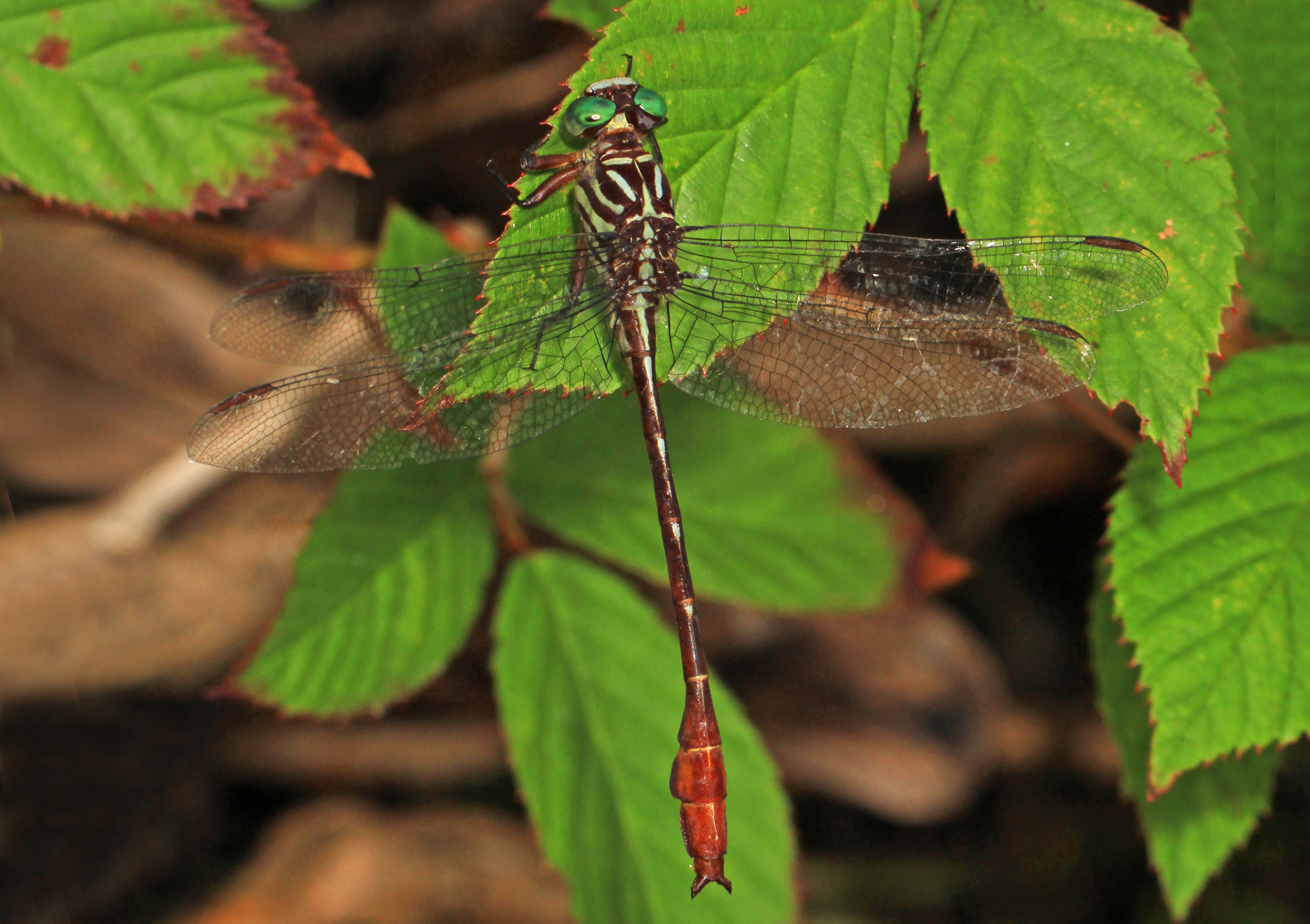
Russet-tipped clubtail, Stylurus plagiatus
