= English River, Ontario =

English River
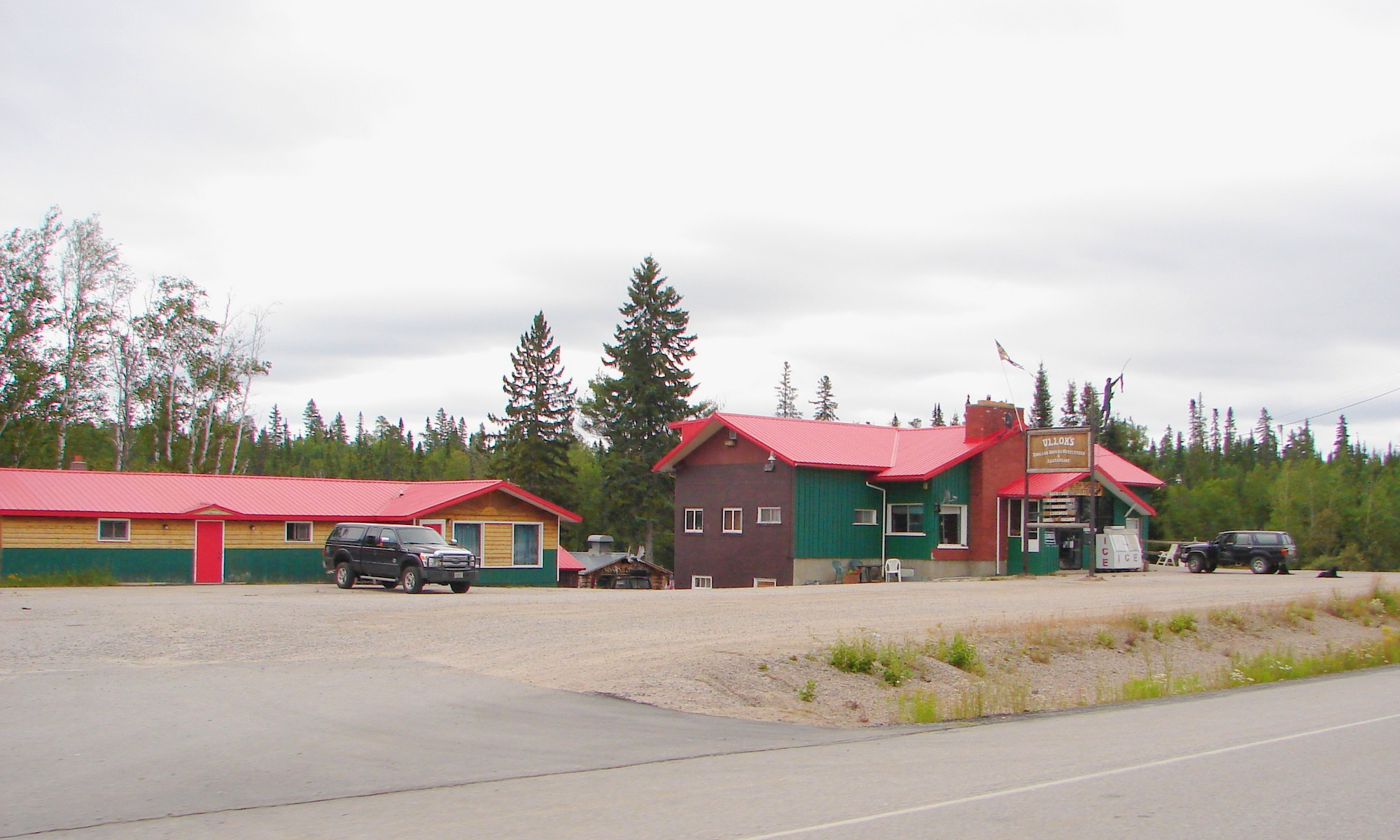

- Location of English River in Ontario
- Coordinates: 49°13′36″N 90°57′56″W
- Country: Canada
- Province: Ontario
- Region: Northwestern Ontario
- District: Kenora
- Elevation: 463 m (1,519 ft)
- Time zone: UTC-6 (Central)
  - Summer (DST): UTC-5 (Central)
- Area code: 807

English River is an unincorporated place on the border of geographic Corman Township, Kenora District and the Unorganized Part of Thunder Bay District in Northwestern Ontario, Canada. It was a Hudson's Bay Company trading post between 1894 and 1911, and is located where Ontario Highway 17 crosses the English River at its confluence with the Scotch River.

English River is also the name of a nearby railway point, 2 kilometres (1.2 mi) to the southwest and wholly within Corman Township, Kenora District (49°10′27″N 90°51′41″W), constructed as part of the Canadian Pacific Railway transcontinental main line. In 1890 English River station was located at mile 115.4 from Port Arthur.
