= Pelican Lake (Kenora District, Ontario) =

Lake in Kenora District, Ontario, Canada

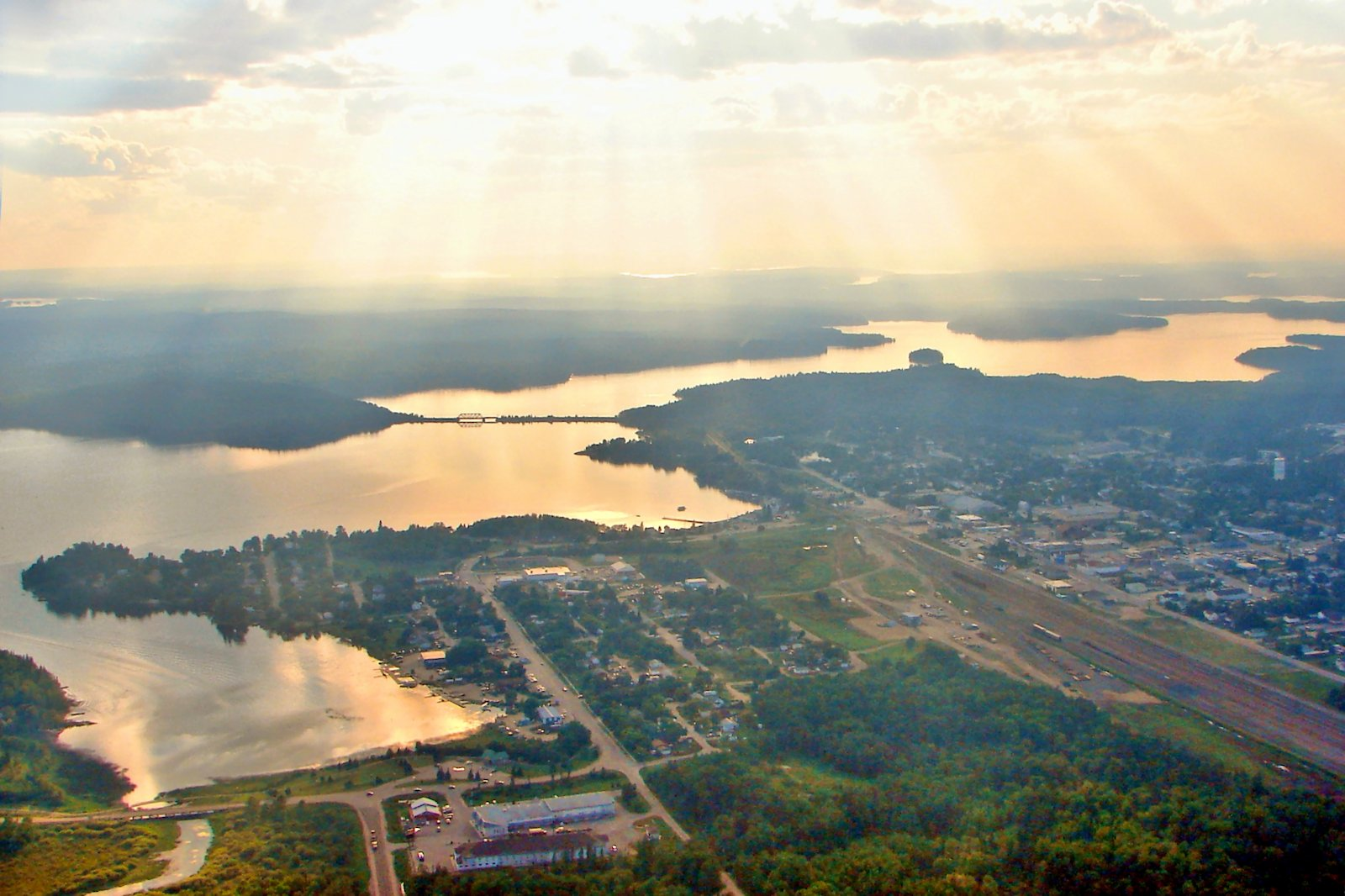
- Pelican Lake with Sioux Lookout in the foreground

- Location of Pelican Lake in Ontario
- Location: Kenora District, Ontario
- Coordinates: 50°06′41″N 91°57′40″W
- Primary inflows: English River
- Primary outflows: English River
- Basin countries: Canada
- Max. length: 8.5 km (5.3 mi)
- Max. width: 6.3 km (3.9 mi)
- Surface elevation: 357 m (1,171 ft)
- Settlements: Sioux Lookout, Pelican

Pelican Lake is a lake in the Hudson Bay drainage basin in the town of Sioux Lookout and in Unorganized Kenora District in Kenora District, northwestern Ontario, Canada. It is about 8.5 kilometres (5.3 mi) long and 6.3 kilometres (3.9 mi) wide and lies at an elevation of 356 metres (1,168 ft). The town centre of Sioux Lookout is on the east shore of the lake, the railway point Pelican on the southwest, and the Canadian National Railway transcontinental main line (a line used by Via Rail's transcontinental Canadian trains) crosses the lake and runs along the west shore.

The primary inflow is the English River which comes over the Frog Rapids from Abram Lake at Frog Rapids Narrows at the south end of the lake. Another significant inflow is an unnamed river at the northwest of the lake, arriving from Botham Bay on Big Vermillion Lake. The primary outflow is the English River over the Pelican Falls to Lost Lake (Ontario) at the northwest corner of the lake, which flows via the Winnipeg River and the Nelson River to Hudson Bay.

== See also ==
- List of lakes in Ontario
