= Sturgeon Lake (Northwestern Ontario) =

Lake in Thunder Bay District, Ontario, Canada

- Location within Ontario
- Location: Kenora and Thunder Bay Districts, Ontario
- Coordinates: 49°58′28″N 90°46′08″W
- Primary outflows: Sturgeon River
- Basin countries: Canada
- Max. length: 59 km (37 mi)
- Max. width: 7.5 km (4.7 mi)
- Surface area: 300 km^{2} (116 sq mi)
- Shore length^{1}: 284 km (176.5 mi)
- ^{1} Shore length is not a well-defined measure.

Sturgeon Lake is a lake in the Kenora and Thunder Bay districts in northwestern Ontario, Canada. The lake has many bays and arms, and is drained by the Sturgeon River. It has a shallow V shape, with one arm beginning near O'Briens Landing and extending 35 km (22 mi) north-east to Sturgeon Lake Narrows at the vertex of the "V", and the second arm continuing from there another 24 km (15 mi) north to a point 6.5 km (4.0 mi)south of Savant Lake. Savant Lake (Sturgeon Lake) Water Aerodrome is located on the lake.

== See also ==
- List of lakes in Ontario
