= Drive Creek (Ontario) =

Drive Creek ruisseau Drive
- Location of the mouth of Drive Creek in Ontario

Location
- Country: Canada
- Province: Ontario
- Region: Northwestern Ontario
- District: Kenora

Physical characteristics
- Source: Drive Lake
  - coordinates: 50°20′10″N 91°10′15″W
  - elevation: 393 m (1,289 ft)
- Mouth: Marchington River
  - coordinates: 50°21′00″N 91°08′37″W
  - elevation: 390 m (1,280 ft)
- Length: 2.9 km (1.8 mi)

Basin features
- River system: Nelson River drainage basin
- Tributaries
  - right: Tripoli Creek

Drive Creek (French: ruisseau Drive) is a creek in the Nelson River drainage basin in Kenora District, northwestern Ontario, Canada. It begins at Drive Lake at an elevation of 396 metres (1,299 ft). The creek then takes in its right tributary Tripoli Creek at an elevation of 390 metres (1,280 ft) just upstream of its mouth at the Marchington River at the same elevation. The total length of the creek is 2.9 kilometres (1.8 mi).

== Tributaries ==
- Tripoli Creek

== See also ==
- List of rivers of Ontario
