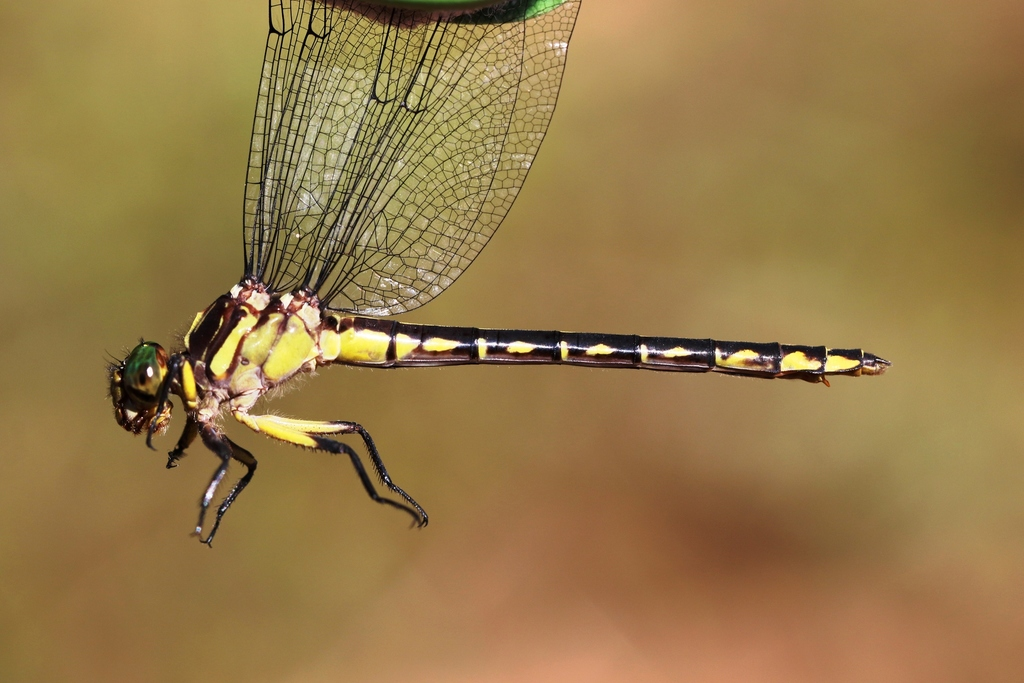
- female

Conservation status
- Least Concern (IUCN 3.1)

Scientific classification
- Kingdom: Animalia
- Phylum: Arthropoda
- Class: Insecta
- Order: Odonata
- Infraorder: Anisoptera
- Family: Gomphidae
- Genus: Stylurus
- Species: S. amnicola

Binomial name
- Stylurus amnicola (Walsh, 1862)

Synonyms
- Gomphus amnicola Walsh, 1862

= Stylurus amnicola =

Species of dragonfly

Stylurus amnicola, the riverine clubtail, is a species of clubtail in the family of dragonflies known as Gomphidae. It is found in North America.

The IUCN conservation status of Stylurus amnicola is "LC", least concern, with no immediate threat to the species' survival. The population is stable.

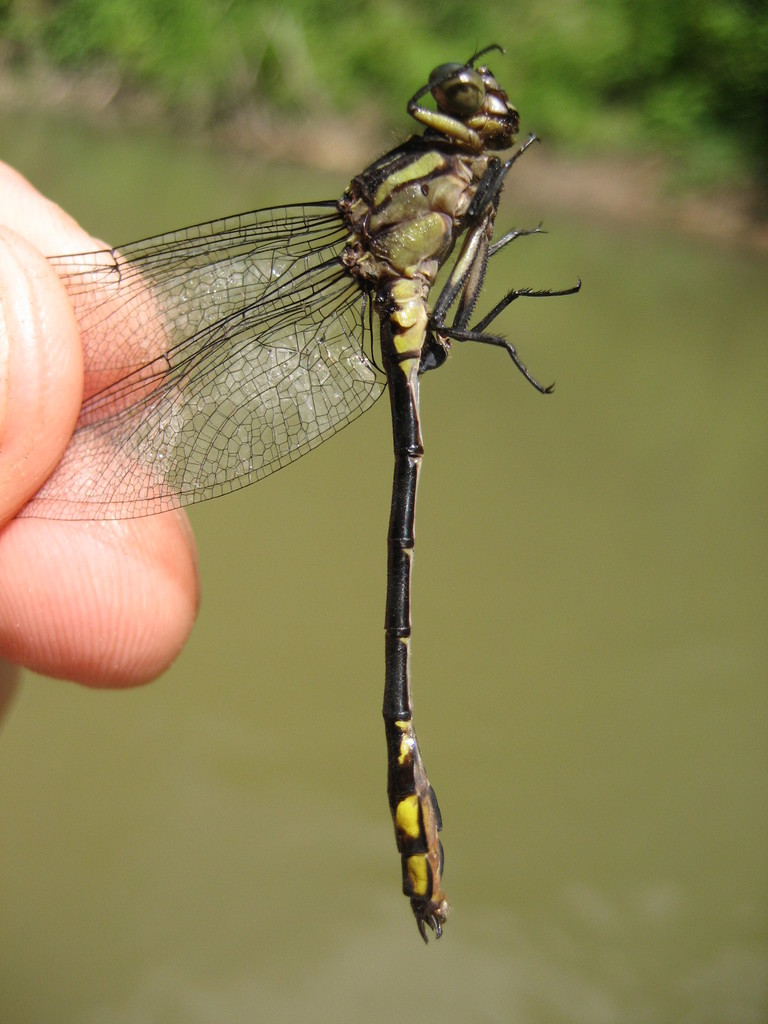
male
