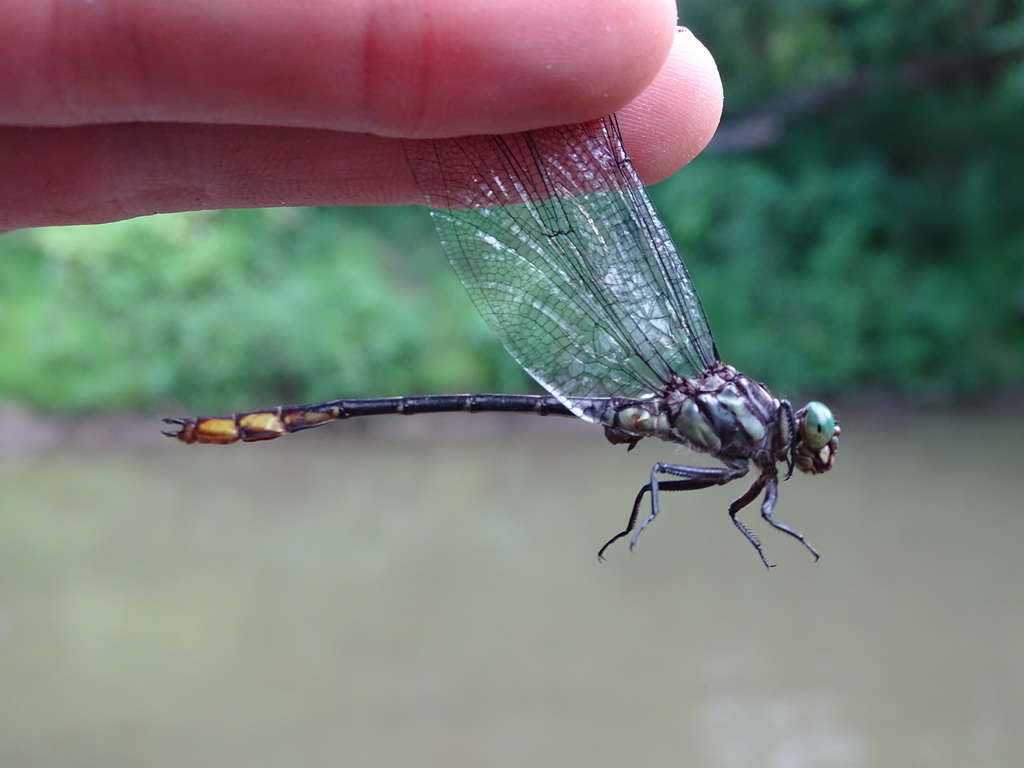

Conservation status
- Least Concern (IUCN 3.1)

Scientific classification
- Domain: Eukaryota
- Kingdom: Animalia
- Phylum: Arthropoda
- Class: Insecta
- Order: Odonata
- Infraorder: Anisoptera
- Family: Gomphidae
- Genus: Stylurus
- Species: S. laurae

Binomial name
- Stylurus laurae Williamson, 1932

= Stylurus laurae =

Species of dragonfly

Stylurus laurae, or Laura's clubtail, is a species of clubtail in the family of dragonflies known as Gomphidae. It is found in North America.

The IUCN conservation status of Stylurus laurae is "LC", least concern, with no immediate threat to the species' survival. The population is stable.
