= Stylurus ivae =

Conservation status
- Least Concern (IUCN 3.1)

Scientific classification
- Kingdom: Animalia
- Phylum: Arthropoda
- Class: Insecta
- Order: Odonata
- Infraorder: Anisoptera
- Family: Gomphidae
- Genus: Stylurus
- Species: S. ivae

Binomial name
- Stylurus ivae Williamson, 1932

Species of dragonfly

Stylurus ivae, the shining clubtail, is a species of clubtail in the dragonfly family Gomphidae. It is found in North America.

The IUCN conservation status of Stylurus ivae is "LC", least concern, with no immediate threat to the species' survival. The population is stable. The IUCN status was reviewed in 2017.
