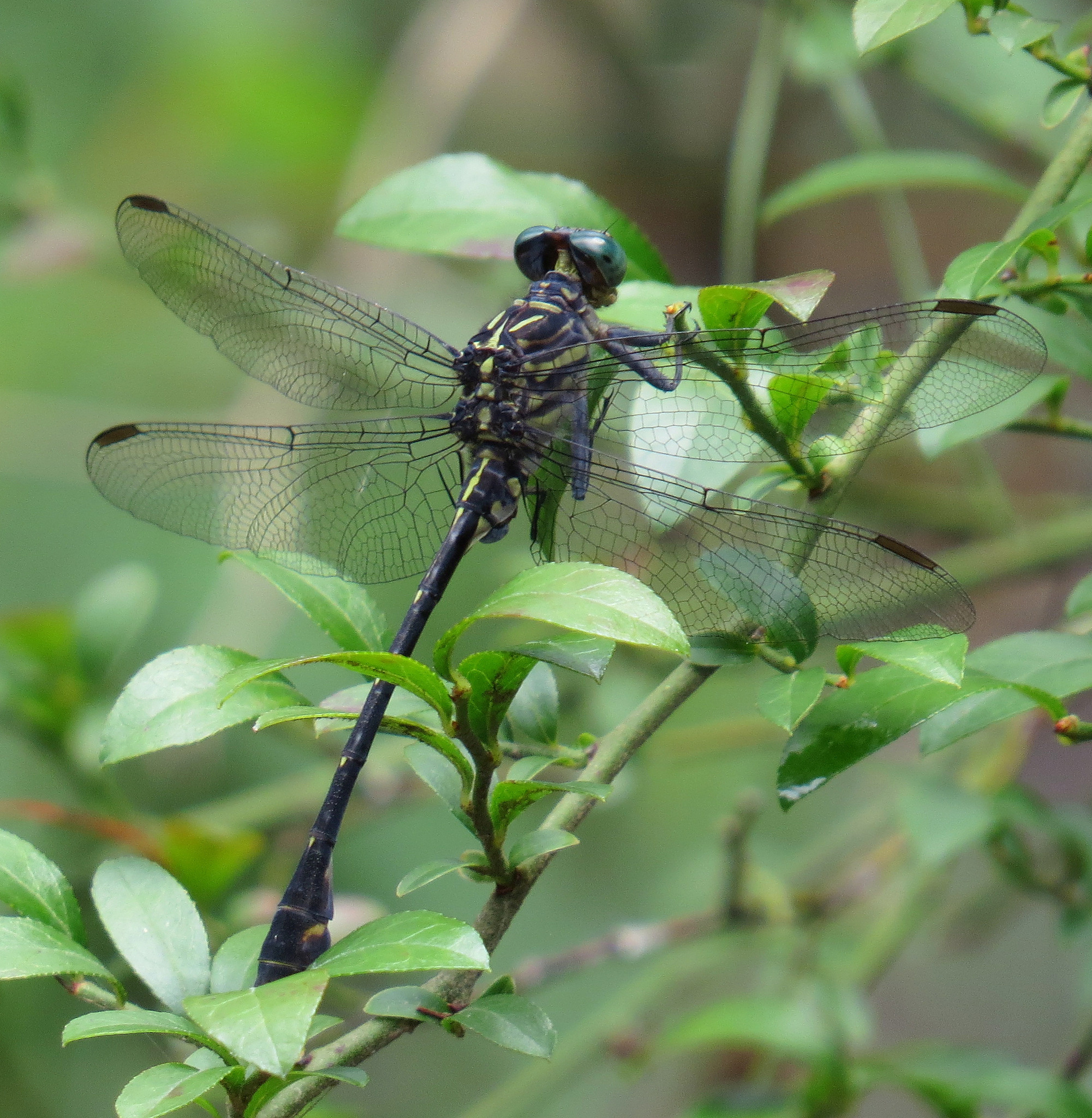

Conservation status
- Least Concern (IUCN 3.1)

Scientific classification
- Kingdom: Animalia
- Phylum: Arthropoda
- Class: Insecta
- Order: Odonata
- Infraorder: Anisoptera
- Family: Gomphidae
- Genus: Stylurus
- Species: S. townesi

Binomial name
- Stylurus townesi Gloyd, 1936

= Stylurus townesi =

Species of dragonfly

Stylurus townesi, the Townes's clubtail, is a species of dragonfly in the family Gomphidae. It is endemic in the United States. Its natural habitat is rivers.
