= Vermilion River (Lac Seul) =

- Location of the mouth of the Vermilion River in Ontario

Location
- Country: Canada
- Province: Ontario
- Region: Northwestern Ontario
- District: Kenora

Physical characteristics
- Source: Highstone Lake
  - coordinates: 50°23′38″N 91°32′27″W
  - elevation: 366 m (1,201 ft)
- Mouth: Lac Seul
  - coordinates: 50°25′05″N 91°50′11″W
  - elevation: 357 m (1,171 ft)
- Length: 30 km (19 mi)

Basin features
- River system: Hudson Bay drainage basin

The Vermilion River is a river in the Hudson Bay drainage basin in Kenora District in Northwestern Ontario, Canada. The river begins at Highstone Lake and reaches its mouth at Brechin Bay on Lac Seul, about 35 kilometres (22 mi) north of the town of Sioux Lookout, which flows via the English River, Winnipeg River and Nelson River to Hudson Bay.

== Tributaries ==
- Tully Creek (right)
- Bump Creek (left)
- Sigurd Creek (right)
- Per Creek (left)

== See also ==
- List of rivers of Ontario
