= Tripoli Lake (Kenora District) =

Lake in Ontario, Canada

- Location within Ontario
- Location: Kenora District, Ontario
- Coordinates: 50°20′34″N 91°04′43″W
- Primary outflows: Tripoli Creek
- Basin countries: Canada
- Max. length: 1.3 km (0.81 mi)
- Max. width: 0.44 km (0.27 mi)
- Surface elevation: 396 m (1,299 ft)

Tripoli Lake is a lake in the Nelson River drainage basin in Kenora District, northwestern Ontario, Canada and the source of Tripoli Creek. It is about 1,300 metres (4,265 ft) long and 440 metres (1,444 ft) wide and lies at an elevation of 396 metres (1,299 ft). The lake is 2 kilometres (1.2 mi) north of Highway 516.

== See also ==
- List of lakes in Ontario
