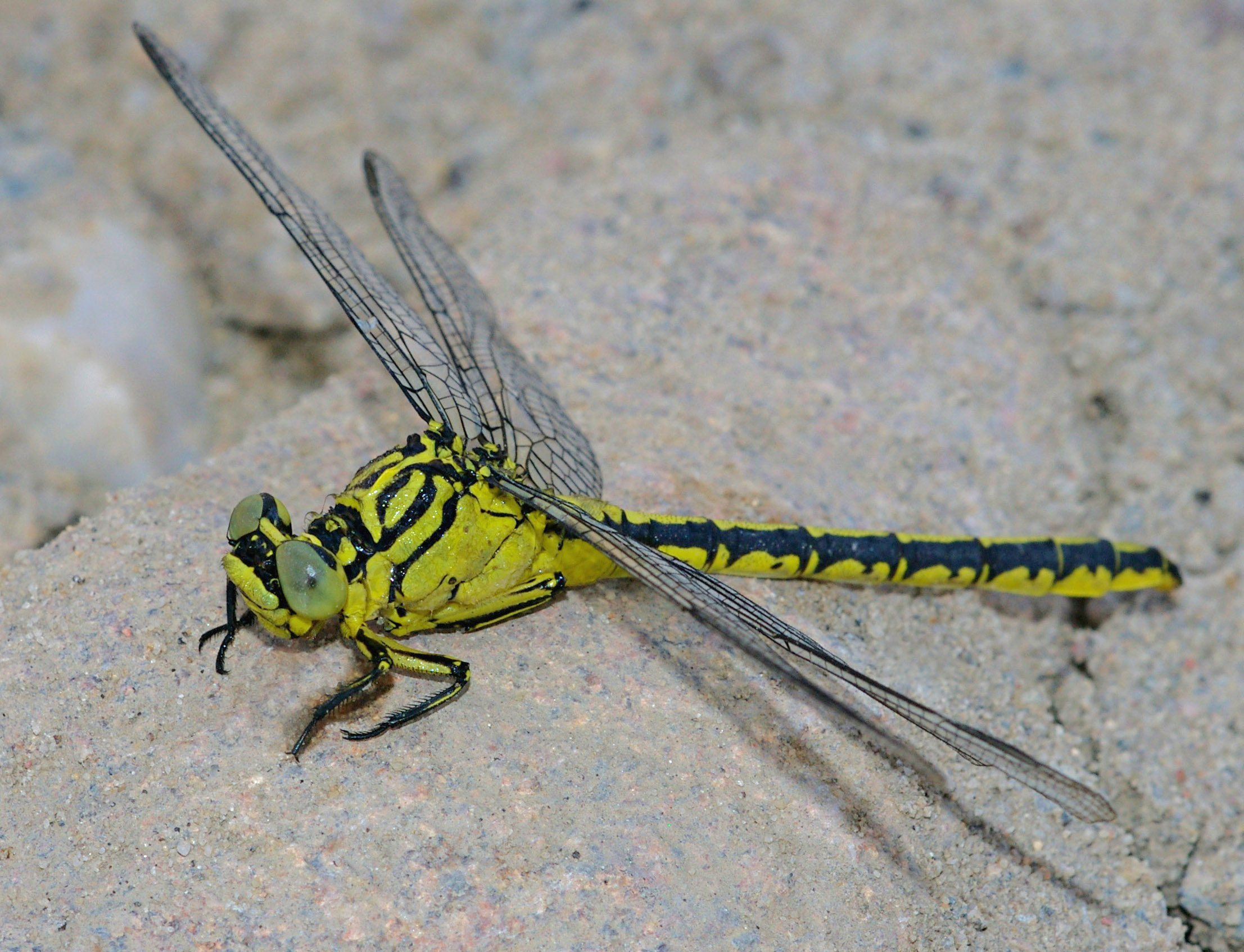
- Female Stylurus flavipes

Scientific classification
- Kingdom: Animalia
- Phylum: Arthropoda
- Class: Insecta
- Order: Odonata
- Infraorder: Anisoptera
- Family: Gomphidae
- Genus: Stylurus; Needham, 1897

= Stylurus =

Genus of dragonflies

Stylurus is a genus of dragonflies in the family Gomphidae. They are commonly known as hanging clubtails from their habit of hanging nearly vertically when they perch.

The genus contains the following species:

- Stylurus amicus (Needham, 1930)
- Stylurus amnicola (Walsh, 1862) - Riverine Clubtail
- Stylurus annulatus (Djakonov, 1926)
- Stylurus clathratus (Needham, 1930)
- Stylurus endicotti (Needham, 1930)
- Stylurus erectocornus Liu & Chao in Chao, 1990
- Stylurus falcatus Gloyd, 1944
- Stylurus flavicornis (Needham, 1931)
- Stylurus flavipes (Charpentier, 1825) - River Clubtail
- Stylurus gaudens (Chao, 1953)
- Stylurus gideon (Needham, 1941)
- Stylurus intricatus (Selys, 1858) - Brimstone Clubtail
- Stylurus ivae Williamson, 1932 - Shining Clubtail
- Stylurus kreyenbergi (Ris, 1928)
- Stylurus laurae Williamson, 1932 - Laura's Clubtail
- Stylurus nagoyanus Asahina, 1951
- Stylurus nanningensis Liu, 1985
- Stylurus nobilis Liu & Chao in Chao, 1990
- Stylurus notatus (Rambur, 1842) - Elusive Clubtail
- Stylurus occultus (Selys, 1878)
- Stylurus oculatus (Asahina, 1949)
- Stylurus olivaceus (Selys, 1873) - Olive Clubtail
- Stylurus placidus Liu & Chao in Chao, 1990
- Stylurus plagiatus (Selys, 1854) - Russet-tipped Clubtail
- Stylurus potulentus (Needham, 1942) - Yellow-sided Clubtail
- Stylurus scudderi (Selys, 1873) - Zebra Clubtail
- Stylurus spiniceps (Walsh, 1862) - Arrow Clubtail
- Stylurus takashii (Asahina, 1966)
- Stylurus tongrensis Liu, 1991
- Stylurus townesi Gloyd, 1936 - Towne's Clubtail
