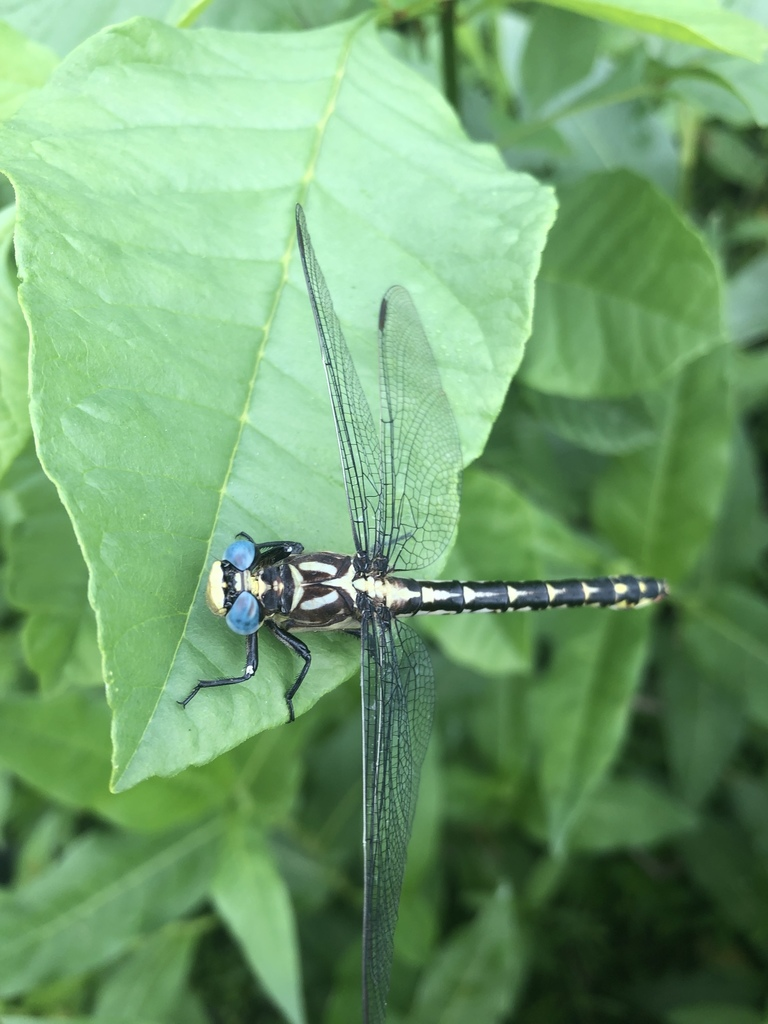

Conservation status
- Least Concern (IUCN 3.1)

Scientific classification
- Kingdom: Animalia
- Phylum: Arthropoda
- Class: Insecta
- Order: Odonata
- Infraorder: Anisoptera
- Family: Gomphidae
- Genus: Stylurus
- Species: S. olivaceus

Binomial name
- Stylurus olivaceus (Selys, 1873)

Synonyms
- Gomphus olivaceus Selys, 1873

= Stylurus olivaceus =

Species of dragonfly

Stylurus olivaceus, the olive clubtail, is a species of clubtail in the dragonfly family Gomphidae. It is found in North America.

The IUCN conservation status of Stylurus olivaceus is "LC", least concern, with no immediate threat to the species' survival. The population is stable. The IUCN status was reviewed in 2017.
