= Sturgeon River (Marchington River tributary) =

Coordinates: 50°07′00″N 91°04′39″W

Location
- Country: Canada
- Province: Ontario

Physical characteristics
- Source
  - location: Sturgeon Lake
- Mouth
  - location: Marchington Lake
  - elevation: 362 m (1,188 ft)
- Length: 38.5 km (23.9 mi)

The Sturgeon River is a river in the Hudson Bay drainage basin located in Kenora and Thunder Bay Districts in northwestern Ontario, Canada. It travels 38.5 kilometres (23.9 mi) west from its head at Sturgeon Lake, Thunder Bay District, through several intermediate lakes, to the Marchington River at Marchington Lake, Kenora District.

The CN transcontinental rail line crosses the river at its mouth near Robinson, and Highway 599 crosses at the eastern end near its head.

== Tributaries ==
- Barnard Creek
- Lake of Bays River

== See also ==
- List of rivers of Ontario
