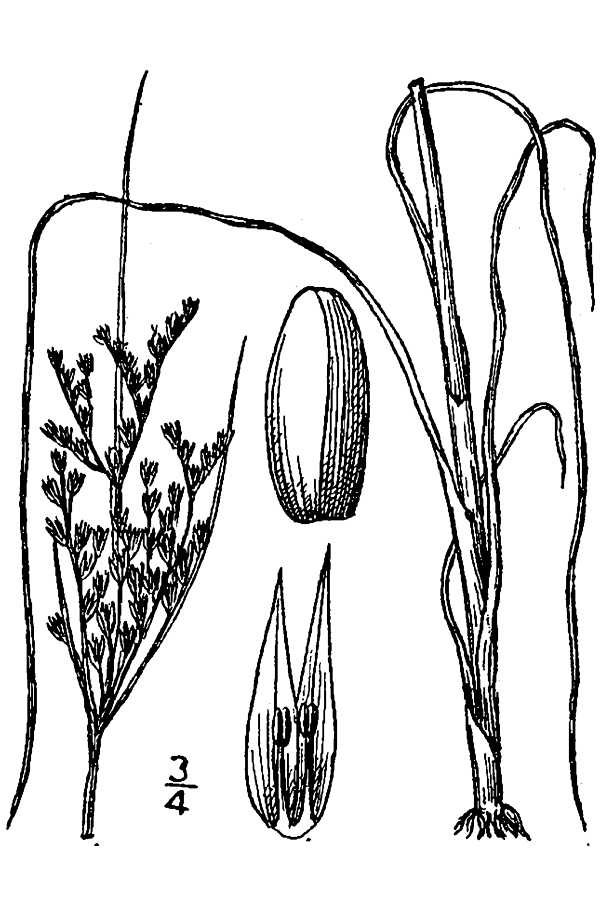

Scientific classification
- Kingdom: Plantae
- Clade: Tracheophytes
- Clade: Angiosperms
- Clade: Monocots
- Clade: Commelinids
- Order: Poales
- Family: Juncaceae
- Genus: Juncus
- Species: J. interior

Binomial name
- Juncus interior Wiegand

= Juncus interior =

Species of grass

Juncus interior is a species of rush. It is known by the common name interior rush, and in its native range also as "soft rush" (which generally refers to J. effusus outside North America).

It is native to the central inlands of North America where it grows in moist areas such as meadows and spring prairies. It can also be found in drier areas.

This is a perennial herb with tufted roots. It has long, flat, narrow leaves with rounded auricles. The flowers are located along the ascending branchlets. They are green with very narrow, pointed sepals and petals and six stamens. The fruits are pale brown capsules which are eaten by waterfowl.
