= Robinson, Kenora District, Ontario =

Robinson
- Location of Robinson in Ontario
- Coordinates: 50°11′04″N 91°16′58″W
- Country: Canada
- Province: Ontario
- Region: Northwestern Ontario
- District: Kenora
- Part: Kenora, Unorganized
- Elevation: 370 m (1,210 ft)
- Time zone: UTC-6 (Central Time Zone)
  - Summer (DST): UTC-5 (Central Time Zone)
- Postal code FSA: P0T
- Area code: 807

Robinson is a railway point and unincorporated place just west of an arm of Marchington Lake on the Sturgeon River in Unorganized Kenora District in northwestern Ontario, Canada.

It lies on the Canadian National Railway transcontinental main line, between Ghost River to the west and Ycliff to the east, has a passing track and is passed but not served by Via Rail transcontinental Canadian trains. There is also a siding east of the lake and river that leads from the main line to the shore.
