= Tetu Lake =

Lake in Kenora District, Ontario, Canada

- Location within Ontario
- Location: Ontario
- Coordinates: 50°11′00″N 95°02′18″W
- Primary inflows: English River, Winnipeg River
- Primary outflows: Winnipeg River
- Basin countries: Canada

Tetu Lake is a lake in Kenora District in northwestern Ontario, Canada. It is approximately 8 kilometres (5.0 mi) from the border with Manitoba.

== See also ==
- List of lakes in Ontario
