= Abram Lake =

Lake in Kenora District, Ontario, Canada

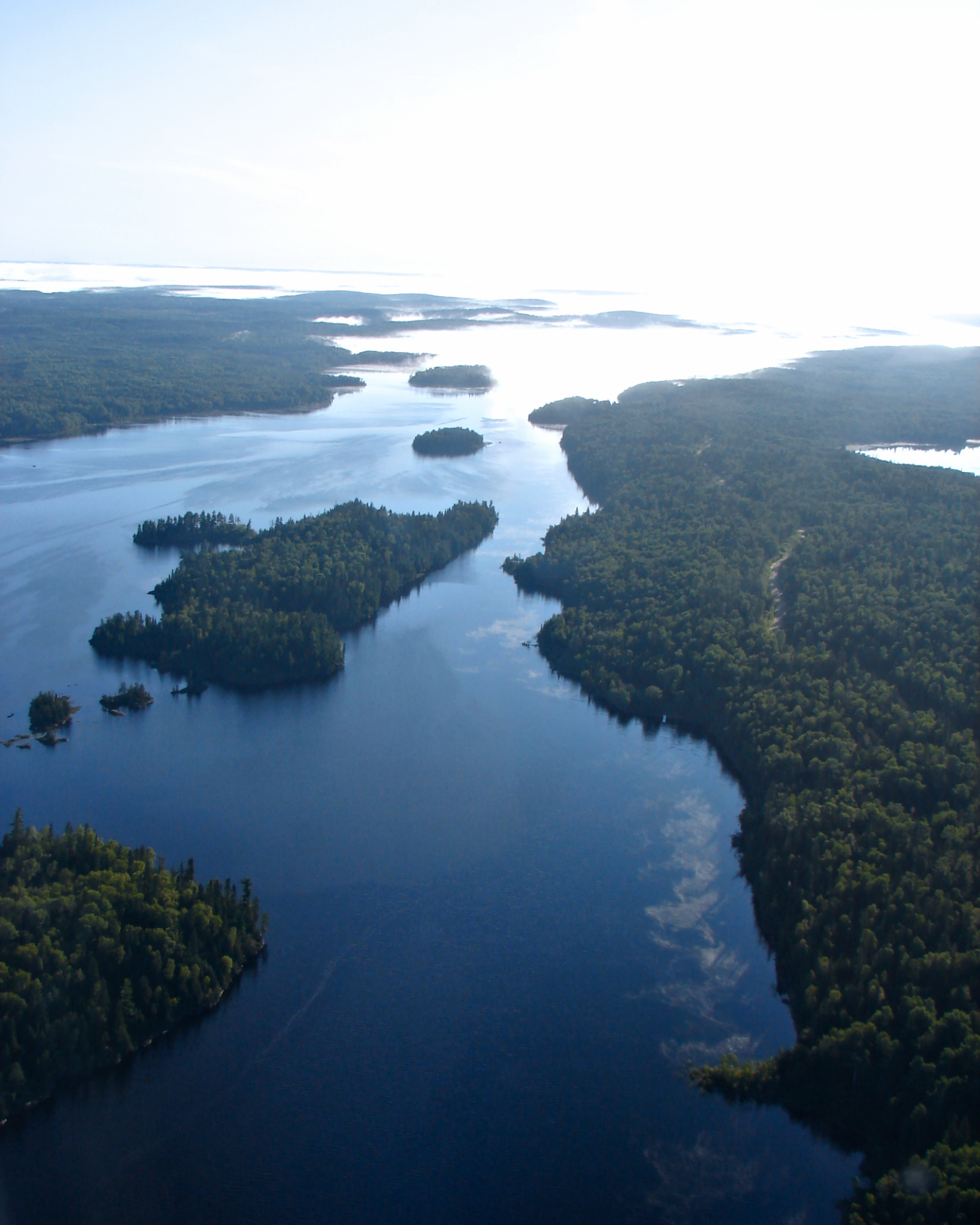
- Sunrise over Abram Lake, looking north-east

- Location in Ontario
- Location: Kenora District, Ontario
- Coordinates: 50°03′33″N 91°55′45″W
- Primary inflows: English River, Marchington River
- Primary outflows: English River
- Basin countries: Canada
- Max. length: 19.3 km (12.0 mi)
- Max. width: 4.3 km (2.7 mi)
- Surface elevation: 356 m (1,168 ft)

Abram Lake is a lake located adjacent to Sioux Lookout in the Kenora District of Northwestern Ontario, Canada. It is at the mouth of the Marchington River and the confluence point of the Marchington River with the English River.

The English River flows from Minnitaki Lake over the Abram Rapids into Abram Lake on the south-east side, and exits over the Frog Rapids into Pelican Lake at Frog Rapids Narrows on the north-west side. The Marchington River enters at the north-east point of the lake.

The lake has an average depth of approximately 12 m (40 ft) and a maximum depth of around 37 m (120 ft), and supports a variety of game fish such as walleye, smallmouth bass, lake trout, and northern pike.

== See also ==
- List of lakes in Ontario
