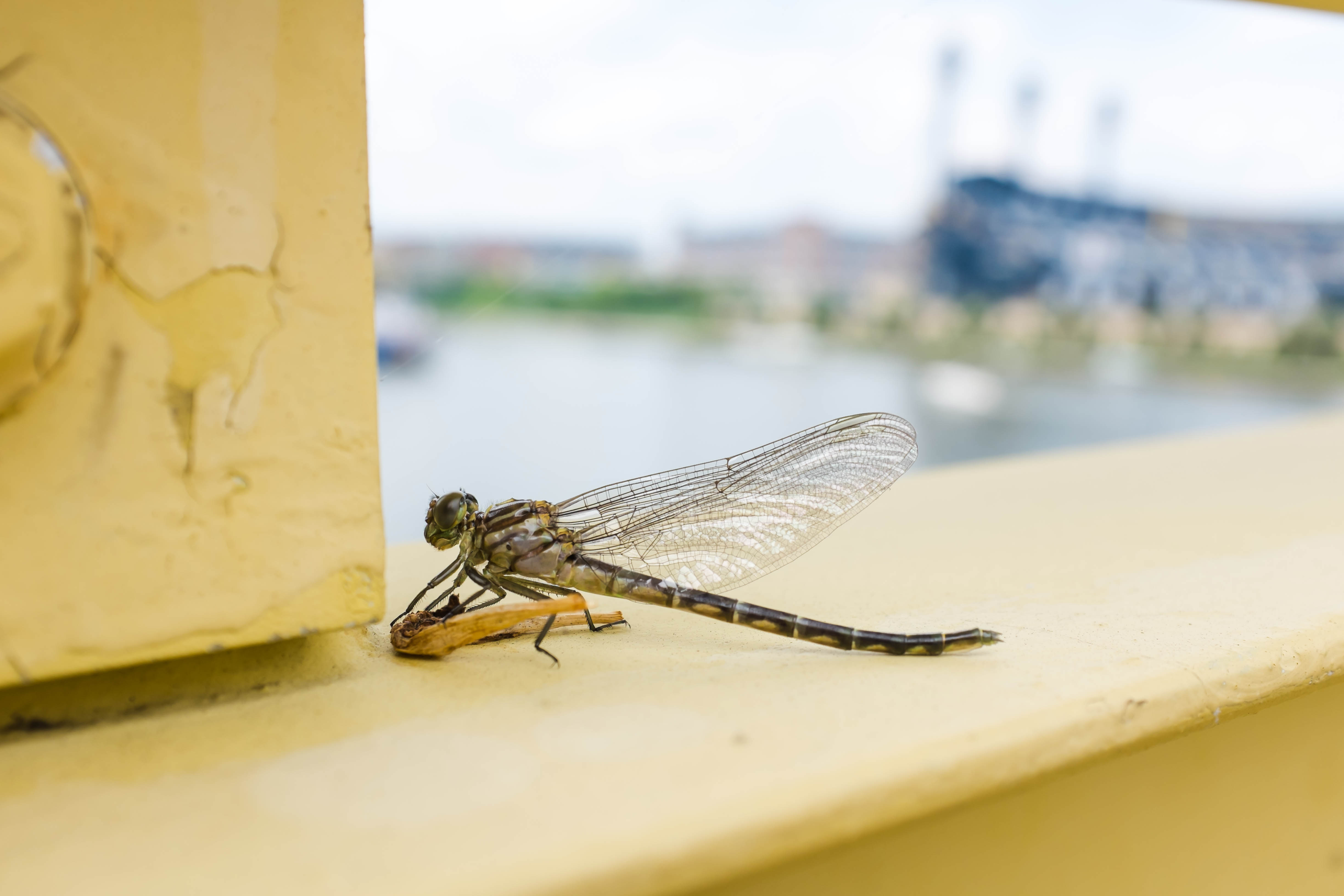

Conservation status
- Least Concern (IUCN 3.1)

Scientific classification
- Kingdom: Animalia
- Phylum: Arthropoda
- Class: Insecta
- Order: Odonata
- Infraorder: Anisoptera
- Family: Gomphidae
- Genus: Stylurus
- Species: S. notatus

Binomial name
- Stylurus notatus (Rambur, 1842)

Synonyms
- Gomphus notatus Rambur, 1842

= Stylurus notatus =

Species of dragonfly

Stylurus notatus, the elusive clubtail, is a species of clubtail in the family of dragonflies known as Gomphidae. It is found in North America.

The IUCN conservation status of Stylurus notatus is "LC", least concern, with no immediate threat to the species' survival. The population is stable.
