= Robinson, Manitoulin District, Ontario =

Coordinates: 45.866434°N 82.866347°W

Robinson is an unincorporated community in Ontario, Canada. It is recognized as a designated place by Statistics Canada.

== Demographics ==
In the 2021 Census of Population conducted by Statistics Canada, Robinson had a population of 149 living in 84 of its 236 total private dwellings, a change of 35.5% from its 2016 population of 110. With a land area of 226.96 km^{2} (87.63 sq mi), it had a population density of 0.7/km^{2} (1.7/sq mi) in 2021.

== See also ==
- List of communities in Ontario
- List of designated places in Ontario
