= Minnitaki Lake =

Lake in Ontario, Canada

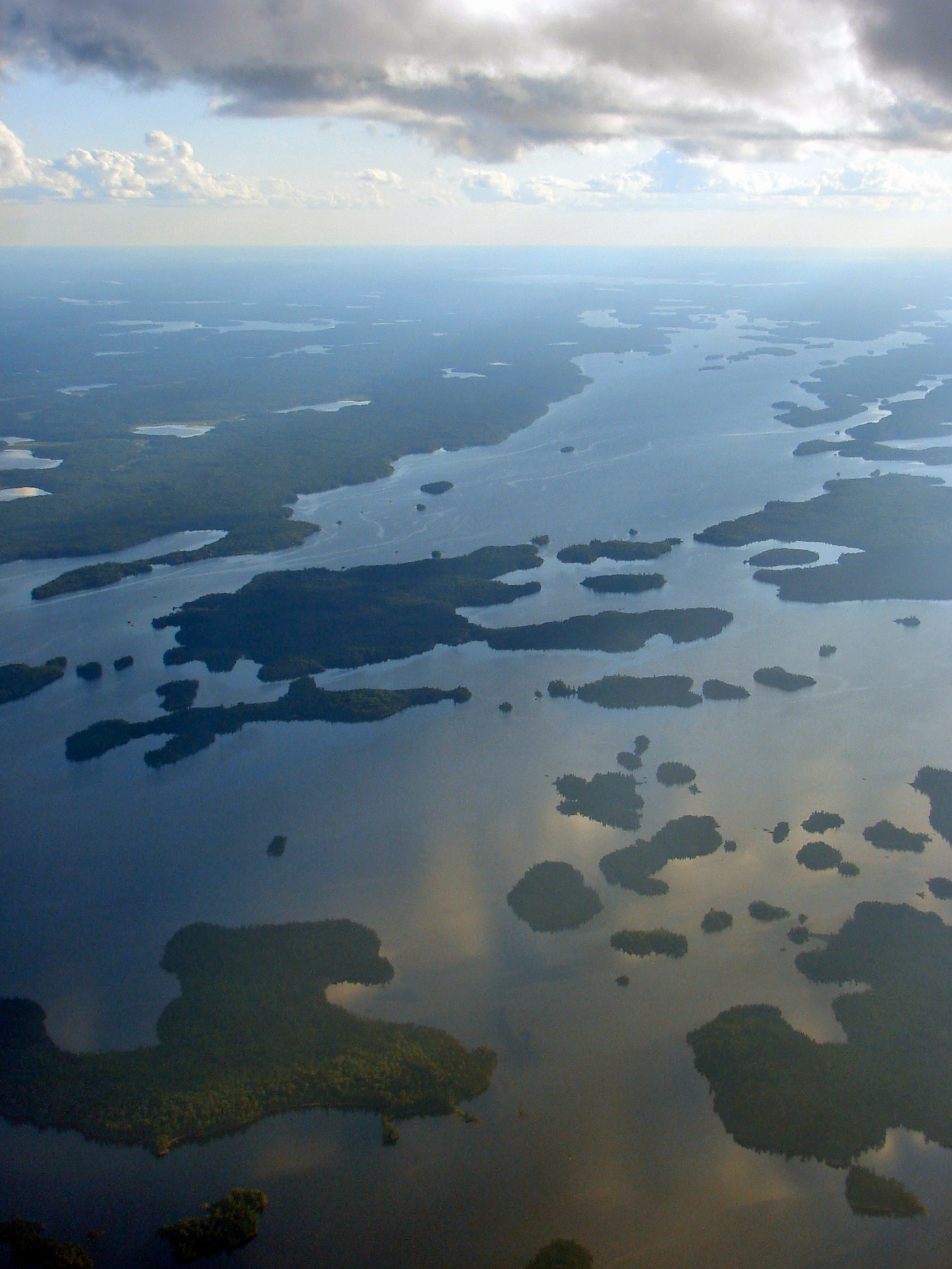

- Location within Ontario
- Location: Ontario
- Coordinates: 50°00′N 91°51′W
- Basin countries: Canada
- Max. length: 38 km (24 mi)
- Max. width: 15 km (9.3 mi)

Minnitaki Lake is a large lake with numerous islands in Kenora District, Ontario, Canada. The nearest city is Sioux Lookout.

== See also ==
- List of lakes in Ontario
