= English River (Ontario) =

River in Ontario, Canada

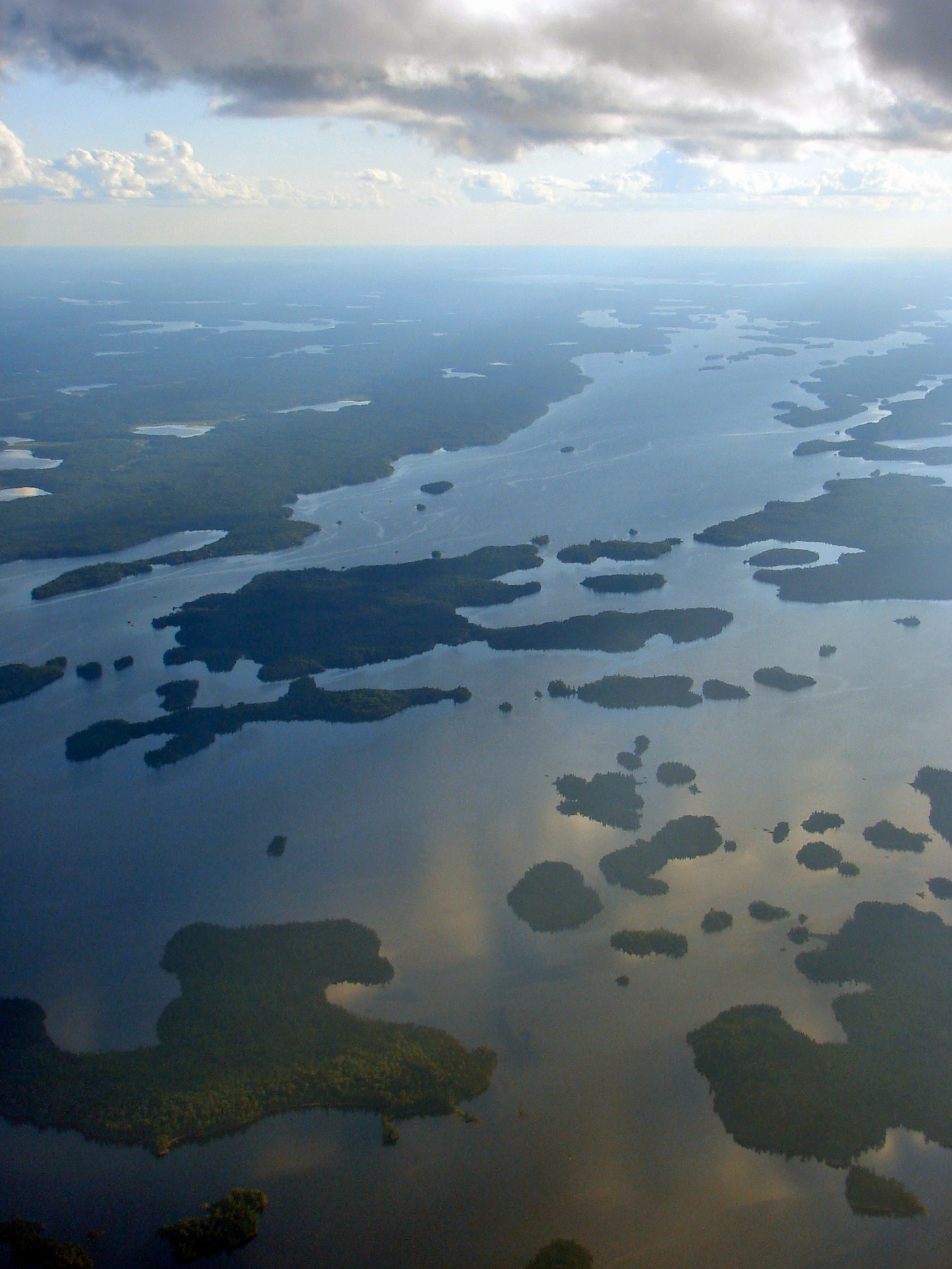

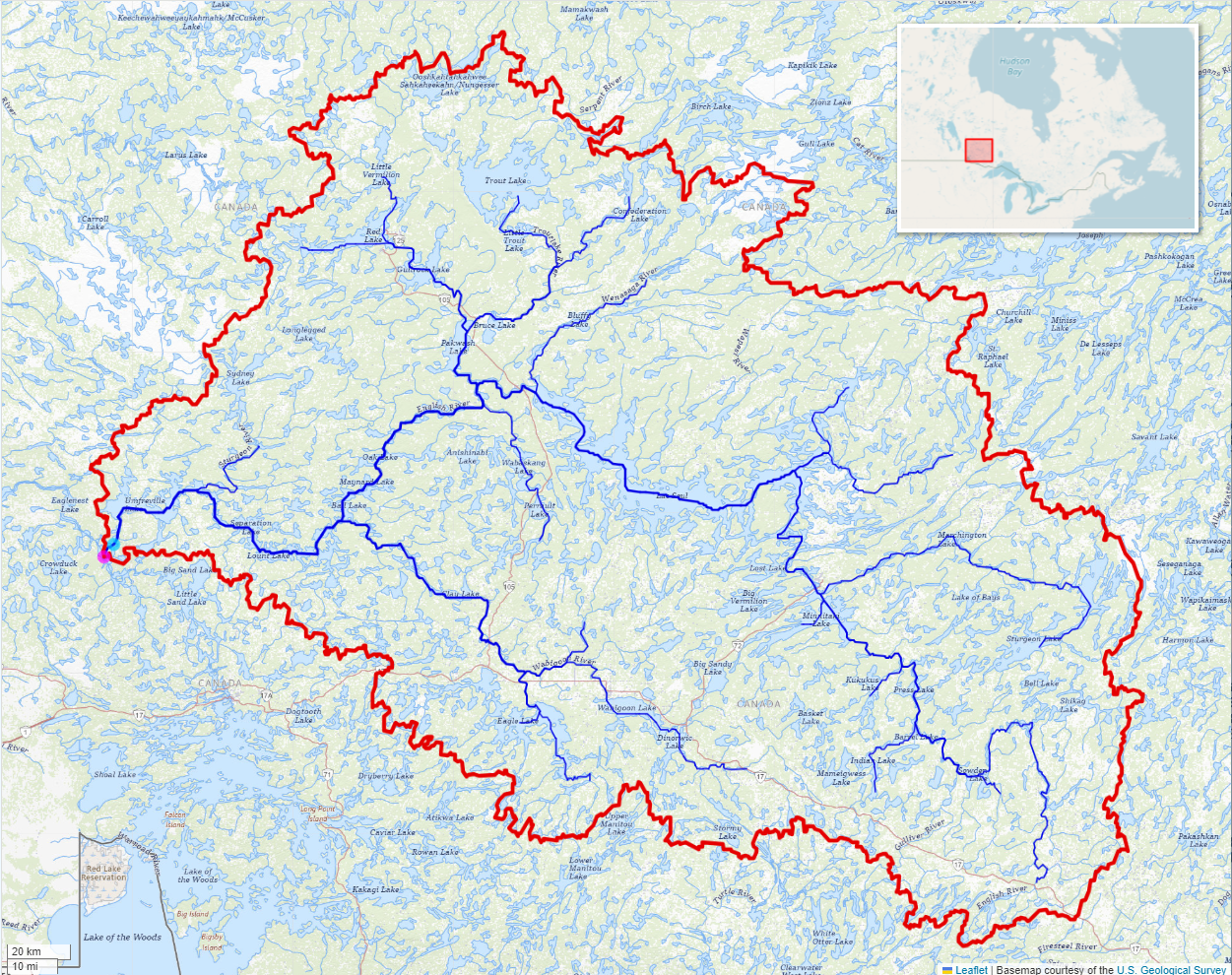
- English River basin

- Location of the mouth of the English River in Ontario

Location
- Country: Canada
- Province: Ontario
- Region: Northwestern Ontario
- Districts: Kenora; Thunder Bay

Physical characteristics
- Source: Unnamed lake
  - coordinates: 49°12′54″N 90°43′37″W
  - elevation: 461 m (1,514 ft)
- Mouth: Tetu Lake
  - coordinates: 50°12′05″N 95°00′13″W
  - elevation: 300 m (984 ft)
- Length: 615 km (382 mi)
- Basin size: 52,300 km^{2} (20,200 sq mi)

Basin features
- Progression: Winnipeg River→ Lake Winnipeg→ Nelson River→ Hudson Bay
- River system: Hudson Bay drainage basin

The English River is a river in Kenora District and Thunder Bay District in Northwestern Ontario, Canada. It flows through Lac Seul to join the Winnipeg River at Tetu Lake as a right tributary. The river is in the Hudson Bay drainage basin, is 615 kilometres (382 mi) long and has a drainage basin of 52,300 square kilometres (20,200 sq mi). Although there are several hydroelectric plants on this river, the English River upstream of Minnitaki Lake is notable as one of the few large river systems in northwestern Ontario with a natural flow and without any upstream source of pollution. It is the fourth longest river entirely in Ontario.

There is also a settlement on the river called English River, located where Highway 17 crosses the river at its confluence with the Scotch River, along with a nearby railway point of the same name, constructed as part of the Canadian Pacific Railway transcontinental main line.

2 non-contiguous segments of the river are protected in 2 separate provincial parks: the East English River Provincial Park and West English River Provincial Park.

== Geography ==
The English River forms in Thunder Bay District, just east of English River settlement on the boundary with Kenora District. Flowing north straddling the district boundary until Mattawa Lake, it continues northwest through Minnitaki Lake and passes Sioux Lookout, the largest town along its course. Through Lac Seul, it flows to its mouth at Tetu Lake on the Winnipeg River, which flows via the Nelson River to Hudson Bay. It flows through numerous lakes during its course.

The Frog Rapids are located at Frog Rapids Narrows (50°04′12″N 91°56′52″W), a short narrows on the English River near Sioux Lookout between Abram Lake and Pelican Lake. The narrows, where Highway 72 across the English River, is formed by two peninsulas between the lakes.

=== Tributaries ===
- Vermilion River
- Wabigoon River

=== Settlements ===
Settlements along its course are (in upstream order):

- Caribou Falls
- Ear Falls
- Kejick Bay / Lac Seul First Nation
- Sioux Lookout
- English River

== Fauna ==
The English River is considered as one of the best fisheries in Ontario. Notable trophy fish species include walleye, northern pike, smallmouth bass, and muskellunge. At least 21 fish species have been identified, including sauger, yellow perch, rock bass, cisco, lake whitefish, and mooneye.

== Hydroelectricity ==
There are 4 hydro-electric generating stations on the English River, owned and operated by Ontario Power Generation.

Installation	Capacity	Head	Turbine units	Year built	Notes
Ear Falls Generating Station	17 MW		4	1930	At outlet of Lac Seul, side-by-side with Lac Seul GS
Lac Seul Generating Station (also known in Ojibway as "Obishikokaang Waasiganikewigamig", meaning White Pine Narrows Generating Station)	12.5 MW	9.78 m (32.1 ft)	1	2009	Side-by-side with Ear Falls GS, built in partnership with the Lac Seul First Nation.
Manitou Generating Station	73 MW		5	1956	20 km (12 mi) downstream of Ear Falls
Caribou Falls Generating Station	92 MW		3	1958	

== See also ==
- List of longest rivers of Canada
- List of Ontario rivers
- Ontario Minamata disease

== Sources ==
- Map 13 (PDF) (Map). 1 : 1,600,000. Official road map of Ontario. Ministry of Transportation of Ontario. 2012-01-01.
- Map 16 (PDF) (Map). 1 : 1,600,000. Official road map of Ontario. Ministry of Transportation of Ontario. 2012-01-01.
- Restructured municipalities - Ontario map #1 (Map). Restructuring Maps of Ontario. Ontario Ministry of Municipal Affairs and Housing. 2006. Archived from the original on 2012-05-05.
