= Marchington River =

- Location of the mouth of the Marchington River in Ontario

Location
- Country: Canada
- Province: Ontario
- Region: Northwestern Ontario
- Districts: Kenora; Thunder Bay

Physical characteristics
- Source: Kashaweogama Lake
  - location: Thunder Bay District
  - coordinates: 50°23′58″N 90°52′11″W
  - elevation: 390 m (1,280 ft)
- Mouth: Abram Lake
  - location: Kenora District
  - coordinates: 50°05′47″N 91°48′14″W
  - elevation: 357 m (1,171 ft)
- Length: 118 km (73 mi)

Basin features
- River system: Hudson Bay drainage basin
- Tributaries
  - left: Houghton Creek, Drive Creek, Sturgeon River, Martin Creek
  - right: North River, Runway Creek

The Marchington River is a river in the Hudson Bay drainage basin located in Kenora and Thunder Bay Districts in northwestern Ontario, Canada. It travels 78 kilometres (48 mi) from its head at Kashaweogama Lake in Thunder Bay District through a series of lakes to Marchington Lake, where it meets the Sturgeon River and North River. It then continues 30 kilometres (19 mi) over the small McDougall Falls and through Botsford Lake before emptying into the English River at Abram Lake near Sioux Lookout.

Highway 516 crosses the river approximately 6.5 km (4.0 mi) north of its confluence with Marchington Lake. Highway 642 and the CN transcontinental rail line cross the river about 4 km (2.5 mi) and 2 km (1.2 mi) respectively upstream of the mouth, near Superior Junction.

== Tributaries ==
- Houghton Creek
- Drive Creek
- Runway Creek
- Marchington Lake
  - Sturgeon River
  - North River
- Martin Creek

== See also ==
- List of rivers of Ontario
