= List of lakes of Ontario: L =

This is a list of lakes of Ontario beginning with the letter L.

== L–Lad ==
- L Lake (Muskoka District)
- L Lake (Parry Sound District)
- L Lake (Nipissing District)
- L'Amable Lake
- La Brash Lake
- La Casse Lake
- La Chapelle Lake
- La Cloche Lake
- La Force Lake
- Lac La France
- La France Lake
- Lac La Mere
- La Rose Lake
- Lac La Vallée
- La Viollette Lake
- LaMotte Lake
- Label Lake
- Lake Labelle
- Labelle Lake (Frontenac County)
- Labelle Lake (Algoma District)
- Labelle Lake (Thunder Bay District)
- Labiche Lake
- Labine Lake (Timiskaming District)
- Labine Lake (Frontenac County)
- Labitiche Lake
- Labrador Lake
- Labreche Lake
- Labree Lake
- Labyrinth Lake
- Lacasse Lake
- Lacey Lake (Frontenac County)
- Lacey Lake (Kenora District)
- Lac LaChapelle
- Lackie Lake
- Lackner Lake
- Lacobeer Lake
- Lacourse Lake
- Laderoute Lake
- Lady Dufferin Lake
- Lady Evelyn Lake
- Lady Lake
- Lady Macdonald Lake
- Lady Maude Lake
- Lady Sydney Lake
- Lady-slipper
- Ladyfair Lake
- Ladysmith Lake

== Laf–Lam ==
- Laf Lake
- Lafarce Lake
- Lafferty Lake
- Lafleur Lake
- Lafleurs Lake
- Lafoe Lake
- Laforest Lake
- Lafortune Lake
- Lafrenieres Lake
- Lafricain Lake
- Lagarde Lake
- Lagg Lake
- Lahaie Lake
- Lahay Lake
- Lahti Lake
- Laidlaw Lake
- Laird Lake
- Laird's Lake
- Laitila Lake
- Lakelet Lake
- Lakin Lake
- Lakoma Lake
- Lalligan Lake
- Lally Lake
- Lalonde Lake (Mattawan)
- Lalonde Lake (Boyd Township, Nipissing District)
- Lalonde Lake (Muskoka District)
- Lalonde Lake (Timiskaming District)
- Lamaune Lake
- Lamb Lake
- Lambchop Lake
- Lambert Lake
- Lamberts Lake (Muskoka District)
- Lamberts Lake (Renfrew County)
- Lamble Lake
- Lambs Lake
- Lamey Lake
- Lamon Lake
- Lamont Lake
- Lamorie Lake
- Lamoth Lake
- Lamothe Lake
- Lamour Lake
- Lampi's Lake
- Lamprey Lake
- Lampson Lake
- Lake La Muir
- Lamy Lake

== Lan ==
- Lancaster Lake (Timiskaming District)
- Lancaster Lake (Kenora District)
- Lance Lake (Sudbury District)
- Lance Lake (Rainy River District)
- Lanceley Lake
- Lancelot Lake
- Land Lake
- Landers Lake
- Landing Lake
- Landings Lake
- Landis Lake
- Landlock Lake
- Landon Lake (Pettypiece Township, Kenora District)
- Landon Lake (Power Lake, Kenora District)
- Landrigan Lake
- Landry Lake (Kenora District)
- Landry Lake (Algoma District)
- Landrys Lake
- Lane Lake (Sudbury District)
- Lane Lake (Parry Sound District)
- Lane Lake (Kenora District)
- Lang Lake (Kenora District)
- Lang Lake (Lang Township, Sudbury District)
- Lang Lake (Curtin Township, Sudbury District)
- Lang Lake (Algoma District)
- Lang Lake (Thunder Bay District)
- Langdon Lake
- Langemarck Lake
- Langevin Lake
- Langfeld Lake
- Langford Lake (Kenora District)
- Langford Lake (Parry Sound District)
- Langford Lake (Nipissing District)
- Langley Lake
- Langridge Lake
- Langstaff Lake
- Lanier Lake
- Lanigan Lake
- Lantern Lake

== Lap–Lar ==
- Lap Lake
- Laparde Lake
- Lapierre Lake
- Lapigamau Lake
- Lapointe Lake
- Lapp Lake
- Lapworth Lake
- Larabie Lake
- Larby Lake
- Larch Lake
- Lard Lake
- Larder Lake
- Lariat Lake
- Larix Lake
- Lark Lake (Kenora District)
- Lark Lake (Rainy River District)
- Lark Lake (Nipissing District)
- Larkin Lake (Algoma District)
- Larkin Lake (Sudbury District)
- Laroche Lake (Thunder Bay District)
- Laroche Lake (Nipissing District)
- Larocque Lake (Sudbury District)
- Larocque Lake (Kenora District)
- Larocques Lake
- Laronde Lake
- Larrabee Lake
- Larrett Lake
- Larry Lake (Algoma District)
- Larry Lake (Timiskaming District)
- Larry Lake (Fox Creek, Thunder Bay District)
- Larry Lake (Larry Creek, Thunder Bay District)
- Larry Lake (Nipissing District)
- Larsh Lake
- Larson Lake (Kenora District)
- Larson Lake (Parry Sound District)
- Larus Lake

== Las–Lau ==
- Lascelles Lake
- Lasseter Lake
- Lassetter Lake
- Lassie Lake
- Lasswade Lake
- Last Lake (Parry Sound District)
- Last Lake (Kenora District)
- Lastcedar Lake
- Lasucor Lake
- Late Lake
- Lateral Lake
- Latimer Lake
- Latouche Lake
- Latour Lake
- Latreille Lake
- Lature Lake
- Lauber Lake
- Lauder Lake
- Laughing Bird Lake
- Laughing Lake
- Laughren Lake
- Laughter Lake
- Laughton Lake
- Laundrie Lake
- Laundry Lake (Sudbury District)
- Laundry Lake (Hastings County)
- Laundry Lake (Greater Sudbury)
- Laura Lake (Biscotasi Township, Sudbury District)
- Laura Lake (McConnell Township, Sudbury District)
- Laura Lake (Algoma District)
- Laurad Lake
- Lauramay Lake
- Laurel Lake (Nipissing District)
- Laurel Lake (Waterloo Region)
- Laurence Lake
- Laurensons Lake
- Lake Laurentian
- Lauri Lake
- Laurie Lake
- Laurier Lake (Kenora District)
- Laurier Lake (Parry Sound District)
- Lautons Lake
- Lauzon Lake (Algoma District)
- Lauzon Lake (Cochrane District)

== Lav–Laz ==
- Laval Lake
- Lavallee Lake
- Lavallée Lake
- Lavallie Lake
- Lavant Long Lake
- Lavaque Lake
- Lavender Lake
- Laver Lake
- Lavergne Lake
- Lavers Lake
- Lavery Lake (Cochrane District)
- Lavery Lake (Peterborough County)
- Lake Lavieille
- Lavigne Lake
- Lavis Lake
- Lavo Lake
- Lavoie Lake (Timiskaming District)
- Lavoie Lake (Kenora District)
- Law Lake (Seine River, Rainy River District)
- Law Lake (Little Turtle River, Rainy River District)
- Lawagamau Lake
- Lawe Lake
- Lawgrave Lake
- Lawlar Lake
- Lawless Lake
- Lawlor Lake
- Lawren Harris Lake
- Lawrence Lake (Algoma District)
- Lawrence Lake (Sudbury District)
- Lawrence Lake (Haliburton County)
- Lawrence Lake (Hill Lake, Kenora District)
- Lawrence Lake (Bloodvein River, Kenora District)
- Lawson Lake (Sudbury District)
- Lawson Lake (Kenora District)
- Lawson Lake (Thunder Bay District)
- Lawson Lake (Parry Sound District)
- Lay Lake
- Laycocks Lake
- Lazell Lake
- Lazy Lake (Renfrew County)
- Lazy Lake (Durham Region)
- Lazy Lake (Kenora District)

== Lea–Lec ==
- Leach Lake (Thunder Bay District)
- Leach Lake (Leach Creek, Kenora District)
- Leach Lake (Sioux Narrows-Nestor Falls)
- Leach Lake (McLaren Township, Nipissing District)
- Leach Lake (Finnlayson Township, Nipissing District)
- Leach Lake (Algoma District)
- Leach Lake (Sudbury District)
- Leach Lake (Cochrane District)
- Leachman Lake
- Leacock Lake
- Leadbeater Lake
- Leaden Lake
- Leader Lake
- Leaf Lake (Haliburton County)
- Leaf Lake (Algoma District)
- Leaf Lake (Nipissing District)
- Leafield Lake
- Leake Lake
- Leaming Lake
- Leaning Lake
- Leaning Pine Lake
- Leaningstone Lake
- Leano Lake
- Lear Lake
- Leask Lake
- Least Lake
- Leather Root Lake
- Leatherhead Lake
- Leatherleaf Lake (Sudbury District)
- Leatherleaf Lake (Nipissing District)
- Leatherroot Lake
- Leaver Lake
- Leavitt Lake
- Lebel Lake
- Lebell Lake
- Le Blanc Lake
- Leblanc Lake (Cochrane District)
- Leblanc Lake (Sudbury District)
- Leckey Lake
- Leckie Lake
- Leclairc Lake
- Leclaire Lake
- Lecompte Lake
- Leconte Lake
- Lecours Lake

== Led–Leh ==
- Ledingham Lake
- Leduc Lake
- Ledyard Lake
- Lake Lee
- Lee Lake (Nipissing District)
- Lee Lake (Long Lake, Kenora District)
- Lee Lake (Sudbury District)
- Lee Lake (Killala Township, Kenora District)
- Lee Lake (Cochrane District)
- Lee Lake (Thunder Bay District)
- Lee Lake (Muskoka District)
- Lee Lake (Renfrew County)
- Leece Lake
- Leech Lake (Sudbury District)
- Leech Lake (Muskoka District)
- Lees Lake
- Leeson Lake
- Leether Lake
- Le Faive Lake
- Lefever Lake
- Lefroy Lake
- Left Lake
- Lefteye Lake
- Leg Lake (Pearkes Township, Algoma District)
- Leg Lake (Kenora of District)
- Leg Lake (Esquega Township, Algoma District)
- Leg of Lamb Lake
- Legarde Lake
- Legare Lake
- Legault Lake (Greenstone)
- Legault Lake (Cochrane District)
- Legault Lake (St. Ignace Island)
- Legear Lake
- Legend Lake
- Leggat Lake
- Legge Lake (Jarvis Township, Algoma District)
- Legge Lake (Legge Township, Algoma District)
- Leggo Lake
- Legris Lake
- Le Gros Lake
- Legros Lake
- Le Grou Lake
- Le Heup Lake
- LeHeup Lake
- Lehmann Lake
- Lehtinen Lake

== Lei–Leo ==
- Leidtke Lake
- Leigh Lake
- Leinster Lake
- Leishman Lake
- Leitch Lake
- Lelonde Lake
- Lemay Lake
- Lemieux Lake (Timiskaming District)
- Lemieux Lake (Renfrew County)
- Lemke Lake
- Lemoine Lake (Sudbury District)
- Lemoine Lake (Timiskaming District)
- Lemon Lake (Boyce Township, Cochrane District)
- Lemon Lake (Nixon Township, Cochrane District)
- Lemon Lake (Haliburton County)
- Lemonade Lake
- Lemont Lake
- Le Moyne Lake
- Len Lake
- Lena Lake (Kenora District)
- Lena Lake (Muskoka District)
- Lena Lake (Nipissing District)
- Lena Lake (Algoma District)
- Lena Lake (Thunder Bay District)
- Length Lake (Nipissing District)
- Length Lake (Thunder Bay District)
- Lennan Lake
- Lennon Lake (Algoma District)
- Lennon Lake (Parry Sound District)
- Lennon Lake (Hastings County)
- Lenore Lake (Thunder Bay District)
- Lenore Lake (Nipissing District)
- Lenoury Lake
- Lenover Lake
- Leo Lake (Frontenac County)
- Leo Lake (Magnesium Lake, Kenora District)
- Leo Lake (Colenso Township, Kenora District)
- Leo Lake (Thunder Bay District)
- Leo's Lake (Algoma District)
- Leo's Lake (Sudbury District)
- Leonard Lake (Inglis Township, Cochrane District)
- Leonard Lake (Sudbury District)
- Leonard Lake (Studholme Township, Cochrane District)
- Leonard Lake (Muskoka District)
- Leonard Lake (Algoma District)
- Leonard Lake (Thunder Bay District)
- Leonard Lake (Kenora District)
- Leone Lake
- Leopard Lake

== Lep–Lez ==
- Lepage Lake
- Lepenski Lake
- Lepha Lake
- Lepp Lake (Cochrane District)
- Lepp Lake (Algoma District)
- Lequyer Lake
- Le Roche Lake
- Lerome Lake
- Leroy Lake (Nipissing District)
- Leroy Lake (Algoma District)
- Leroy Lake (Timiskaming District)
- Leroy Lake (Cochrane District)
- Leroy Lake (Kenora District)
- Lesage Lake
- Lesarge Lake
- Leslie Lake
- Lessard Lake
- Lester Lake
- Leta Lake
- Letain Lake
- Le Tret Lake
- Letson Lake
- Lett Lake (Timiskaming District)
- Lett Lake (Cochrane District)
- Lett Lake (Sudbury District
- Levacque Lake
- Levalley Lake
- Levarg Lake
- Lève Lake
- Lever Lake
- Levert Lake
- Levesque Lake
- Levey Lake
- Levine Lake
- Levit Lake
- Levitt Lake
- Lewis Lake (Cochrane District)
- Lewis Lake (Kenora District)
- Lewis Lake (Algoma District)
- Lewis Lake (Manitoulin District)
- Ley Lake
- Leziert Lake

== Lia–Lig ==
- Liason Lake
- Libby Lake
- Libert Lake
- Liberty Lake
- Libra Lake
- Lidstone Lake (Algoma District)
- Lidstone Lake (Thunder Bay District)
- Liebeck Lake
- Lift Lake
- Lift Over Lake
- Light Bulb Lake
- Light Lake
- Lighthall Lake
- Lighthouse Lake (Hastings County)
- Lighthouse Lake (Manitoulin District)
- Lightning Lake
- Ligigami Lake

== Lil–Lim ==
- Lil Lake
- Lila Lake
- Lilac Lake
- Lilium Lake
- Lillabelle Lake
- Lillian Lake
- Lillie Lake
- Lillord Lake
- Lillybet Lake
- Lillycrop Lake
- Lily Lake (Sioux Narrows-Nestor Falls)
- Lily Lake (Peterborough County)
- Lily Lake (Cardwell Township, Muskoka Lakes)
- Lily Lake (Blind River)
- Lily Lake (Timiskaming District)
- Lily Lake (Monck Township, Muskoka Lakes)
- Lily Lake (Manitoulin District)
- Lily Lake (Lake of the Woods, Kenora District)
- Lily Lake (Delmage Township, Sudbury District)
- Lily Lake (Cochrane District)
- Lily Lake (Rainy River District)
- Lily Lake (St.-Charles)
- Lily Lake (Parry Sound District)
- Lily Lake (Hornepayne)
- Lily Lake (Lennox and Addington County)
- Lily Lake (Pistol Lake, Kenora District)
- Lily Lake (Thunder Bay District)
- Lily Lake (Sioux Lookout)
- Lily Pad Lake
- Lilypad Lake (Rainy River District)
- Lilypad Lake (Blind River)
- Lilypad Lake (Garden River 14)
- Lilypad Lake (Kenora District)
- Lilypond Lake
- Limbo Lost Lake
- Limburner Lake
- Lime Lake (Hastings County)
- Lime Lake (Thunder Bay District)
- Lime Lake (Leeds and Grenville United Counties)
- Limerick Lake (Algoma District)
- Limerick Lake (Hastings County)
- Limestone Lake (Thunder Bay District)
- Limestone Lake (Parry Sound District)
- Limestone Lake (Renfrew County)
- Limestone Lake (Hastings County)
- Limit Lake (Ethel Township, Sudbury District)
- Limit Lake (Hastings County)
- Limit Lake (Turner Township, Sudbury District)
- Limited Lake
- Limpid Lake

== Lin ==
- Linbarr Lake
- Lincoln Lake (Kenora District)
- Lincoln Lake (Sudbury District)
- Lind Lake
- Linda Lake (Nipissing District)
- Linda Lake (Manitoulin District)
- Lindbergh Lake
- Lindel Lake
- Lindgren Lake
- Lindholm Lake
- Lindsay Lake (Rainy River District)
- Lindsay Lake (Frontenac County)
- Lindsley Lake
- Line Lake (Shoal Lake, Kenora District)
- Line Lake (Knicely Township, Algoma District)
- Line Lake (Nipissing District)
- Line Lake (Cochrane District)
- Line Lake (Thunder Bay District)
- Line Lake (Sudbury District)
- Line Lake (Dulhut Township, Algoma District)
- Line Lake (Atikwa Lake, Kenora District)
- Lineal Lake
- Linear Lake
- Linekar Lake
- Lineus Lake
- Ling Lake
- Linge Lake
- Lingen Lake
- Linger Lake
- Linger Long Lake
- Lingham Lake (Hastings County)
- Lingman Lake (Kenora District)
- Lingo Lake
- Lingwood Lake
- Linimint Lake
- Linington Lake
- Link Lake (Kenora District)
- Link Lake (Nipissing District)
- Link Lake (Timiskaming District)
- Linklater Lake (Kenora District)
- Linklater Lake (Thunder Bay District)
- Linnet Lake
- Linstead Lake
- Linton Lake (Thunder Bay District)
- Linton Lake (Sudbury District)

== Lio–Lis ==
- Lionel Lake
- Lioness Lake
- Lip Lake
- Lipscombe Lake
- Lipsett Lake (Cochrane District)
- Lipsett Lake (Sudbury District)
- Lipsy Lake
- Lipton Lake (Algoma District)
- Lipton Lake (Timiskaming District)
- Lira Lake
- Lake Lisgar
- Lisgar Lake
- Lismer Lake
- Lissons Lake
- Lister Lake (Nipissing District)
- Lister Lake (Kenora District)

== Lita–Little A ==
- Lita Lake
- Little Lake (South Crosby Township, Rideau Lakes)
- Little Lake (White River)
- Little Lake (Wellington County)
- Little Lake (Bastard Township, Rideau Lakes)
- Little Lake (Northumberland County)
- Little Lake (Renfrew County)
- Little Lake (Frontenac County)
- Little Lake (Hanna Township, Cochrane District)
- Little Lake (Benedickson Township, Algoma District)
- Little Lake (Springwater)
- Little Lake (Midland)
- Little Lake (Peterborough County)
- Little Lake (Bruce County)
- Little Lake (Georgian Bay)
- Little Lake (Lahontan Township, Thunder Bay District)
- Little Lake (Gravenhurst)
- Little Lake (Blind River)
- Little Lake (Lanark County)
- Little Lake (Nipissing District)
- Little Lake (Sioux Lookout)
- Little Lake (Little Township, Cochrane District)
- Little Lake (Barbara Township, Thunder Bay District)
- Little Abitibi Lake
- Little Addie Lake
- Little Agassiz Lake
- Little Agawa Lake
- Little Aguasabon Lake
- Little Akron Lake
- Little Alice Lake
- Little Allen Lake
- Little Allenby Lake
- Little Amesdale Lake
- Little Amethyst Lake
- Little Amik Lake (Kenora District)
- Little Amik Lake (Thunder Bay District)
- Little Amy Lake
- Little Anaway Lake
- Little Anderson Lake
- Little Anstruther Lake
- Little Antler Lake
- Little Arbeesee Lake
- Little Arbutus Lake
- Little Arrowhead Lake
- Little Art Lake
- Little Asinn Lake
- Little Athelstane Lake
- Little Audrey Lake
- Little Ault Lake
- Little Aurora Lake
- Little Avery Lake (Haliburton County)
- Little Avery Lake (Sudbury District)
- Little Aylsworth Lake

== Little Ba–Little Bi ==
- Little Bald Lake
- Little Balsam Lake
- Little Bar Lake
- Little Barker Lake
- Little Basket Lake
- Little Bass Lake (Renfrew County)
- Little Bass Lake (Sudbury District)
- Little Basswood Lake
- Little Bear Lake (Roosevelt Township, Sudbury District)
- Little Bear Lake (Algoma District)
- Little Bear Lake (Thunder Bay District)
- Little Bear Lake (Frontenac County)
- Little Bear Lake (Bonar Township, Sudbury District)
- Little Bear Lake (Lennox and Addington County)
- Little Bear Lake (Kenora District)
- Little Beaver Lake (Keating Additional Township, Algoma District)
- Little Beaver Lake (Sudbury District)
- Little Beaver Lake (Frontenac County)
- Little Beaver Lake (Monestime Township, Algoma District)
- Little Beaver Lake (Parry Sound District)
- Little Bell Lake
- Little Bicknell Lake
- Little Biggs Lake
- Little Billings Lake
- Little Birch Lake (Algoma District)
- Little Birch Lake (Lennox and Addington County)
- Little Birch Lake (Hastings County)
- Little Bishop Lake

== Little Bl–Little Bu ==
- Little Black Lake (Timiskaming District)
- Little Black Lake (Frontenac County)
- Little Black Lake (Brudenell, Lyndoch and Raglan)
- Little Black Lake (Greater Madawaska)
- Little Blackduck Lake
- Little Blackstone Lake
- Little Blue Lake
- Little Blueberry Lake
- Little Bob Lake
- Little Bonanza Lake
- Little Bonhomme Lake
- Little Boot Lake
- Little Borutski Lake
- Little Boshkung Lake
- Little Boulder Lake
- Little Boulter Lake
- Little Bowler Lake
- Little Boy Lake
- Little Bradburn Lake
- Little Branch Lake
- Little Brebeuf Lake
- Little Brother Lake
- Little Brothers Lake
- Little Brown Lake
- Little Brute Lake
- Little Buckhorn Lake
- Little Bull Lake (Sudbury District)
- Little Bull Lake (Algoma District)
- Little Burnt Lake (Nipissing District)
- Little Burnt Lake (Hastings County)
- Little Burwash Lake
- Little Butler Lake
- Little Butt Lake (Nipissing District)
- Little Butt Lake (Parry Sound District)

== Little Ca–Little Ch ==
- Little Calhoun Lake
- Little Cameron Lake (Timiskaming District)
- Little Cameron Lake (Algoma District)
- Little Camp Lake
- Little Canoe Lake (Frontenac County)
- Little Canoe Lake (Haliburton County)
- Little Carcajou Lake
- Little Cards Lake
- Little Caribou Lake (Parry Sound District)
- Little Caribou Lake (Thunder Bay District)
- Little Carney Lake
- Little Carre Lake
- Little Carson Lake
- Little Casgrain Lake
- Little Caskill Lake
- Little Cat Lake
- Little Cauchon Lake
- Little Cauliflower Lake
- Little Caution Lake
- Little Cave Lake
- Little Cavers Lake
- Little Cedar Lake (Thunder Bay District)
- Little Cedar Lake (Lennox and Addington County)
- Little Cedar Lake (Algoma District)
- Little Cedar Lake (Nipissing District)
- Little Chandos Lake
- Little Charon Lake
- Little Chelsea Lake
- Little Chiblow Lake
- Little Chief Lake (Sudbury District)
- Little Chief Lake (Timiskaming District)
- Little Chill Lake
- Little Chowder Lake

== Little Cl–Little Cy ==
- Little Clam Lake (Sudbury District)
- Little Clam Lake (Parry Sound District)
- Little Claw Lake
- Little Lake Clear
- Little Clear Lake (Parry Sound District)
- Little Clear Lake (Frontenac County)
- Little Clear Lake (Notman Township, Nipissing District)
- Little Clear Lake (Boulter Township, Nipissing District)
- Little Clear Lake (Haliburton County)
- Little Club Lake
- Little Coat Lake
- Little Coburn Lake
- Little Connon Lake
- Littlecoot Lake
- Little Crag Lake
- Little Craig Lake
- Little Cranberry Lake (Renfrew County)
- Little Cranberry Lake (Muskoka District)
- Little Cranberry Lake (Frontenac County)
- Little Crooked Lake
- Little Crookstick Lake
- Little Crosby Lake
- Little Cross Lake
- Little Crow Lake
- Little Cruiser Lake
- Little Cypress Lake

== Little D ==
- Little Davidson Lake
- Little Dawson Lake
- Little Dead Lake
- Little Dead Otter Lake
- Little Delink Lake
- Little Desbiens Lake
- Little Detour Lake
- Little Devil Lake
- Little Dickson Lake
- Little Dishnish Lake
- Little Doe Lake
- Littledoe Lake
- Little Dog Lake
- Little Dogtooth Lake
- Little Donald Lake
- Little Dossier Lake
- Little Dotty Lake
- Little Dougherty Lake
- Little Dowsley Lake
- Little Dragon Lake
- Little Drew Lake
- Little Drowning Lake
- Little Drummer Lake
- Little Duck Lake (Thunder Bay District)
- Little Duck Lake (Algoma District)
- Little Dudmon Lake
- Little Dunbar Lake

== Little E–Little F ==
- Little Eagle Lake (Nipissing District)
- Little Eagle Lake (Timiskaming District)
- Little Eagle Lake (Kenora District)
- Little East Lake
- Little Eastend Lake
- Little Ella Lake
- Little Ellis Lake
- Little Eneas Lake
- Little Enid Lake
- Little Ermine Lake
- Little Esker Lake (Timiskaming District)
- Little Esker Lake (Cochrane District)
- Little Esson Lake
- Little Esther Lake
- Little Etta Lake
- Little Eva Lake (Pickerel River, Rainy River District)
- Little Eva Lake (Namakan River, Rainy River District)
- Little Eye Lake
- Little Fairbank Lake
- Little Fakeloo Lake
- Little Falls Lake (Rainy River District)
- Little Falls Lake (Thunder Bay District)
- Little Finch Lake
- Little Finlander Lake
- Little Fire Lake
- Little Flood Lake
- Little Fly Lake
- Little Folson Lake
- Littlefools Lake
- Littleford Lake
- Little Forks Lake
- Little Fox Lake (Kenora District)
- Little Fox Lake (Lennox and Addington District)
- Little Franklin Lake
- Little Frey Lake
- Little Friday Lake
- Little Fry Lake

== Little G ==
- Little Gabodin Lake
- Little Gaffney Lake
- Little Galipo Lake
- Little Gallander Lake
- Little Ganell Lake
- Little Garvin Lake
- Little Lake George
- Little German Lake
- Little Gibson Lake
- Little Gillies Lake
- Little Glamor Lake
- Little Goat Lake
- Little Godin Lake
- Little Gooch Lake
- Little Goosander Lake
- Little Goose Lake (Piskegomang Brook, Kenora District)
- Little Goose Lake (Cochrane District)
- Little Goose Lake (Twinflower Lake, Kenora District)
- Little Gooseneck Lake
- Little Gordon Lake
- Little Gorman Lake
- Little Graham Lake
- Little Grassy Lake (Rainy River District)
- Little Grassy Lake (Cochrane District)
- Little Grassy Lake (Timiskaming District)
- Little Green Lake (Lanark County)
- Little Green Lake (Denbigh Township, Addington Highlands)
- Little Green Lake (Renfrew County)
- Little Green Lake (Abinger Township, Addington Highlands)
- Little Green Lake (North Canonto Township, North Frontenac)
- Little Green Lake (Clarendon Township, North Frontenac)
- Little Greenwater Lake
- Little Greer Lake
- Little Grey Trout Lake
- Little Grizzly Lake
- Little Gull Lake (Thunder Bay District)
- Little Gull Lake (Haliburton County)
- Little Gull Lake (Sudbury District)
- Little Gull Lake (Lennox and Addington County)
- Little Gull Lake (Kenora District)
- Little Gun Lake
- Little Gunflint Lake
- Little Gurr Lake

== Little H–Little I ==
- Little Haas Lake
- Little Hagarty Lake
- Little Hannah Lake
- Little Harburn Lake
- Little Hardwood Lake (Timiskaming District)
- Little Hardwood Lake (Renfrew County)
- Little Hardy Lake
- Little Harriet Lake
- Little Harris Lake
- Little Harry Lake
- Little Hart Lake
- Little Hawk Lake
- Little Hawkcliff Lake
- Little Hawkeye Lake
- Little Hawley Lake
- Little Hay Lake
- Little Helen Lake
- Little Hellangone Lake
- Little Hemlock Lake
- Little Hewitt Lake
- Little Hicky Lake
- Little Hilma Lake
- Little Hindon Lake
- Little Hogan Lake
- Little Holland Lake
- Little Hoover Lake
- Little Horne Lake
- Little Huck Lake
- Little Hungry Lake (Wilson Township, Parry Sound District)
- Little Hungry Lake (Kearney)
- Little Hunter Lake
- Little Huron Lake
- Little Ice Lake
- Little Indian Lake
- Little Irene Lake (Kenora District)
- Little Irene Lake (Sudbury District)
- Little Island Lake (Nipissing District)
- Little Island Lake (Sudbury District)
- Little Italy Lake

== Little J–Little K ==
- Little Jack Lake (Peterborough County)
- Little Jake Lake (Thunder Bay District)
- Little Jarvis Lake
- Little Jean Lake (Haliburton County)
- Little Jean Lake (Rainy River District)
- Little Jet Lake
- Little Jocko Lake
- Little Joe Lake (Cochrane District)
- Little Joe Lake (Nipissing District)
- Little Joe Lake (Rainy River District)
- Little Joe Lake (Whitefish River, Kenora District)
- Little Joe Lake (Tustin Township, Kenora District)
- Little Joes Lake
- Little John Lake (Sudbury District)
- Little John Lake (Thunder Bay District)
- Little John Lake (Parry Sound District)
- Little John Lake (Frontenac County)
- Little Johns Lake
- Little Lake Joseph
- Little Judge Lake
- Little Jungfrau Lake
- Little Juniper Lake
- Little Kabaigon Lake
- Little Kalmar Lake
- Little Kalsas Lake
- Little Kapikog Lake
- Little Kassagimini Lake
- Little Kearney Lake
- Little Kelly Lake
- Little Kennisis Lake
- Little Kesagami Lake
- Little Kishkutena Lake
- Little Kowka Lake

== Little L ==
- Little La Cloche Lake
- Little LaFrance Lake
- Little Lafoe Lake
- Little Lapierre Lake
- Little Larder Lake
- Little Laundrie Lake
- Little Leech Lake (Sudbury District)
- Little Leech Lake (Muskoka District)
- Little Legarde Lake
- Little Lemoine Lake
- Little Lighthouse Lake
- Little Limestone Lake
- Little Lipton Lake
- Little Lobster Lake
- Little Lonely Lake
- Little Long Lake (Parry Sound District)
- Little Long Lake (Frontenac County)
- Little Long Lake (Nipissing District)
- Little Long Lake (Leeds and Grenville United Counties)
- Little Long Lake (Sudbury District)
- Little Long Lake (Algoma District)
- Little Long Lake (Peterborough County)
- Little Long Lake (Weslemkoon Lake, Effingham Township, Addington Highlands)
- Little Long Lake (Timiskaming District)
- Little Long Lake (Muskoka District)
- Little Long Lake (Bon Echo Creek, Effingham Township, Addington Highlands
- Little Longer Lake
- Little Loon Lake (Algoma District)
- Little Loon Lake (Peterborough County)
- Little Louie Lake
- Little Low Bush Lake
- Little Lowrie Lake
- Little Loxley Lake
- Little Lynx Lake

== Little Ma–Little Me ==
- Little Mabel Lake
- Little Macutagon Lake
- Little Magiskan Lake
- Little Magnet Lake
- Little Man Lake
- Little Manitouwaba Lake
- Little Manitouwadge Lake
- Little Maple Lake
- Little Marble Lake
- Little Marconi Lake
- Little Margaret Lake
- Little Marjorie Lake
- Little Marl Lake
- Little Marshall Lake
- Little Marten Lake
- Little Masinabik Lake
- Little Massey Lake
- Little Max Lake
- Little May Lake
- Little Mayo Lake
- Little McCaulay Lake (Rainy River District)
- Little McCauley Lake (Nipissing District)
- Little McCausland Lake
- Little McCaw Lake
- Little McCraney Lake
- Little McDougal Lake
- Little McGarry Lake
- Little McKay Lake
- Little McKessock Lake
- Little McNeil Lake
- Little Meach Lake
- Little Mekenak Lake
- Little Mellon Lake
- Little Menard Lake
- Little Merrill Lake (Kenora District)
- Little Merrill Lake (Lennox and Addington County)
- Little Metig Lake
- Little Metionga Lake

== Little Mi–Little My ==
- Little Michaud Lake
- Little Mikwam Lake
- Little Millar Lake
- Little Millward Lake
- Little Miniss Lake
- Little Mink Lake (Nipissing District)
- Little Mink Lake (Lennox and Addington County)
- Little Mink Lake (Frontenac County)
- Little Mink Lake (Sudbury District)
- Little Minnow Lake (Nipissing District)
- Little Minnow Lake (Lanark County)
- Little Misema Lake
- Little Missinaibi Lake
- Little Mississagagon Lake
- Little Misty Lake
- Little Mitten Lake
- Little Mohawk Lake
- Little Moon Lake
- Little Moose Lake (Kenora District)
- Little Moose Lake (Timiskaming District)
- Little Moose Lake (Sudbury District)
- Little Moose Lake (Lennox and Addington)
- Little Moraine Lake
- Little Mose Lake
- Little Moseau Lake
- Little Mosque Lake
- Little Mountain Lake (Nipissing District)
- Little Mountain Lake (Sudbury District
- Little Mountain Lake (Frontenac County)
- Little Mountain Lake (Timiskaming District)
- Little Mud Lake (Lanark Highlands)
- Little Mud Lake (Lennox and Addington County)
- Little Mud Lake (Olden Township, Central Frontenac)
- Little Mud Lake (Portland Township, South Frontenac)
- Little Mud Lake (Tay Valley)
- Little Mud Lake (Bruce County)
- Little Mud Lake (Hinchinbrooke Township, Central Frontenac)
- Little Mud Lake (Kenora District)
- Little Mud Lake (Haliburton County)
- Little Mud Lake (Timiskaming District)
- Little Mud Lake (Pittsburgh Township, South Frontenac)
- Little Muldrew Lake
- Little Mullet Lake
- Little Mulock Lake
- Little Murr Lake
- Little Muskrat Lake
- Little Mykiss Lake

== Little N–Little O ==
- Little Nadine Lake
- Little Nama Lake
- Little Needle Lake
- Little Nelson Lake
- Little Nemebina Lake
- Little Nenemousha Lake
- Little Newt Lake
- Little Night Hawk Lake
- Little Norris Lake
- Little North Lake
- Little North River Lake
- Little Norway Lake
- Little Nye Lake
- Little Oates Lake
- Little Ochig Lake
- Little Orillia Lake
- Little Osler Lake
- Little Otter Lake (Nipissing District)
- Little Otter Lake (Sudbury District)
- Little Otter Lake (Muskoka District)
- Little Otterpelt Lake
- Little Otterslide Lake
- Little Owl Lake
- Little Oxbow Lake

== Little P–Little Q ==
- Little Paguchi Lake
- Little Pagwa Lake
- Little Panache Lake
- Little Papineau Lake
- Little Papoose Lake
- Little Partridge Lake (Thunder Bay District)
- Little Partridge Lake (Parry Sound District)
- Little Patterson Lake
- Little Paul Lake
- Little Pautois Lake
- Little Peckerwood Lake
- Little Pell Lake
- Little Pepperbell Lake
- Little Perch Lake
- Little Percy Lake
- Little Peters Lake
- Little Petry Lake
- Little Peyton Lake
- Little Pharand Lake
- Little Pic Lake
- Little Pichogen Lake
- Little Pickerel Lake (Algoma District)
- Little Pickerel Lake (Kenora District)
- Little Pigeon Lake
- Little Pike Lake (Thunder Bay District)
- Little Pike Lake (Renfrew County)
- Little Pike Lake (Nipissing District)
- Little Pilon Lake
- Little Pine Lake (Chapple)
- Little Pine Lake (Trail Creek, Rainy River District)
- Little Pine Lake (Sudbury District)
- Little Pine Lake (Renfrew County)
- Little Pogamasing Lake
- Little Porphyry Lake
- Little Poshkokagan Lake
- Little Postagoni Lake
- Little Poverty Lake
- Little Prune Lake
- Little Pugawagun Lake
- Little Puskuta Lake
- Little Quinn Lake
- Little Quirke Lake

== Little R ==
- Little Raccoon Lake
- Little Racine Lake
- Little Rae Lake
- Little Raft Lake
- Little Rainy Lake
- Little Raleigh Lake
- Little Ramsbottoms Lake
- Little Rat Lake (Sudbury District)
- Little Rat Lake (Renfrew County)
- Little Rea Lake
- Little Reading Lake
- Little Red Fox Lake
- Little Redhead Lake
- Little Redpine Lake
- Little Redstone Lake (Sudbury District)
- Little Redstone Lake (Haliburton County)
- Little Rice Lake (Sudbury District)
- Little Rice Lake (Algoma District)
- Little Ridley Lake
- Little Ridout Lake
- Little Robinson Lake
- Little Rock Lake (Lennox and Addington County)
- Little Rock Lake (Kenora District)
- Little Rock Lake (Stewart Township, Nipissing District)
- Little Rock Lake (Central Frontenac)
- Little Rock Lake (Sproule Township, Nipissing District)
- Little Rock Lake (South Frontenac)
- Little Rock Lake (North Frontenac)
- Little Rock Lake (Haliburton County)
- Littlerock Lake
- Little Rocky Lake
- Little Rogers Lake
- Little Roland Lake
- Little Rookery Lake
- Little Round Lake (Sudbury District)
- Little Round Lake (Frontenac County)
- Little Round Lake (Madawaska Valley)
- Little Round Lake (North Algona Wilberforce)
- Little Round Lake (Algoma District)
- Little Ruebottom Lake
- Little Rush Lake

== Littles–Little Si ==
- Littles Lake
- Little Sachigo Lake
- Little Saddle Lake
- Little Salmon Lake
- Little Samuelson Lake
- Little Sand Lake (Algoma District)
- Little Sand Lake (Kenora District)
- Little Sandbar Lake
- Little Sandcherry Lake
- Little Sandford Lake
- Little Sanford Lake
- Little Santoy Lake
- Little Sarsfield Lake
- Little Savant Lake
- Little Sawbill Lake
- Littles Back Lake
- Little Scarecrow Lake
- Little Schooner Lake
- Little Scotch Lake
- Little Scovil Lake
- Little Scrag Lake
- Little Sec Lake
- Little Seganku Lake
- Little Selwyn Lake
- Little Serpent Lake
- Little Shabomeka Lake
- Little Shabumeni Lake
- Little Shack Lake
- Little Sharp Lake
- Little Sharrow Lake
- Little Shawanaga Lake
- Little Shebeshekong Lake
- Little Sheguiandah Lake
- Little Shell Lake
- Little Shesheb Lake
- Little Shoe Lake
- Little Shookemi Lake
- Little Shuller Lake
- Little Silver Lake (Lanark County)
- Little Silver Lake (Peterborough County)
- Little Sister Lake

== Little Sk–Little Sw ==
- Little Skull Lake
- Little Skunk Lake (Algoma District)
- Little Skunk Lake (Hastings County)
- Little Smoke Lake
- Little Snakeskin Lake
- Little Snowstorm Lake
- Little Soulier Lake
- Little Southbear Lake
- Little Soyers Lake
- Little Spaniel Lake
- Little Sparkling Lake
- Little Spencer Lake
- Little Spinster Lake
- Little Spring Lake (Hudson)
- Little Spring Lake (Parry Sound District)
- Little Spring Lake (Barber Township, Timiskaming District)
- Little Spruce Lake
- Little Stampede Lake
- Little Star Lake
- Little Steel Lake
- Little Stefansson Lake
- Little Stevens Lake
- Little Stone Lake
- Little Straggle Lake
- Little Stump Lake
- Little Sturge Lake
- Little Sturgeon Lake
- Little Sucker Lake
- Little Sugarbush Lake
- Little Sunfish Lake
- Little Sunken Lake (Haliburton County)
- Little Sunken Lake (Hastings County)
- Little Sunny Lake
- Little Sunshine Lake
- Little Superior Lake
- Little Swan Lake
- Little Swanzy Lake
- Little Swawell Lake

== Little T–Little V ==
- Little Tag Lake
- Little Takwata Lake
- Little Tallan Lake
- Little Tarn Lake
- Little Teepee Lake
- Little Thompson Lake
- Little Thorning Lake
- Little Tilia Lake
- Little Tillie Lake
- Little Tilston Lake
- Little Toad Lake
- Little Tomiko Lake
- Little Toole Lake
- Little Trewartha Lake
- Little Trout Lake (Kincaid Township, Algoma District)
- Little Trout Lake (Nipissing District)
- Little Trout Lake (Ghost River, Thunder Bay District)
- Little Trout Lake (Parry Sound District)
- Little Trout Lake (Hastings County)
- Little Trout Lake (Renfrew County)
- Little Trout Lake (Timiskaming District)
- Little Trout Lake (Cadeau Township, Algoma District)
- Little Trout Lake (Tilly Lake, Thunder Bay District)
- Little Trout Lake (Sioux Narrows-Nestor Falls)
- Little Trout Lake (Troutlake River, Kenora District)
- Little Trout Lake (Sudbury District)
- Little Troutspawn Lake
- Little Tukanee Lake
- Little Tungsten Lake
- Little Turcotte Lake
- Little Turkey Lake
- Little Turnbull Lake
- Little Turtle Lake
- Little Tweed Lake
- Little Twin Lake
- Little Tyne Lake
- Little Valley Lake
- Little Vein Lake
- Little Verdun Lake
- Little Vermilion Lake (Sioux Lookout)
- Little Vermilion Lake (Chukuni River, Kenora District)
- Little Vermilion Lake (Rainy River District)
- Little Vesper Lake
- Little Villeneuve Lake

== Little W–Little Y ==
- Little Wabimimi Lake
- Little Wadsworth Lake
- Little Wakami Lake
- Little Wakwayowkastic Lake
- Little Waldrif Lake
- Little Wanamaker Lake
- Little Wanzatika Lake
- Little Watson Lake
- Little Watt Lake
- Little Wawa Lake
- Little Weasel Lake
- Little Webb Lake
- Little Wedge Lake
- Little Weichel Lake
- Little Wenebegon Lake
- Little Whetstone Lake
- Little Whitefish Lake (Parry Sound District)
- Little Whitefish Lake (Thunder Bay District)
- Little Whitefish Lake (Timiskaming District)
- Little Whitepine Lake
- Little Whitney Lake
- Little Wilson Lake (Parry Sound District)
- Little Wilson Lake (Frontenac County)
- Little Windfall Lake
- Little Winding Lake
- Little Wizard Lake
- Little Wolf Lake (Renfrew County)
- Little Wolf Lake (Parry Sound District)
- Little Wolfe Lake
- Little Wolverine Lake
- Little Woodcock Lake
- Little Wren Lake
- Little Wright Lake (Cochrane District)
- Little Wright Lake (Nipissing District)
- Little Yantha Lake
- Little Yirkie Lake

== Liv–Liz ==
- Liver Lake
- Livermore Lake
- Livingstone Lake
- Lizard Lake (Cochrane District)
- Lizard Lake (Thunder Bay District)
- Lizard Lake (Rainy River District)
- Lizard Lake (Algoma District)
- Lizo Lake
- Lizotte Lake (Algoma District)
- Lizotte Lake (Kenora District)
- Lizz Lake
- Lizzard Lake

== Ll ==
- Lloyd Lake (Black River-Matheson)
- Lloyd Lake (Timiskaming District)
- Lloyd Lake (Algoma District)
- Lloyd Lake (Sudbury District)
- Lloyd Lake (Thunder Bay District)
- Lloyd Lake (Clute Township, Cochrane District)
- Lloydbrook Lake

== Loa–Lod ==
- Loader Lake
- Loam Lake
- Lob Lake
- Lobelia Lake
- Lobo Lake
- Lobster Lake
- Location Lake
- Lochart Lake
- Lochlin Lake
- Lochnan Lake
- Lochness Lake
- Lock Lake
- Locke Lake (Kenora District)
- Locke Lake (Algoma District)
- Lockery Lake
- Lockett Lake (Parry Sound District)
- Lockett Lake (Cochrane District)
- Lockie Lake
- Locking Lake
- Lockpot Lake
- Lodestone Lake (Kenora District)
- Lodestone Lake (Algoma District)
- Lodge Lake (Sudbury District)
- Lodge Lake (Kenora District)
- Lodge Lake (Parry Sound District)
- Lodge Lake (Rainy River District)

== Lof–Lom ==
- Lofquist Lake
- Loft Lake
- Loftus Lake
- Lofty Lake
- Log Boom Lake
- Log Canoe Lake
- Log Lake (Parry Sound District)
- Log Lake (Thunder Bay District)
- Log Lake (Timiskaming District)
- Logan Lake (Timiskaming District)
- Logan Lake (Kawartha Lakes)
- Logan Lake (Algoma District)
- Loganberry Lake
- Loggers Lake (Algoma District)
- Loggers Lake (Kenora District)
- Logging Camp Lake
- Logie Lake
- Logslide Lake
- Lohi Lake
- Lois Lake (Algoma District)
- Lois Lake (Timiskaming District)
- Loken Lake
- Lola Lake (Thunder Bay District)
- Lola Lake (Algoma District)
- Lola Lake (Kenora District)
- Lolligag Lake
- Loch Lomond (Algoma District)
- Loch Lomond (Thunder Bay District)

== Lond–Lone ==
- London Lake
- Londonderry Lake
- Lone Cabin Lake
- Lone Island Lake
- Lone Isle Lake
- Lone Lake (Cochrane District)
- Lone Lake (Sudbury District)
- Lone Lake (Muskoka District)
- Lone Loon Lake
- Lone Tree Lake
- Lonely Island Lake
- Lonely Lake (Macdonald, Meredith and Aberdeen Additional)
- Lonely Lake (Cochrane District)
- Lonely Lake (Sudbury District)
- Lonely Lake (Kenora District)
- Lonely Lake (Dambrossio Township, Algoma District)
- Lonely Lake (Rainy River District)
- Lonely Lake (Thunder Bay District)
- Lonely Lake (Nipissing District)
- Lonesome Lake (Nipissing District)
- Lonesome Lake (Algoma District)
- Lonewolf Lake
- Loney Lake (Parry Sound District)
- Loney Lake (Kenora District)
- Loney Lake (Sudbury District)

== Long (Algoma–Muskoka) ==
Algoma District

- Long Lake (Bruyere Township, Algoma District)
- Long Lake (Fontaine Township, Algoma District)
- Long Lake (Albanel Township, Algoma District)
- Long Lake (Common Township, Algoma District)
- Long Lake (Sampson Township, Algoma District)
- Long Lake (Huron Shores)
- Long Lake (Varley Township, Algoma District)
- Long Lake (The North Shore)

Cochrane District

- Long Lake (Timmins)
- Long Lake (Potter Township, Cochrane District)

Frontenac County

- Long Lake (South Frontenac)
- Long Lake (Central Frontenac

Greater Sudbury

- Long Lake (Norman Township, Greater Sudbury)
- Long Lake (Eden Township, Greater Sudbury)

Haliburton County

- Long Lake (Dysart et al)
- Long Lake (Highlands East)

Hastings County

- Long Lake (Hastings County)

Kawartha Lakes

- Long Lake (Kawartha Lakes)

Kenora District

- Long Lake (Kamungish River, Kenora District)
- Long Lake (Long Lake River, Kenora District)
- Long Lake (Pelican Township, Kenora District)
- Long Lake (Redvers Township, Kenora District)
- Long Lake (Machin)

Lanark County

- Long Lake (Lanark County)

Leeds and Grenville United Counties

- Long Lake (Leeds and Grenville United Counties)

Manitoulin District

- Long Lake (Central Manitoulin)
- Long Lake (Northeastern Manitoulin and the Islands)

Muskoka District

- Long Lake (Cardwell Township, Muskoka Lakes)
- Long Lake (Wood Township, Muskoka Lakes)
- Long Lake (Bracebridge)

== Long (Nipissing–Timiskaming) ==
Nipissing District

- Long Lake (East Ferris)
- Long Lake (Calvin)

Parry Sound District

- Long Lake (Nipissing)
- Long Lake (Humphrey Township, Seguin)
- Long Lake (Proudfoot Township, Kearney)
- Long Lake (East Mills Township, Parry Sound District)
- Long Lake (The Archipelago)
- Long Lake (Joly)
- Long Lake (Foley Township, Seguin)
- Long Lake (Wilson Township, Parry Sound District)
- Long Lake (McCraney Township, Kearney)

Peterborough County

- Long Lake (Havelock-Belmont-Methuen)
- Long Lake (Douro-Dummer)
- Long Lake (North Kawartha)

Rainy River District

- Long Lake (Rainy River District)

Renfrew County

- Long Lake (Greater Madawaska)
- Long Lake (Laurentian Valley)
- Long Lake (Wylie Township, Laurentian Hills)
- Long Lake (Rolph Township, Laurentian Hills)

Simcoe County

- Long Lake (Simcoe County)

Sudbury District

- Long Lake (Turner Township, Sudbury District)
- Long Lake (Spanish-Sable Rivers)
- Long Lake (Kelly Township, Sudbury District)
- Long Lake (Ermatinger Township, Sudbury District)

Thunder Bay District

- Long Lake (Athelstane Lake, Thunder Bay District)
- Long Lake (Coltham Township, Thunder Bay District)
- Long Lake (Laberge Township, Thunder Bay District)
- Long Lake (Terrace Bay)
- Long Lake (Shebandowan Lakes, Thunder Bay District)
- Long Lake (Shuniah)
- Long Lake (Little Falls Lake, Thunder Bay District)

Timiskaming District

- Long Lake (Lorrain Township, Timiskaming District)
- Long Lake (Lebel Township, Timiskaming District)
- Long Lake (Sharpe Township, Timiskaming District)
- Long Lake (Milner Township, Timiskaming District)

== Longa–Lons ==
- Longacre Lake
- Longairy Lake
- Long Alice Lake
- Longbay Lake
- Longboot Lake
- Longbow Lake (Devine Township, Nipissing District)
- Longbow Lake (Kenora District)
- Longbow Lake (Temagami)
- Longcanoe Lake
- Longcome Lake
- Long Dog Lake
- Longer Lake
- Longfellow Lake (Sudbury District)
- Longfellow Lake (Timiskaming District)
- Long Grass Lake
- Long Hike Lake
- Long Island Lake
- Longlegged Lake
- Longline Lake
- Long Mallory Lake
- Long Moose Lake
- Long Muddy Lake
- Long Narrow Lake
- Longneck Lake
- Longnega Lake
- Long Paradise Lake
- Longpine Lake
- Longpoint Lake
- Long Pond Lake (Frontenac County)
- Long Pond Lake (Thunder Bay District)
- Longross Lake
- Longs Lake
- Long Schooner Lake
- Longspur Lake
- Longstone Lake
- Long Thin Lake
- Longvack Lake
- Longwell Lake
- Longworth Lake
- Lonsberry Lake

== Loo ==
- Look Lake
- Lookout Lake (Sudbury District)
- Lookout Lake (Benedickson Township, Kenora District)
- Lookout Lake (Thunder Bay District)
- Lookout Lake (Muskrat Dam Lake, Kenora District)
- Loom Lake
- Loon Call Lake
- Loon Cry Lake
- Loon Lake (McConkey Township, Parry Sound District)
- Loon Lake (Manitoulin District)
- Loon Lake (Beaton Township, Algoma District)
- Loon Lake (Michipicoten Island)
- Loon Lake (Aguasabon River, Thunder Bay District)
- Loon Lake (Moncrieff Township, Sudbury District)
- Loon Lake (Julia River, Thunder Bay District)
- Loon Lake (Kearney)
- Loon Lake (Brown Township, Parry Sound District)
- Loon Lake (Whitestone)
- Loon Lake (Lake of Bays)
- Loon Lake (Blind River)
- Loon Lake (Shuniah)
- Loon Lake (Haliburton County)
- Loon Lake (Killarney)
- Loon Lake (Wilson Township, Parry Sound District)
- Loon Lake (Leeds and Grenville United Counties)
- Loon Lake (Bruce County)
- Loon Lake (Kabinakagami River, Cochrane District)
- Loon Lake (Kenora District)
- Loon Lake (Espanola)
- Loon Lake (Timiskaming District)
- Loon Lake (Rainy River District)
- Loon Lake (Lanark County)
- Loon Lake (Huron Shores)
- Loon Lake (Craig Township, Sudbury District)
- Loon Lake (Nipissing District)
- Loon Lake (Telfer Township, Sudbury District)
- Loon Lake (Iroquois Falls)
- Loon Lake (Bruyere Township, Algoma District)
- Loon Lake (Gravenhurst)
- Loon Lake (Hinchinbrooke Township, Central Frontenac)
- Loon Lake (Oso Township, Central Frontenac)
- Loondrop Lake
- Loonfeather Lake
- Loonhaunt Lake
- Loons Nest Lake
- Loonshot Lake
- Loonskin Lake (Algoma District)
- Loonskin Lake (Nipissing District)
- Loontail Lake
- Loonwing Lake
- Loop Lake (Sudbury District)
- Loop Lake (Thunder Bay District)

== Lop–Lor ==
- Loponen Lake
- Lorbetski Lake
- Lord Lake
- Lordmayor Lake
- Loree Lake
- Loren Lake
- Loreno Lake
- Lorimer Lake
- Lorna Lake
- Lorne Lake (Rugby Township, Kenora District)
- Lorne Lake (Thunder Bay District)
- Lorne Lake (Manitoulin District)
- Lorne Lake (Kerney Lake, Kenora District)
- Lorne Lake (Lorne Creek, Kenora District)
- Lorne Lake (Nipissing District)
- Lornies Lake
- Lornjack Lake
- Lorrain Lake
- Lorraine Lake
- Lorry Lake
- Lorwall Lake

== Lose–Losi ==
- Lose Lake
- Losian Lake

== Lost ==
- Lost Lake (Addington Highlands)
- Lost Lake (Robinson Lake, Rainy River District)
- Lost Lake (Cascaden Township, Sudbury District)
- Lost Lake (Prince Edward County)
- Lost Lake (Havelock-Belmont-Methuen)
- Lost Lake (Mack Creek, Thunder Bay District)
- Lost Lake (Dorion)
- Lost Lake (Hastings County)
- Lost Lake (Spadina Lake, Kenora District)
- Lost Lake (Lac Seul 28)
- Lost Lake (Greater Madawaska)
- Lost Lake (Terrace Bay)
- Lost Lake (Biscotasi Township, Sudbury District)
- Lost Lake (Beauchamp Township, Timiskaming District)
- Lost Lake (French River)
- Lost Lake (Lahontan Township, Thunder Bay District)
- Lost Lake (Eagle Lake, Kenora District)
- Lost Lake (Barron Township, Nipissing District)
- Lost Lake (Janes Township, Sudbury District)
- Lost Lake (Killarney)
- Lost Lake (Dewan Township, Kenora District)
- Lost Lake (Springer Township, Nipissing District)
- Lost Lake (Peever Township, Algoma District)
- Lost Lake (Antrim Township, Sudbury District)
- Lost Lake (Shuniah)
- Lost Lake (Jack Township, Sudbury District)
- Lost Lake (Madawaska Valley)
- Lost Lake (Douro-Dummer)
- Lost Lake (Haliburton County)
- Lost Lake (Foulds Township, Algoma District)
- Lost Lake (Loyalist)
- Lost Lake (Derry Township, Algoma District)
- Lost Lake (Winnipeg River, Kenora District)
- Lost Lake (Cochrane District)
- Lost Lake (Satterly Township, Kenora District)
- Lost Lake (Rainy Lake, Rainy River District)
- Lost Lake (Knowles Township, Thunder Bay District)
- Lost Lake (Gamey Township, Sudbury District)
- Lost Lake (Haultain Township, Timiskaming District)
- Lost Lake (Leeds and Grenville United Counties)
- Lost Lake (GTP Block 6 Township, Thunder Bay District)
- Lost Axe Lake
- Lost Boy Lake
- Lost Cabin Lake
- Lost Coin Lake
- Lost Dog Lake
- Lostend Lake
- Lost Moose Lake
- Lost Otter Lake
- Lost Sky Pilot Lake
- Lost Tower Lake
- Lostwater Lake

== Lot–Lov ==
- Lottit Lake
- Lotus Lake
- Lou Lake
- Loubert Lake
- Louck Lake
- Loucks Lake (Peterborough County)
- Loucks Lake (Sudbury District)
- Loucks Lake (Parry Sound District)
- Loudon Lake
- Lough Garvey
- Loughborough Lake
- Lougheed Lake
- Loughlan Lake
- Loughrin Lake (Sudbury District)
- Loughrin Lake (Nipissing District)
- Louie Lake (Nipissing District)
- Louie Lake (Thunder Bay District)
- Louie Lake (Sudbury District)
- Louie Lake (Haliburton County)
- Louies Lake
- Louis Lake (Pukatawagan Lake, Thunder Bay District)
- Louis Lake (Oboshkegan Township, Thunder Bay District)
- Lake Louisa
- Louisa Lake
- Louise Lake (Studholme Township, Cochrane District)
- Louise Lake (Grey County)
- Louise Lake (Bent Lake, Kenora District)
- Louise Lake (Cochrane)
- Louise Lake (Sudbury District)
- Louise Lake (Thunder Bay District)
- Louise Lake (Timiskaming District)
- Louise Lake (Pellatt Township, Kenora District)
- Loune Lake
- Lount Lake (English River, Kenora District)
- Lount Lake (Pettypiece Township, Kenora District)
- Louttit Lake
- Love Lake (Kenora District)
- Love Lake (Parry Sound District)
- Loveday Lake
- Lovedee Lake
- Loveland Lake (Kenora District)
- Loveland Lake (Cochrane District)
- Lovell Lake (Algoma District)
- Lovell Lake (Parry Sound District)
- Lovely Lake (Lascelles Township, Algoma District)
- Lovely Lake (Barnes Township, Algoma District)
- Loven Lake
- Lovering Lake
- Lovesick Lake

== Low–Lowb ==
- Low Bush Lake
- Low Lake (Killarney)
- Low Lake (Bayfield Township, Algoma District)
- Low Lake (Sarah Lake, Rainy River District)
- Low Lake (Cochrane District)
- Low Lake (Cavana Township, Sudbury District)
- Low Lake (Beauparlant Township, Algoma District)
- Low Lake (Kenora District)
- Low Lake (Marmion Lake, Rainy River District)
- Low Water Lake
- Low Wave Lake
- Lowbell Lake
- Lowbluff Lake

== Lowe–Lower I ==
- Lowe Lake
- Lowell Lake
- Lower Lake
- Lower Aitken Lake
- Lower Allumette Lake
- Lower Andrew Lake
- Lower Apsley Lake
- Lower Awada Lake
- Lower Bass Lake
- Lower Bawk Lake
- Lower Beverley Lake
- Lower Birch Lake
- Lower Bobcat Lake
- Lower Boleau Lake
- Lower Brooks Lake
- Lower Buckhorn Lake
- Lower Buckskin Lake
- Lower Cachege Lake
- Lower Cardiff Lake
- Lower Chesterfield Lake
- Lower Clearwater Lake
- Lower Courtney Lake
- Lower Cranberry Lake
- Lower Crane Lake
- Lower Crescent Lake
- Lower Deception Lake
- Lower Detour Lake
- Lower Dwyer Lake
- Lower Eagle Lake
- Lower Eastern Lake
- Lower Fish Lake
- Lower Fletcher Lake
- Lower Footprint Lake
- Lower Forks Lake
- Lower Fry Lake
- Lower Furlonge Lake
- Lower Galla Lake
- Lower Goodoar Lake
- Lower Green Lake
- Lower Griffin Lake
- Lower Hay Lake
- Lower Hewitt Lake
- Lower High Lake
- Lower Island Lake

== Lower J–Lower P ==
- Lower Jack Lake
- Lower Jay Lake
- Lower Kaogomok Lake
- Lower Kirkland Lake
- Lower Klondyke Lake
- Lower Leidtke Lake
- Lower Long Lake
- Lower Mace Lake
- Lower Manitou Lake
- Lower Matachewan Lake
- Lower Matagamasi Lake
- Lower Matthews Lake
- Lower Mazinaw Lake
- Lower McQuown Lake
- Lower Medhurst Lake
- Lower Medicine Lake
- Lower Merrick Lake
- Lower Michegama Lake
- Lower Minnipuka Lake
- Lower Minnow Lake
- Lower Monmouth Lake
- Lower Moosehide Lake
- Lower Mowat Lake
- Lower Mud Lake
- Lower Muldrew Lake
- Lower Murray Lake
- Lower Narrow Lake
- Lower Onaping Lake
- Lower Opikinimika Lake
- Lower Oshkegami Lake
- Lower Park Lake
- Lower Paudash Lake
- Lower Pawshowconk Lake
- Lower Pergeon Lake
- Lower Perieau Lake
- Lower Peterson Lake
- Lower Pine Lake
- Lower Pokei Lake
- Lower Pondlilies Lake
- Lower Prairie Bee Lake

== Lower Q–Lowery ==
- Lower Queenston Lake
- Lower Raft Lake
- Lower Raven Lake
- Lower Redwater Lake
- Lower Rideau Lake
- Lower Ridge Lake
- Lower Ritchie Lake
- Lower Rock Lake
- Lower Ross Lake
- Lower Sabrina Lake
- Lower Schufelt Lake
- Lower Scotch Lake
- Lower Serpent Lake
- Lower Shakwa Lake
- Lower Shebandowan Lake
- Lower Slate Lake
- Lower Spectacle Lake
- Lower Squirrel Lake
- Lower Stetham Lake
- Lower Stewart Lake
- Lower Sturgeon Lake
- Lower Trapper Lake
- Lower Turnbull Lake
- Lower Tweed Lake
- Lower Twin Lake (Kenora District)
- Lower Twin Lake (Muskoka District)
- Lower Twin Lake (Nipissing District)
- Lower Twin Lake (Timiskaming District)
- Lower Twin Lake (Cochrane District)
- Lower Twin Lake (Renfrew County)
- Lower Uncle Tom Lake
- Lower Wabakimi Lake
- Lower Walmsley Lake
- Lower Welch Lake
- Lower White Oak Lake
- Lower Wiggins Lake
- Lowery Lake (Kenora District)
- Lowery Lake (Nipissing District)

== Lowl–Lowr ==
- Lowland Lake
- Lown Lake
- Lownest Lake
- Lowney Lake
- Lowrie Lake
- Lowry Lake (Thunder Bay District)
- Lowry Lake (Rainy River District)
- Lowry Lake (Haliburton County)

== Lox–Loy ==
- Loxley Lake
- Loxton Lake
- Loyda Lake
- Loyst Lake

== Lua–Lul ==
- Luard Lake
- Lucas Lake
- Lucerne Lake
- Lucid Lake (Sudbury District)
- Lucid Lake (Hastings County)
- Lucienne Lake
- Lucier Lake
- Lucille Lake
- Luck Lake (Haliburton County)
- Luck Lake (Thunder Bay District)
- Luckasavitch Lake
- Luckless Lake
- Luckovitch Lake
- Lucky Lake (Frontenac County)
- Lucky Lake (Algoma District)
- Lucky Lake (Thunder Bay District)
- Lucky Lake (Bruce County)
- Lucky Lake (Cochrane District)
- Luckyshoe Lake
- Lucy Lake (Thunder Bay District)
- Lucy Lake (Algoma District)
- Lucy Lake (Haliburton County)
- Ludgate Lake
- Ludlow Lake
- Ludy Lake
- Lue Lake (Sudbury District)
- Lue Lake (Algoma District)
- Luella Lake
- Luhta Lake
- Luk Lake
- Luke Lake (Hutt Township, Sudbury District)
- Luke Lake (Haliburton County)
- Luke Lake (Thunder Bay District)
- Luke Lake (Eden Township, Sudbury District)
- Lukeberry Lake
- Lukeward Lake
- Lukinto Lake
- Lula Lake
- Lull Lake
- Lake Lulu
- Lulu Lake (Nipissing District)
- Lulu Lake (Sudbury District)
- Lulu Lake (Cochrane District)
- Lulu Lake (Timiskaming District)
- Lulum Lake

== Lum–Lut ==
- Lum Lake
- Lumber Lake (Haliburton County)
- Lumber Lake (Kenora District)
- Lumby Lake
- Lumsden Lake (Kenora District)
- Lumsden Lake (Manitoulin District)
- Luna Lake
- Lunam Lake (Totem Lake, Thunder Bay District)
- Lunam Lake (Pic River, Thunder Bay District)
- Lunam Lake (Pic Township, Thunder Bay District)
- Lunan Lake
- Lunch Lake (South Algonquin)
- Lunch Lake (Bryant Township, Thunder Bay District)
- Lunch Lake (Syne Township, Thunder Bay District)
- Lunch Lake (Olrig Township, Nipissing District)
- Lunch Lake (Sioux Narrows-Nestor Falls)
- Lunch Lake (Lunch Creek, Thunder Bay District)
- Lunch Lake (Algoma District)
- Lunch Lake (Jackman Township, Kenora District)
- Lund Lake (Algoma District)
- Lund Lake (Kenora District)
- Lundberg Lake
- Lundmark Lake
- Lundy Lake (Timiskaming District)
- Lundy Lake (Nipissing District)
- Lunkie Lake
- Lunnen Lake
- Lunny Lake
- Lupus Lake (Nipissing District)
- Lupus Lake (Sudbury District)
- Luquer Lake
- Luraas Lake
- Lurch Lake
- Lusk Lake
- Lusty Lake
- Lutes Lake
- Luther Lake (Kenora District)
- Luther Lake (Wellington County)
- Lutra Lake

== Ly ==
- Lychnis Lake
- Lydia Lake
- Lydon Lake
- Lyds Lake
- Lye Lake
- Lyell Long Lake
- Lyla Lake
- Lyman Lake (Sudbury District)
- Lyman Lake (Lennox and Addington County)
- Lymburner Lake
- Lynam Lake
- Lyncean Lake
- Lynch Lake (Thunder Bay District)
- Lynch Lake (Muskoka District)
- Lynch Lake (Frontenac County)
- Lynch Lake (Parry Sound District)
- Lynch Lake (Algoma District)
- Lynchs Lake
- Lyndhurst Lake
- Lyne Lake
- Lynn Lake (Sudbury District)
- Lynn Lake (Nipissing District)
- Lynn Lake (Frontenac County)
- Lynx Lake (Cochrane District)
- Lynx Lake (Kenora District)
- Lynx Lake (Nipissing District)
- Lynx Lake (Rainy River District)
- Lynx Lake (Muskoka District)
- Lynx Lake (Timiskaming District)
- Lynxpaw Lake
- Lynx Tail Lake
- Lyon Lake
- Lyons Lake (Thunder Bay District)
- Lyons Lake (Cochrane District)
- Lyons Lake (Frontenac County)
- Lyre Lake
- Lysander Lake
