= Harcourt Park =

Canadian nonprofit cottaging corporation

Coordinates: 45°06′N 78°12′W

Harcourt Park is a nonprofit cottaging corporation established in 1959 by the Sumcot Development Corporation in the Municipality of Dysart et al, Haliburton County in Central Ontario, Canada.

== Geography ==
Harcourt Park is located in Harcourt Township near the small community of Harcourt, Ontario in Haliburton County. The park is approximately 240 kilometres (150 mi) northeast of Toronto and approximately 250 kilometres (160 mi) west of Ottawa. It has 6,900 acres (2,800 ha) of land, 18 lakes, and 600 surveyed properties that are individually leased in favor of private ownership. The Town of Bancroft is the closest community nearby, with a population exceeding 1,000.

== Ownership ==
Ownership of property within the park is titled to Harcourt Park Inc., and is subject to private lease, granting a membership in the corporation, a single vote, and the eligibility to become a member on the volunteer Board of Directors in charge of managing the corporation's business. Annual lease fees are used to provide services within the park, including road maintenance, fish stocking, community events, and security. Only eight lakes in the park have cottages, and of them, only four permit motorized watercraft: Straggle Lake, Little Straggle Lake, Allen Lake, and Kennaway Lake. Personal watercraft such as jet-skis and Sea-Doos are prohibited.

== Recreation ==
The Harcourt Park Marina, located on Little Straggle Lake, serves as a local grocery store, hardware store, and marine mechanic. Nearby, the Harcourt Park Community Center offers recreation. A network of over 50 kilometres (31 mi) worth of trails extends through Harcourt Park, including the northern terminating end of the Ontario Federation of Snowmobile Clubs’ "E" Trail.

== Natural history ==
Harcourt Park is situated on the height of land between the two drainage basins: spring and rainwater alone feed into its lakes, which empty into either the Trent River or the Madawaska River systems. Due to extensive logging of the region in the early portion of the twentieth century, the majority of Harcourt Park's interior is made up of new-growth maple, along with a scattering of fir, hemlock, cedar, and birch. Wildlife within the park is extensive and diverse because of its proximity to Algonquin Provincial Park and its relative isolation, and includes black bears, moose, white-tailed deer, coyotes, otters, beavers, and a number of other smaller mammals, birds, insects, and reptiles. A variety of fish are found within the park's various lakes, including smallmouth bass, largemouth bass, rock bass, lake trout, and rainbow trout. Harcourt Park is protected from further cottage development and owns all logging rights on the property.
