= Kennaway =

Kennaway may refer to:

== Places ==
- Kennaway, Ontario, a dispersed rural community in the municipality of Dysart et al., Ontario, Canada
- Kennaway Lake, a lake just south of the above community
- Kennaway House, Sidmouth, East Devon, Great Britain

== People with the name ==
- Kennaway (surname)
- Kennaway baronets, a title in the Baronetage of Great Britain in Hyderabad, East Indies
- Kennaway Henderson (1879–1960), New Zealand clerk, illustrator, cartoonist, editor and pacifist

== See also ==
- Kennoway, a village in Fife, Scotland
