= Fishtail Lake (Ontario) =

- lac Fishtail
- Location in Southern Ontario
- Location: Haliburton County, Ontario
- Coordinates: 45°08′37″N 78°11′52″W
- Type: lake
- Part of: Ottawa River drainage basin
- Primary inflows: Allen Creek
- Primary outflows: Allen Creek
- Basin countries: Canada
- Max. length: 3.7 kilometres (2.3 mi)
- Max. width: 1.3 kilometres (0.81 mi)
- Surface area: 252.32 hectares (623.5 acres)
- Surface elevation: 392 metres (1,286 ft)

Fishtail Lake (French: lac Fishtail) is a lake in the municipality of Dysart et al, Haliburton County in Central Ontario, Canada. It is on Allen Creek and is in the Ottawa River drainage basin.

== Geography ==
Fishtail Lake has an area of 252.32 hectares (623.5 acres) and lies at an elevation of 392 metres (1,286 ft). It is 3.7 kilometres (2.3 mi) long and 1.3 kilometres (0.81 mi) wide. From the air the lake looks like a fish, with its head facing west and its upraised tail facing northeast. The nearest named community is Kennaway, 1.5 kilometres (0.93 mi) to the east.

The primary inflow is Allen Creek, arriving at the west from the direction of Allen Lake. There are five unnamed secondary inflows: one at the south; two at the northeast, including one arriving from Luke Lake; one at the north; and one at the northwest. The primary outflow, at the northeast end of the lake, is also Allen Creek, which flows via Benoir Lake, the York River and the Madawaska River to the Ottawa River.
