= Steenburg Lake =

Lake in Hastings County, Ontario, Canada

- Location within Ontario
- Location: Limerick, Hastings County, Ontario
- Coordinates: 44°49′32″N 77°40′52″W
- Primary inflows: Mud Creek
- Primary outflows: Bass Creek
- Basin countries: Canada
- Max. length: 3.2 km (2.0 mi)
- Max. width: 2.8 km (1.7 mi)
- Surface elevation: 316 m (1,037 ft)
- Settlements: Steenburg Lake

Steenburg Lake is a lake in the Trent River and Lake Ontario drainage basins in the township of Limerick, Hastings County, Ontario, Canada, about 1.1 kilometres (0.7 mi) west of Ontario Highway 62 and 28 kilometres (17 mi) south of the town of Bancroft.

== Hydrology ==
The lake is about 3.2 kilometres (2.0 mi) long and 2.8 kilometres (1.7 mi) wide and lies at an elevation of 316 metres (1,037 ft). It has six named islands: Crab Island, Dewey's Island, Picket Island, Bateman's Island, Uncle Bob's Island and Powers Island; and two named bays: Adam's Bay and Austin's Bay. Sunset Point from the east and The Headland from the west jut into the middle of the lake.

There are six inflows. Mud Creek from Paddy's Lake at the southwest is the only named one. The other five unnamed creek inflows are: two at the northwest, one at the north, one at the northeast and one at the east. The primary outflow is Bass Creek to Limerick Lake, which flows via Beaver Creek, the Crowe River and the Trent River to the Bay of Quinte on Lake Ontario at Trenton.

== Settlements ==
Steenburg Lake is on the northwest bay.

== See also ==
- List of lakes in Ontario
