= Limerick Township =

Limerick Township may refer to:

- Limerick Township, Ontario
- Limerick Township, Montgomery County, Pennsylvania
