= Paddy's Lake =

Lake in Hastings County, Ontario, Canada

Paddy's Lake Lake
- Location within Ontario
- Location: Limerick, Hastings County, Ontario
- Coordinates: 44°48′34″N 77°42′05″W
- Primary inflows: Mud Creek, unnamed creek
- Primary outflows: Mud Creek
- Basin countries: Canada
- Max. length: 740 m (2,428 ft)
- Max. width: 520 m (1,706 ft)
- Surface elevation: 318 m (1,043 ft)

Paddy's Lake is a lake in the Trent River and Lake Ontario drainage basins in the township of Limerick, Hastings County, Ontario, Canada, about 1.4 kilometres (0.9 mi) southeast of the community Murphy Corners, 5.2 kilometres (3.2 mi) west of Ontario Highway 62 and 30 kilometres (19 mi) south of the town of Bancroft.

== Hydrology ==
The lake is about 740 metres (2,428 ft) long and 520 metres (1,706 ft) and lies at an elevation of 318 metres (1,043 ft). The primary inflow, at the southwest is Mud Creek, and there is an unnamed creek inflow at the south. The primary outflow, at the east, is also Mud Creek, which flows to Steenburg Lake, and then via Bass Creek, Beaver Creek, the Crowe River and the Trent River to the Bay of Quinte on Lake Ontario at Trenton.

== See also ==
- List of lakes in Ontario
