= Harcourt Park (disambiguation) =

Harcourt Park may refer to:

- Harcourt Park - A cottaging enclave in Canada.
- Harcourt Park - The real-life setting for Isengard in The Lord of the Rings: The Fellowship of the Ring (2001).
- Harcourt Garden, Hong Kong, also known as Harcourt Park
