= Luke Lake (Haliburton County) =

- lac Luke
- Location in Southern Ontario
- Location: Haliburton County, Ontario
- Coordinates: 45°09′38″N 78°11′59″W
- Type: lake
- Part of: Ottawa River drainage basin
- Primary outflows: unnamed stream to Fishtail Lake
- Basin countries: Canada
- Max. length: 490 metres (1,610 ft)
- Max. width: 410 metres (1,350 ft)
- Surface area: 12.64 hectares (31.2 acres)
- Surface elevation: 421 metres (1,381 ft)

Luke Lake (French: lac Luke) is a small lake in the municipality of Dysart et al, Haliburton County in Central Ontario, Canada. It is in the Ottawa River drainage basin.

== Geography ==
Luke Lake has an area of 12.64 hectares (31.2 acres) and lies at an elevation of 421 metres (1,381 ft). It is 490 metres (1,610 ft) long and 410 metres (1,350 ft) wide. The nearest named community is Kennaway, 2.5 kilometres (1.6 mi) to the east.

The primary inflow is an unnamed creek, arriving at the northwest. The primary outflow, at the southeast end of the lake, is an unnamed creek that flows to Fishtail Lake. Fishtail Lake flows via Allen Creek, Benoir Lake, the York River and the Madawaska River to the Ottawa River.
