= Straggle Lake =

Lake in Ontario, Canada

Big Straggle Lake
- lac Straggle
- Location in Southern Ontario
- Location: Haliburton County, Ontario
- Coordinates: 45°07′04″N 78°11′45″W
- Type: lake
- Part of: Ottawa River drainage basin
- Primary inflows: Straggle Creek
- Primary outflows: Straggle Creek
- Basin countries: Canada
- Surface area: 96.5 hectares (238 acres)
- Surface elevation: 411 metres (1,348 ft)

Big Straggle Lake (French: lac Straggle) is a lake in the municipality of Dysart et al, Haliburton County in Central Ontario, Canada. It lies at an elevation of 411 metres (1,348 ft), has an area of 96.5 hectares (238 acres), and is in the Ottawa River drainage basin.

The primary inflow, at the southwest, is Straggle Creek. There are also two unnamed secondary inflows, at the south and northeast. The primary outflow, at the northwest, is also Straggle Creek, which heads first to Little Straggle Lake, and then via Allen Creek, the York River and the Madawaska River to the Ottawa River.
