= Straggle Creek =

Stream in Ontario, Canada

Straggle Creek ruisseau Straggle
- Location of the mouth of Straggle Creek in Southern Ontario

Location
- Country: Canada
- Province: Ontario
- Region: Central Ontario
- County: Haliburton County
- Municipalities: Dysart et al

Physical characteristics
- Source: unnamed lake
  - coordinates: 45°06′42″N 78°12′11″W
  - elevation: 423 metres (1,388 ft)
- Mouth: Allen Creek
  - coordinates: 45°08′14″N 78°13′54″W
  - elevation: 392 metres (1,286 ft)

Basin features
- River system: Ottawa River drainage basin

Straggle Creek (French: ruisseau Straggle) is a stream in the municipality of Dysart et al, Haliburton County in Central Ontario, Canada. It is a right tributary of Allen Creek and is in the Ottawa River drainage basin.

== Course ==
Straggle Creek begins at an unnamed lake at an elevation of 423 metres (1,388 ft), at the height of land between the Ottawa River drainage basin to the north and east, and the Trent River drainage basin to the west and south. It flows north to the southwest end of Straggle Lake, then continues north from the northwest end of the lake to the south end of Little Straggle Lake. The creek leaves Little Straggle Lake at the northwest heading west, then gradually curves north, and reaches its mouth at Allen Creek at an elevation of 392 metres (1,286 ft). Allen Creek flows via Benoir Lake, the York River, and the Madawaska River to the Ottawa River.
