= Limerick Lake =

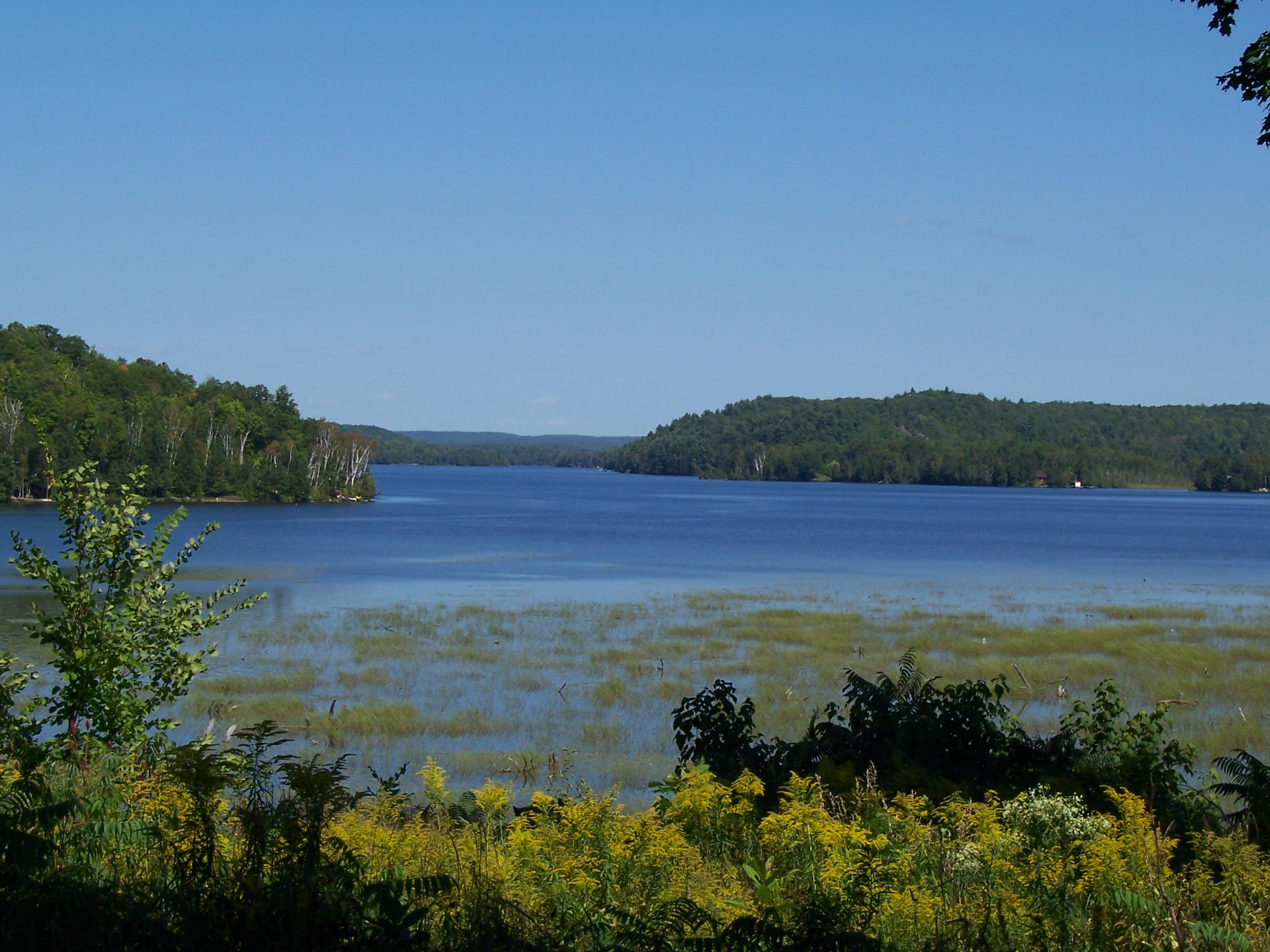

- Location within Ontario
- Location: Limerick, Hastings County, Ontario
- Coordinates: 44°53′34″N 77°37′02″W
- Lake type: natural, reservoir
- Primary inflows: Bass Creek, Dixon Creek
- Primary outflows: Beaver Creek
- Basin countries: Canada
- Max. length: 7.1 km (4.4 mi)
- Max. width: 2.2 km (1.4 mi)
- Surface area: 8.3 km^{2} (3.2 sq mi)
- Average depth: 10 m (33 ft)
- Max. depth: 35 m (115 ft)
- Surface elevation: 313 m (1,027 ft)
- Settlements: Martins Landing

Limerick Lake is a lake in the Trent River and Lake Ontario drainage basins in the township of Limerick, Hastings County, Ontario, Canada, about 3 kilometres (1.9 mi) northwest of the community of St. Ola, 2.5 kilometres (1.6 mi) northeast of Highway 62, and 25 kilometres (16 mi) southeast of the town of Bancroft. In 1934, the building of St. Ola Dam raised the level of Big Salmon Lake by two metres. The lake was then renamed, as part of a process in Ontario to give each large lake a unique name. The original concrete dam (consisting of the dam + a sluiceway with timber logs, plus overflow weirs) was assessed in 2002 and significant cracking was found. The dam was replaced in 2004 with a new concrete dam. The waterway falls under the jurisdiction of the Crowe Valley Conservation Authority which has responsibility for furthering the conservation, development, and management of natural resources, but whose main activity is flood control. The lake is designated a cold water lake trout spawning lake.

== Hydrology ==
The lake is about 7.1 kilometres (4.4 mi) long and 2.2 kilometres (1.4 mi) wide with an area of 8.3 square kilometres (3.2 sq mi) and lies at an elevation of 313 metres (1,027 ft). The average depth is 10 metres (33 ft) and the maximum depth 35 metres (115 ft). Caverly's Bay is on the west of the southwest end of the lake. The primary inflows are Dixon Creek from Dark Lake at the northeast and Bass Creek from Steenburg Lake at the southwest. There are also four unnamed creek inflows: one at the west, one at the northwest, and two at the east. The primary outflow is a channel to St. Ola Lake, which flows via Beaver Creek, the Crowe River and the Trent River to the Bay of Quinte on Lake Ontario at Trenton.

== Settlements ==
The majority of the lake shore is accessible by boat only. Limerick Lake has just one full-year resident, although with 154 seasonal residences occupied mainly in the seasonal months from June to September. The named settlement Martins Landing is on the southwest shore, but is more commonly called Limerick Lake Lodge and Marina. The lodge acts as a main entry point to the lake (along with the marina at Woods Camp Ground on St. Ola Lake and the public launch ramp at the dam). Currently development and sub division of lots on the lake is restricted, with a controversial backlot development proceeding that has been fought over for at least 15 years in the Ontario Municipal Board.

== Ecology ==
The area and shoreline are heavily forested and abundant with deer, bear, small game, and moose. The lake contains several species of fish: Largemouth bass, Smallmouth bass, Yellow perch, Rock bass, Lake trout, and Pumpkinseed. The wild rice wetland in front of the marina hosts large rafts of migrating loons in the fall and spring. Each bay of the lake generally hosts a nesting loon family through the summer.

== Recreation ==
Limerick Lake is typically frozen over from late November to late April and supports several winter activities such as snowmobiling, cross country skiing, dogsledding, and snowshoe hiking. It is a popular destination for fishermen and hunters.

== See also ==
- List of lakes in Ontario
