= Little Papineau Lake =

Lake in Hastings Highlands, Ontario, Canada

Coordinates: 45°20′04.4″N 77°52′12.0″W

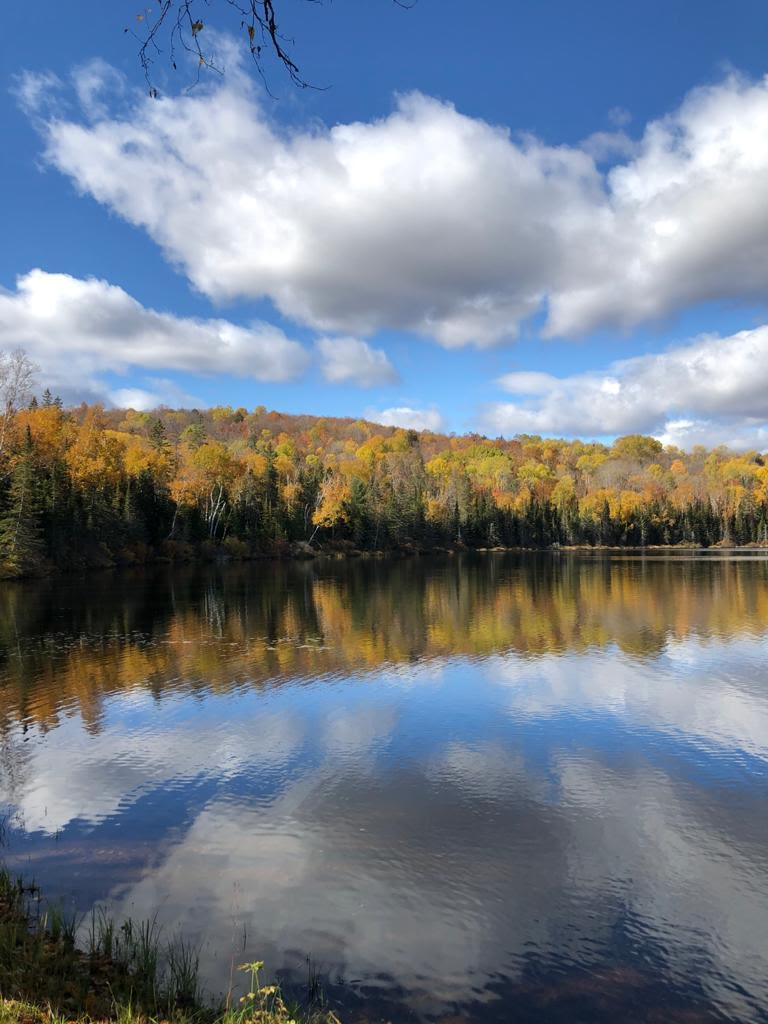
View of the southern part of Little Papineau Lake

Little Papineau Lake is a lake in Hastings Highlands, Ontario. The lake lies approximately 329m above sea level and is 83 hectares in size with a maximum depth of 17m. Smallmouth bass, largemouth bass, yellow perch, pumpkinseed sunfish, white sucker and northern pike can be found in the lake and brook trout can be found in the creek feeding the lake. The lake is 80% Crown land and offers a public boat launch. Little Papineau Lake is 170 km west of Ottawa and 1 km from Papineau Lake. There are deer, moose, herons and raptors that live on or near the lake.

The north eastern part of the lake is a forest research area and on the south western part of the lake clear cutting and selection cutting was planned for 2020-2021

The shoreline around the entire lake is an archaeological potential area.

The lake is fed by Hawk Creek and Little Papineau Creek in the north and empties in the south through Little Papineau Creek which leads to Papineau Lake. The lake is considered a warm water lake.

The properties around the lake are a mix of waterfront residential, limited service residential and limited service residential island and environmental protection areas.

The forest around the lake is predominantly mixed coniferous forest. The area surrounding the lake is sparsely populated with only 6 residents per square kilometer.

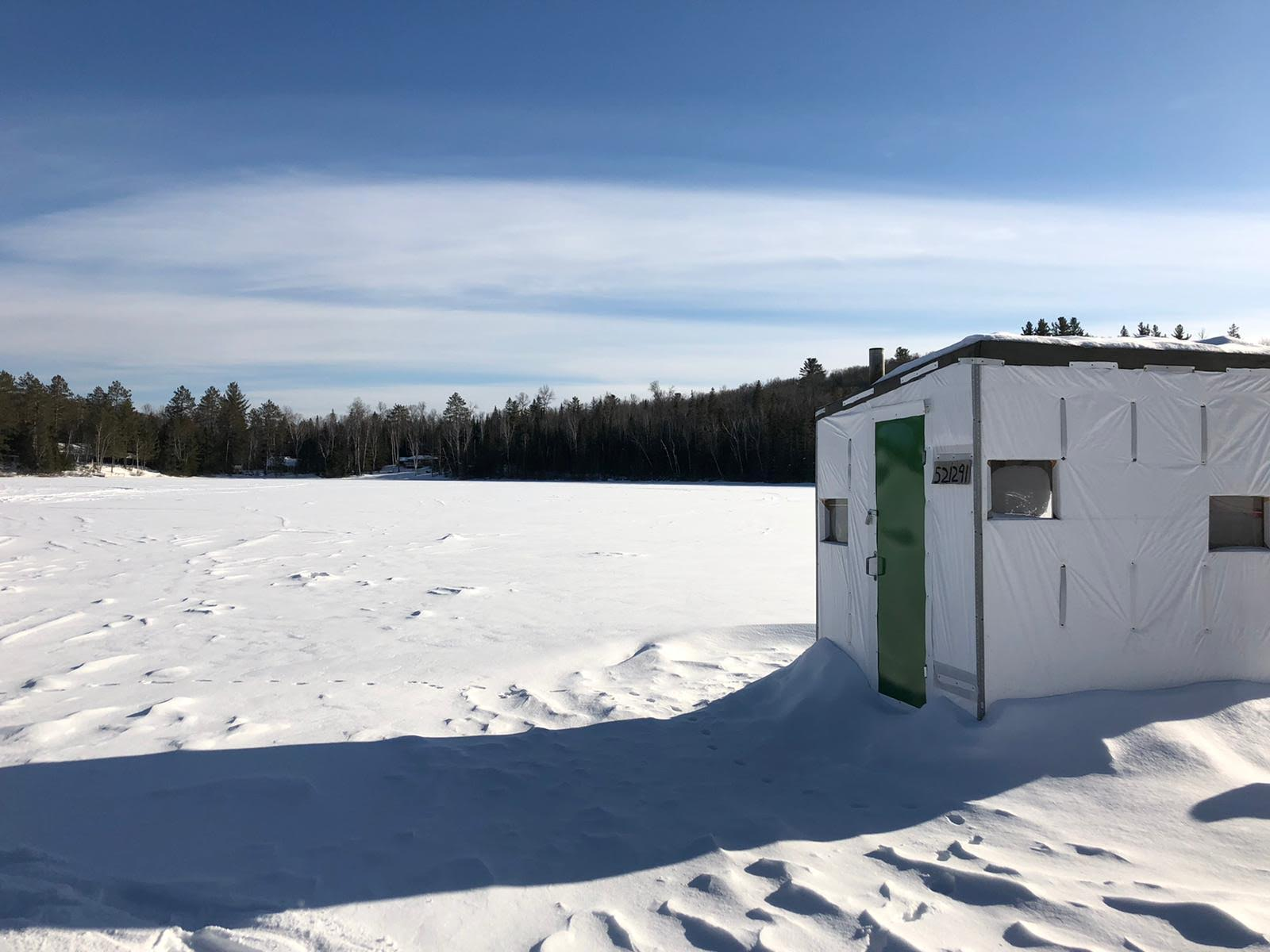
Ice fishing hut on Little Papineau Lake
