= Kennaway (surname) =

Kennaway is a surname, and may refer to:

- Adrienne Kennaway (born 1945), New Zealand illustrator and writer of children's picture books
- Ernest Kennaway (1881–1958), British pathologist
- Guy Kennaway, English writer
- James Kennaway (1928–1968), Scottish novelist and screenwriter
- Joe Kennaway (1905–1969), Canadian and Scottish football goalkeeper
- Sir John Kennaway, 1st Baronet (1758–1836), British soldier and diplomat
- Sir John Kennaway, 3rd Baronet (1837–1919), British politician
- Walter Kennaway (1835–1920), New Zealand provincial politician and run-holder in Canterbury
