= Little Straggle Lake =

- petit lac Straggle
- Location in Southern Ontario
- Location: Haliburton County, Ontario
- Coordinates: 45°07′32″N 78°12′07″W
- Type: lake
- Part of: Ottawa River drainage basin
- Primary inflows: Straggle Creek
- Primary outflows: Straggle Creek
- Basin countries: Canada
- Surface area: 38.3 hectares (95 acres)
- Surface elevation: 411 metres (1,348 ft)

Little Straggle Lake (French: petit lac Straggle) is a lake in the municipality of Dysart et al, Haliburton County in Central Ontario, Canada. It lies at an elevation of 411 metres (1,348 ft), has an area of 38.3 hectares (95 acres), and is in the Ottawa River drainage basin.

The primary inflow, at the south and arriving from Straggle Lake, and outflow, at the northwest, is Straggle Creek, which flows via Allen Creek, the York River and the Madawaska River to the Ottawa River.
