= St. Ola, Ontario =

St. Ola
- dispersed rural community
- Etymology: from the parish of St. Olaf in Kirkwall, Orkney Islands
- Location in Southern Ontario
- Coordinates: 44°51′19″N 77°36′14″W
- Country: Canada
- Province: Ontario
- Region: Central Ontario
- County: Hastings County
- Township municipality: Limerick
- Elevation: 308 m (1,010 ft)
- Time zone: UTC-5 (Eastern Time Zone)
  - Summer (DST): UTC-4 (Eastern Time Zone)
- Area code: 613, 343

St. Ola is a dispersed rural community in the township municipality of Limerick, Hastings County in Central Ontario, Canada. It takes its name from the parish of St. Olaf in Kirkwall, Orkney Islands, and is now largely unoccupied.

At one time there was a Methodist church and a post office.
