= Allen Lake (Haliburton County) =

- lac Allen
- Location in Southern Ontario
- Location: Haliburton County, Ontario
- Coordinates: 45°07′07″N 78°15′14″W
- Type: lake
- Part of: Ottawa River drainage basin
- Primary inflows: Allen Creek
- Primary outflows: Allen Creek
- Basin countries: Canada
- Max. length: 1,920 metres (6,300 ft)
- Max. width: 880 metres (2,890 ft)
- Surface area: 96.96 hectares (239.6 acres)
- Surface elevation: 431 metres (1,414 ft)

Allen Lake (French: lac Allen) is a lake in the municipality of Dysart et al, Haliburton County in Central Ontario, Canada. It is on Allen Creek and is in the Ottawa River drainage basin.

== Geography ==
Allen Lake has an area of 96.96 hectares (239.6 acres) and lies at an elevation of 431 metres (1,414 ft). It is 1,920 metres (6,300 ft) long and 880 metres (2,890 ft) wide. The lake is at the height of land between the Ottawa River drainage basin to the north and east, and the Trent River drainage basin to the west and southwest. The nearest named community is Pusey, 6.5 kilometres (4.0 mi) to the south just over the border into the neighbouring municipality of Highlands East.

The primary inflow is Allen Creek, arriving at the south from the direction of Little Allen Lake. There is one unnamed secondary inflow in the southwest. The primary outflow, at the northern end of the lake, is also Allen Creek, which flows via Benoir Lake, the York River and the Madawaska River to the Ottawa River.
