= Kennaway Lake =

- lac Kennaway
- Location in Southern Ontario
- Location: Haliburton County, Ontario
- Coordinates: 45°08′16″N 78°10′30″W
- Type: lake
- Part of: Ottawa River drainage basin
- Primary outflows: unnamed stream to Allen Creek
- Basin countries: Canada
- Max. length: 1,470 metres (4,820 ft)
- Max. width: 430 metres (1,410 ft)
- Surface area: 33.89 hectares (83.7 acres)
- Surface elevation: 433 metres (1,421 ft)

Kennaway Lake (French: lac Kennaway) is a small lake in the municipality of Dysart et al, Haliburton County in Central Ontario, Canada. It is in the Ottawa River drainage basin.

== Geography ==
Kennaway Lake has an area of 33.89 hectares (83.7 acres) and lies at an elevation of 433 metres (1,421 ft). It is 1,470 metres (4,820 ft) long and 430 metres (1,410 ft) wide. The nearest named community is Kennaway, 1.9 kilometres (1.2 mi) to the north.

There are no inflows. The primary outflow, at the northeast end of the lake, is an unnamed creek that flows as a right tributary to Allen Creek. Allen Creek flows via Benoir Lake, the York River and the Madawaska River to the Ottawa River.
