= Loch Lomond (Algoma District) =

Lake in Ontario, Canada

- Location in Ontario
- Location: Algoma District, Ontario
- Coordinates: 48°22′15″N 84°11′43″W
- Etymology: Named after Loch Lomond
- Part of: Great Lakes Basin
- Primary inflows: Lochalsh River
- Primary outflows: Lochalsh River
- Max. length: 3.2 kilometres (2.0 mi)
- Max. width: 0.7 kilometres (0.43 mi)
- Surface elevation: 339 metres (1,112 ft)

Loch Lomond is a lake in geographic Glasgow Township in the Unorganized North Part of Algoma District in Northeastern, Ontario, Canada. It is in the Great Lakes Basin and lies within the Chapleau Crown Game Preserve.

The primary inflow is the Lochalsh River arriving from Glasgow Lake at the west. The primary outflow, at the east, is also the Lochalsh River, which flows to Dog Lake and then via the Dog River, the Michipicoten River, and the Magpie River to Lake Superior.

== See also ==
- List of lakes in Ontario
