= Little Allen Lake =

Lake in Haliburton County, Ontario, Canada

- petit lac Allen
- Location in Southern Ontario
- Location: Haliburton County, Ontario
- Coordinates: 45°06′14″N 78°14′25″W
- Type: lake
- Part of: Ottawa River drainage basin
- Primary outflows: Allen Creek
- Basin countries: Canada
- Max. length: 650 metres (2,130 ft)
- Max. width: 520 metres (1,710 ft)
- Surface area: 12.60 hectares (31.1 acres)
- Surface elevation: 450 metres (1,480 ft)

Little Allen Lake (French: petit lac Allen) is a lake in the municipality of Dysart et al, Haliburton County in Central Ontario, Canada. It is the source of Allen Creek and is in the Ottawa River drainage basin.

== Geography ==
Little Allan Lake has an area of 12.60 hectares (31.1 acres) and lies at an elevation of 450 metres (1,480 ft). It is 650 metres (2,130 ft) long and 520 metres (1,710 ft) wide. The lake is at the height of land between the Ottawa River drainage basin to the north and east, and the Trent River drainage basin to the west and south. The nearest named community is Pusey, 5 kilometres (3.1 mi) to the south and just over the border into the neighbouring municipality of Highlands East.

The lake has no inflows. The primary outflow, at the northern end of the lake, is Allen Creek, which flows via Benoir Lake, the York River and the Madawaska River to the Ottawa River.
