= Limerick, Ontario =

Limerick
- Township (lower-tier)
- Township of Limerick
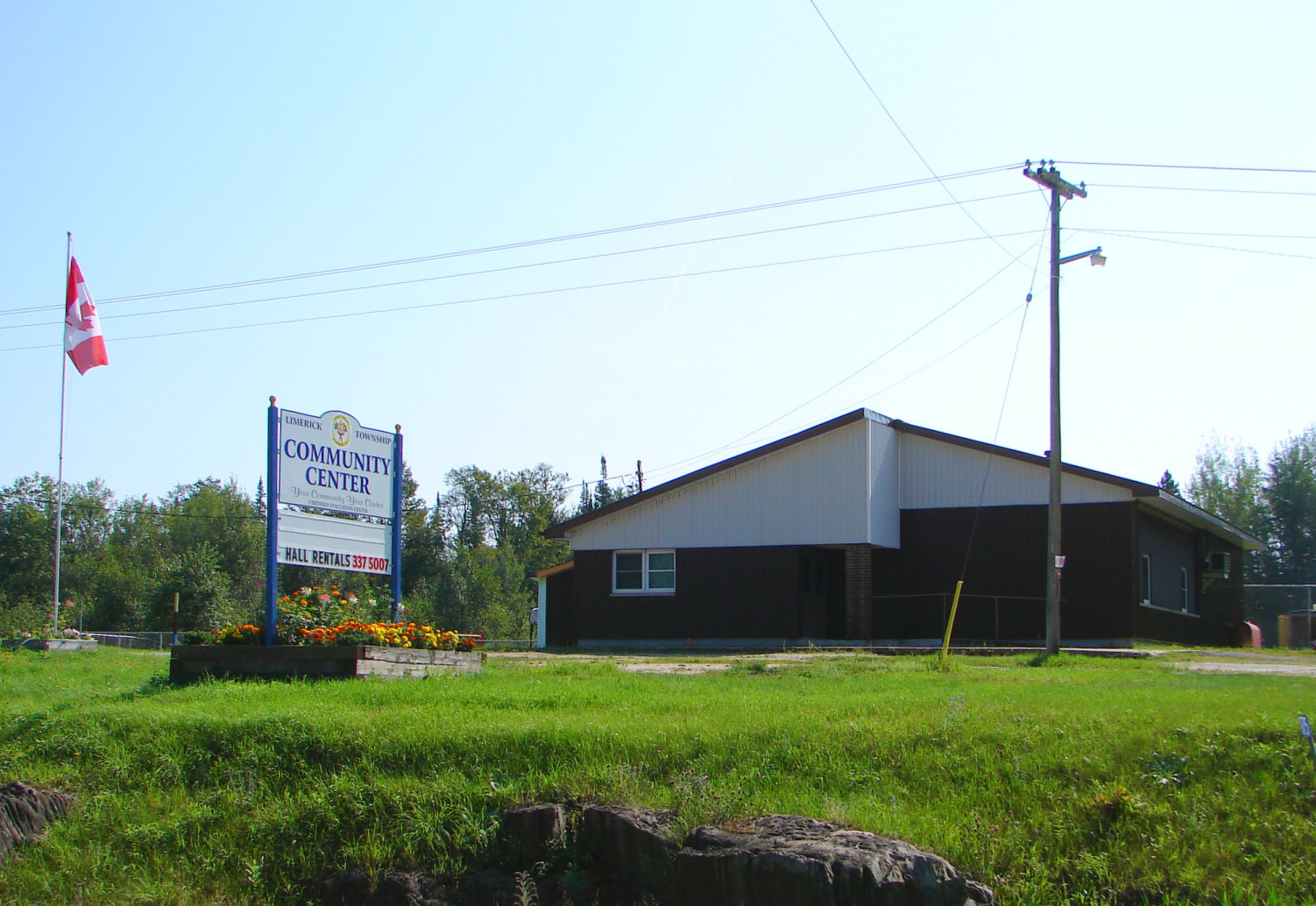
- Community centre

- Location within Southern Ontario
- Coordinates: 44°54′N 77°40′W
- Country: Canada
- Province: Ontario
- County: Hastings
- Incorporated: 1887

Government
  - Type: Township
  - Mayor: Kim Carson
  - Fed. riding: Hastings—Lennox and Addington
  - Prov. riding: Hastings—Lennox and Addington

Area
  - Land: 201.04 km^{2} (77.62 sq mi)

Population (2021)
  - Total: 436
  - Density: 2.2/km^{2} (5.7/sq mi)
- Time zone: UTC-5 (EST)
  - Summer (DST): UTC-4 (EDT)
- Postal Code: K0L
- Area codes: 613 and 343
- Website: www.township.limerick.on.ca

Limerick is a small township in Hastings County, Ontario, Canada, near Limerick Lake. It is located 80 kilometres (50 mi) north of Belleville between Madoc and Bancroft and served by Ontario Highway 62 and Township Road 620. The Township is bordered by the Town of Bancroft, Township of Wollaston and the United Townships of Tudor and Cashel. The township is heavily forested, as is the shoreline of the Limerick Lake, the main industry in the township being forestry and logging. The population of Limerick Township is approx. 400 full-year residents, and another 1000 seasonal residents.

It was named in 1887 after the city of Limerick in Ireland.

== Communities ==
The township of Limerick comprises a number of villages and hamlets, including the following communities:

- Brinklow
- Martins Landing
- Ormsby (44.881°N 77.749°W)
- Ormsby Junction
- St. Ola
- Steenburg Lake
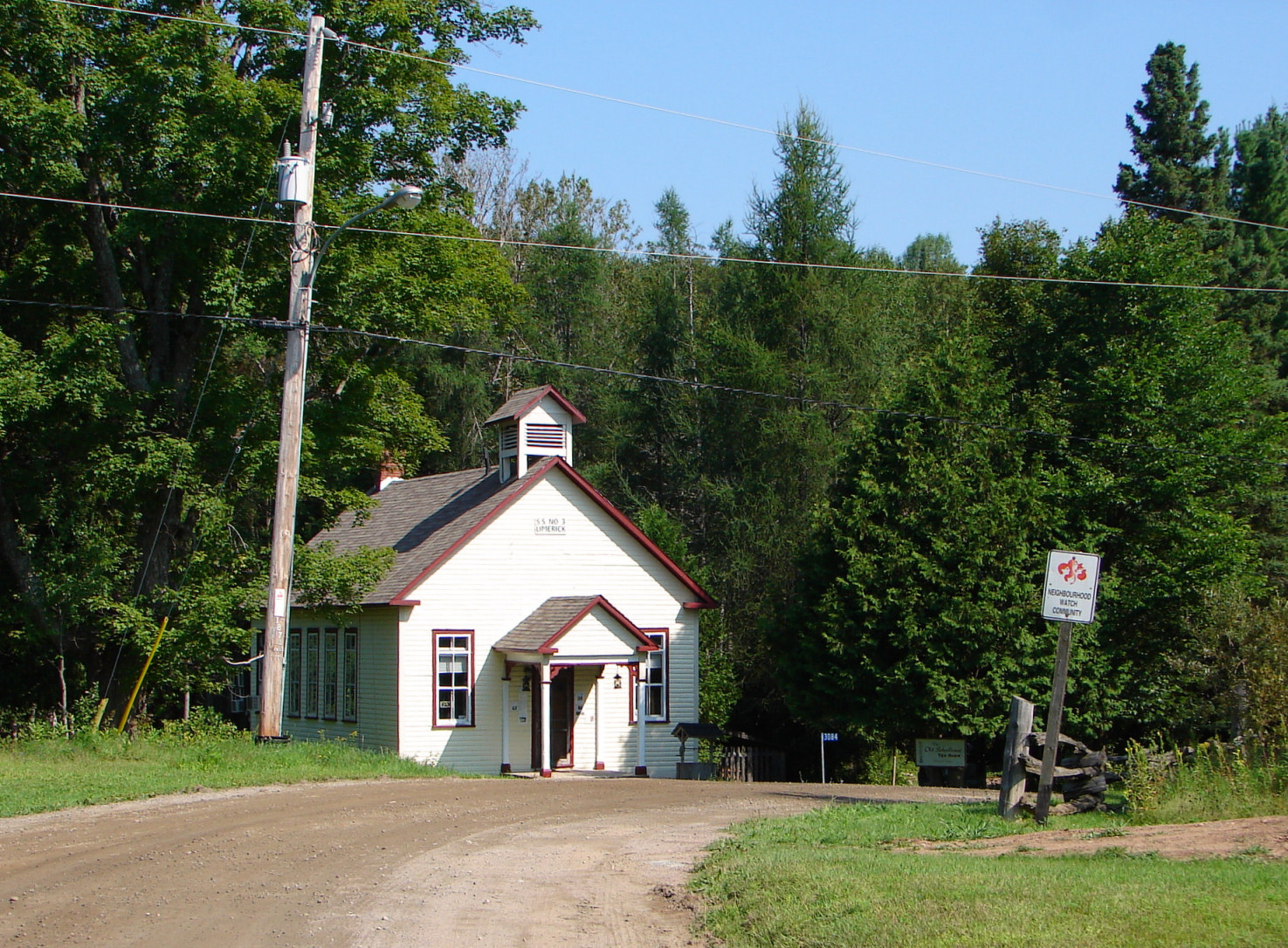
Old school house in Ormsby

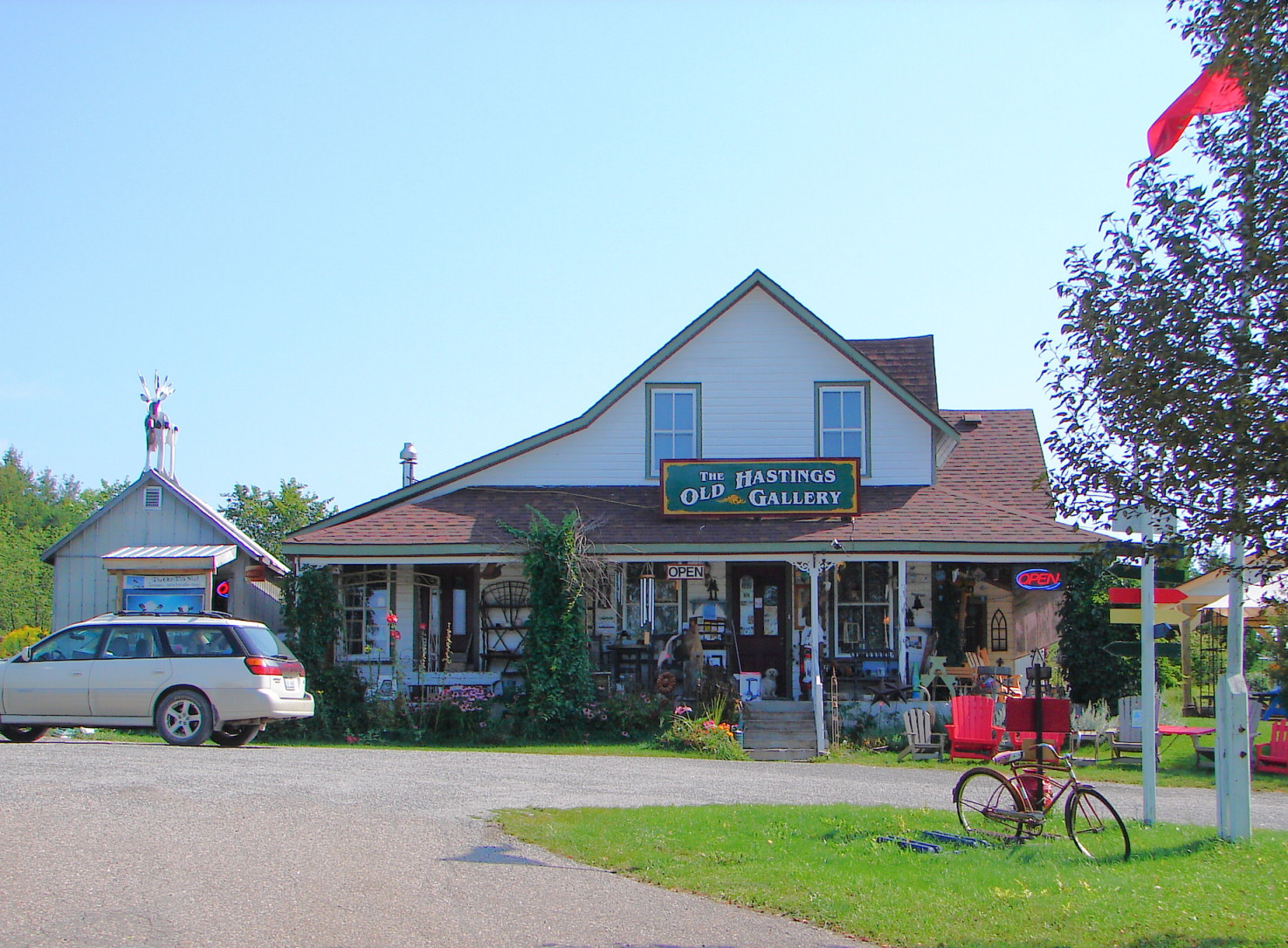
Country store in Ormsby

== Demographics ==
In the 2021 Census of Population conducted by Statistics Canada, Limerick had a population of 436 living in 206 of its 533 total private dwellings, a change of 26% from its 2016 population of 346. With a land area of 201.04 km^{2} (77.62 sq mi), it had a population density of 2.2/km^{2} (5.6/sq mi) in 2021.

Canada census – Limerick community profile

	2021	2016	2011
Population	436 (+26.0% from 2016)	346 (-1.7% from 2011)	352 (-3.3% from 2006)
Land area	201.04 km^{2} (77.62 sq mi)	205.37 km^{2} (79.29 sq mi)	205.68 km^{2} (79.41 sq mi)
Population density	2.2/km^{2} (5.7/sq mi)	1.7/km^{2} (4.4/sq mi)	1.7/km^{2} (4.4/sq mi)
Median age	60.0 (M: 61.2, F: 58.4)	55.1 (M: 55.7, F: 53.8)	52.7 (M: 54.8, F: 51.7)
Private dwellings	533 (total) 206 (occupied)	541 (total)	427 (total)
Median household income	$54,400	$42,880	$35,348

References: 2021 2016 2011

Historical census populations – Limerick, Ontario

Year	Pop.	±%
1881	563	—
1891	508	−9.8%
1901	597	+17.5%
1911	448	−25.0%
1921	271	−39.5%
1931	316	+16.6%
1941	345	+9.2%
1951	292	−15.4%

Year	Pop.	±%
1956	336	+15.1%
1961	336	+0.0%
1966	224	−33.3%
1971	233	+4.0%
1976	282	+21.0%
1981	310	+9.9%
1986	310	+0.0%
1991	347	+11.9%

Year	Pop.	±%
1996	396	+14.1%
2001	362	−8.6%
2006	364	+0.6%
2011	352	−3.3%
2016	346	−1.7%
2021	436	+26.0%

Source: Statistics Canada

Mother tongue (2021):

- English as first language: 94.3%
- French as first language: 1.1%
- English and French as first language: 0%
- Other as first language: 3.4%

== Mining ==
Pancontinental Resources Corporation's (Pancon) plans to build a nickel, copper, and cobalt mine in Limerick was met with resistance from the local community in 2018. 5.1 million tons of nickel, cobalt, and copper exist near the surface of a 880 hectare area known as the McBride Project, located near Canadian National Railway, mining rights to the area are owned by Derek McBride's private company Hastings Highlands Resources Limited, which had an option agreement with Pancon. Pancon ceased collaborating on the project in March 2019, while McBridge spoke on Moose FM about his aspirations to find a new business partner.

== See also ==
- List of communities in Ontario
- List of townships in Ontario
