= Allen Creek (Haliburton County) =

Allen Creek ruisseau Allen
- Location of the mouth of Allen Creek in Southern Ontario

Location
- Country: Canada
- Province: Ontario
- Region: Central Ontario
- County: Haliburton County
- Municipalities: Dysart et al

Physical characteristics
- Source: Little Allen Lake
  - coordinates: 45°06′23″N 78°14′29″W
  - elevation: 450 metres (1,480 ft)
- Mouth: Benoir Lake
  - coordinates: 45°09′54″N 78°09′01″W
  - elevation: 352 metres (1,155 ft)

Basin features
- River system: Ottawa River drainage basin

Allen Creek (French: ruisseau Allen) is a stream in the municipality of Dysart et al, Haliburton County in Central Ontario, Canada. It is a tributary of Benoir Lake and is in the Ottawa River drainage basin.

== Course ==
Allen Creek begins at Little Allen Lake at an elevation of 450 metres (1,480 ft), at the height of land between the Ottawa River drainage basin to the north and east, and the Trent River drainage basin to the west and south. It flows north to the southwest end of Allen Lake, then exits the lake at the north continuing briefly north. It then turns east, takes in the right tributary Straggle Creek and reaches the west end of Fishtail Lake. It leaves Fishtail Lake at the northeast end, heads northeast, and reaches its mouth at Benoir Lake at an elevation of 352 metres (1,155 ft). Benoir Lake flows via the York River and the Madawaska River to the Ottawa River.
