= Petroglyphs Provincial Park =

Canadian provincial park

- IUCN category III (natural monument or feature)
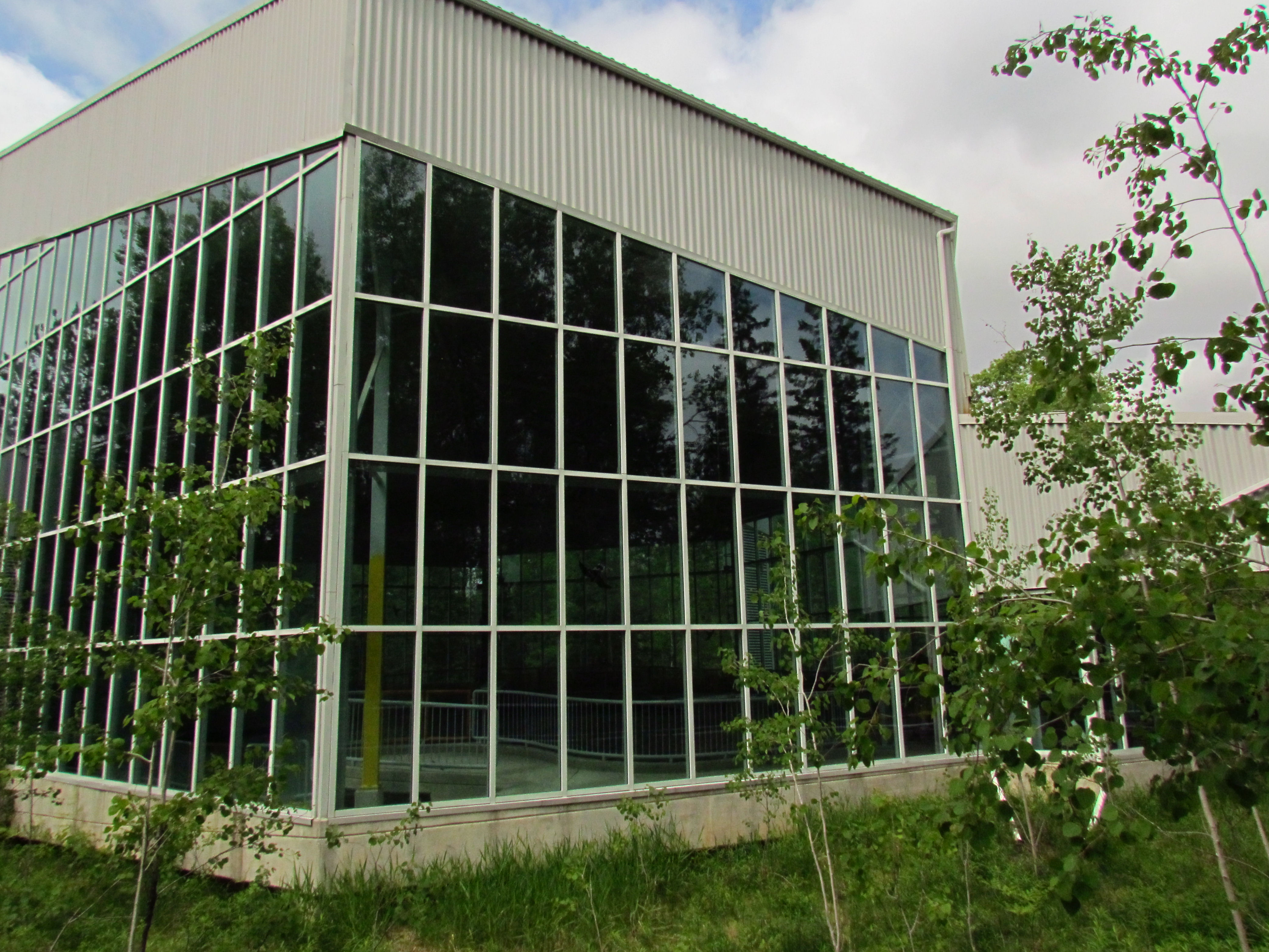
- Building protecting petroglyphs

- Location within Southern Ontario
- Interactive map of Petroglyphs Provincial Park
- Location: Woodview, Ontario, Canada
- Nearest city: Peterborough
- Coordinates: 44°36′55″N 78°02′27″W
- Area: 16.43 km^{2} (6.34 sq mi)
- Established: 1976
- Visitors: 17,735 (in 2022)
- Governing body: Ontario Parks
- Website: https://www.ontarioparks.ca/park/petroglyphs

National Historic Site of Canada
- Official name: Peterborough Petroglyphs National Historic Site of Canada
- Designated: 1981

Petroglyphs Provincial Park is a historical-class provincial park situated in Woodview, Ontario, Canada, northeast of Peterborough. It has the largest collection of ancient First Nations petroglyphs (rock carvings) in Ontario. The carvings were created in the pre-Columbian era and represents aspects of First Nations spirituality, including images of shamans, animals, reptiles, and, possibly, the Great Spirit itself.

The location of the site was kept hidden from non-First Nation people until 1954, when it was rediscovered accidentally by a prospector (Everett Davis) of the Industrial Minerals of Canada. The immediate area of the petroglyphs has been designated a National Historic Site of Canada.

== Petroglyph origins ==
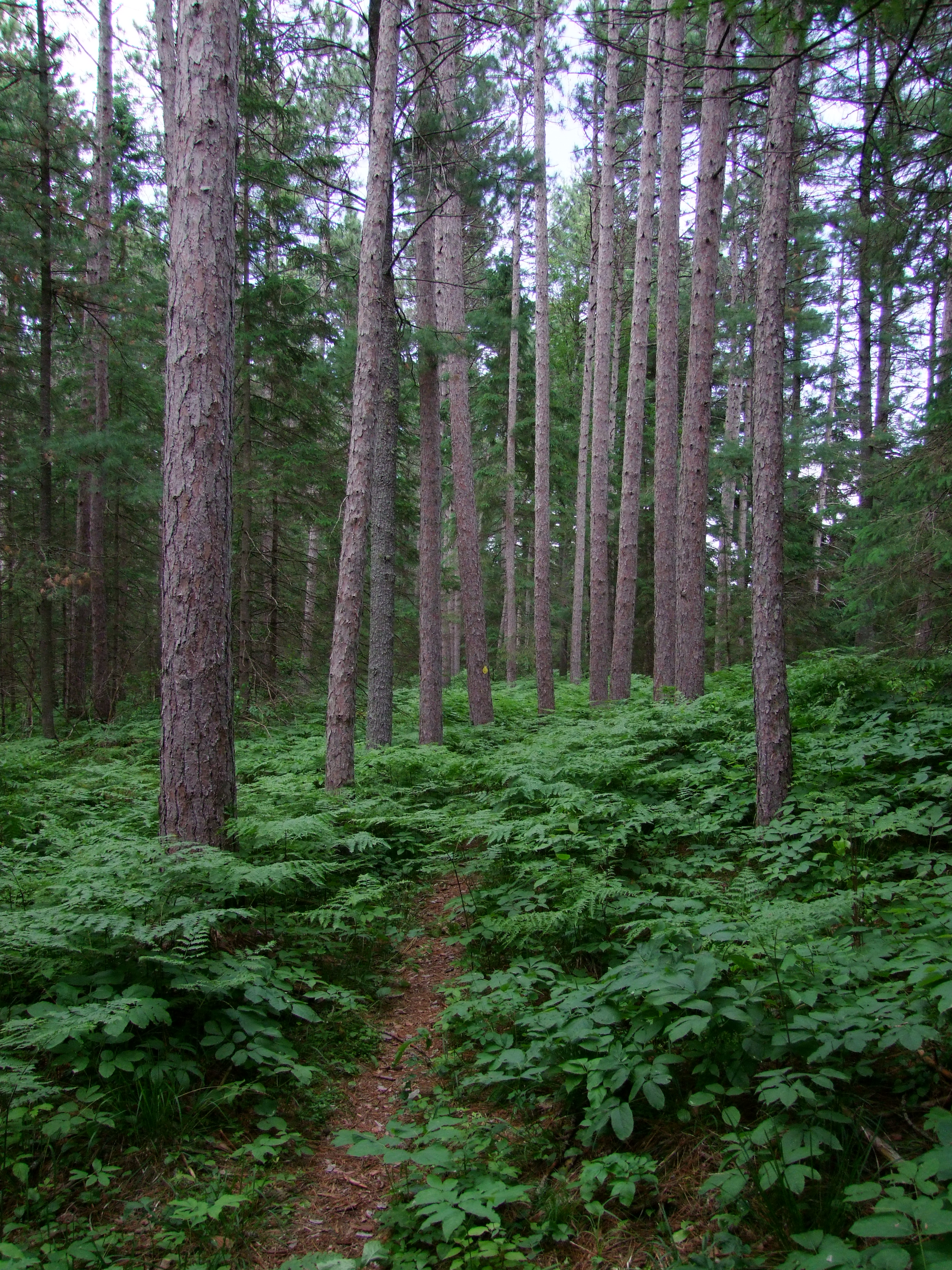
A forest habitat of primarily Red Pine and Sarsaparilla

The stone is generally believed to have been carved by the Algonquian or Iroquoian speaking people between 900 and 1100 AD., if not somewhat earlier during the Archaic. Today, the First Nations people of Ontario call the carvings Kinomagewapkong, meaning "the rocks that teach" or "the Teaching Rocks". Originally two to three inches deep the 1200 carvings were made using gneiss hammers to incise human figures, animals, and a dominant figure whose head apparently represents the sun, onto the soft, gently sloping walls.

The petroglyphs were first thoroughly recorded in 1965 and 1968 by Joan Vastokas of the University of Toronto and Ron Vastokas of Trent University in Peterborough. Their book, Sacred art of the Algonkians : a study of the Peterborough petroglyphs, is considered by rock art scholars the most definitive study and interpretation to date.

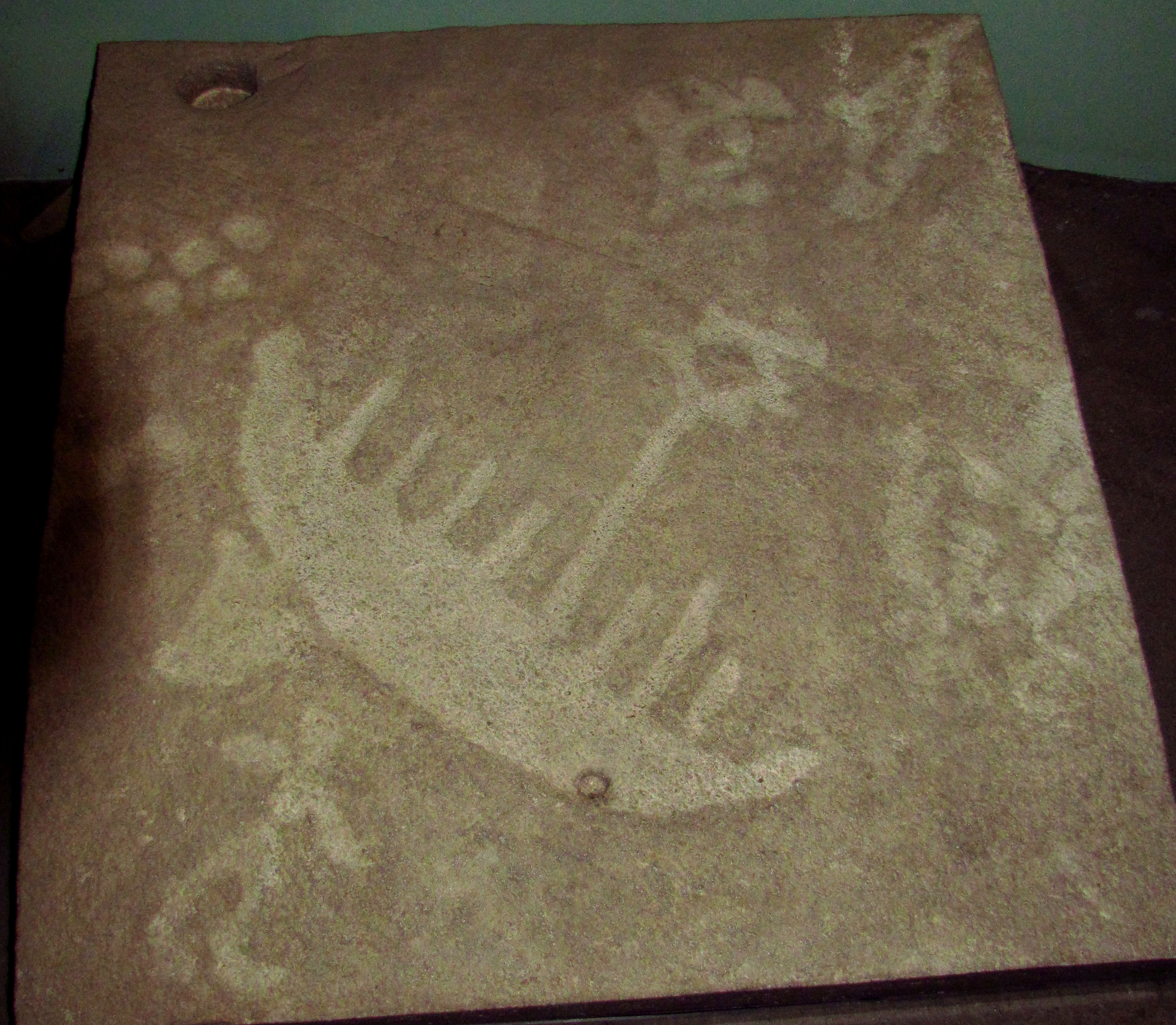
Cast of some of the petroglyphs

According to the Learning Center, while the glyphs are important, they are not the primary reason this site is sacred. The rock site itself is a sacred place. And today is a place of pilgrimage for local Anishinaabe people. The deep crevices in the rock are believed to lead to the spirit world, as there is an underground trickle of water that runs beneath the rock which produces sounds interpreted by Indigenous people as those of the Spirits speaking to them.

== Ecology ==
Although officially a Historical Class park, the petroglyphs themselves are actually concentrated in a relatively small area of the 1,643 hectares (4,060 acres) park. The rest consists of primarily woodland habitat home to several provincially rare species, such as the five-lined skink, Eumeces fasciatus.

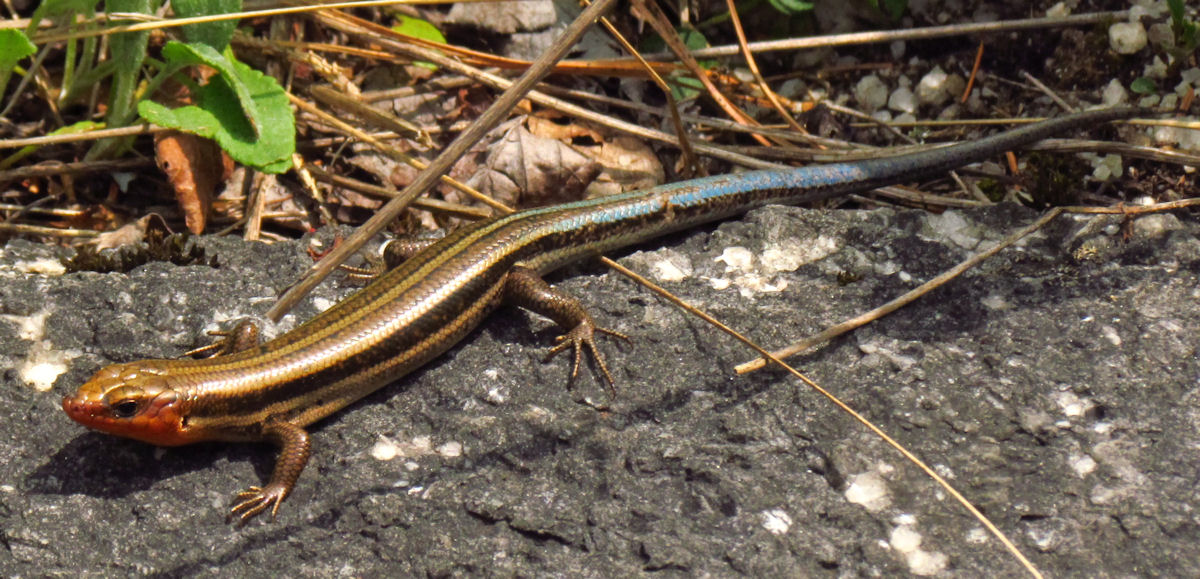
Five-lined Skink (Plestiodon fasciatus)

As the park also borders the nearby Peterborough Crown Game Preserve a number of animals indigenous to the area may also be spotted including: beavers, otters, white-tailed deer, squirrels, chipmunks and the occasional wolf. A great number of birds can also be spotted including: wild turkeys, woodpeckers, grouse, hawks, jays and eagles.

== Facilities ==
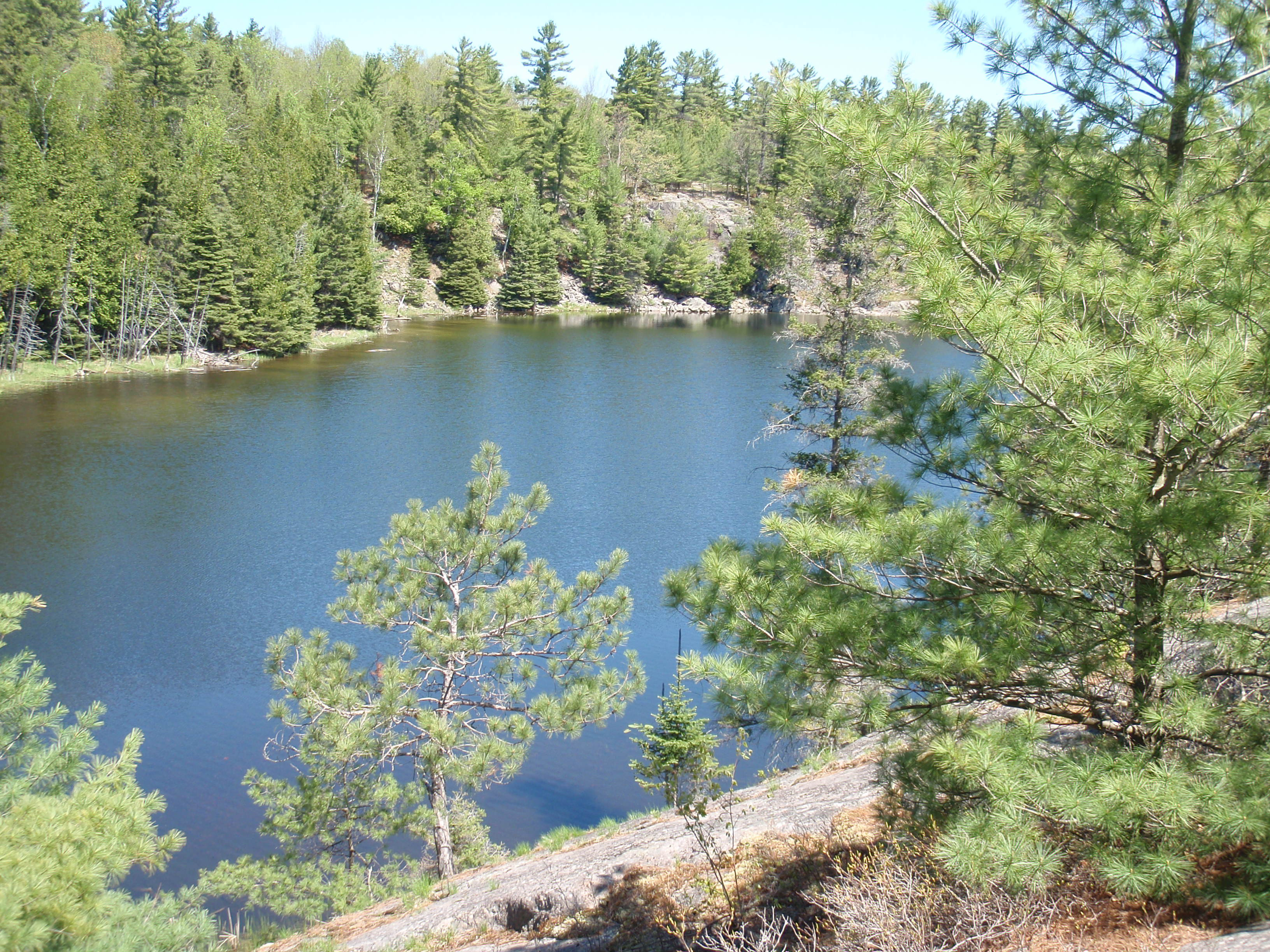
Minnow Lake

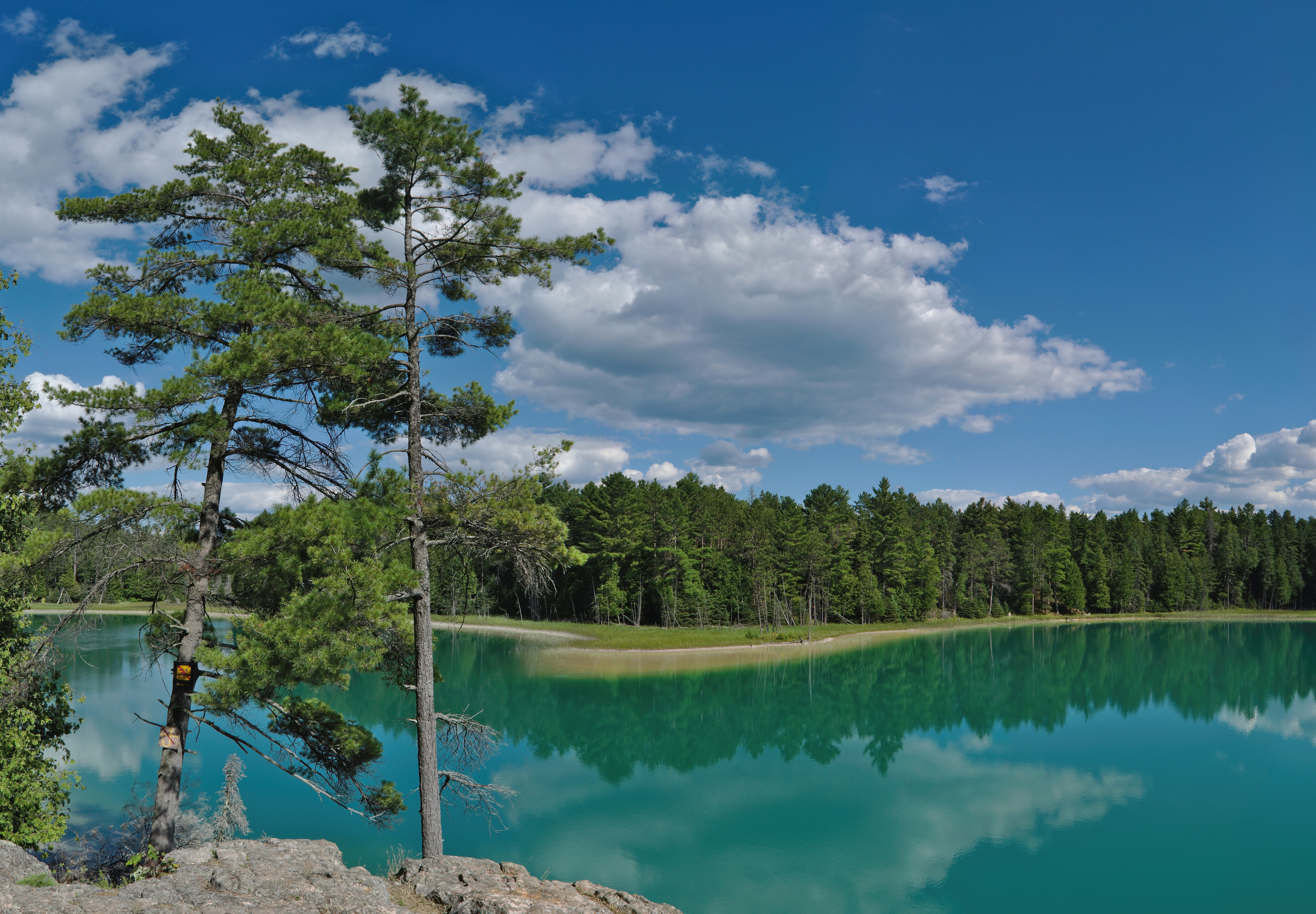
McGinnis Lake, Petroglyphs Provincial Park, Canada

The park is open 10 am to 5 pm daily (excepting Mondays and Tuesdays in the spring and fall) from the second Friday in May to Thanksgiving. The park's visitor centre is known as the Learning Place, and opened in 2002. The centre is managed by Curve Lake First Nation, and features displays about the petroglyphs and their spiritual significance to the First Nations people. A movie The Teaching Rocks is shown daily, upon request and during evening programs. There is also a children's hands-on activity room and a gift shop.

The rock carvings are covered by a protective building, and there are interpretive plaques and guides at the site. Photographing and videotaping the rock carvings is not permitted for spiritual reasons, and dogs are not allowed inside any of the buildings.

== See also ==
- Sanilac Petroglyphs Historic State Park, largest collection of ancient Native American petroglyphs in Michigan, U.S.A.
