= Craigmont =

Craigmont may refer to:

- Craigmont, Idaho, United States
- Craigmont, Ontario, Canada

== See also ==
- Craigmont High School, a public high school in Memphis, Tennessee
- Craigmount (disambiguation)
