= Carlow/Mayo =

Carlow Mayo
- Township (lower-tier)
- Township of Carlow Mayo
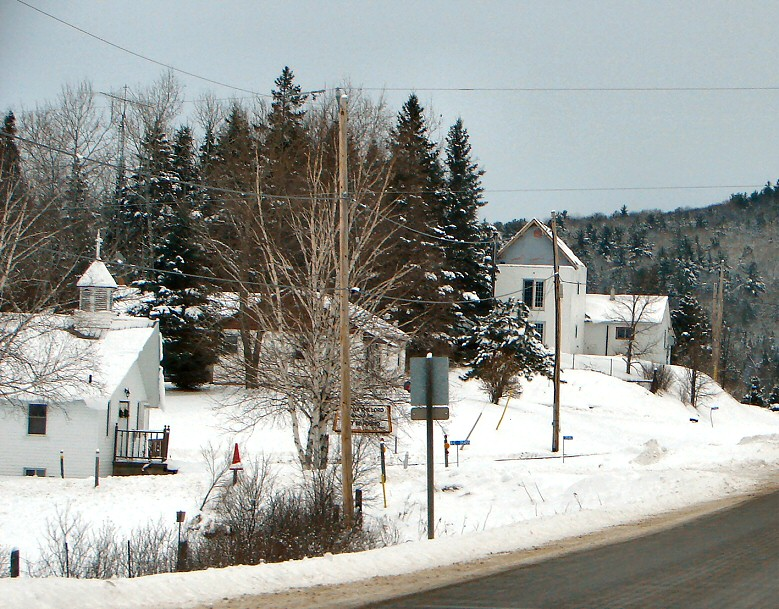
- Community of McArthur Mills along Hwy 28.

- Location within Southern Ontario
- Coordinates: 45°08′N 77°37′W
- Country: Canada
- Province: Ontario
- County: Hastings
- Settled: 1850s
- Incorporated: January 1, 2001

Government
  - Type: Township
  - Mayor: Randy Wallace
  - Federal riding: Hastings—Lennox and Addington—Tyendinaga
  - Prov. riding: Hastings—Lennox and Addington

Area
  - Land: 385.32 km^{2} (148.77 sq mi)

Population (2021)
  - Total: 953
  - Density: 2.5/km^{2} (6.5/sq mi)
- Time zone: UTC-5 (EST)
  - Summer (DST): UTC-4 (EDT)
- Postal Code: K0L 1G0
- Area codes: 613, 343
- Website: www.carlowmayo.ca

Carlow Mayo is a township in northern Hastings County in Eastern Ontario, Canada. It was formed in 2001 by the amalgamation of the townships of Carlow and Mayo.

Historically, the economy in the area was based on timber and mining. The Little Mississippi River and York River were used to transport logs out of the forests. Now, tourism is an important part of the local economy. Over half of the land in the region is designated crown land.

Carlow and Mayo were named after the counties of the same name in Ireland (County Carlow and County Mayo).

Communities within the municipal boundaries include: Bessemer, Boulter, Childs Mines, Craigmont, Fort Stewart, Hartsmere, Havergal, Hermon, McArthur Mills, New Carlow, and Rowland.

== Demographics ==
In the 2021 Census of Population conducted by Statistics Canada, Carlow/Mayo had a population of 953 living in 416 of its 663 total private dwellings, a change of 10.3% from its 2016 population of 864. With a land area of 385.32 km^{2} (148.77 sq mi), it had a population density of 2.5/km^{2} (6.4/sq mi) in 2021.

Canada census – Carlow/Mayo community profile

	2021	2016	2011
Population	953 (+10.3% from 2016)	864 (-3.1% from 2011)	892 (-6.1% from 2006)
Land area	385.32 km^{2} (148.77 sq mi)	390.79 km^{2} (150.88 sq mi)	390.94 km^{2} (150.94 sq mi)
Population density	2.5/km^{2} (6.5/sq mi)	2.2/km^{2} (5.7/sq mi)	2.3/km^{2} (6.0/sq mi)
Median age	55.2 (M: 54.8, F: 55.6)	54.1 (M: 54.9, F: 52.8)
Private dwellings	663 (total) 416 (occupied)	627 (total)	585 (total)
Median household income	$68,000	$54,208

References: 2021 2016 2011

Historical census populations – Carlow/Mayo

Year	Pop.	±%
1996	891	—
2001	833	−6.5%
2006	950	+14.0%

Year	Pop.	±%
2011	892	−6.1%
2016	864	−3.1%
2021	953	+10.3%

Source: Statistics Canada

Mother tongue (2021):

- English as first language: 93.7%
- French as first language: 1.0%
- English and French as first language: 0%
- Other as first language: 4.2%

== See also ==
- List of townships in Ontario
