= York River (Ontario) =

River in Ontario, Canada

- York River, Bancroft

- Location of the mouth of the York River in southern Ontario
- Native name: Shawashkong

Location
- Country: Canada
- Province: Ontario
- Regions: Eastern Ontario; Central Ontario
- Counties: Renfrew; Hastings; Haliburton

Physical characteristics
- Source: Yorkend Lake
  - location: Dysart et al, Haliburton County, Central Ontario
  - coordinates: 45°18′01″N 78°20′21″W
  - elevation: 497 m (1,631 ft)
- Mouth: Madawaska River
  - location: Madawaska Valley, Renfrew County, Eastern Ontario
  - coordinates: 45°20′08″N 77°34′43″W
  - elevation: 283 m (928 ft)

Basin features
- Progression: Madawaska River→ Ottawa River→ St. Lawrence River→ Gulf of St. Lawrence
- River system: Saint Lawrence River drainage basin

The York River is a river in Renfrew County, Hastings County and Haliburton County in Ontario, Canada, originally known as the Shawashkong River and as the Mishawashkong River (meaning "River of the Marshes").

The river is in the Saint Lawrence River drainage basin, and flows from the southern extension of Algonquin Provincial Park to the Madawaska River.

The river alternates between fast flowing portions in steep sided gorges to slower movement through post-glacial sand flats. Changes in the course of the river have created ponds and wetlands in the form of ox-bows.

== Course ==
The river begins in the southern extension of Algonquin Provincial Park at Yorkend Lake, in geographic Clyde Township in the municipality of Dysart et al, Haliburton County.

It flows west out of the park through geographic Eyre Township and Harburn Township, then loops back east into the southernmost part of the park in geographic Bruton Township. It takes in the left tributary North York River just before Branch Lake, turns southeast, passes over the High Falls, and exits the park into Benoir Lake.

It continues east into Baptiste Lake where it enters geographic Herschel Township in the municipality of Hastings Highlands, Hastings County. The river leaves the lake south at the lake's southeast tip, controlled by the Ontario Ministry of Natural Resources-operated Baptiste Lake Dam, enters the town of Bancroft, and passes over the Bancroft Light & Power Generating Station and dam. The river is crossed by Ontario Highway 28 and Ontario Highway 62 in the town centre, then turns east and northeast. It is crossed again by Ontario Highway 28, passes over Egan Chute and Farm Chute at Egan Chutes Provincial Park, and briefly reenters Hastings Highlands at geographic Monteagle Township.

The river continues northeast into geographic Carlow Township in the municipality of Carlow/Mayo, passes over the Conroy Rapids and enters the Conroy Marsh, a 24 km^{2} (9 sq mi) provincially significant wetland. As the river flows through the marsh, it first passes into the municipality of Brudenell, Lyndoch and Raglan, Renfrew County, then takes in the right tributary Little Mississippi River. The river then reaches its mouth as a right tributary of the Madawaska River in geographic Radcliffe Township in the municipality of Madawaska Valley, near the community of Mayhews Landing. The Madawska River flows via the Ottawa River to the Saint Lawrence River.

=== List of waterfalls ===
- Egan Chute
- Flat Rapids
- Farm Chute
- High Falls, Baptiste Lake (somewhat less dramatic as a result of the High Falls Dam which regulates the water level for Baptiste Lake)
- High Falls, Benoir Lake

=== List of tributaries ===
- Little Mississippi River (right)
- Papineau Creek (left)
- Alder Creek (left)
- Salmon Trout Creek (left)
- Mallard Creek (right)
- Bresnahan Creek (left)
- Bentley Creek (left)
- L'Amable Creek (right)
- Egan Creek (right)
- Bear's Head Creek (right)
- Clark Creek (right)
- Faraday Creek (right)
- Baptiste Lake
  - McGarry Creek (left)
  - Hound Creek (left)
  - Hudson Creek (right)
  - Hamilton Creek (left)
  - Lighthouse Creek (left)
  - Chainy Creek (left)
- Elephant Creek (right)
- Benoir Lake
  - Allen Creek (right)
  - Fourcorner Creek (right)
  - Kingscote Creek (right)
- Mink Creek (left)
- North York River (left)
- Clyde Creek (left)

== History ==
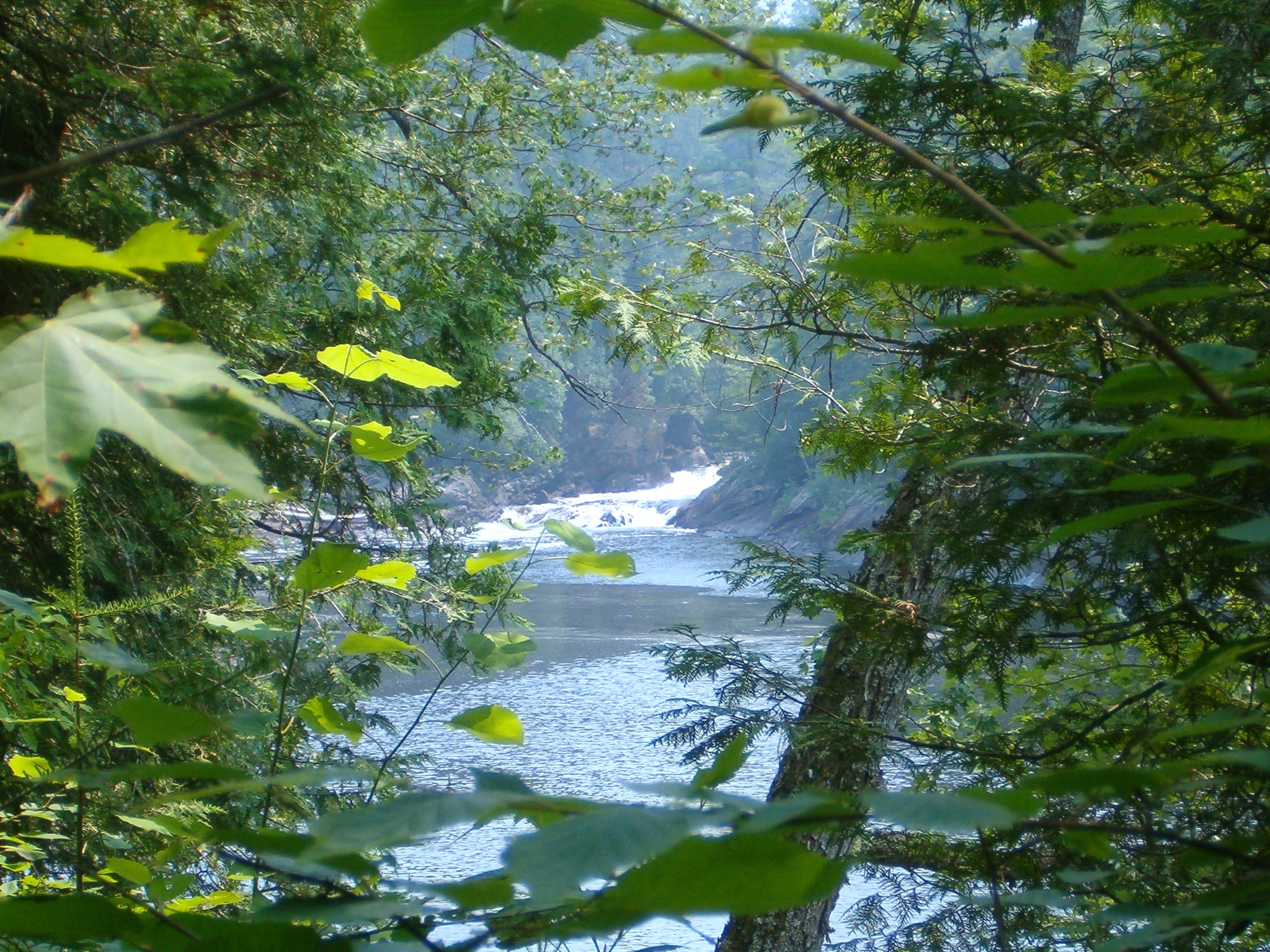
Flat Rapids on the York River, seen from a distance through the trees

In ancient times, river was a major spillway for glacial meltwaters.

In the early 1800s, the Algonquin and Nipissing Chief Jean Baptiste Kijikomanito moved to Kaijick Manitou Lake (now Baptiste Lake), on the banks of the river. When European settlers started arriving in the area, Baptiste's family guided them in hunting and fishing. The river was originally known as Shawashkong and Mishawashkong, names that Alexander Murray understood to mean the river of the marshes in the Algonquin language when he explored the region in the mid 1850s.

When Murray explored the river, he described that he called the Grand Bend, a series of thirteen distinct rapids and waterfalls located between Little Mississippi Lake and Kaijick Manitou Lake (now, Baptiste Lake).

Egan Chutes Provincial Park

Bronson & Weston Company logged around Baptiste lake and created a wooden dam at the lake's headwater in 1866. The dam caused water levels behind it to rise, causing the lower and upper basins of Kaijick Manitou Lake/Baptiste Lake to merge into one. The rising water created islands in the lake, and creating flooding in Bancroft. In 1932, a concrete dam was constructed by Ontario Hydro to replace the wooden dam, yet flooding continued in Bancroft, until that dam was replaced in 1967.

Egan Chute Provincial Park nature reserve was created in 1989 to protect the river. Since 2005, the nature reserve has been regulated under Ontario's Provincial Parks and Conservation Reserves Act, and became regulated to protect the shoreline, wetlands, deciduous swamps and levee forests.

== In popular culture ==
Group of Seven artist A. J. Casson painted scenes of the river, including Autumn on the York River in 1959.

== See also ==
- List of Ontario rivers

== Sources ==
- Map 9 (PDF) (Map). 1 : 700,000. Official road map of Ontario. Ministry of Transportation of Ontario. 2012-01-01.
- Map 10 (PDF) (Map). 1 : 700,000. Official road map of Ontario. Ministry of Transportation of Ontario. 2012-01-01.
- Restructured municipalities - Ontario map #5 (Map). Restructuring Maps of Ontario. Ontario Ministry of Municipal Affairs and Housing. 2006. Archived from the original on 2020-05-11.
- McMurtrie, Jeffrey (2008). "Algonquin Provincial Park and the Haliburton Highlands". Wikimedia Commons.
