= Little Branch Lake =

Lake in Ontario, Canada

- Location within Ontario
- Location: Haliburton County, Ontario
- Coordinates: 45°18′45″N 78°14′34″W
- Primary outflows: North York River
- Basin countries: Canada
- Max. length: 3.51 km (2.18 mi)
- Max. width: 0.57 km (0.35 mi)
- Surface elevation: 417 m (1,368 ft)

Little Branch Lake is a lake in Haliburton County, Ontario, Canada in the southern extension of Algonquin Park and is the source of the North York River.

== See also ==
- List of lakes in Ontario

== Sources ==
- Atlas of Canada Topographic Map Sheet Number 031E08 retrieved 2007-11-04
