= Weslemkoon Lake =

Lake in Addington Highlands, Ontario, Canada

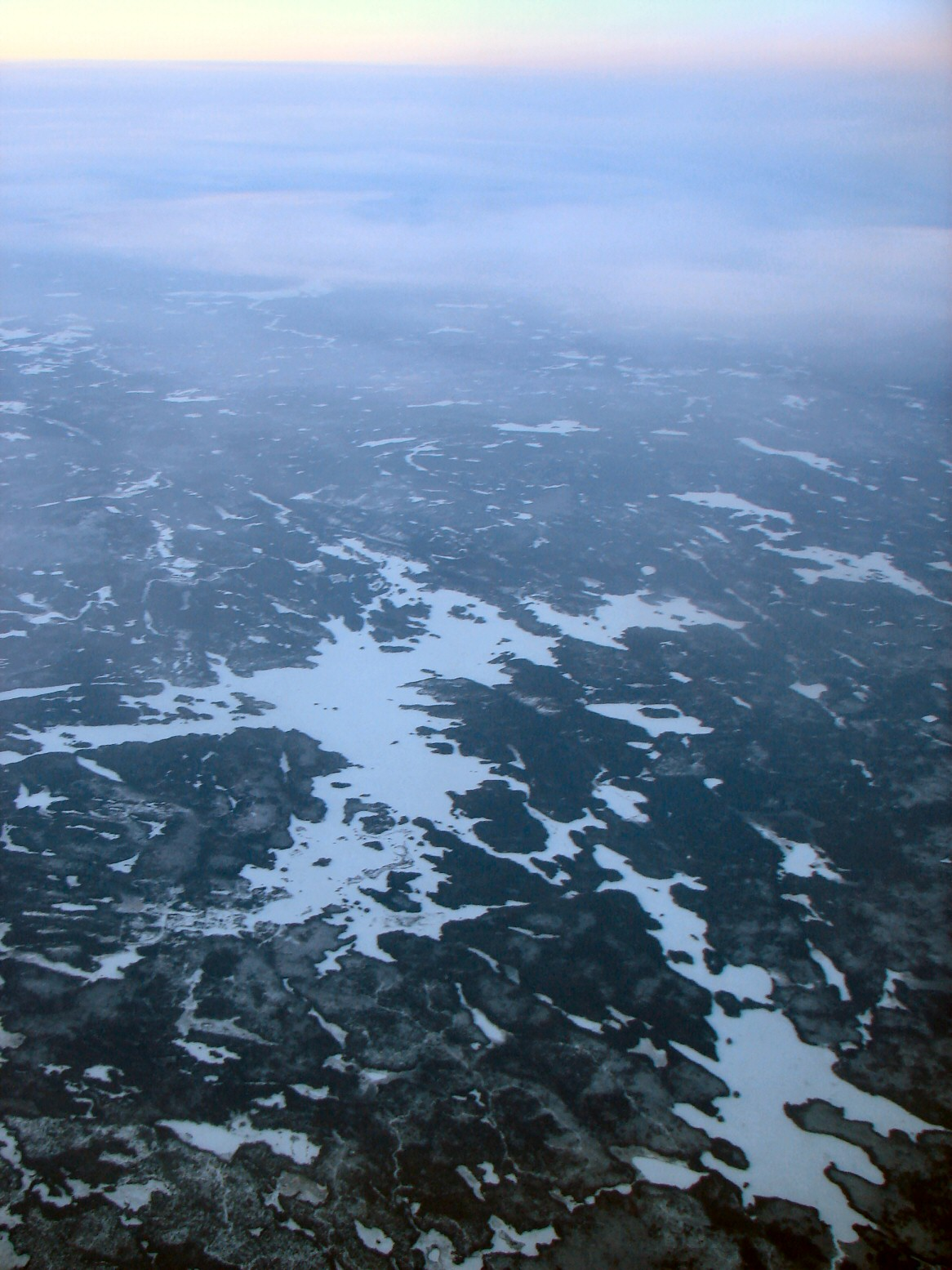
- in Winter

- Location within Ontario
- Location: Addington Highlands
- Coordinates: 45°02′00″N 77°25′52″W
- Primary outflows: Little Mississippi River
- Basin countries: Canada
- Max. length: 19.3 km (12.0 mi)
- Max. width: 2.5 km (1.6 mi)
- Max. depth: 54.9 m (180 ft)
- Surface elevation: 316 m (1,037 ft)

Weslemkoon Lake is located in the Township of Addington Highlands, Ontario, Canada, near Denbigh and about 110 km (68 mi) north of Belleville. The lake is well known for large and small-mouth bass and lake trout fishing.

The lake is characterized by a rocky shoreline, with numerous bays and coves that are home to bogs, and swampy areas. There are abundant islands, many of which are uninhabited or public land and can be used as recreational areas. Notable are the 5 islands, which are a small group of islands in the centre of the main body of the lake, a suspension bridge built between two islands, and Squaw Point, which is a treeless area where it is said Algonquin Native women and children retreated to during times of battle.

Among the lake's notable geographical features are the Five Islands, a scenic cluster situated in the center of the main body of water. Spanning the narrow gap between Island 700 and Island 701 is a unique, privately built suspension bridge.The bridge was constructed in the 1970s by brothers Robert "Bob" and Frank Walker, with the assistance of family and friends, to replicate British Columbia's famous Capilano Suspension Bridge on a much smaller scale. The structure was engineered to provide direct foot access between the two closely positioned islands, eliminating the need to swim or boat across a distance of only a few feet.The project's design evolved over time; the brothers originally constructed a floating walkway between the islands, but after it failed, they temporarily installed a zipline before ultimately engineering the permanent suspension bridge. In the decades since its construction, the iconic landmark has been completely restored with upgraded timber while continuing to utilize its original 1970s cabling

Lake Weslemkoon is located within Algonquins of Ontario Settlement Area, which is unceded land. Land parcel 323 and are part of the Proposed Settlement Lands, which as of 2020 are part of ongoing negotiations between the Crown and the Algonquin people.

When heading north on the lake from the southern end, a viewer would notice a lighthouse that has stood since the 1920s and, up until the installation of a large orange flashing beacon placed on top of a 55-gallon drum and mounted to a rock, served to mark the narrow entrance into the main body of the lake. The lighthouse cottage has been said to have been visited by Thomas Edison and Henry Ford.

Wildlife include: common loon, great blue heron, black bear, ruby throated hummingbird, pileated woodpecker, bald eagle, beaver, moose, great horned owl, lynx, and bobcat.

== See also ==
- List of lakes in Ontario
