= Conroy Marsh (Ontario) =

Wetland in Renfrew County, Ontario, Canada

Coordinates: 45°17′25″N 77°35′24″W

The Conroy Marsh is a provincially significant wetland in Renfrew County, Ontario. Covering an area of 2,400 hectares, it was designated as a conservation reserve in 2003. It is also known as Conroy's Marsh or Conroys Marsh.

Located at the junction of the Madawaska, York and Little Mississippi Rivers south of the village of Combermere, it was named after Robert Conroy, an Ottawa Valley lumber baron who held timber harvesting rights in the area. The wetland includes sections of marsh, fen and swamp. Plants found here include wild rice, and wild cranberries. Animals include bald eagles, ospreys, river otters and various ducks including ring-necked ducks.

Part of the wetland has been designated as a Crown Game Preserve.

Conroy Marsh was also the subject of a painting by Group of Seven member A. J. Casson.
