= Branch Lake (Ontario) =

Lake in Ontario, Canada

- Location within Ontario
- Location: Haliburton County, Ontario
- Coordinates: 45°14′12″N 78°13′54″W
- Primary inflows: York River, North York River
- Primary outflows: York River
- Basin countries: Canada
- Max. length: 1,340 m (4,396 ft)
- Max. width: 331 m (1,086 ft)
- Surface elevation: 394 m (1,293 ft)

Branch Lake is a lake in Haliburton County, Ontario, Canada in the southern extension of Algonquin Park. The York River flows into and exits from the lake. The North York River joins the York River at the lake.

== See also ==
- List of lakes in Ontario

== Sources ==
- Atlas of Canada Topographic Map Sheet Numbers 031E01 retrieved 2007-11-04
