= Egan Chutes Provincial Park =

Provincial park in Ontario, Canada

Egan Chutes Provincial Nature Reserve
- IUCN category Ia (strict nature reserve)
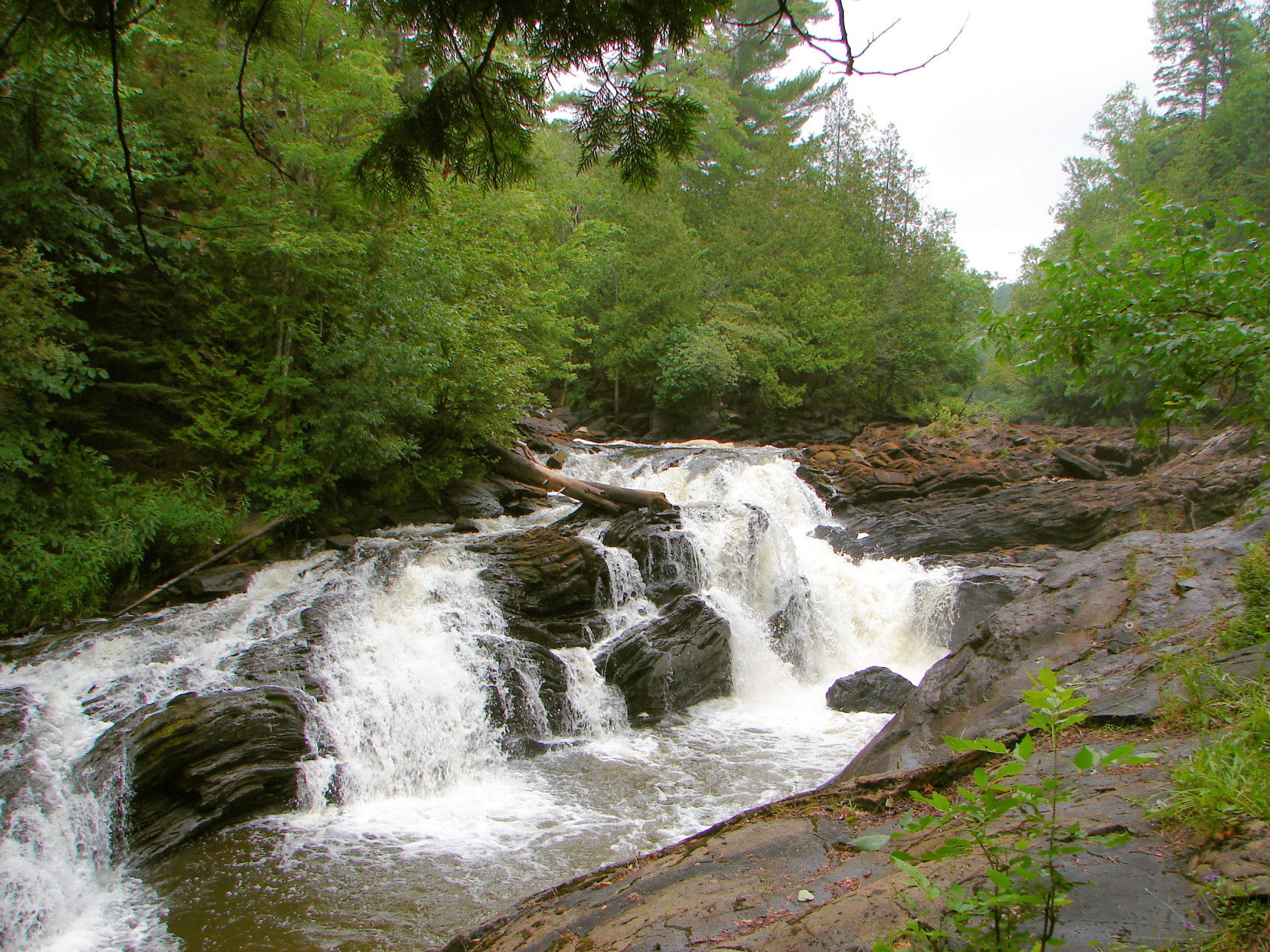

- Location within Southern Ontario
- Interactive map of Egan Chutes Provincial Nature Reserve
- Location: Hastings County, Ontario, Canada
- Nearest town: Bancroft
- Coordinates: 45°04′49″N 77°44′24″W
- Area: 343 ha (850 acres)
- Designation: Nature reserve
- Established: 1989
- Governing body: Ontario Parks
- Website: www.ontarioparks.com/park/eganchutes
- Egan Chutes Provincial Park Addition
- IUCN category II (national park)
- Coordinates: 45°06′00″N 77°45′00″W
- Length: 30 km (19 mi)
- Area: 778 ha (1,920 acres)
- Designation: Waterway
- Established: 2005

Egan Chutes Provincial Park is located 15 km (9.3 mi) east of Bancroft, Ontario, Canada. It was established as a provincial park in 1989 but is a non-operating park. Egan chutes is classified as a nature reserve, protecting a section of the York River.

== History ==
Egan Chutes Provincial Park was founded in 1989. The park is named after John Egan, a lumber baron.

In 2005, the park was extended with an additional 778 hectares (1,920 acres) that protects noncontiguous sections of the York River over a distance of 30 kilometres (19 mi) downstream. This addition has separate classification (Waterway) from the original park (Nature Reserve).

== Geology ==
Egan Chutes Provincial Park is located in the mineral capital of Canada. Nepheline, Biotite, Zircon, Blue Corundum and Sodalite - which is local to the area. Rock and mineral collecting is prohibited in the park.

== Recreational activities ==
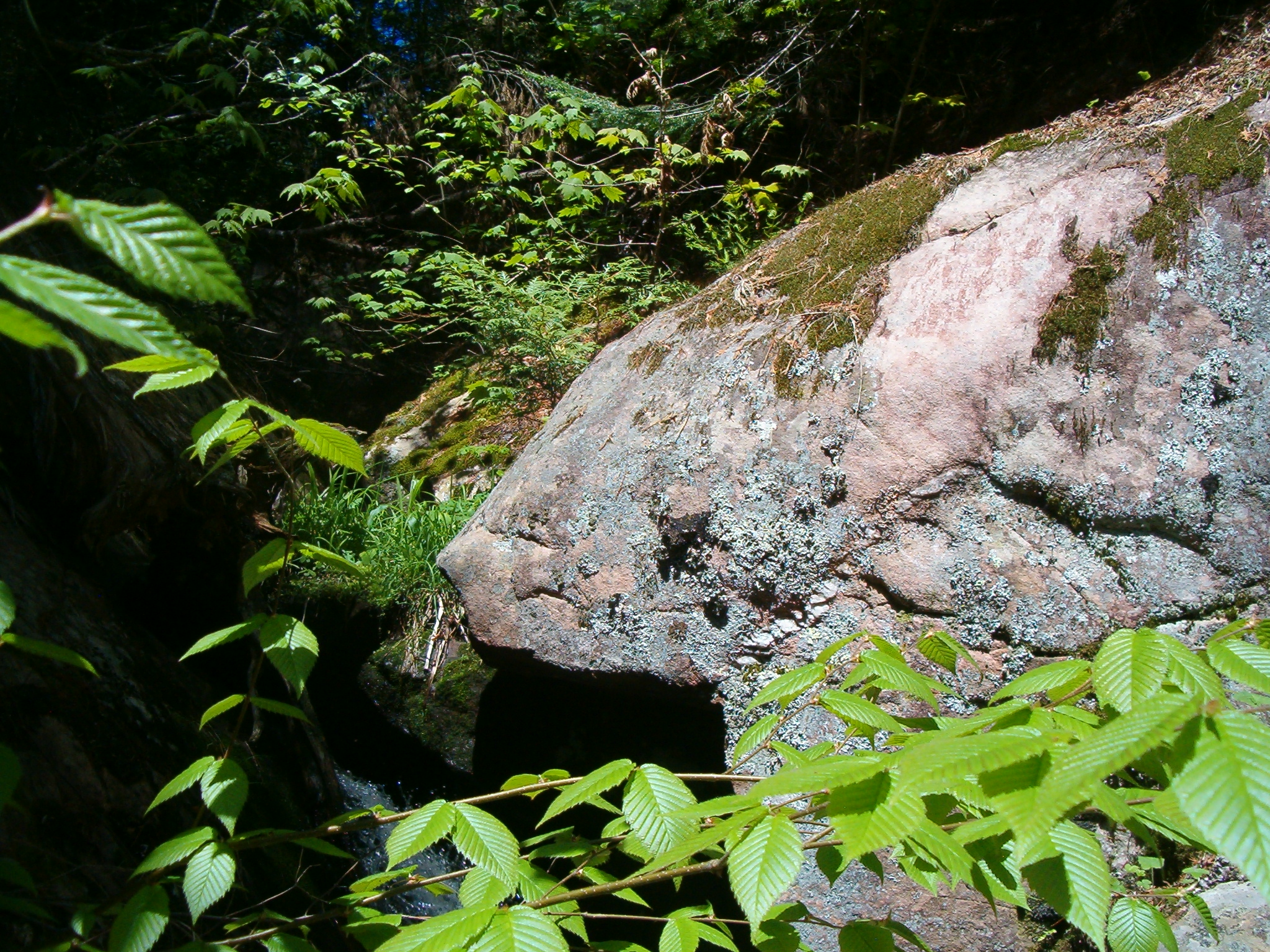
Bear's Head Rock, the namesake of Bear's Head Falls and Creek which are located in the north-central area of the park.

Canoeing, sport hunting, camping, hiking, and picnicking are among the activities available at Egan Chutes Provincial Park. There are two main hiking trails, one on each side of the river. The western side is accessed from a larger parking area and is the shorter trail; consequently it is the more frequently visited trail. It visits the namesake Egan Chute and the historical Goulding-Keene Quarry. The other trail across the river is significantly longer and visits the lower two chutes on the York River: Flat Rapids and Farm Chute, as well as Bear's Head Falls (which is on Bear's Head Creek, a small tributary to the York that is entirely contained within the park), and some geologically significant sites such as the York River Tactite Zone and Mammoth Rock.

York River is used for canoeing. Within the nature reserve, there are white water extensions associated with the three slideways. Each chute has a fixed conveyor; due to the very steep terrain, transportation is short but difficult. Downstream of the three chutes, the river winds its way, wide and slow. A 31.5 km (19.6 mi) canoe-free trip from the lower part of the Farm Chute to the northernmost boundary of the waterway is possible, with two launching sites along the way.

Winter leisure activities include snowshoeing, cross-country skiing and snowmobiling. There are no licensed snowmobile trails in the park, and snowmobile use is largely restricted to the east side of the river.

== Gallery ==
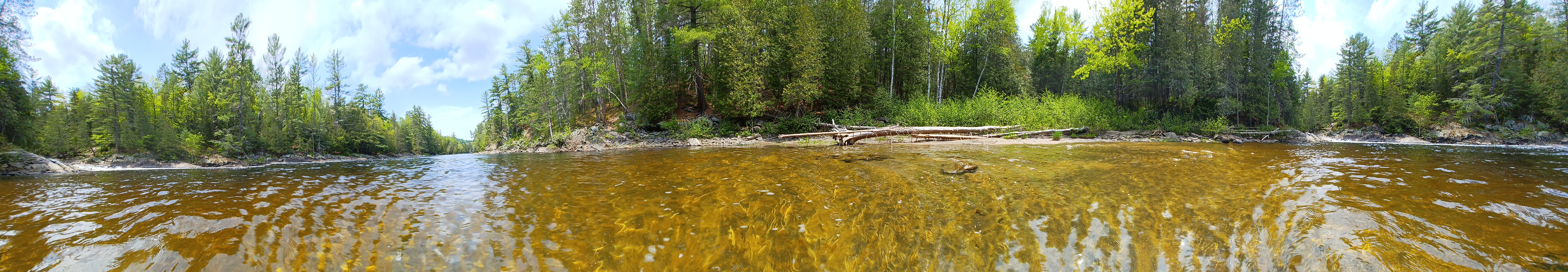
Panorama of the York River downstream of Flat Rapids.

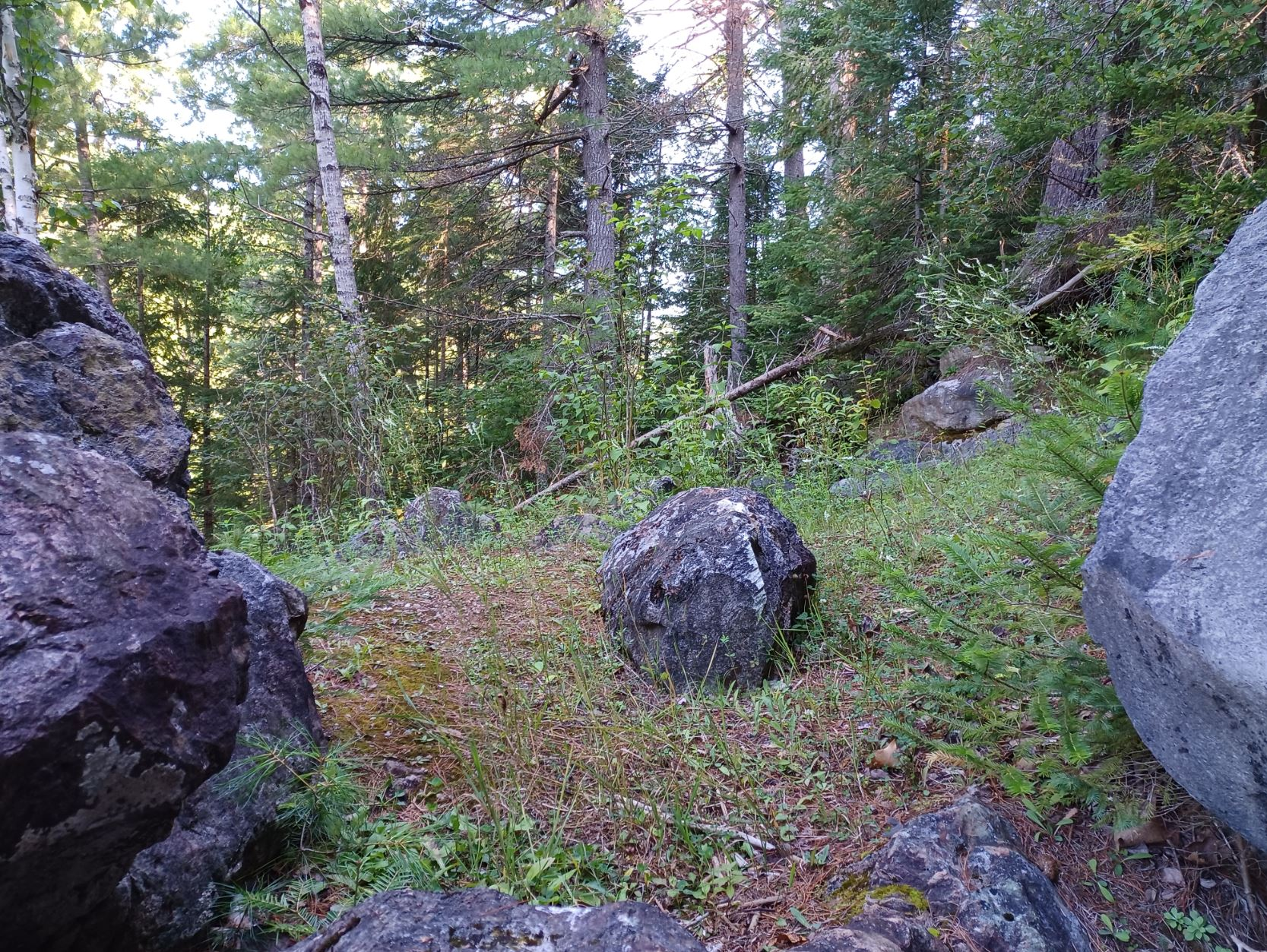
The York River Tactite Zone, a geologically significant feature of the park.

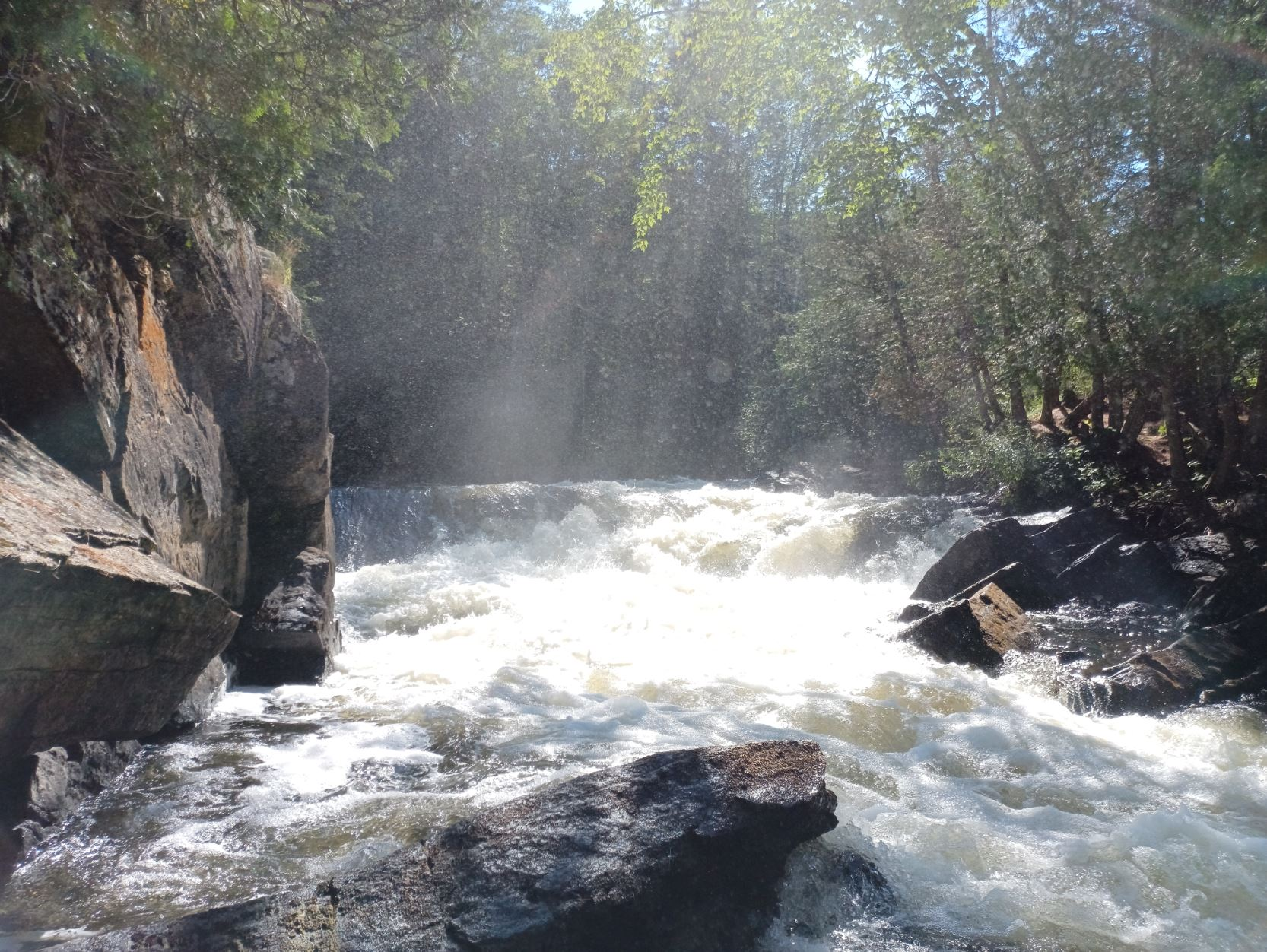
Egan Chute, the highest waterfall in the park.

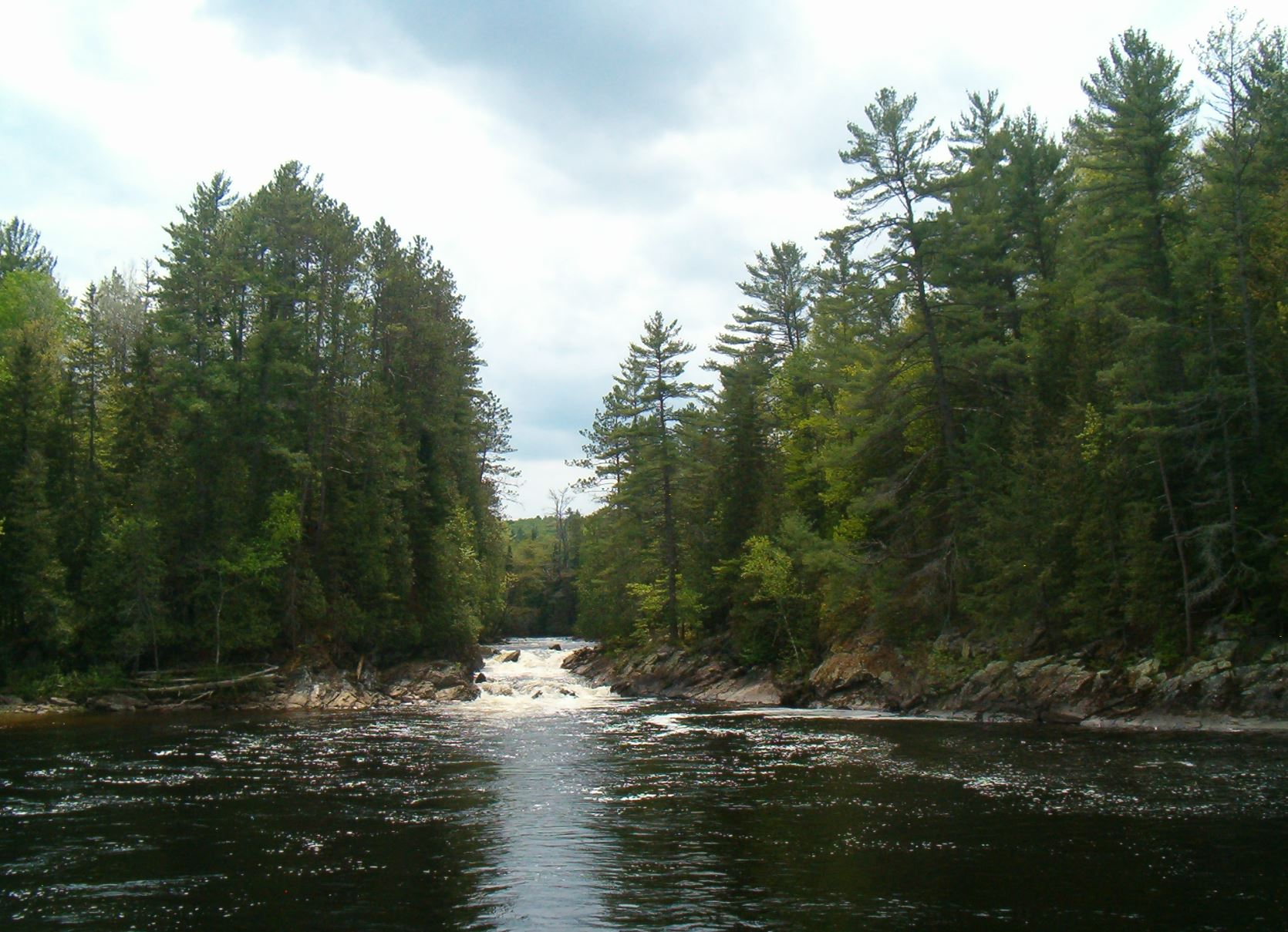
Flat Rapids, the park's middle waterfall.

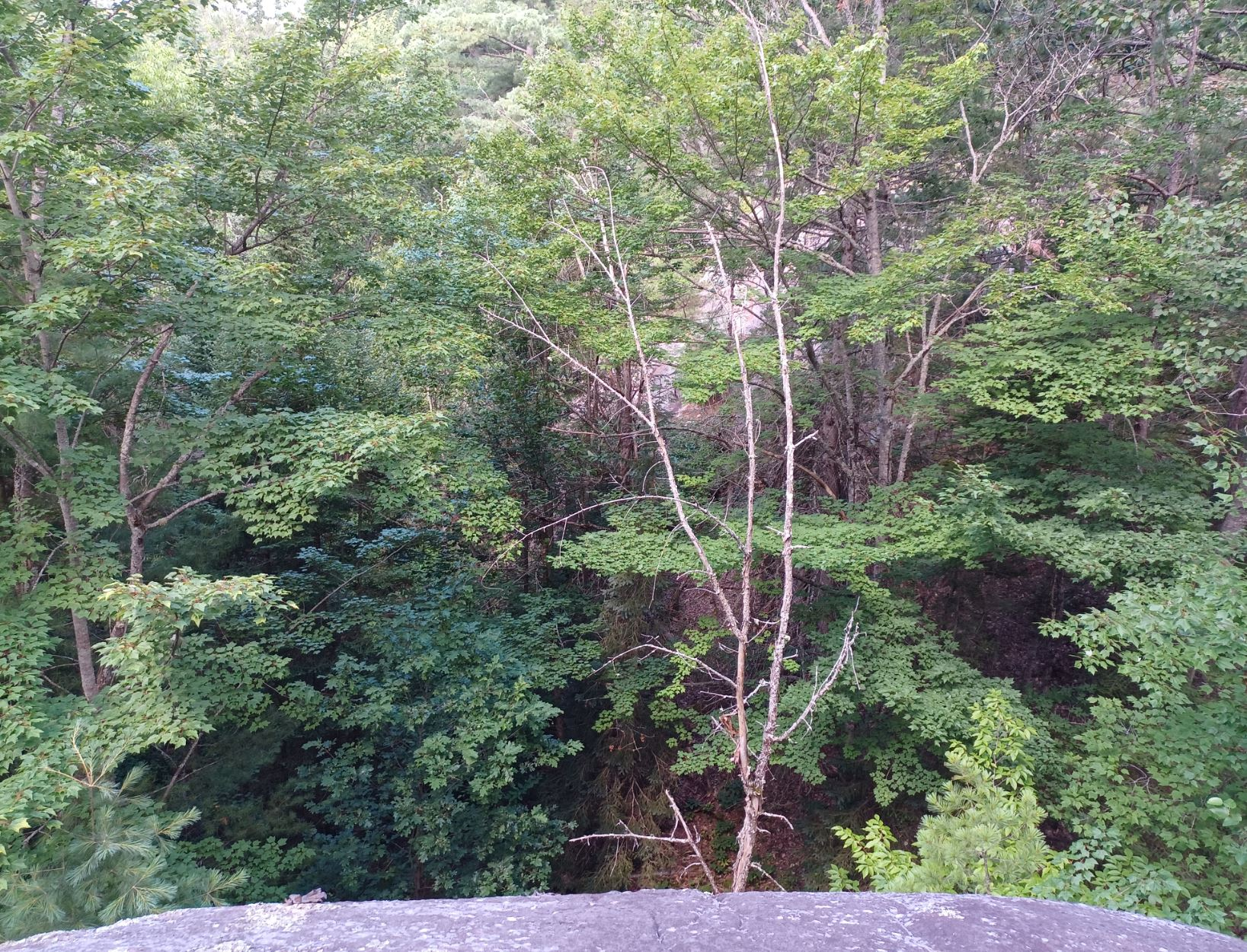
A view looking down from the top of Mammoth Rock, a geological feature in the park which is said to be the remnant of a prehistoric waterfall.

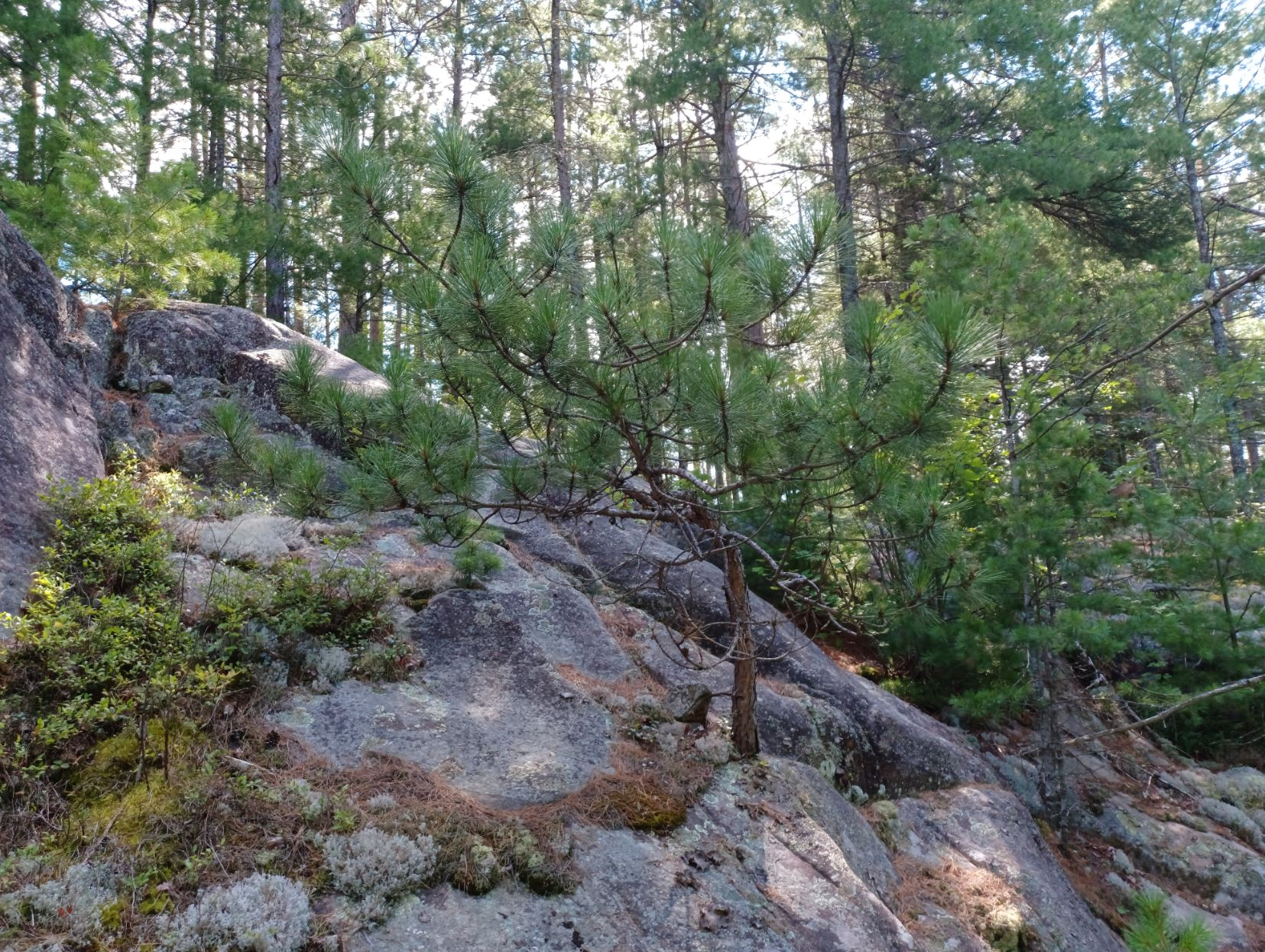
A Red Pine growing near the top of Mammoth Rock.

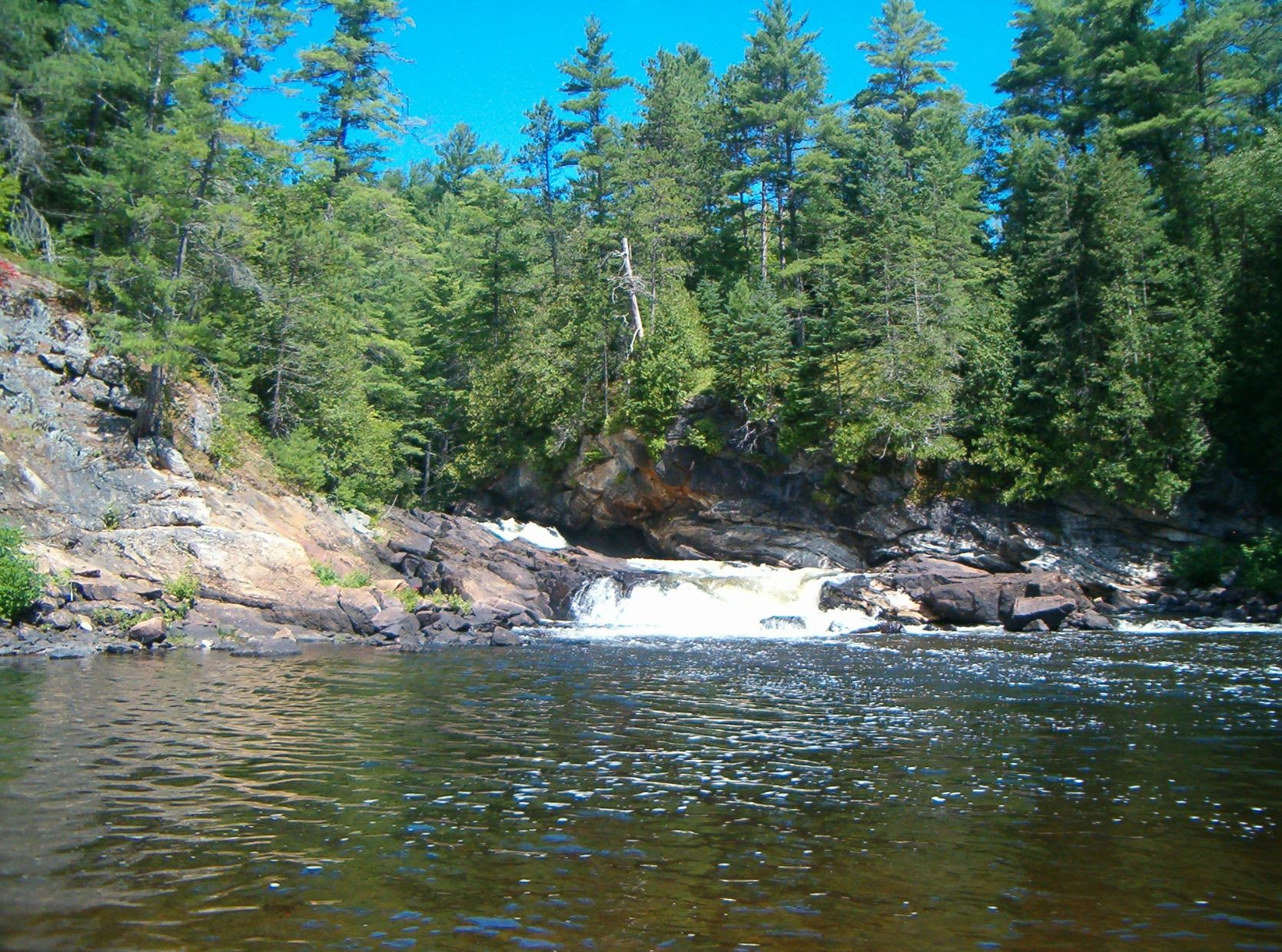
Farm Chute, the lowest waterfall in the park.

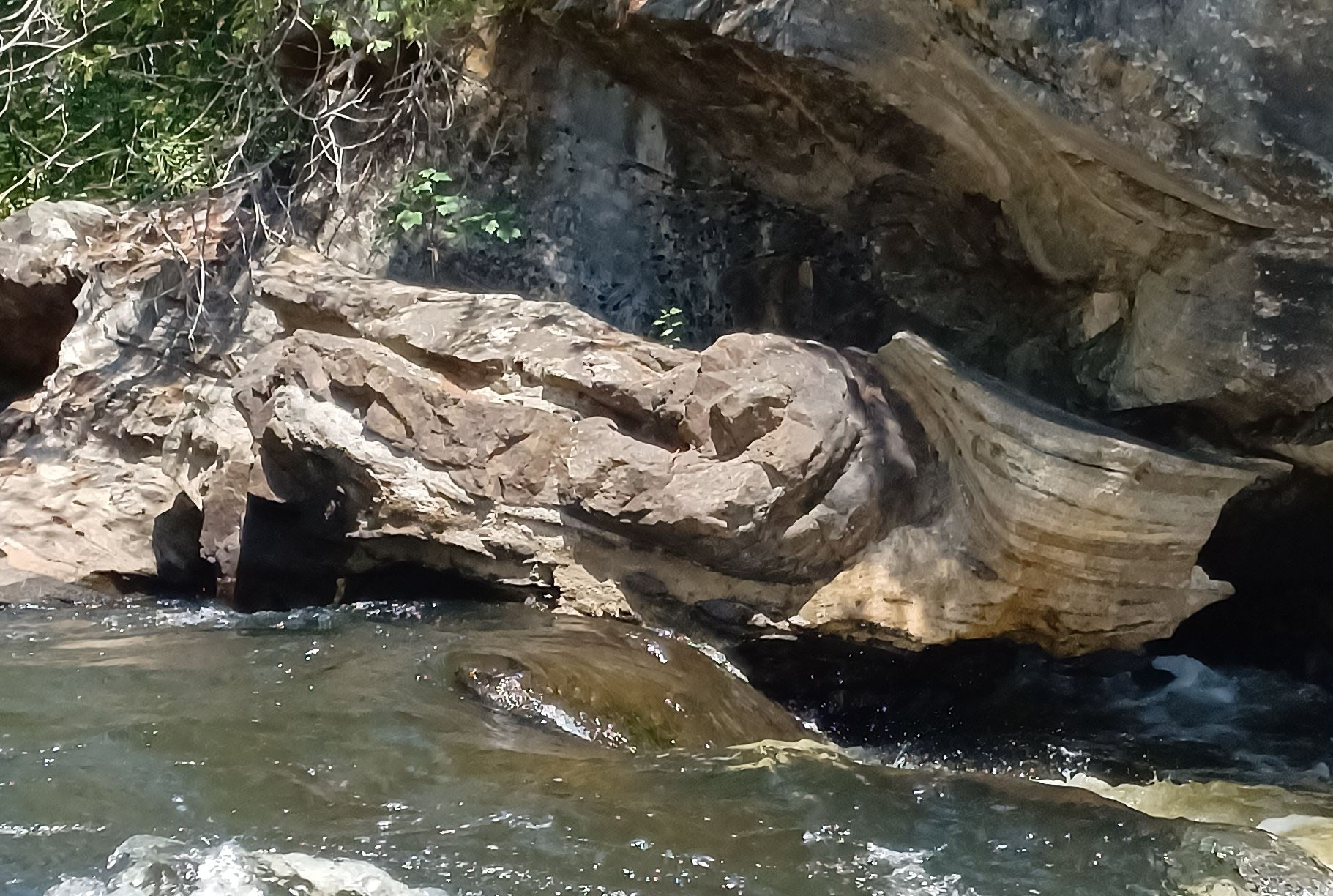
Ramshorn Rock, located at Farm Chute, is popular for its recognizable shape.

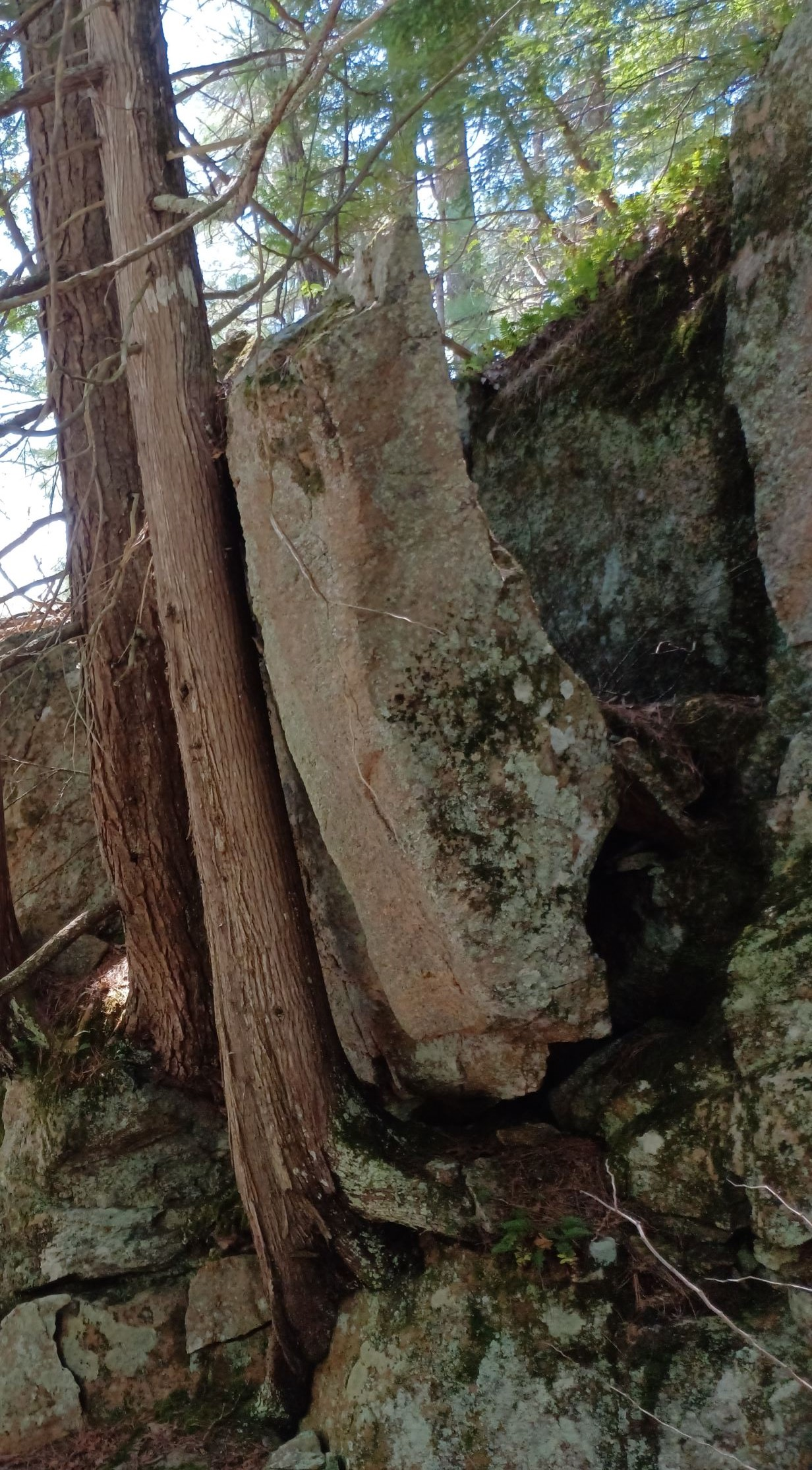
Atlas Rock, located in the park near Farm Chute, is part of a cliff which partially collapsed but is being held up by a single cedar tree.
