= North York River (Ontario) =

- Location of the mouth of the North York River in southern Ontario

Location
- Country: Canada
- Province: Ontario
- Region: Central Ontario
- County: Haliburton
- Municipality: Highlands East

Physical characteristics
- Source: Little Branch Lake
  - coordinates: 45°18′10″N 78°13′34″W
  - elevation: 416 m (1,365 ft)
- Mouth: York River
  - coordinates: 45°14′24″N 78°14′12″W
  - elevation: 394 m (1,293 ft)

Basin features
- River system: Great Lakes Basin

The North York River is a river in the municipality of Dysart et al, Haliburton County in Central Ontario, Canada. It is in the southern extension of Algonquin Provincial Park, is in the Saint Lawrence River drainage basin, and is a left tributary of the York River.

The river originates at Little Branch Lake in geographic Clyde Township. It flows southeast, south and west to Billings Lake in geographic Bruton Township. The river then heads south and reaches the York River just upstream of Branch Lake. The York River flows via the Madawaska River and Ottawa River to the Saint Lawrence River.

== See also ==
- List of Ontario rivers

== Sources ==
- Map 5 (PDF) (Map). 1 : 700,000. Official road map of Ontario. Ministry of Transportation of Ontario. 2012-01-01.
- Restructured municipalities - Ontario map #5 (Map). Restructuring Maps of Ontario. Ontario Ministry of Municipal Affairs and Housing. 2006. Archived from the original on 2020-05-11.
