= Craigmount =

Craigmount may refer to:

- Craigmount High School, non-denominational secondary school in Edinburgh, Scotland
- Craigmount School, a private school in Edinburgh, 1874–1966

== See also ==
- Craigmont (disambiguation)
