= Yorkend Lake (Ontario) =

Lake in Ontario, Canada

- Location within Ontario Location within Canada
- Location: Haliburton County, Ontario
- Coordinates: 45°18′01″N 78°20′16″W
- Primary outflows: York River
- Basin countries: Canada
- Max. length: 451 m (1,480 ft)
- Max. width: 268 m (879 ft)
- Surface elevation: 498 m (1,634 ft)

Yorkend Lake is a lake in Haliburton County, Ontario, Canada in the southern extension of Algonquin Park and is the source of the York River.

== See also ==
- List of lakes in Ontario

== Sources ==
- Atlas of Canada Topographic Map Sheet Number 031E08 retrieved 2007-11-04
