= Crown Game Preserve =

Wildlife refuge and game preserve in Ontario, Canada

A Crown Game Preserve is an officially designated natural area in Ontario, Canada, "primarily for the purpose of sustaining populations of game animals". Hunting is not permitted or strictly regulated, making it akin to a wildlife refuge. Crown Game Preserves are managed by the Government of Ontario Ministry of Natural Resources.

There are currently fifteen Crown Game Preserves:

- Brigden Crown Game Preserve
- Chapleau Crown Game Preserve
- Conestogo Crown Game Preserve
- Conroy Marsh Crown Game Preserve
- Dumfries Crown Game Preserve
- Geikie Island Crown Game Preserve
- Himsworth Crown Game Preserve
- Miner Crown Game Preserve
- Nipissing Crown Game Preserve
- Nopiming Crown Game Preserve
- Pembroke Crown Game Preserve
- Peterborough Crown Game Preserve
- Puslinch Crown Game Preserve
- Shirley's Bay Crown Game Preserve
- Yarmouth Crown Game Preserve
