= Craigmont, Ontario =

Craigmont
- Dispersed rural community Unincorporated area
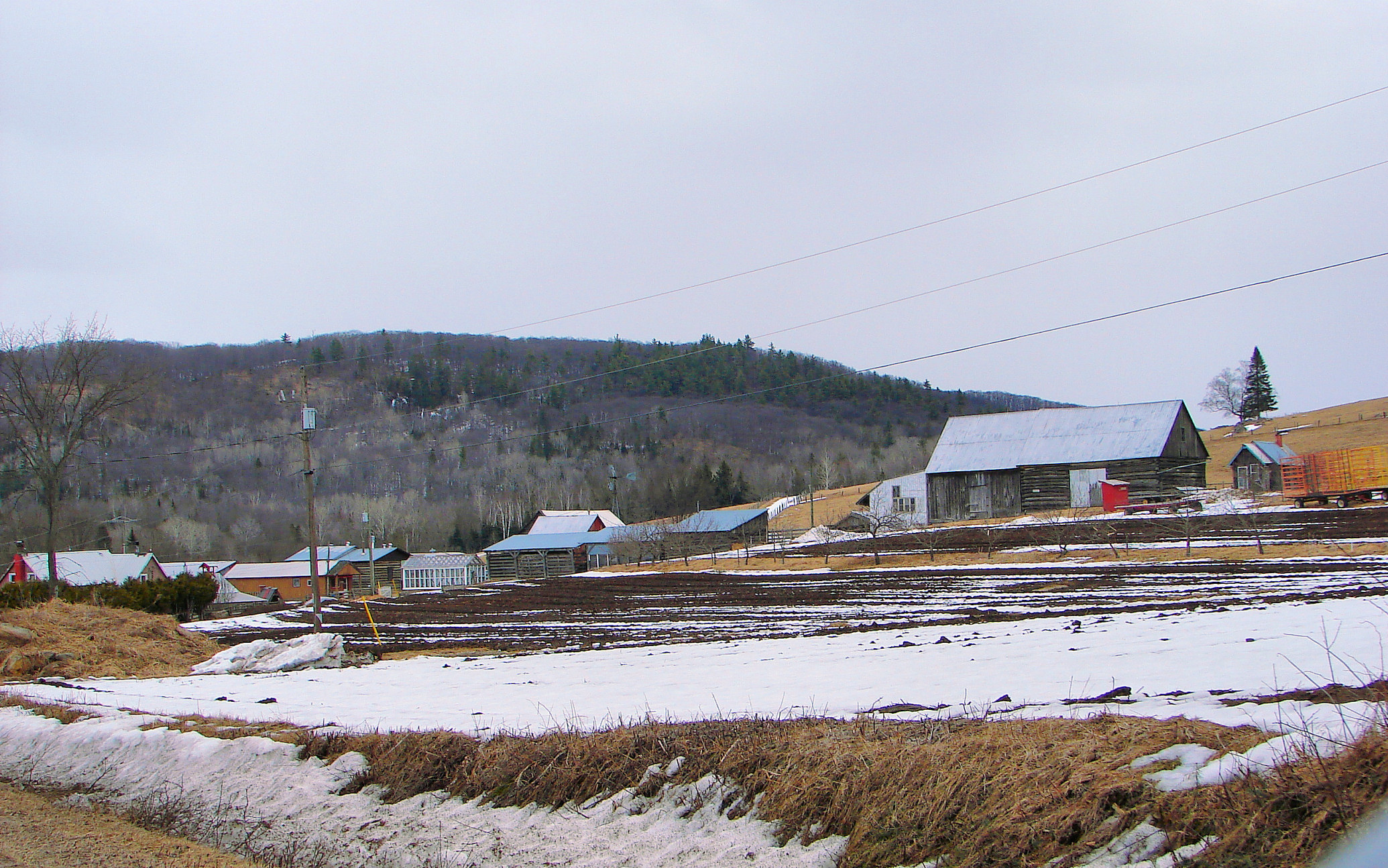
- Craigmont with Mount Robillard in the background

- Location in southern Ontario
- Coordinates: 45°17′45″N 77°38′06″W
- Country: Canada
- Province: Ontario
- County: Hastings
- Municipality: Carlow/Mayo
- Elevation: 338 m (1,109 ft)
- Time zone: UTC-5 (Eastern Time Zone)
  - Summer (DST): UTC-4 (Eastern Time Zone)
- Postal Code: K0L
- Area codes: 613, 343

Craigmont is a dispersed rural community, unincorporated place, and ghost town in Carlow/Mayo, Hastings County in Central Ontario, Canada. It lies adjacent to the municipal boundary with Brudenell, Lyndoch and Raglan in Renfrew County. It was a former mining town that produced corundum from deposits in Mount Robillard, directly north of the community.

In 1876, the mountain was discovered as a source for corundum. In 1900, mining operations began by the Canada Corundum Company. A settlement, consisting of both a company town and a private town, grew to a peak population of 600 persons, making it the world's largest Corundum producer at that time. But in 1913, a fire destroyed the mill, resulting in job loss and a gradual decline. By 1921, Craigmont was a ghost town.

A small community remains along County Road 517 (the former Ontario Highway 517), with some of the original buildings and ruins on private property.
