= Little Mississippi River (Ontario) =

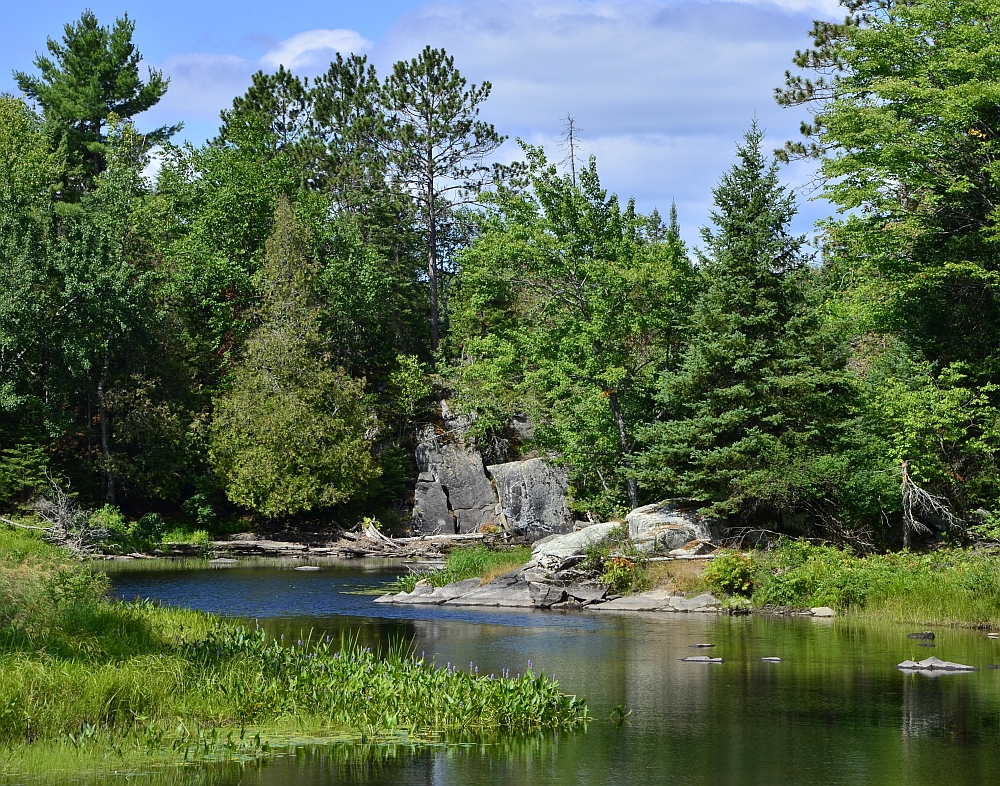
- Little Mississippi River at Hartsmere Road, Addington Highlands, Ontario

Location
- Country: Canada
- Province: Ontario

Physical characteristics
- Source
  - location: Weslemkoon Lake
- Mouth
  - location: York River at
  - coordinates: 45°15′44″N 77°35′17″W
  - elevation: 282 m (925 ft)

The Little Mississippi River is a river in eastern Ontario, Canada. It is the outlet river of Weslemkoon Lake and ends in the York River which in turn empties into the Madawaska River, a tributary of the Ottawa River.

The river joins the York River where it flows through Conroy Marsh, a provincially significant wetland. At one time, this river was used to transport logs out of the pine forests to sawmills located downstream. A number of timber slides were built to transport logs through rapids along the river. Now, the river is used for recreational canoeing.

It is called Little to distinguish it from the larger Mississippi River of Ontario, which is distinct from the much larger Mississippi River in the United States.

== See also ==
- List of Ontario rivers
