= List of rivers of Ontario =

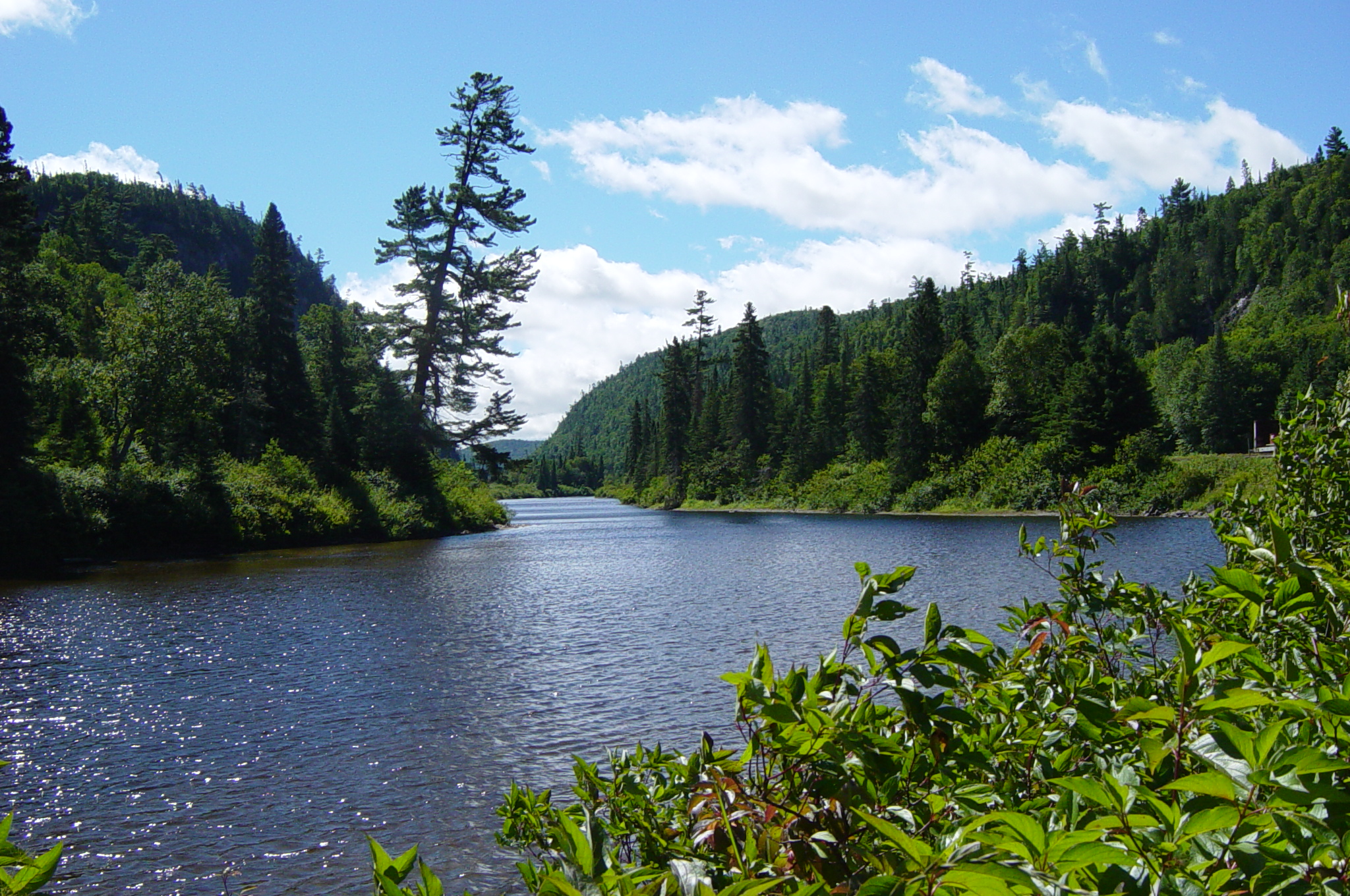
The Agawa River in the Algoma District

This is the list of rivers which are in and flow through Ontario. The watershed list includes tributaries as well. Dee River, flows between Three Mile Lake and Lake Rosseau.

== List of rivers arranged by watershed ==
=== Hudson Bay ===
Hudson Bay – list of rivers by major watershed (west to east)
Nelson River	Hudson Bay	James Bay
Berens River; Whitefish River (Berens River tributary); Bloodvein River; Poplar River; Winnipeg River; Lake of the Woods watershed; Black River; Rainy River; Kaunamaekauk River; Pinewood River; Kishkakoesis River; Pinewood Lake; Sturgeon Creek (or) Sturgeon River; Sleeman Creek; La Vallée River; Rainy Lake; Turtle River; Little Turtle River; Pipestone River; Seine River; Caribou River; Farrington Creek; Cherry River; Manitou River; Manitou Stretch, Lower and Upper Manitou Lake; Peep Bay; Grant Lake; Mosher Bay; McTaggart Creek; MacDonald's Inlet; Big Canoe River, Cuttle Lake; Clement Creek; Alex Creek; Firesteel River; Beaver River; Black Sturgeon River; MacFarlane River; Octopus Creek (Ena Brook); Devils Creek; Whitney Creek; Talbot Creek; Boot Creek; English River; Cedar River; Whitefish Lake; Whitefish River (Lac Seul); Marchington River; Sturgeon River; Sturgeon River; Vermilion River; Wabigoon River; Wapesi River	Echoing River, draining via Gods River and Hayes River in Manitoba; Pasquatchai River; Sturgeon River; Black Duck River; Severn River; Beaver River; Fawn River; Poplar River; Burning River; Pitticow River; Fat River; Otter River; Little Otter River; Sachigo River; Beaver Stone River; Wapaseese River; Thorne River; Sherman River; Morrison River; Rottenfish River; Blackbear River; Makoop River; Windigo River; Fox River; Cobham River; McInness River; Winisk River; Asheweig River; Pipestone River; North Pipestone River; Sutton River (Hudson Bay); Aquatuk River; Warchesku River; Kinushseo River	Lakitusaki River; Opinnagau River; Ekwan River; Little Ekwan River; Crooked River; Matateto River; North Washagami River; Attawapiskat River; Missisa River; Muketei River; Streatfeild River; Attawapiskat Lake; Pineimuta River; Lawashi River; Kapiskau River; Otadaonanis River; Beaver River; Atikameg River; North Wabassie River; Poplar River; Sagesigan River; Little Swan River; Noluskatsi River; Cudmore Creek; Big Willow River; Albany River; Pagashi River; Cheepay River; Henley River; Kenogami River; Little Current River; Kapikotongwa River; Powitik River; Summit Lake (Thunder Bay District); Pagwachuan River; Flint River, Flint Lake; Hinata River; Burrows River, Burrows Lake; Murky Creek; Cotoneaster Lake; Kemogamisis River; Isis Creek; Fecteau Lake; Wintering Lake; Westside Bay; Pout River; Drowning River; Kabinakagami River; Fox River; Nagagami River; Otasawian River; Shekak River; Ogoki River; Allanwater River; Brightsand River; Berg River; Caribou River; Flindt River; Lake St. Joseph; Cat River; Doghole River; Doran River; Miniss River; St. Raphael River; De Lesseps River; Pembina River; Moose River; Kwataboahegan River; Cheepash River; Abitibi River; Frederick House River; Forks River; Night Hawk River; Redstone River (Northeastern Ontario); Whitefish River (Night Hawk Lake); Black River; Whiteclay River; Wolf Creek (Timiskaming District); Woollings Creek; Benoit Creek; Sarsfield Creek; Tomwool Creek; Mattagami River; Kapuskasing River; Saganash River; Little Saganash River; Dunrankin River; East Dunrankin River; Kirkwall River; Nemegosenda River; Borden River; Kapuskasing Lake; Chapleau River; Makonie River; Swanson River; Little Swanson River; Groundhog River; Ivanhoe River; Shawmere River; Little Shawmere River; Nat River; Missinaibi River; Brunswick River; Fire River; Nebotik River; Little Nebotik River; Little Fire River; Greenhill River; South Greenhill River; Hay River; Mattawitchewan River; Albany Forks; Cameron Creek; Oba River, Oba Lake; Pivabiska River; Valentine River; Little Valentine River; Opasatika River; Soweska River; Partridge River; Little Partridge River; Harricana River; Kesagami River; Lawagamau River; Seal River; Little Seal River; Shashiskau River; Little Shashiskau River; Bodell River; Pesekanaskoskau River; Black River; Little Kesagami River; Corner River; Again River (Ontario and Quebec); Little Missisicabi River (Quebec and Ontario); Kattawagami River; Quebec rivers flowing to Ontario (or tributaries of Ontarian rivers). In order, from east to west: Missisicabi River (Quebec); Obamsca River (Quebec); East Missisicabi River (Quebec); West Missisicabi River (Quebec); Harricana River (Quebec and Ontario); Joncas River (Quebec); Turgeon River (Quebec and Ontario); Wawagosic River (Quebec); Detour River (Ontario and Quebec); Garneau River (Ontario and Quebec); Turcotte River (Ontario and Quebec); Little Turcotte River (Ontario); Chabbie River (Ontario and Quebec); Burntbush River (Ontario); North Burntbush River (Ontario); Mikwam River (Ontario); East Mikwam River (Ontario); Little Mikwam River (Ontario); Kabika River (Ontario) (Ontario); Case River (Ontario); Kenning River (Ontario); East Kabika River (Ontario); Patten River (Ontario); South Patten River (Ontario); Little Clive River (Ontario); Boivin River (Quebec); Samson River (Quebec); Plamondon River (Quebec); Malartic River (Quebec); (For other tributaries of Harricana River, see article List of rivers of Quebec) Rivers of Quebec flowing through Ontario (or tributaries of rivers of Ontario) Main rivers of Quebec flowing toward Ontario shores of James Bay, in order, from east to west: Little Missisicabi River; Missisicabi River (Quebec); Obamsca River (Quebec); Missisicabi River East (Quebec); Missisicabi River West (Quebec); Piscapecassy River; Harricana River (Quebec); Joncas River (Quebec); Turgeon River (Quebec); Wawagosic River (Quebec); Detour River (Ontario et Quebec); Patten River (Quebec et Ontario); Burntbush River (Ontario); Boivin River (Quebec); Samson River (Quebec); Plamondon River (Quebec); Malartic River (Quebec); Moose River (Ontario); Abitibi River (Ontario); La Sarre River (Quebec); Duparquet River (Quebec); Dagenais River (Quebec)

=== Atlantic Ocean ===
Atlantic Ocean – list of rivers by major watershed (west to east)
Lake Superior	Lake Huron/Georgian Bay	Lake Erie	Lake Ontario	Saint Lawrence River	Ottawa River
Pigeon River; Arrow River; Pine River; Lomond River; Kaministiquia River; Mission River; McKellar River; Whitefish River; Matawin River; Depot Creek; Shebandowan River; Redhorse River; Bear River; Aguasabon River, Long Lake; Neebing River; McIntyre River; Imogene River; Current River; Wolf River; Black Sturgeon River; Sturgeon River (Black Bay Peninsula); Nipigon Strait, Nipigon Bay, Nipigon River, Lake Helen; Lake Nipigon watershed; Windigo River; Mud River; Ogoki River; Kopka River; Ombabika River, Summit Lake (Thunder Bay District); Namewaminikan River; Foxear Creek; Roslyn River; Ogaman River; Blackwater River; Gull River; Rainy Lake watershed; Rat River; Gravel River; Steel River; Pic River; Black River; Kagiano River; White River; Willow River; Cascade River; Swallow River; Pukaskwa River; Fox River; Julia River; Magpie River; Dog River; Michipicoten River; Old Woman River; Red Rock River; Gargantua River; Baldhead River; Coldwater River; Sand River; Agawa River; Montreal River; Indian River (Algoma District); Harmony River; Chippewa River; Batchawana River; Carp River; Goulais River	Cow Creek; Ausable River; Little Ausable River; Bayfield River; Maitland River; Nine Mile River; Penetangore River; Saugeen River; Teeswater River; Sauble River; Pottawatomi River; Rankin River; Sydenham River; Spey River; Bighead River; Beaver River; Boyne River; Pretty River; Nottawasaga River; Boyne River; Mad River; Pine River; Coldwater River; North River (Ontario); Severn River (part of the Trent-Severn Waterway); Black River (Gloucester Pool); Black River (Severn River tributary); Lake Simcoe watershed; Beaver River; Black River (York Region); Gull River (Balsam Lake); Go Home River; Musquash River; Moon River (Cottage Country); Muskoka River; Indian River; Hollow River; Boyne River; Sixteen Mile Creek; Oxtongue River; Buck River; East River; Seguin River; Boyne River; Magnetawan River; Key River; Pickerel River; Wolf River; French River; Wanapitei River; Pillow River; Murdock River; Wolseley River; Wolf River; Little French River; Restoule River; Hall River; Lake Nipissing watershed; Amateewakea River; Cache River; Sturgeon River; Chiniguchi River; Obabika River; Smoky River; Temagami River; Tomiko River; Poplar River; Little Sturgeon River; Duchesnay River; La Vase River; Wasi River; South River; Whitefish River; Manitou River; Mindemoya River; Kagawong River; Spanish River; Agnes River; Aux Sables River; Vermilion River; Onaping River; Carhess Creek; Depot Creek; Michaud River; Serpent River; Blind River; Mississagi River; Bolton River; Little White River; St. Marys River; Garden River; Bar River	Detroit River; Lake St. Clair watershed; Little River; Pike Creek; Puce River; Belle River; Ruscon River; Thames River; Avon River; Dingman Creek; Jeanettes Creek; McGregor Creek; Medway Creek; Oxbow Creek; Pottersburg Creek; Stoney Creek; Waubuno Creek; Sydenham River; St. Clair River; Big Otter Creek; Little Otter Creek; South Otter Creek; Clear Creek; Long Point Creek; Big Creek; Venison Creek; Deer Creek; Dedrick Creek; Fisherville Creek; Hay Creek; Lynn River; Kent Creek; Davis Creek; Nanticoke Creek; Sandusk Creek; Grand River; Conestogo River; Irvine Creek; Nith River; Speed River; Eramosa River	Niagara River; Lyons Creek; Two Mile Creek; Tea Creek; Niagara Falls; Welland River; Black Creek (Niagara); Coyle Creek; Twelve Mile Creek; Jordan Harbour watershed; Twenty Mile Creek; Red Hill Creek (Hamilton); Burlington Bay watershed; Sulphur Creek; Bronte Creek; Sixteen Mile Creek (Oakville); Credit River; Etobicoke Creek; Spring Creek; Little Etobicoke Creek; Heart Lake (Brampton); Elmcrest Creek (Toronto); North Creek; Jackson Creek; Superior Creek; Mimico Creek; Bonar Creek; Humber River; Black Creek (Toronto); Emerson Creek; Jersey Creek; Rainbow Creek (Vaughan); Robinson Creek (Toronto); West Humber River; East Humber River; Toronto Harbour; Garrison Creek; Springmount Stream; London Stream; Dewson Stream; Asylum Stream; Stafford Stream; Denison Creek; Brock Stream; Havelock Stream; Moutray Stream; Russell Creek; Taddle Creek; Don River; West branch Don River; Castle Frank Brook; Taylor Creek; East Branch Don River; German Mills Creek; Deerlick Creek; Highland Creek; West Highland Creek; Rouge River (Toronto-Pickering); Bruce Creek; Berczy Creek; Beaver Creek; Apple Creek; Petticoat Creek (Pickering); Frenchman's Bay watershed; Amberlea Creek; Dunbarton Creek; Pine Creek; Krosno Creek; Duffins Creek; Miller's Creek; Ganatsekiagon Creek; Brougham Creek; Carruthers Creek; Lynde Creek; Pringle Creek; Corbett Creek; Oshawa Creek; Goodman's Creek; Montgomery Creek (Ontario); Farewell Creek; Harmony Creek; Black Creek (Farewell Creek); Robinson Creek; Tooley Creek; Darlington Creek; West Side Creek; Bowmanville Creek; Soper Creek; Wilmot Creek; Foster Creek; Graham Creek; Port Granby Creek; Brand Creek; Ganaraska River (Port Hope); Salem Creek; Trent River (part of the Trent-Severn Waterway); Crowe River; North River; Rice Lake drainage basin; Indian River; Otonabee River; Kawartha Lakes drainage basin; Burnt River; Drag River; Irondale River; Fenelon River; Gull River; Scugog River; Moira River (Belleville); Clare River; Skootamatta River; Black River; Salmon River; Napanee River; Depot Creek (Napanee River tributary); Millhaven Creek; Little Cataraqui Creek; Cataraqui River (Kingston); Rideau Canal system; Gananoque River	Saint Lawrence River; Raisin River	Blanche River (Lake Timiskaming); Larder River; Laberge River (via Hébert Lake, Buies Lake, Raven Lake, Ward Lake) (Ont. et QC); Dufay River (via Buies Lake, Raven Lake, Ward Lake) (QC); Englehart River; Misema River; Little Misema River; Lillord Creek; Montreal River; Makobe River; Lady Evelyn River; Matabitchuan River; Jocko River; Little Jocko River; Mattawa River; Amable du Fond River; Kaibuskong River; Depot Creek; North River; Chalk River; Petawawa River; Barron River; Depot Creek; Crow River; North River; Little Madawaska River; Nipissing River; Tim River; Muskrat River; Indian River; Bonnechere River; Sherwood River; Pine River; Aylen River; Madawaska River; Opeongo River; York River; Little Mississippi River; North York River; Clyde Creek; South Madawaska River; Galipo River; Crossbar River; North Madawaska River; Mississippi River; Indian River; Clyde River; Little Clyde River; Fall River; Carp River; Rideau River; Sawmill Creek; Jock River; Tay River; Green's Creek; South Nation River; Castor River; North Castor River; Middle Castor River; South Castor River; East Castor River; Little Castor River; Rigaud River; East Rigaud River; Rabbit Creek; Angus Creek; Net Creek; Johnny Creek; Alfreda Creek

== Alphabetical list of rivers ==
A	B	C	D
Agawa River Agnes River Albany River Amable du Fond River Amberlea Creek Aquatuk River Arrow River Asheweig River Asylum Stream Attawapiskat River Ausable River Aux Sables River Avon River	Baldhead River Bar River Barron River Batchawana River Bayfield River Beaver River (Grey County) Beaver River (Kapiskau River tributary) Beaver River (Lake Simcoe) Beaver River (Severn River tributary) Beaver River (Thunder Bay District) Benoit Creek (Ontario) Berens River Big Willow River Bighead River Black Creek (Ontario) Black Creek (Toronto) Black River (Abitibi River tributary) Black River (Bodell River tributary) Black River (Gloucester Pool) Black River (Hastings County) Black River (Kenora District) Black River (Severn River tributary) Black River (Thunder Bay District) Black River (York Region) Black Duck River Black Sturgeon River (Kenora District) Black Sturgeon River (Thunder Bay District) Blind River Bloodvein River Bodell River Bolton River Bonar Creek Bonnechere River Borden River (Ontario) Boyne River (Grey County) Boyne River (Muskoka District) Boyne River (Nottawasaga River tributary) Boyne River (Parry Sound District) Brock Stream Brunswick River Buck River Burning River Burnt River	Cache River Carhess Creek Caribou River (Rainy River District) Caribou River (Thunder Bay District) Carp River Castor River Cat River Cataraqui River Chalk River Chapleau River Cheepash River Cheepay River Chiniguchi River Clare River Clyde River Coldwater River (Algoma District) Coldwater River (Simcoe County) Conestogo River Credit River Crow River Crowe River Cudmore Creek Current River	De Lesseps River Denison Creek Depot Creek (Barron River tributary) Depot Creek (Lake Nosbonsing) Depot Creek (Napanee River tributary) Depot Creek (Sudbury District) Depot Creek (Thunder Bay District) Detroit River Dewson Stream Dog River Doghole River Don River (Toronto) Doran River Dunbarton Creek Dunrankin River
E	F	G	H
East River East Dunrankin River Ekwan River Englehart River English River Eramosa River	Fall River Fat River Fawn River Fenelon River Fire River Firesteel River Forks River Fox River (Cochrane District) Fox River (Kenora District) Fox River (Thunder Bay District) Foxear Creek Frederick House River French River	Gananoque River Ganaraska River Garden River Gargantua River Go Home River Goulais River Grand River Green's Creek Greenhill River Groundhog River Gull River (Balsam Lake) Gull River (Lake Nipigon)	Harricana River Havelock Stream Hay River Holland River Hollow River Humber River Humber River, East Humber River, West
I	J	K	L
Imogene River Indian River (Algoma District) Indian River (Lanark County) Indian River (Muskoka District) Indian River (Muskrat River watershed) Indian River (Rice Lake) Ivanhoe River	Jackson Creek Jessie Creek Jocko River Julia River	Kagawong River Kagiano River Kaministiquia River Kapiskau River Kapuskasing River Kattawagami River Kenogami River Kesagami River Kettle Creek Key River Kinushseo River Kirkwall River Kopka River Krosno Creek Kwataboahegan River	Lady Evelyn River Lakitusaki River Larder River (Ontario) La vase River Lawagamau River Layton River Lillord Creek Little River Little Ausable River Little Fire River Little Jocko River Little Kesagami River Little Misema River Little Mississippi River Little Nebotik River Little Otter River Little Partridge River Little Saganash River Little Seal River Little Shashiskau River Little Shawmere River Little Swan River Little Swanson River Little Valentine River Little White River Lomond River London Stream Lynn River
M	N	O	P
MacFarlane River Mad River Madawaska River Magnetawan River Magpie River Maitland River Makobe River Makonie River Manitou River Maskinonge River Matawin River Matawitchewan River Mattagami River Mattawa River Mattawishkwia River Maxwell Creek McIntyre River McKellar River Michaud River Michipicoten River Mindemoya River Miniss River Misema River Missinaibi River Mission River Missisa River Mississagi River Mississippi River Moira River Montreal River (Algoma–Sudbury, Ontario) Montreal River (Timiskaming District) Moon River (Cottage Country) Moose River Morrison River Moutray Stream Muketei River Muskoka River Musquash River	Namewaminikan River Napanee River Nat River Nebotik River Neebing River Nemegosenda River Niagara River Night Hawk River Nine Mile River Nipigon River Nipissing River Nith River Noisy River Noluskatsi River Nonquon River North Creek North Wabassie River North York River Nottawasaga River	Obabika River Old Woman River Ombabika River Onaping River Opasatika River Opeongo River Opinnagau River Otadaonanis River Otonabee River Otter River Oxtongue River	Pagashi River Penetangore River Pesekanaskoskau River Pembina River Pic River Pickerel River Pigeon River Pine Creek Pine River Pineimuta River Pipestone River Pitticow River Pivabiska River Poplar River (Atikameg River tributary) Poplar River (Fawn River tributary) Poplar River (Manitoba) Poplar River (Nipissing District) Porcupine River Pottawatomi River Pretty River Pukaskwa River
Q	R	S	T
	Rainy River Raisin River Rankin River Redstone River (Northeastern Ontario) Remi River Restoule River Rideau River Rigaud River Roslyn River Rouge River	Sachigo River Saganash River Sagesigan River Saint Lawrence River St. Marys River St. Raphael River Salem Creek Salmon River Sand River Sarsfield Creek Sauble River Saugeen River Schomberg River Scugog River Seal River Seguin River Seine River Serpent River Severn River Shashiskau River Shawmere River Shebandowan River Skootamatta River South Greenhill River South Nation River Soweska River Spanish River Speed River Spey River Springmount Stream Stafford Stream Steel River Streatfeild River Sturgeon River (Black Bay Peninsula) Sturgeon River (Kenora District) Sturgeon River (Lake Nipissing) Sturgeon River (Manitoba) Sturgeon River (Marchington River tributary) Sturgeon River (Simcoe County) Superior Creek Sutton River Swallow River Swanson River Sydenham River	Talbot River Teeswater River Temagami River Thames River (London) Tomwool Creek Trent River Turtle River Twenty Mile Creek
U	V	W	Y
Usiske River	Valentine River Vermilion River (Lac Seul) Vermilion River (Sudbury District)	Wabigoon River Wanapitei River Wapesi River Welland River West Highland Creek Whiteclay River Whitefish River (Berens River tributary) Whitefish River (Lac Seul) Whitefish River (Night Hawk Lake) Whitefish River (Sudbury District) Whitefish River (Thunder Bay District) Winisk River Winnipeg River Wolf Creek (Timiskaming District) Woollings Creek	York River

== See also ==
- List of rivers of Canada
- List of rivers of the Americas
- Hudson Bay drainage basin
- List of lakes of Ontario
- Geography of Ontario
