= Depot Creek =

Depot Creek may refer to:

Canada

- British Columbia
  - Depot Creek (BC-Washington)
- Ontario
  - Depot Creek (Napanee River), in Frontenac County and Lennox and Addington County
  - Nipissing District
    - Depot Creek (Barron River)
    - Depot Creek (Lake Nosbonsing)
  - Depot Creek (Sudbury District)
  - Depot Creek (Thunder Bay District)

United States

- Depot Creek (BC-Washington)
