= Black River (Ontario) =

Black River may refer to several rivers by that name in the province of Ontario, Canada:

- Cochrane District
  - the Black River (Abitibi River), a tributary of the Abitibi River
  - the Black River (Bodell River), a tributary of the Bodell River, itself a tributary of the Kesagami River.
- The Black River (Hastings County) in Hastings County, which joins the Moira River near Tweed, Ontario.
- The Black River (Kenora District) in Kenora District, Ontario, which flows into the Lake of the Woods
- Simcoe County:
  - The Black River in Simcoe County flows south and west from the Haliburton County to the Severn River near Washago, about a mile downstream of the Severn River's source at Lake Couchiching. It is a common misconception that the river flows into Lake Couchiching, which is not the case. This was a problem for lumbermen in the 1860s, who established the Rama Timber Transport Company, to move logs from the Black River to Lake Couchiching. This river is now used for recreational canoeing and kayaking. The Head River is a tributary of this river.
  - The Black River (Gloucester Pool), flows to Gloucester Pool, further downstream on the same Severn River.
- The Black River (Thunder Bay District) flows from headwaters near Manitouwadge, Ontario to join the Pic River near its mouth on Lake Superior south of the town of Marathon, Ontario. There is a small hydroelectric plant on the river operated by the Pic River First Nation. Because, at one time, there were two competing lumber companies in the area, an elevated timber slide was built to divert one company's logs from the Black River over the Pic River, which was used to transport the logs of the other company.
- The Black River (York Region) in the Regional Municipality of York originates in the Oak Ridges Moraine and flows north to Lake Simcoe. Agriculture is the most important use of the land in this river's watershed. In the spring, the water levels are high enough to allow pleasant canoeing and kayaking trips from Sutton. Bird viewing is excellent in April. The water flow is calm enough for beginners and families for canoe trips.

== See also ==
- List of Ontario rivers
