= Seal River =

Seal River may refer to one of several rivers:

Canada

- Seal River (Manitoba), a tributary of Hudson Bay and a Canadian Heritage River
- Seal River (Ontario), a right tributary of the Kesagami River

United States - Alaska

- Seal River (Bering Glacier)
- Seal River (Cook Inlet)

== See also ==
- Little Seal River (Ontario)
