= Whitefish River =

Whitefish River may refer to:

== Canada ==
=== Ontario ===
- Whitefish River (Berens River tributary), in Kenora District
- Whitefish River (Lac Seul), in Kenora District
- Whitefish River (Night Hawk Lake), in Cochrane and Timiskaming Districts
- Whitefish River (Sudbury District)
- Whitefish River (Thunder Bay District)

=== Other rivers in Canada ===
- Whitefish River (Manitoba)
- Whitefish River (Northwest Territories)
- Whitefish River (Saskatchewan)
- Whitefish River (Yukon)

== United States ==
- Whitefish River (Michigan)
- Whitefish River (Montana)

== See also ==
- Laughing Whitefish River, Michigan, U.S.
