= Indian River (Algoma District) =

- Location of the mouth of the river in Ontario

Location
- Country: Canada
- Province: Ontario
- Region: Northeastern Ontario
- District: Algoma

Physical characteristics
- Source: unnamed lake
  - coordinates: 47°28′21″N 84°04′36″W
  - elevation: 462 m (1,516 ft)
- Mouth: Montreal River
  - coordinates: 47°22′51″N 84°00′35″W
  - elevation: 371 m (1,217 ft)
- Length: 12.8 km (8.0 mi)

Basin features
- River system: Great Lakes Basin
- Tributaries
  - right: Hoppy Creek

The Indian River is a river in Algoma District in Northeastern Ontario, Canada. It is in the Great Lakes Basin and is a right tributary of the Montreal River.

== Course ==
The river begins at an unnamed lake. It flows south, then turns west, and takes in the right tributary Hoppy Creek. The river turns southeast, and reaches its mouth at the Montreal River. The Montreal River flows to Lake Superior.

== Tributaries ==
- Hoppy Creek (right)

== See also ==
- List of rivers of Ontario
