= Indian River (Lanark County) =

River in Lanark County in Eastern Ontario, Canada

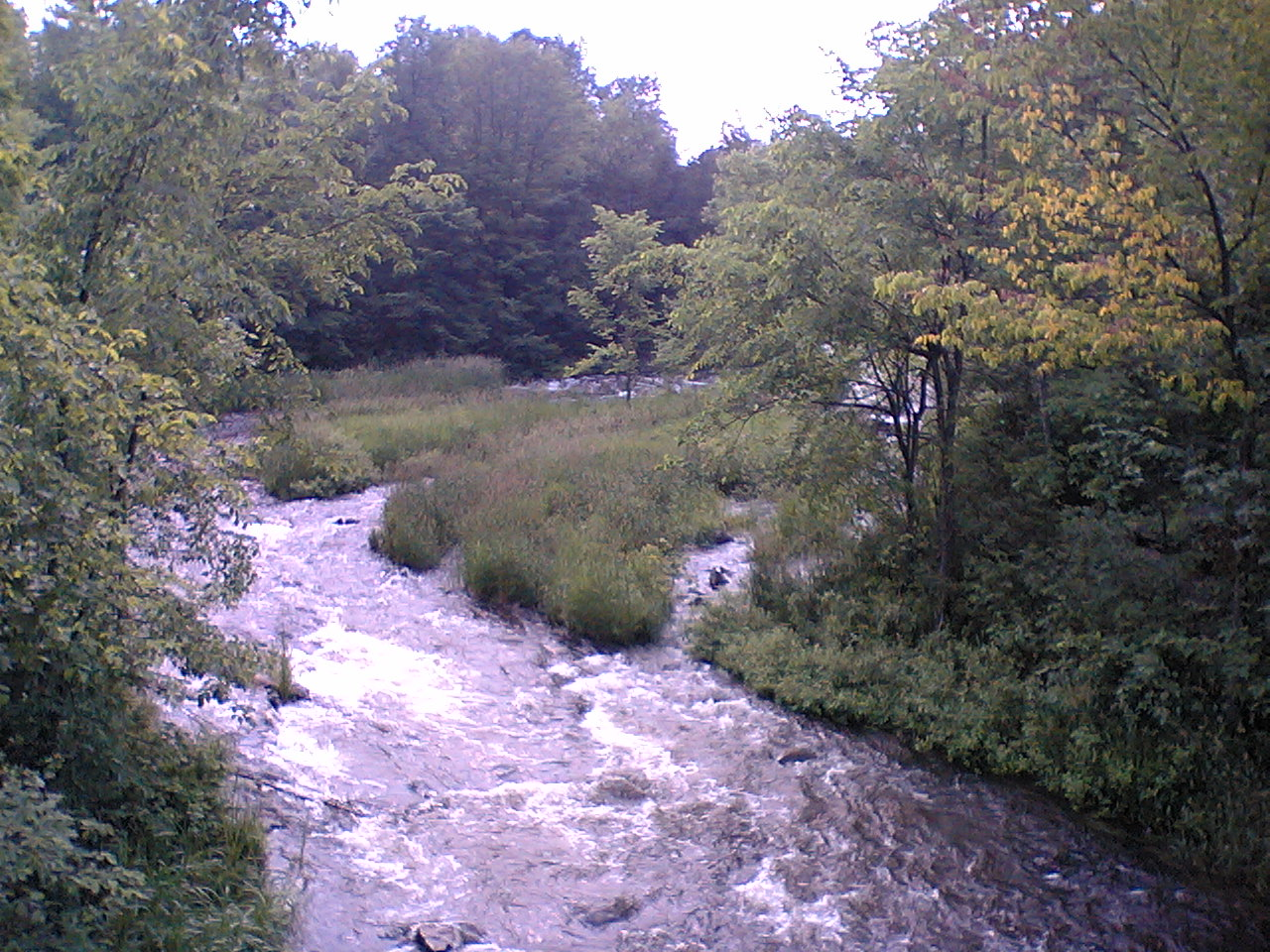
- Indian River at the Mill of Kintail Conservation Area

- Location of the mouth of the river in southern Ontario

Location
- Country: Canada
- Province: Ontario
- Region: Eastern Ontario
- County: Lanark
- Municipalities: Mississippi Mills; Lanark Highlands

Physical characteristics
- Source: Unnamed lake
  - location: Lavant Township, Lanark Highlands
  - coordinates: 45°10′32″N 76°37′07″W
  - elevation: 319 m (1,047 ft)
- Mouth: Mississippi River
  - location: Ramsay Township, Mississippi Mills
  - coordinates: 45°15′24″N 76°14′32″W
  - elevation: 94 m (308 ft)

Basin features
- River system: Saint Lawrence River drainage basin
- Tributaries
  - right: Union Hall Creek

The Indian River is a river in Lanark County in Eastern Ontario, Canada. It is in the Saint Lawrence River drainage basin and is a left tributary of the Mississippi River.

== Course ==
The river begins at an unnamed lake in geographic Lavant Township in the municipality of Lanark Highlands. It flows east into geographic Darling Township, under Lanark County Road 511 near the settlement of White, turns southeast, passes the settlement of Halls Mills on the border of geographic Lanark Township, and reaches Clayton Lake, where it takes in the outflow from Taylor Lake. The river passes into geographic Ramsay Township in the municipality of Mississippi Mills on the lake, and leaves over the Clayton Lake Dam at the settlement of Clayton. It heads northeast, takes in the right tributary Union Hall Creek, and passes through the Mill of Kintail Conservation Area, which has a former grist mill, and a former home of medical doctor, sculptor and Ramsay Township native R. Tait McKenzie. The mill is home to a museum to Mackenzie and to another famous native of Ramsay Township, inventor of basketball James Naismith. The river then reaches its mouth at the Mississippi River, 1.4 kilometres (0.9 mi) upstream of the settlement of Blakeney; the Mississippi flows via the Ottawa River to the Saint Lawerence River.

== Tributaries ==
- Union Hall Creek (right)

== See also ==
- List of rivers of Ontario

== Sources ==
- Map 10 (PDF) (Map). 1 : 700,000. Official road map of Ontario. Ministry of Transportation of Ontario. 2010-01-01.
- Restructured municipalities - Ontario map #5 (Map). Restructuring Maps of Ontario. Ontario Ministry of Municipal Affairs and Housing. 2006. Archived from the original on 2020-05-11.
- "Lanark County". County of Lanark. Archived from the original on 2012-02-08.
- "Map of Lanark County". 1880 Map of Ontario Counties - The Canadian County Atlas Digital Project. McGill University.
