= Willow River =

Willow River may refer to:

== Canada ==
- Willow River (British Columbia), tributary of the Fraser River originating in the Cariboo goldfields, Canada
- Willow River, British Columbia, a community, Canada

== United States ==
- Willow River, Minnesota, a community at the confluence of the Kettle and Willow Rivers, Pine County, U.S.
- Willow River (Kettle River tributary), in Pine County, Minnesota, U.S.
- Willow River (Little Fork River tributary), in Minnesota, U.S.
- Willow River (Mississippi River tributary), in Minnesota, U.S.
- Willow River (St. Croix River tributary), in St. Croix County, Wisconsin, U.S.
- Willow River (Tomahawk River tributary), in Oneida County, Wisconsin, U.S.

== See also ==
- Big Willow River, a tributary of James Bay in Ontario, Canada
- Little Willow River (Mississippi River tributary), in Aitkin County, Minnesota, U.S.
- Hudson, Wisconsin, a city formerly known as "Willow River"
- Willow River State Park, a state park in St. Croix County, Wisconsin, U.S.
