= Mimico Creek =

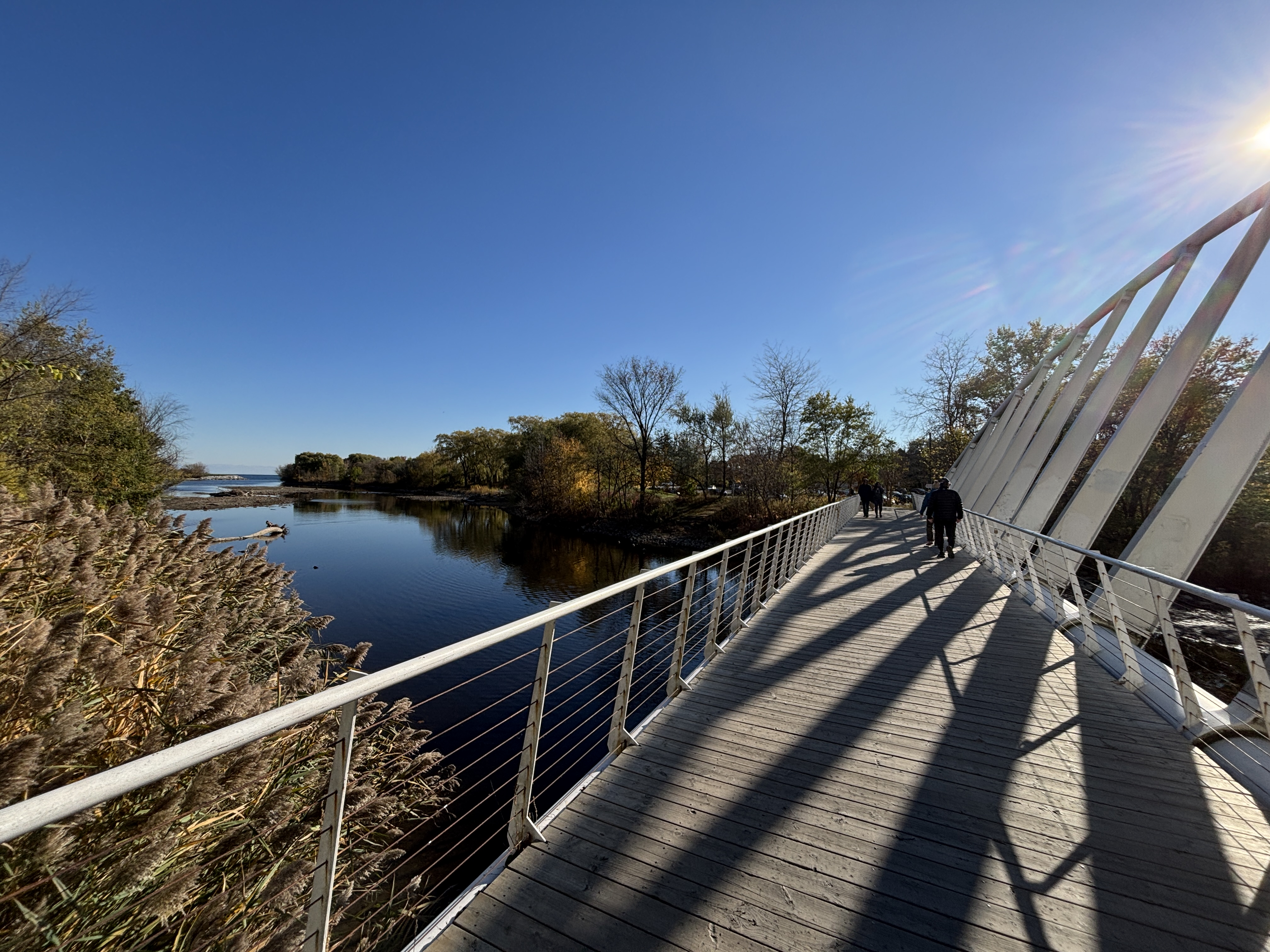
- Mimico Creek near Humber Bay Park

Location
- Country: Canada
- Province: Ontario
- Region: Greater Toronto Area
- Municipalities: Toronto; Mississauga; Brampton

Physical characteristics
- Source
  - location: Brampton
  - coordinates: 43°44′26″N 79°44′06″W
  - elevation: 228 m (748 ft)
- Mouth: Lake Ontario
  - location: Toronto
  - coordinates: 43°37′19″N 79°28′54″W
  - elevation: 74 m (243 ft)
- Length: 33 km (21 mi)
- Basin size: 77 km^{2} (30 sq mi)

Mimico Creek is a stream that flows through Brampton, Mississauga and Toronto in the Greater Toronto Area of Ontario, Canada. It is 33 kilometres (21 mi) long, is in the Great Lakes Basin, and is a tributary of Lake Ontario.

The creek's name is derived from the community of Mimico, which is from the Ojibwe word omiimiikaa meaning "abundant with wild pigeons" (cf. 19th century Mississaugas omiimii, "pigeon"). Previous names included River Mimicoke and Mimicoke Creek.

== Course ==
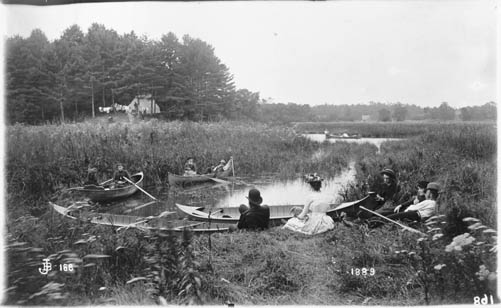
The confluence of Bonar Creek and Mimico Creek, in the marsh where Mimico Creek emptied into Lake Ontario.

The watershed of 77 square kilometres (30 sq mi) lies between the Humber River to the east and Etobicoke Creek to the west.

The creek begins in Brampton, and flows through the community of Malton (now part of Mississauga); it continues southeast, past Toronto Pearson International Airport; and through a shallow valley surrounded by the urban neighbourhoods of Islington and Mimico. The creek is often encased in a concrete spillway to contain the fast flowing water that occurs during rainstorms. Mimico Creek crosses Bloor Street near the Islington Subway Station, and empties into Lake Ontario about 1,000 metres (3,300 ft) west of the mouth of the Humber River.

Originally the creek had dozens of small tributary streams, the largest of which was Bonar Creek, that joined Mimico Creek near its mouth. Most of the tributaries were less than one kilometre long.

== Recreation ==
In the late 1970s and early 1980s, Humber Bay Park was constructed at the mouth of Mimico Creek. The park consists of two headlands, built using landfill from local construction projects that flank the mouth. As a result, Mimico Creek is sometimes mistaken for the Humber River.

== Mimico Creek Bridge ==
In 1994 Mimico Creek Bridge opened to allow pedestrians to access both east and west sections of the park. It is designed by Spanish architect Santiago Calatrava.

== See also ==
- List of rivers of Ontario
