= Black River (Gloucester Pool) =

- Location of the mouth of the Black River in southern Ontario

Location
- Country: Canada
- Province: Ontario
- Region: Central Ontario
- County: Simcoe
- Municipality: Severn

Physical characteristics
- Source: Long Lake
  - elevation: 221 m (725 ft)
- Mouth: Gloucester Pool on the Severn River
  - coordinates: 44°50′42″N 79°42′35″W
  - elevation: 180 m (590 ft)

Basin features
- River system: Great Lakes Basin

The Black River is a river in Simcoe County in Central Ontario, Canada. It is part of the Great Lakes Basin, and is a left tributary of the Severn River.

== Course ==
The river begins at Long Lake in geographic Matchedash Township, and flows to its mouth at Gloucester Pool on the Severn River. The Severn River flows to the Georgian Bay on Lake Huron.

== See also ==
- List of rivers of Ontario
