= Alfreda Creek =

- Location of the mouth of Alfreda Creek in Ontario

Location
- Country: Canada
- Province: Ontario
- Region: Northeastern Ontario
- District: Nipissing
- Municipality: Temagami

Physical characteristics
- Source: Alfreda Lake
  - location: Strathy Township
  - coordinates: 47°6′23″N 79°52′6″W
  - elevation: 300 m (980 ft)
- Mouth: Kanichee Lake
  - location: Strathy Township
  - coordinates: 47°5′53″N 79°50′1″W
  - elevation: 300 m (980 ft)
- Length: 5.7 km (19,000 ft)

Alfreda Creek is a stream in Nipissing District of Northeastern Ontario, Canada. It is in the Ottawa River drainage basin and lies entirely within geographic Strathy Township which lies within the municipal boundaries of Temagami.

The creek has a characteristic U shape and begins at the south end of Alfreda Lake. It heads south for 1.6 km (0.99 mi) where it takes in an unnamed right tributary then flows 1.5 km (0.93 mi) southeastwards. Alfreda Creek then continues northeastwards for about 2.3 km (1.4 mi), supplies a small unnamed lake and flows another 0.30 km (0.19 mi) where it empties into the south arm of Kanichee Lake. The creek has a total length of approximately 5.7 km (3.5 mi).

== See also ==
- List of rivers of Ontario
