= Beaver River (Lake Simcoe) =

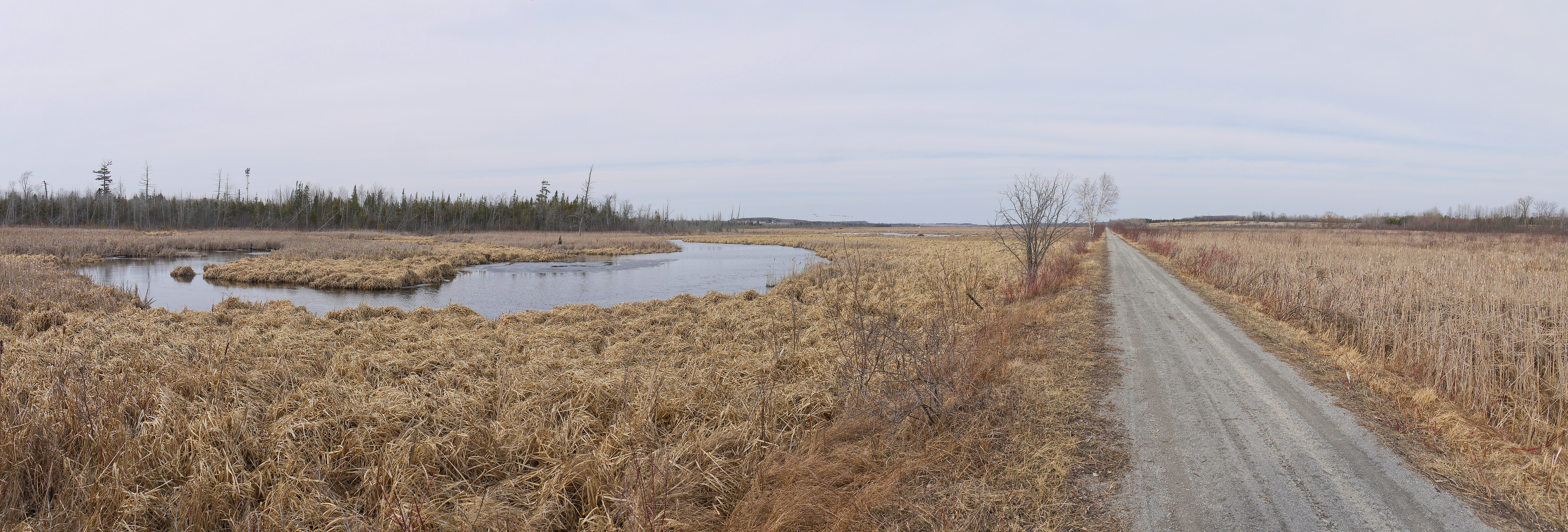
- Beaver River adjacent to the Trans Canada Trail in Scugog

- Location of the mouth of the Beaver River in southern Ontario

Location
- Country: Canada
- Province: Ontario
- Region: Central Ontario
- Regional Municipality: Durham

Physical characteristics
- Source: Unnamed pond
  - location: Scugog
  - coordinates: 44°05′46″N 79°04′39″W
  - elevation: 303 m (994 ft)
- Mouth: Lake Simcoe
  - location: Brock
  - coordinates: 44°25′55″N 79°09′50″W
  - elevation: 219 m (719 ft)
- Basin size: 327.3 km^{2} (126.4 sq mi)
- Discharge
  - location: Beaverton, Ontario
  - average: 2.833 m^{3}/s (100.0 cu ft/s)

Basin features
- River system: Great Lakes Basin

The Beaver River is a river in Durham Region in Central Ontario, Canada. It is part of the Great Lakes Basin, and is a tributary of Lake Simcoe. The river's drainage basin is mostly in Durham Region with the remaining portion in the city of Kawartha Lakes; the entire watershed is under the auspices of the Lake Simcoe Region Conservation Authority.

== Course ==
The river begins at an unnamed pond in Scugog on the Oak Ridges Moraine and heads north, passing briefly through Uxbridge before returning to Scugog. The river continues north and its valley becomes largely marshy, paralleled by the now defunct Toronto and Nipissing Railway line to Coboconk. The river passes under Ontario Highway 12/Ontario Highway 7 and enters Brock. At the community of Cannington, the river turns northwest and reaches its mouth at Lake Simcoe at the community of Beaverton.

== Tributaries ==
- Vrooman Creek (left)

== See also ==
- List of rivers of Ontario

== Sources ==
- Map 5 (PDF) (Map). 1 : 700,000. Official road map of Ontario. Ministry of Transportation of Ontario. 2010-01-01.
- Restructured municipalities - Ontario map #6 (Map). Restructuring Maps of Ontario. Ontario Ministry of Municipal Affairs and Housing. 2006. Archived from the original on 2021-02-24.
