= Jessie Creek =

Jessie Creek may refer to:

- Jessie Creek (Nipissing District), a stream in Northeastern Ontario
- Jessie Creek Winery, a winery in New Jersey
