= Go Home River =

- Location of the mouth of the Go Home River in Ontario

Location
- Country: Canada
- Province: Ontario
- Region: Central Ontario
- District: District Municipality of Muskoka
- Municipality: Georgian Bay

Physical characteristics
- Source: Go Home Lake
  - coordinates: 45°00′55″N 79°53′09″W
  - elevation: 185 m (607 ft)
- Mouth: Bushby Inlet, Georgian Bay, Lake Huron
  - coordinates: 45°00′14″N 79°55′05″W
  - elevation: 176 m (577 ft)
- Length: 2.85 km (1.77 mi)

Basin features
- River system: Great Lakes Basin

The Go Home River is a river in the municipality of Georgian Bay, District Municipality of Muskoka in Central Ontario, Canada. It is part of the Great Lakes Basin and lies in geographic Gibson Township. The river flows west, over a dam, from Go Home Lake to empty into Bushby Inlet, on Georgian Bay, Lake Huron. The settlement of Go Home is located about 1.2 kilometres (0.7 mi) further west of the river's mouth.

The river's name comes from the Ojibwa name for this river which means "direct route home".

== See also ==
- List of rivers of Ontario

== Sources ==
- Map 5 (PDF) (Map). 1 : 700,000. Official road map of Ontario. Ministry of Transportation of Ontario. 2010-01-01.
- Restructured municipalities - Ontario map #4 (Map). Restructuring Maps of Ontario. Ontario Ministry of Municipal Affairs and Housing. 2006. Archived from the original on 2014-04-10.
