= Wolf River (Thunder Bay District) =

- Location of the mouth of the Wolf River in Ontario

Location
- Country: Canada
- Province: Ontario
- Region: Northwestern Ontario
- District: Thunder Bay District

Physical characteristics
- Source: Upper Wolf Lake
  - coordinates: 48°56′49″N 88°58′40″W
  - elevation: 428 m (1,404 ft)
- Mouth: Lake Superior
  - coordinates: 48°49′02″N 88°29′09″W
  - elevation: 183 m (600 ft)

Basin features
- River system: Great Lakes Basin

The Wolf River is a river in Thunder Bay District in Northwestern Ontario, Canada. It is in the Great Lakes Basin and is a tributary Lake Superior.

== Course ==
The river begins at Upper Wolf Lake in geographic Glen Township and heads east to Upper Clearwater Lake. It turns southeast through Lower Clearwater Lake, then east, northeast and once again southeast to Wolf Lake. It passes southeast out of the lake over a weir dam and enters the municipality of Dorion, heads under Ontario Highway 17/Ontario Highway 11 (at this point part of the Trans-Canada Highway) and the Canadian Pacific Railway transcontinental main line, and reaches Black Bay on Lake Superior.

== Tributaries ==
- Cavern Creek (right)
- Wolfpup Creek (left)
- Unknown Creek (left)
- Moraine Creek (left)
- Furcate Creek (right)
- Springlet Creek (left)
- Greenwich Creek (right)
- Hickey Creek (right)

== See also ==
- List of rivers of Ontario

== Sources ==
- Map 13 (PDF) (Map). 1 : 1,600,000. Official road map of Ontario. Ministry of Transportation of Ontario. January 1, 2010.
- Restructured municipalities - Ontario map #2 (Map). Restructuring Maps of Ontario. Ontario Ministry of Municipal Affairs and Housing. 2006. Archived from the original on April 10, 2014.
