= Sturgeon River (Black Bay Peninsula) =

- Location of the mouth of the Sturgeon River in Ontario

Location
- Country: Canada
- Province: Ontario
- Region: Northwestern Ontario
- District: Thunder Bay District

Physical characteristics
- Source
  - coordinates: 48°37′32″N 88°21′48″W
  - elevation: 244 m (801 ft)
- Mouth: Lake Superior
  - coordinates: 48°34′20″N 88°24′56″W
  - elevation: 180 m (590 ft)
- Length: 9.7 km (6.0 mi)

The Sturgeon River is a short river in Thunder Bay District in Northwestern Ontario, Canada. It is located on the Black Bay Peninsula about 30 kilometres (19 mi) south of the community of Hurkett and flows to Sturgeon Bay on Lake Superior.

The similarly named Black Sturgeon River in the area flows to Black Bay, a bay separated from Lake Superior by the Black Bay Peninsula.

== See also ==
- List of rivers of Ontario
