= Indian River (Rice Lake) =

- Location of the mouth of the river in southern Ontario

Location
- Country: Canada
- Province: Ontario
- Region: Central Ontario
- County: Peterborough
- Municipalities: Otonabee – South Monaghan; Douro-Dummer

Physical characteristics
- Source: Stony Lake
  - location: Douro-Dummer
  - coordinates: 44°32′28″N 78°05′43″W
  - elevation: 234 m (768 ft)
- Mouth: Rice Lake
  - location: Otonabee – South Monaghan
  - coordinates: 44°13′35″N 78°08′27″W
  - elevation: 187 m (614 ft)
- Length: 43 km (27 mi)
- Basin size: 210 km^{2} (81 sq mi)

Basin features
- River system: Great Lakes Basin
- Tributaries
  - right: May's Creek

The Indian River is a river in Peterborough County in Central Ontario, Canada. It is in the Great Lakes Basin, and is a tributary of Rice Lake.

== Course ==
The river begins at Stony Lake in the municipality of Douro-Dummer. It exits the lake at Gilchrist Bay (and the settlement of Gilchrist Bay)) over Gilchrist Bay Dam and heads southwest. It flows through Tilley's Hole and through the Warsaw Caves Conservation Area, where a short portion of the watercourse flows underground. It passes the community of Warsaw, and takes in the right tributary May's Creek. The river continues southwest into the municipality of Otonabee – South Monaghan, and passes under the Kawartha Lakes Railway and then under Ontario Highway 7. The Indian River continues south, through the Hope Mill Conservation Area and Lang Pioneer Village at the community of Lang, flows through the community of Keene, and reaches its mouth at Rice Lake, which flows via the Trent River to Lake Ontario.

== Watershed ==
The Indian River drainage basin encompasses 210 square kilometres (81 sq mi) of land in two physiographic regions: the Peterborough Drumlin Field and Dummer Moraine.

== Tributaries ==
- May's Creek (right)

== See also ==
- List of rivers of Ontario

== Sources ==
- Map 6 (PDF) (Map). 1 : 700,000. Official road map of Ontario. Ministry of Transportation of Ontario. 2010-01-01.
- Restructured municipalities - Ontario map #5 (Map). Restructuring Maps of Ontario. Ontario Ministry of Municipal Affairs and Housing. 2006. Archived from the original on 2020-05-11.
