= Salmon River (Ontario) =

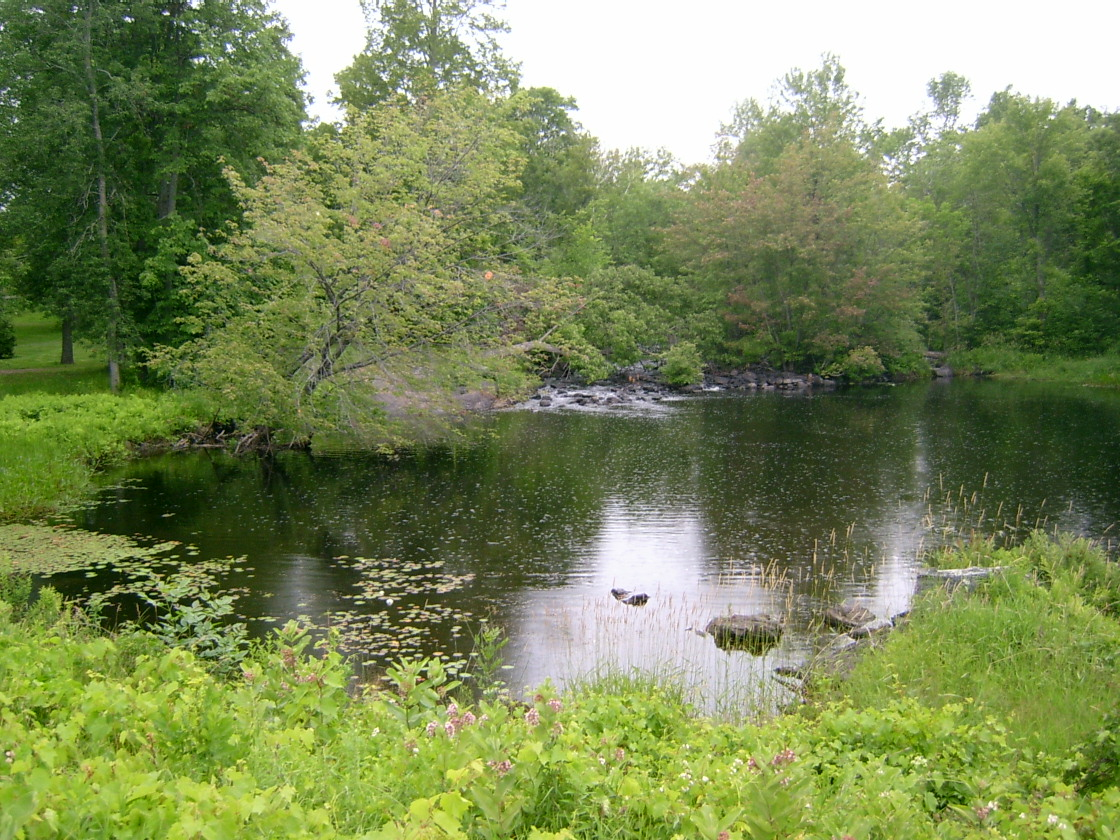
- Salmon River in Ontario along Highway 7

- Location of the mouth of the Salmon River in southern Ontario

Location
- Country: Canada
- Province: Ontario
- Region: Central Ontario; Eastern Ontario
- Counties: Hastings; Lennox and Addington; Frontenac

Physical characteristics
- Source: Kennebec Lake
  - location: Central Frontenac, Frontenac County
  - coordinates: 44°44′00″N 76°57′51″W
  - elevation: 198 m (650 ft)
- Mouth: Lake Ontario
  - location: Tyendinaga, Hastings County
  - coordinates: 44°10′37″N 77°15′03″W
  - elevation: 75 m (246 ft)
- Length: 75 km (47 mi)

Basin features
- River system: Great Lakes Basin

The Salmon River is a river in Ontario, Canada. The river flows 135 kilometres (84 mi) south from about 200 metres south of Mazinaw Lake into Kennebec Lake near the community of Arden, part of Central Frontenac, Frontenac County, through a chain of small lakes and through part of Lennox and Addington County to the Bay of Quinte on Lake Ontario near the community of Shannonville, part of Tyendinaga, Hastings County. The watershed is about 227,579 acres (92,100 hectares) of which 65,524 acres is forested.

== See also ==
- List of rivers of Ontario
