= Wolf River (Parry Sound District) =

- Location of the mouth of the Wolf River in Ontario

Location
- Country: Canada
- Province: Ontario
- Region: Central Ontario
- District: Parry Sound District

Physical characteristics
- Source: Halfpenny Lake
  - location: Pringle Township
  - coordinates: 45°54′16″N 79°45′51″W
  - elevation: 272 m (892 ft)
- Mouth: Dollars Lake on the Pickerel River
  - coordinates: 45°58′30″N 80°08′19″W
  - elevation: 206 m (676 ft)

Basin features
- River system: Great Lakes Basin

The Wolf River is a river in Parry Sound District in Central Ontario, Canada. It is in the Great Lakes Basin and is a right tributary of the Pickerel River.

== Course ==
The river begins at Halfpenny Lake in geographic Pringle Township and heads northwest, passes under Ontario Highway 522 near the community of Golden Valley, then continues northwest almost in a straight line through geographic East Mills Township, geographic Hardy Township, and geographic McConkey Township, where it passes over Pine Lake Dam and reaches its mouth at Dollars Lake on the Pickerel River. The Pickerel flows via the French River to Georgian Bay on Lake Huron.

== See also ==
- List of rivers of Ontario

== Sources ==
- Map 8 (PDF) (Map). 1 : 700,000. Official road map of Ontario. Ministry of Transportation of Ontario. 2010-01-01.
- Restructured municipalities - Ontario map #4 (Map). Restructuring Maps of Ontario. Ontario Ministry of Municipal Affairs and Housing. 2006. Archived from the original on 2014-04-10.
