= Sand River (Ontario) =

Sand River Rivière Sand (in French)
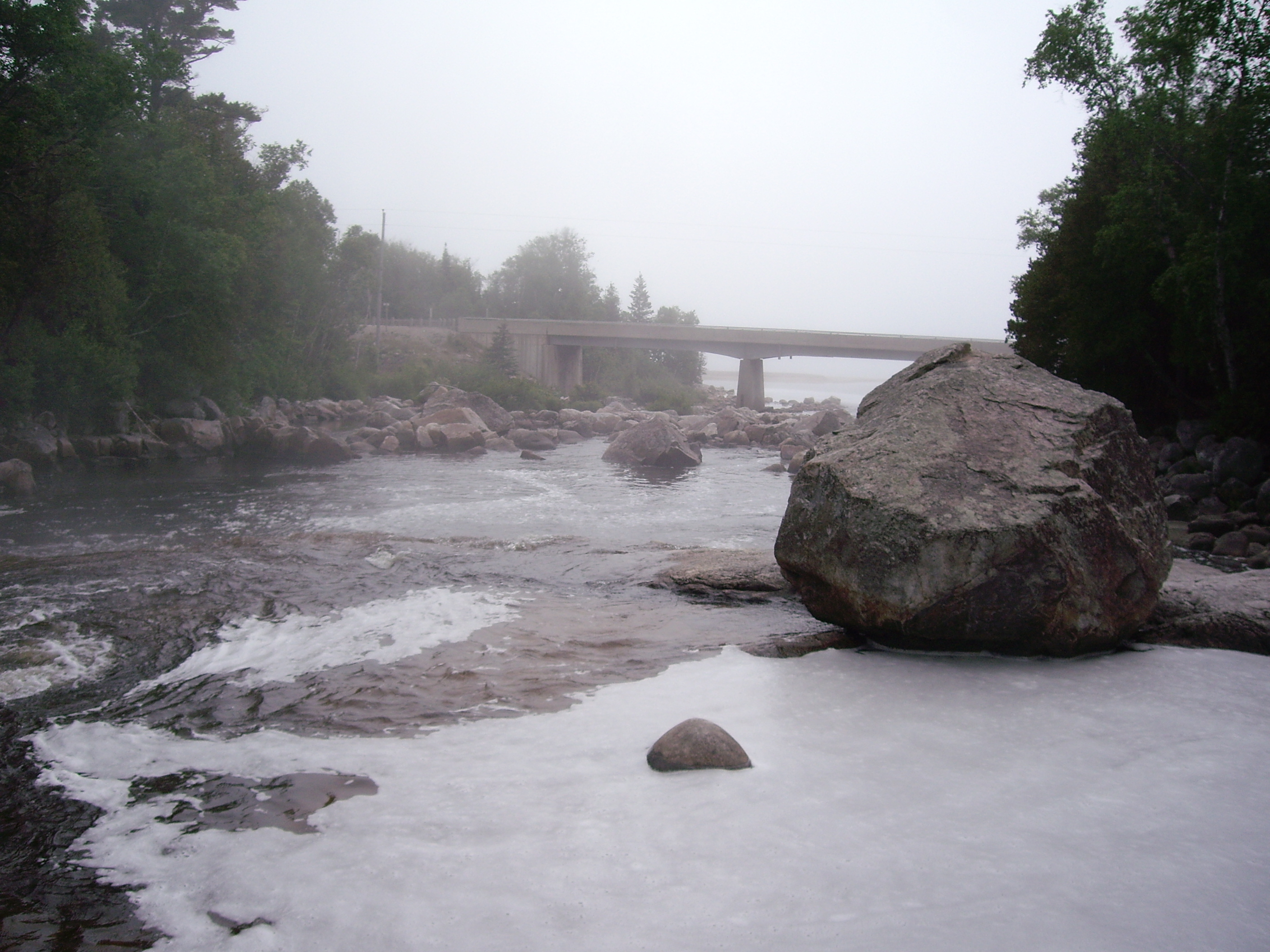
- Looking downstream to Ontario Highway 17 bridge and the river mouth

- Location of the mouth of the Sand River in Ontario.
- Etymology: named after the sand bar formed across its mouth.
- Native name: Pinguisibi (Ojibwe)

Location
- Country: Canada
- Province: Ontario
- Region: Northeastern Ontario
- District: Algoma
- Part: Algoma, Unorganized, North

Physical characteristics
- Source: Sand Lake
  - location: Stoney Township
  - coordinates: 47°41′56″N 84°33′10″W
  - elevation: 375 m (1,230 ft)
- Mouth: Lake Superior
  - location: Goodwillie Township
  - coordinates: 47°25′58″N 84°43′50″W
  - elevation: 180 m (590 ft)

Basin features
- River system: Great Lakes Basin
- Tributaries
  - left: Kwagama Creek

The Sand River (French: Rivière Sand) is a river in the Unorganized North Part of Algoma District in Northeastern Ontario, Canada. It is in the Great Lakes Basin, is a tributary of Lake Superior, and its entire course lies within Lake Superior Provincial Park.

The river is named after the sand bar formed across its mouth. The Ojibway name for the river is Pinguisibi, where pingui means fine white sand and sibi means river.

== Course ==
The Sand River begins at Sand Lake, in geographic Stoney Township, on which is located the railway point of Sand Lake on the Algoma Central Railway. It leaves the lake South over Sand Lake Dam about 4.4 kilometres (2.7 mi) west of the community of Millwood. It travels South into geographic Barnes Township, geographic Barager Township, and geographic Broome Township, the latter in which it heads over Calwin Falls. The river continues south into geographic Goodwillie Township, flows over Lady Evelyn Falls, and takes in the left tributary Kwagama Creek. It then heads southwest, descends a series of low cascades, passes under Ontario Highway 17 and reaches its mouth at Lake Superior.

== Recreation ==
The entire river is a designated canoe route. There is a picnic area at the mouth of the river next to Highway 17 where many travelers stop to enjoy a view of the cascading falls, and the Pinguisibi hiking trail follows the right bank from the river mouth.

== Tributaries ==
- Kwagama Creek
- Sand Lake
  - Sand Creek
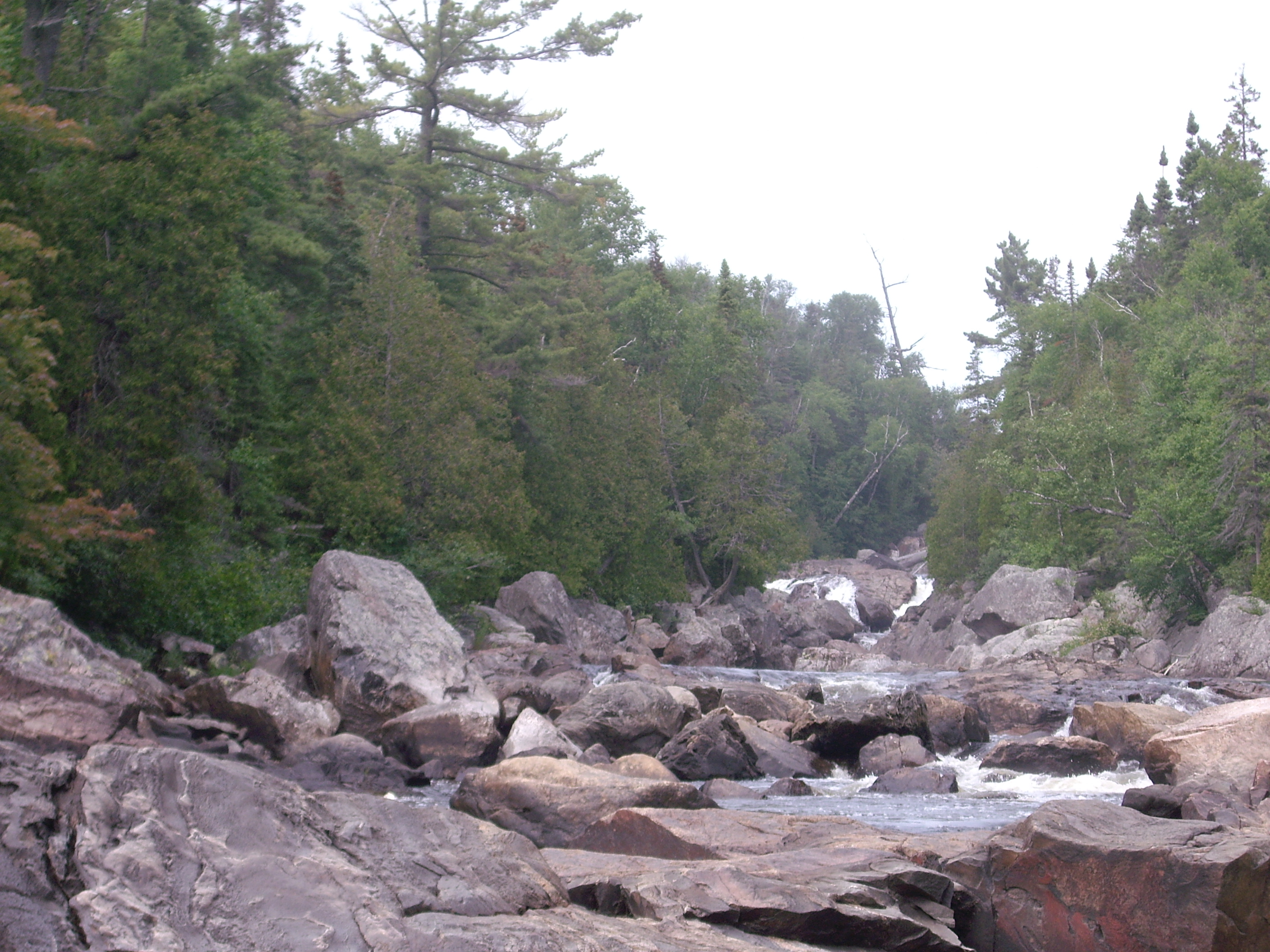
Sand River Looking Upstream near Lake Superior

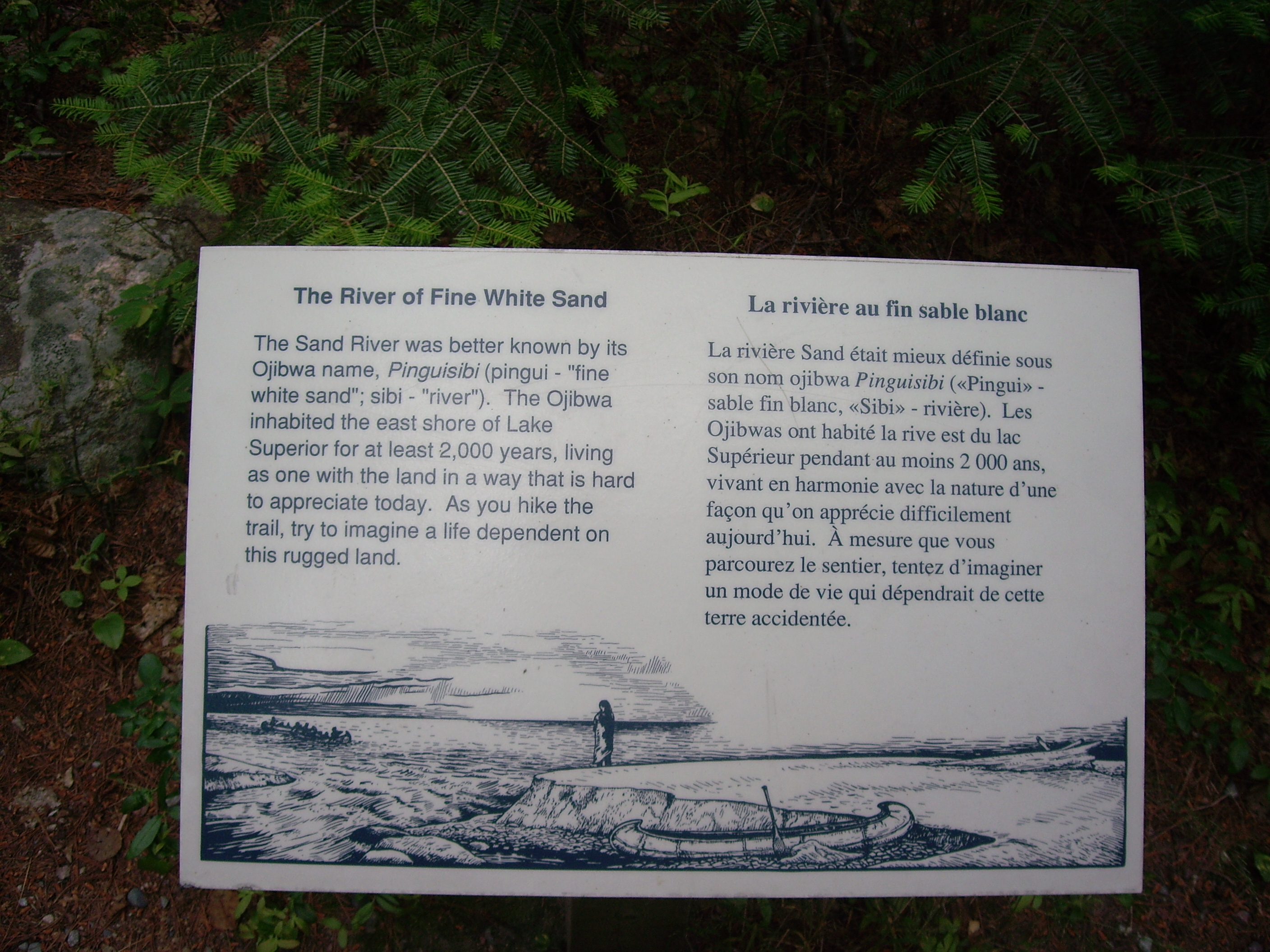
Historical Sign on the Bank of the River

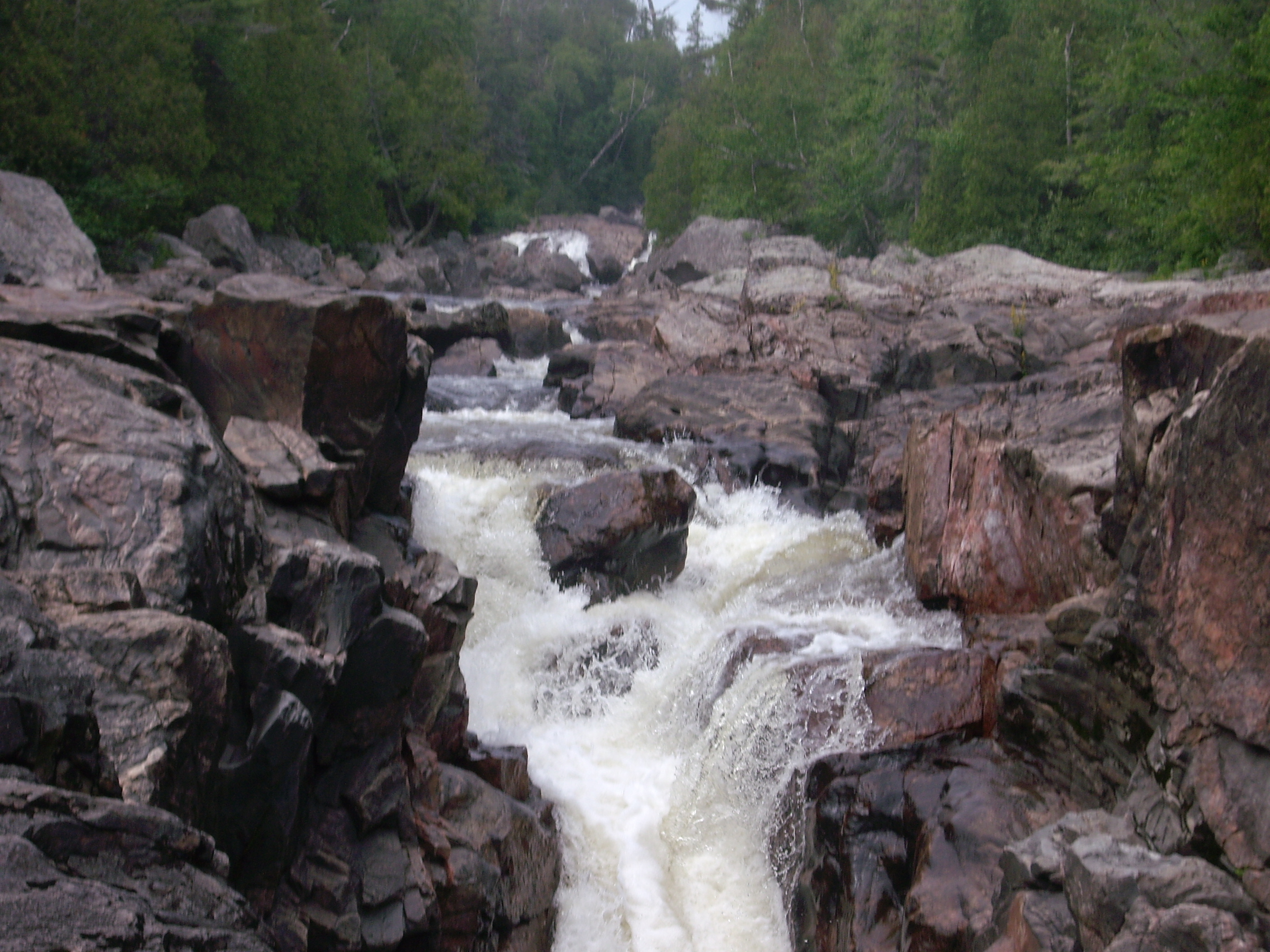
Sand River water cascades looking upstream

== See also ==
- List of rivers of Ontario
