= Fox River (Kenora District) =

- Location of the mouth of the Fox River in Ontario

Location
- Country: Canada
- Province: Ontario
- Region: Northwestern Ontario
- District: Kenora

Physical characteristics
- Source: Marugg lake
  - coordinates: 52°53′07″N 92°34′14″W
  - elevation: 306 m (1,004 ft)
- Mouth: Severn River
  - coordinates: 52°12′01″N 92°06′33″W
  - elevation: 268 m (879 ft)

Basin features
- River system: Hudson Bay drainage basin
- Tributaries
  - right: Nekence Creek

The Fox River is a river in Kenora District in Northwestern Ontario, Canada. It is in the Hudson Bay drainage basin and is a right tributary of the Severn River.

The river begins at Marugg Lake and flows northeast to its mouth at Fox Bay on the Severn River, about 30 kilometres (19 mi) southwest of the First Nations community of Muskrat Dam. The Severn River flows to Hudson Bay.

== See also ==
- List of rivers of Ontario

== Sources ==
- Map 16 (PDF) (Map). 1 : 1,600,000. Official road map of Ontario. Ministry of Transportation of Ontario. 2014.
- Map 18 (PDF) (Map). 1 : 1,600,000. Official road map of Ontario. Ministry of Transportation of Ontario. 2014.
