= Old Woman River (Ontario) =

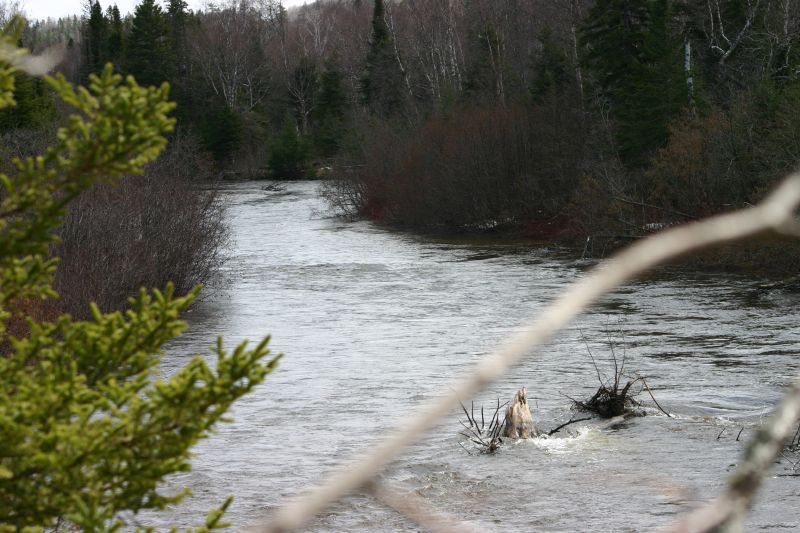

- Location within Ontario

Location
- Country: Canada
- Province: Ontario
- District: Algoma

Physical characteristics
- Mouth: Old Woman Bay (Lake Superior)
  - location: Unorg. North Algoma
  - coordinates: 47°47′08″N 84°53′45″W
  - elevation: 183 m (600 ft)

Basin features
- Tributaries
  - left: South Old Woman River

The Old Woman River is a river in Algoma District of Ontario, Canada, which empties into Old Woman Bay on Lake Superior south of Wawa. It flows through Lake Superior Provincial Park.

The river follows a fault which became a spillway for glacial meltwater following the last ice age. The river's valley has extensive deposits of sand and gravel. At its mouth, the river bends sharply behind a beach berm, that has formed as a result of prevailing westerly winds, which in turn causes lake waves to dam the river's mouth with sand.

Towering cliffs along the bay have been home to peregrine falcons.

The name for the bay and river come from a rock formation near the river's mouth that resembles the face of an old woman.

== See also ==
- List of Ontario rivers
