= Agnes River (Spanish River tributary) =

- Location of the mouth of the Agnes River in Ontario

Location
- Country: Canada
- Province: Ontario
- Region: Northeastern Ontario
- District: Sudbury District
- Municipality: Unorganized Sudbury

Physical characteristics
- Source: Sinaminda Lake
  - coordinates: 46°50′27″N 81°56′27″W
  - elevation: 406 m (1,332 ft)
- Mouth: Spanish River
  - coordinates: 46°39′29″N 81°46′22″W
  - elevation: 304 m (997 ft)
- Length: 30 km (19 mi)

Basin features
- River system: Lake Huron drainage basin
- Tributaries
  - right: Shakwa River

The Agnes River is a river in the Lake Huron drainage basin in Unorganized Sudbury District in Northeastern Ontario, Canada.

The river begins at an Sinaminda Lake and flows southeast to its mouth at the Spanish River, which flows to the North Channel on Lake Huron. The outflow from Sinaminda Lake is controlled by the Sinaminda Dam, owned by Domtar; water from the lake reservoir is used to provide a regulated flow to hydroelectric generating stations owned by Vale Inco further downstream on the Spanish River. The mouth of river is a glacially-formed fluvial delta.

A stand of old-growth forest called the Agnes River Old Pine is located in the Agnes River drainage basin.

== Tributaries ==
- Shakwa River (right)

== See also ==
- List of rivers of Ontario
