= Pagashi River =

- Location of the river mouth in Ontario

Location
- Country: Canada
- Province: Ontario
- Region: Northwestern Ontario
- District: Kenora

Physical characteristics
- Source: Unnamed lake
  - coordinates: 51°27′15″N 84°07′08″W
  - elevation: 103 m (338 ft)
- Mouth: Albany River
  - coordinates: 51°39′43″N 83°14′16″W
  - elevation: 50 m (160 ft)

Basin features
- River system: James Bay drainage basin

The Pagashi River is a river in northeastern Kenora District in northwestern Ontario, Canada. It is in the James Bay drainage basin and is a left tributary of the Albany River.

The Pagashi River begins at an unnamed lake and flows northeast to its mouth at the Albany River, which flows to James Bay.

== Sources ==
- Map 18 (PDF) (Map). 1 : 1,600,000. Official road map of Ontario. Ministry of Transportation of Ontario. 2014.
