= Nine Mile River (Ontario) =

Watercourse in Ontario, Canada

Coordinates: 43.87503°N 81.70096°W

The Nine Mile River is a river in the Maitland Valley of southern Ontario, Canada, which flows through the village of Lucknow and empties into Lake Huron at Port Albert.

== See also ==
- List of rivers of Ontario
