= Sutton River (Hudson Bay) =

Location
- Country: Canada
- Province: Ontario
- Region: Kenora District

Physical characteristics
- Source: Lake Sutton
  - location: Kenora District
  - coordinates: 54°35′32″N 84°36′58″W
  - elevation: 140 m (460 ft)
- Mouth: Hudson Bay
  - location: Kenora District
  - coordinates: 55°13′42″N 83°41′21″W
  - elevation: 0 m (0 ft)

Basin features
- Tributaries
  - left: unidentified stream.
  - right: (Upstream) Aquatuk River, Warchesku River

The Sutton River is a tributary of the south shore of Hudson Bay, crossing the Kenora District, Northwestern Ontario, Canada.

This watercourse rises at the mouth of Lake Sutton. From there, the current crosses the "Sutton Narrows", then Lake Hawley. The course of the river crosses large areas of marshland.

This river has two main tributaries: Aquatuk River, Warchesku River.

== See also ==
- Kenora District, an administrative region of Ontario
- Hudson Bay
- Aquatuk River
- Warchesku River
- Polar Bear Provincial Park
- List of rivers of Ontario
