= Depot Creek (Sudbury District) =

- Location of the mouth of Depot Creek in Ontario

Location
- Country: Canada
- Province: Ontario
- Region: Northeastern Ontario
- District: Sudbury

Physical characteristics
- Source: Depot Lake
  - location: Hess Township
  - coordinates: 46°44′55″N 81°30′04″W
  - elevation: 424 m (1,391 ft)
- Mouth: Carhess Creek
  - location: Cartier Township
  - coordinates: 46°42′47″N 81°29′03″W
  - elevation: 412 m (1,352 ft)

Basin features
- River system: Great Lakes Basin

Depot Creek is a river in Sudbury District in Northeastern Ontario, Canada, near the community of Cartier. It is in the Great Lakes Basin and is a left tributary of Carhess Creek.

The creek begins at Depot Lake in geographic Hess Township, flows south through Paddy's Lake into geographic Cartier Township, and reaches its mouth at Carhess Creek. Carhess Creek flows via the Onaping River, the Vermilion River and the Spanish River to Lake Huron.

== See also ==
- List of rivers of Ontario

== Sources ==
- Map 6 (PDF) (Map). 1 : 700,000. Official road map of Ontario. Ministry of Transportation of Ontario. 2014.
- Restructured municipalities - Ontario map #4 (Map). Restructuring Maps of Ontario. Ontario Ministry of Municipal Affairs and Housing. 2006. Archived from the original on 2014-04-10.
