= Gargantua River =

River in Ontario, Canada

Coordinates: 47°35′21″N 85°00′21″W

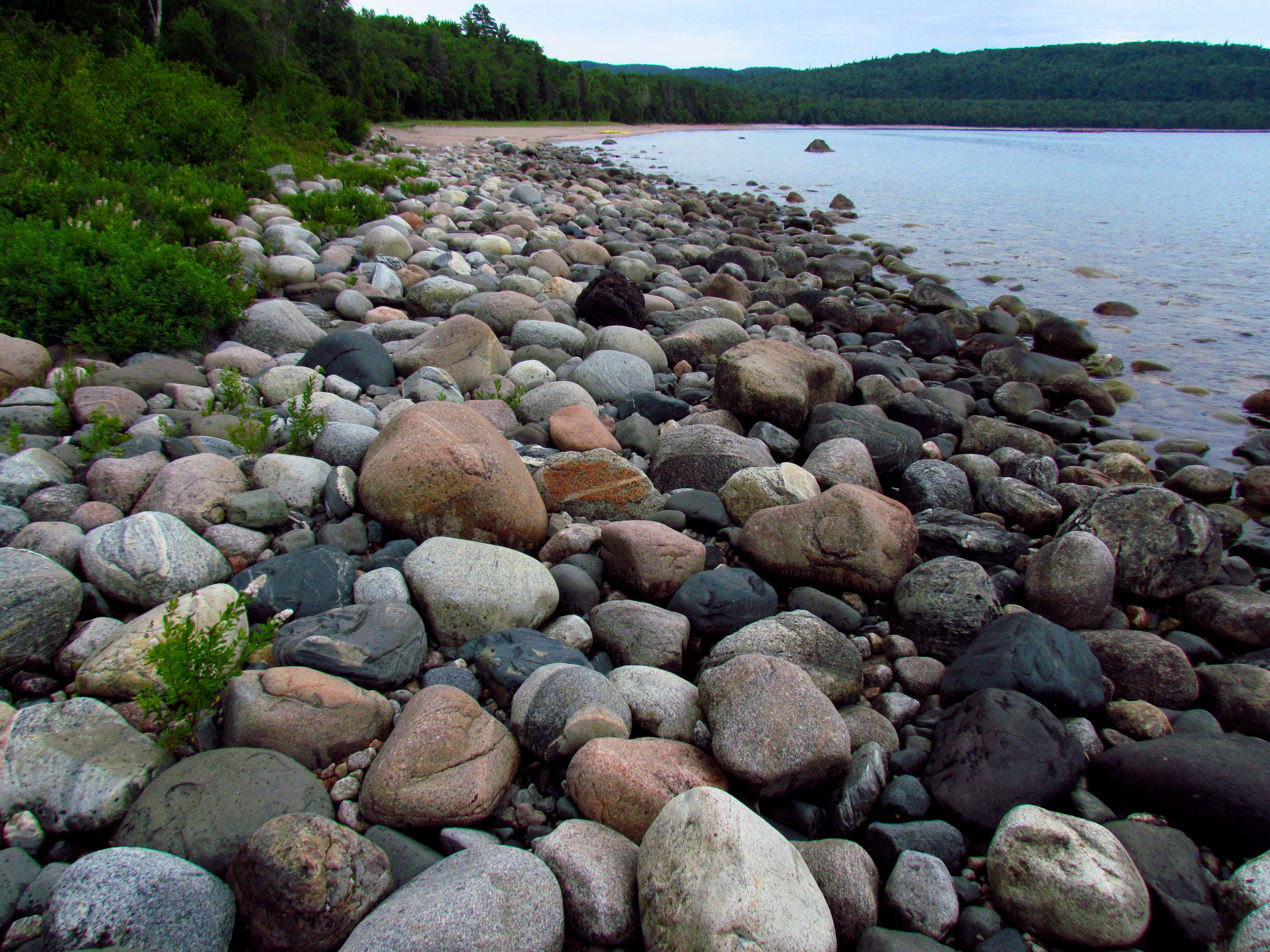
Gargantua Harbour

The Gargantua River is a river in the Algoma District of Ontario, Canada.

== See also ==
- List of Ontario rivers
