= Depot Creek (Thunder Bay District) =

- Location of the mouth of Depot Creek in Ontario

Location
- Country: Canada
- Province: Ontario
- Region: Northwestern Ontario
- District: Thunder Bay

Physical characteristics
- Source: Unnamed lake
  - coordinates: 48°37′33″N 89°32′38″W
  - elevation: 398 m (1,306 ft)
- Mouth: Kaministiquia River
  - coordinates: 48°37′21″N 89°35′39″W
  - elevation: 331 m (1,086 ft)

Depot Creek is a river in geographic Ware Township, Thunder Bay District in Northwestern Ontario, Canada. It is in the Great Lakes Basin and is a left tributary of the Kaministiquia River.

The creek begins at an unnamed lake and flows southwest and then west, passing under Silver Creek Road just before reaching its mouth at the Kaministiquia River, about 10 kilometres (6.2 mi) north northwest of the community of Kaministiquia. The Kaministiquia River flows to Lake Superior.

== See also ==
- List of rivers of Ontario

== Sources ==
- Map 13 (PDF) (Map). 1 : 1,600,000. Official road map of Ontario. Ministry of Transportation of Ontario. 2014.
- Restructured municipalities - Ontario map #1 (Map). Restructuring Maps of Ontario. Ontario Ministry of Municipal Affairs and Housing. 2006. Archived from the original on 2012-05-05.
