= Jessie Creek (Nipissing District) =

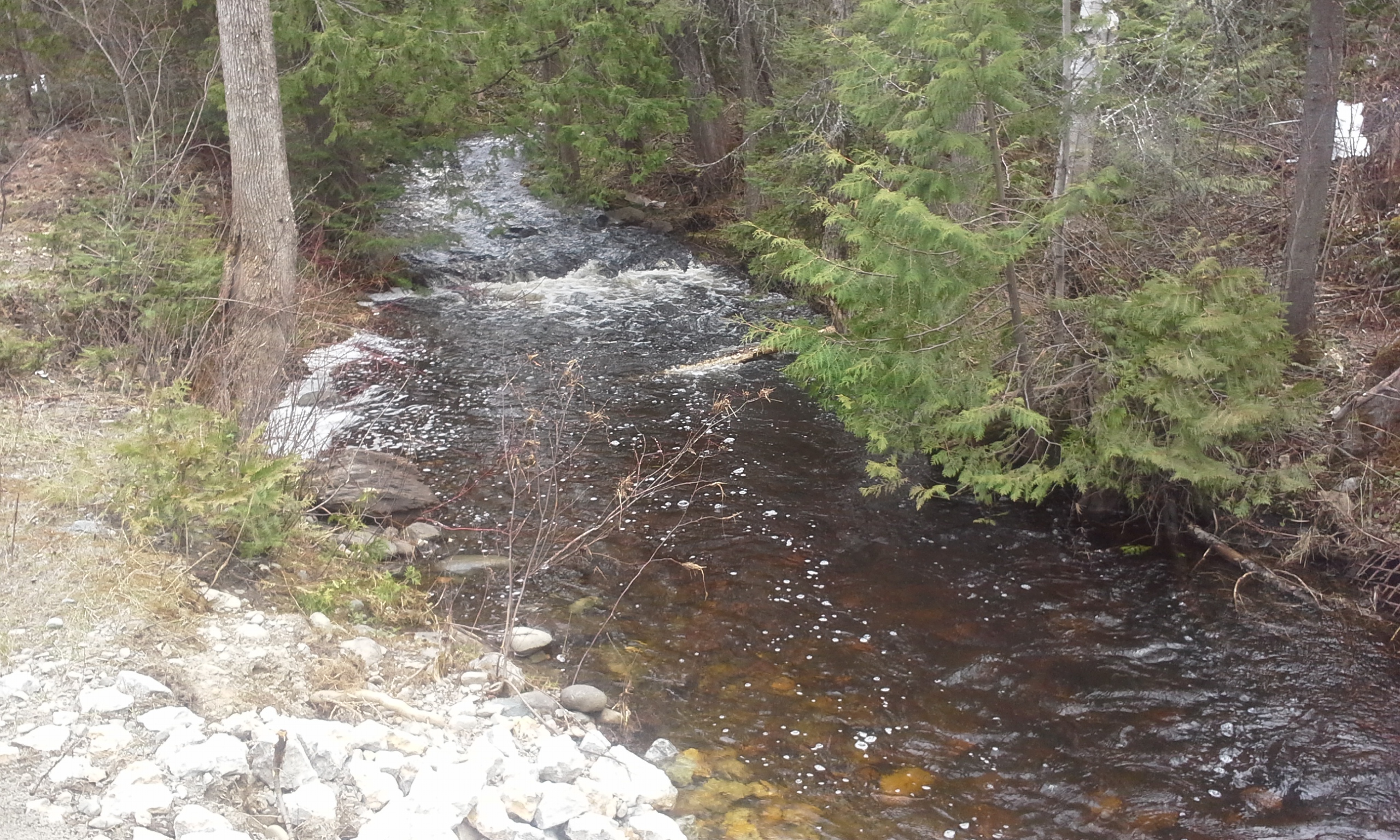
- Jessie Creek as seen from Strathcona Road

- Location of the mouth of Jessie Creek in Ontario

Location
- Country: Canada
- Province: Ontario
- Region: Northeastern Ontario
- District: Nipissing
- Municipality: Temagami

Physical characteristics
- Source: Unnamed pond
  - location: Strathcona Township
  - coordinates: 47°02′12″N 79°47′33″W
  - elevation: 312 m (1,024 ft)
- Mouth: Lake Temagami
  - location: Strathcona Township
  - coordinates: 47°3′1″N 79°48′30″W
  - elevation: 294 m (965 ft)
- Length: 2.6 km (1.6 mi)

Basin features
- River system: Great Lakes Basin

Jessie Creek is a stream in geographic Strathcona Township of Temagami in Nipissing District of Northeastern Ontario, Canada. It is part of the Great Lakes Basin and is one of several streams that empties into Lake Temagami.

== Course ==
The creek begins at an unnamed pond adjacent to the old Ferguson Highway and heads westward for 0.67 km (0.42 mi) where it flows under Highway 11. It then flows an additional 0.16 km (0.099 mi) to the northwest where it enters the northeastern end of Jessie Lake. The creek continues to flow northwards from the west end of Jessie Lake for 1.1 km (0.68 mi), crossing Strathcona Road then emptying into Inlet Bay of Lake Temagami.

== See also ==
- List of rivers of Ontario
