= Depot Creek (Napanee River tributary) =

- Location of the mouth of Depot Creek in southern Ontario

Location
- Country: Canada
- Province: Ontario
- Region: Eastern Ontario
- Counties: Frontenac; Lennox and Addington

Physical characteristics
- Source: Sixth Depot Lake
  - location: Stone Mills, Lennox and Addington County
  - coordinates: 44°35′03″N 76°54′28″W
  - elevation: 192 m (630 ft)
- Mouth: Napanee River
  - location: South Frontenac, Frontenac County
  - coordinates: 44°27′41″N 76°45′42″W
  - elevation: 141 m (463 ft)

Basin features
- River system: Great Lakes Basin

Depot Creek is a river in Frontenac County and Lennox and Addington County in Eastern Ontario, Canada. It is in the Great Lakes Basin and is a left tributary of the Napanee River.

== Course ==
The creek begins at Sixth Depot Lake in Stone Mills, Lennox and Addington County, and flows northeast into Central Frontenac, Frontenac County and to Fifth Depot Lake, then turns southeast to Fourth Depot Lake, turns south, is crossed by the Canadian Pacific Railway main line and reaches Third Depot Lake. It exits Third Depot Lake controlled by a dam, heads southeast to Second Depot Lake, exits that lake controlled by a dam, continues southeast into South Frontenac and to First Depot Lake, heads south, flows through the community of Bellrock, and reaches its mouth at the Napanee River. The Napanee River flows to the Bay of Quinte on Lake Ontario.

== See also ==
- List of Ontario rivers

== Sources ==
- Map 6 (PDF) (Map). 1 : 700,000. Official road map of Ontario. Ministry of Transportation of Ontario. 2014.
- Restructured municipalities - Ontario map #5 (Map). Restructuring Maps of Ontario. Ontario Ministry of Municipal Affairs and Housing. 2006. Archived from the original on 2020-05-11.
