= Baldhead River (Ontario) =

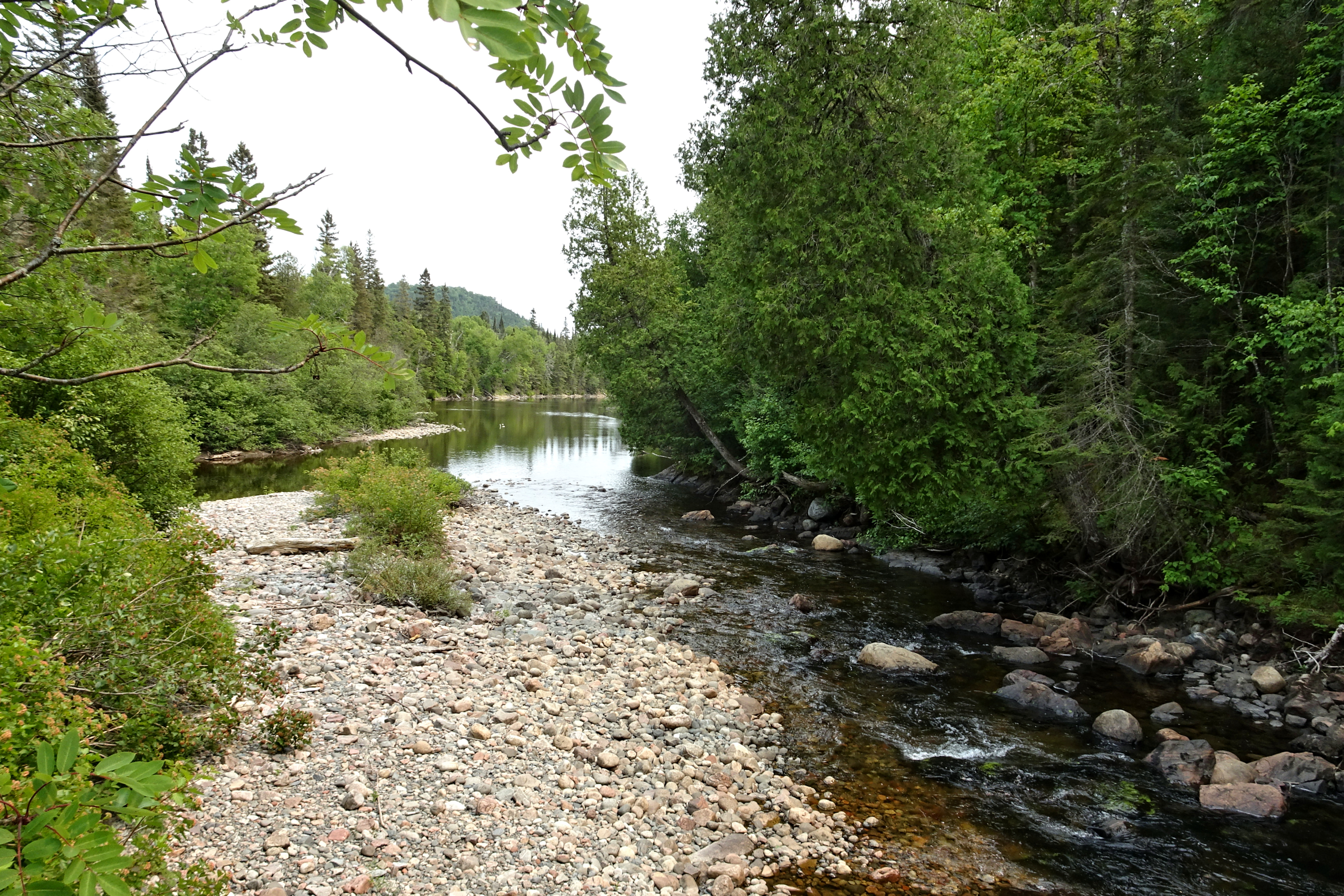

- Location of the mouth of the Baldhead River in Ontario

Location
- Country: Canada
- Province: Ontario
- Region: Northwestern Ontario
- District: Algoma

Physical characteristics
- Source: Baldhead Lake
  - coordinates: 47°42′40″N 84°44′43″W
  - elevation: 415 m (1,362 ft)
- Mouth: Lake Superior
  - coordinates: 47°29′06″N 84°50′16″W
  - elevation: 180 m (590 ft)
- Length: 30 km (19 mi)

Basin features
- River system: Lake Superior drainage basin
- Tributaries
  - left: East Branch Baldhead River

The Baldhead River is a river in the Lake Superior drainage basin in Algoma District in Northwestern Ontario, Canada. It is located entirely within Lake Superior Provincial Park.

== Course ==
The river begins at Baldhead Lake adjacent to the Mijinemungshing Lake parking area and heads west then southwest along the Mijinemungshing Road. It passes under the road, then turns south and parallels Ontario Highway 17. It takes in the left tributary East Branch Baldhead River, continues south and roughly parallel to Ontario Highway 17, and reaches its mouth near the headland named Bald Head on Lake Superior. The Orphan Lake Trail passes along the mouth of the river.

== See also ==
- List of rivers of Ontario

== Sources ==
- "Baldhead River". Geographical Names Data Base. Natural Resources Canada.
- "Baldhead River". Atlas of Canada. Natural Resources Canada. 2010-02-04.
