= Poplar River (Nipissing District) =

- Location of the river mouth in Ontario

Location
- Country: Canada
- Province: Ontario
- Region: Northeastern Ontario
- District: Nipissing

Physical characteristics
- Source: Poplar Lake
  - coordinates: 46°39′42″N 79°38′25″W
  - elevation: 294 m (965 ft)
- Mouth: Bear Lake
  - coordinates: 46°38′42″N 79°37′44″W
  - elevation: 294 m (965 ft)
- Length: 2 km (1.2 mi)

Basin features
- River system: Great Lakes Basin

The Poplar River is a river in the Unorganized North part of Nipissing District in northeastern Ontario, Canada. It is in the Great Lakes Basin.

The Poplar River begins at Poplar Lake in geographic Gladman Township and flows 2 kilometres (1.2 mi) south to its mouth at Bear Lake in geographic Hammell Townwship. Bear Lake flows via Tilden Lake, the Tomiko River, the Sturgeon River, Lake Nipissing and the French River to Georgian Bay on Lake Huron.

== Sources ==
- Map 12 (PDF) (Map). 1 : 1,600,000. Official road map of Ontario. Ministry of Transportation of Ontario. 2014.
- Restructured municipalities - Ontario map #4 (Map). Restructuring Maps of Ontario. Ontario Ministry of Municipal Affairs and Housing. 2006.
