= Little AuSable River =

Watercourse in Ontario, Canada

Coordinates: 43.18987°N 81.52255°W

The Little AuSable river is a spring-fed stream originating in Huron County, Ontario. It is the only stream of any size running through the township of Lucan Biddulph, a municipality whose watershed feeds the Little AuSable with pasture and field runoff. In the summer months, the Little AuSable's flow is reduced to a trickle; in the winter, its ponds have been home to ice hockey rinks and skating lessons.

Little AuSable intersects the Ausable, just outside Biddulph Township; here, the two rivers become one as they flow towards Lake Huron.

The Little AuSable river valley north of Lucan, Ontario serves as a tribute to the stream's grander past, and is a noted spot to watch the colours of autumn. The river's longest bridge spans this valley, allowing Highway 4 to reach Exeter.

== See also ==
- List of rivers of Ontario
