= Bonar Creek =

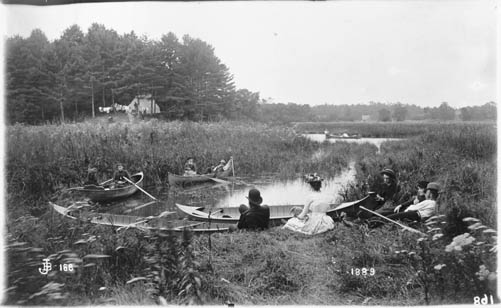
- Confluence of Bonar Creek and Mimico Creek in 1889

- Location of the mouth of the creek in Toronto

Location
- Country: Canada
- Province: Ontario
- Region: Greater Toronto Area
- Municipality: Toronto

Physical characteristics
- Mouth: Mimico Creek
  - location: Mimico
  - coordinates: 43°37′20″N 79°29′00″W
  - elevation: 367 m (1,204 ft)

Basin features
- River system: Lake Ontario drainage basin

Bonar Creek was a creek in Mimico, Ontario, Canada. It was a tributary of the still-existing Mimico Creek, a watercourse that empties into Lake Ontario. Bonar Creek joined Mimico Creek 130 metres (430 ft) north of Lake Shore Boulevard, in the marsh at the mouth of the Mimico Creek.

The creek is named for Irish immigrants Bill and Letitia Bonar who lived in a pumphouse near the waterway.

Almost the entire creek has been buried, except for a short stretch where the former watercourse joined Mimico Creek, and that remaining portion has been canalized. There are plans to restore part of the wetlands at the confluence of the two creeks.

== See also ==
- List of rivers of Ontario
