= Whitefish River (Lac Seul) =

- Location of the mouth of the Whitefish River in Ontario.

Location
- Country: Canada
- Province: Ontario
- Region: Northwestern Ontario
- District: Kenora

Physical characteristics
- Source: Unnamed lake
  - coordinates: 50°10′51″N 92°34′52″W
  - elevation: 383 m (1,257 ft)
- Mouth: Whitefish Lake (Kenora District)
  - coordinates: 50°09′50″N 92°31′55″W
  - elevation: 354 m (1,161 ft)
- Length: 9 km (5.6 mi)

Basin features
- Tributaries
  - right: Mold Creek

The Whitefish River is a short river in Kenora District in northwestern Ontario, Canada, and is in the Hudson Bay and Nelson River drainage basins.

== Course ==
The river begins at an unnamed lake and flows southwest then southeast and takes in the right tributary Mold Creek arriving from Mold Lake. It then heads east and reaches its mouth at a small bay at the very west end of Whitefish Lake. Whitefish Lake in turn empties via the Whitefish Channel into Whitefish Bay on Lac Seul, part of the English River.

== Tributaries ==
- Mold Creek (right)

== See also ==
- List of rivers of Ontario
