= Sturgeon River (Kenora District) =

Coordinates: 50.3494°N 94.495°W

Location
- Country: Canada
- Province: Ontario

Physical characteristics
- Mouth
  - location: English River
  - elevation: 313 m (1,027 ft)
- Length: 81 km (50 mi)

The Sturgeon River is a river located in Kenora District in northwestern Ontario, Canada. It travels 81 km (50 mi) south from its head to the English River.

== Tributaries ==
- Campfire River
- Confusion River

== See also ==
- List of rivers of Ontario
