= Summit Lake (Thunder Bay District) =

Lake in Thunder Bay District, Ontario, Canada

- Location within Ontario
- Location: Thunder Bay District, Ontario
- Coordinates: 50°25′32″N 87°44′15″W
- Primary inflows: Gripp River
- Primary outflows: Ombabika River, Powitik River
- Basin countries: Canada
- Max. length: 5.9 km (3.7 mi)
- Max. width: 1.7 km (1.1 mi)
- Surface elevation: 317 m (1,040 ft)

Summit Lake is a lake in Unorganized Thunder Bay District in Northwestern Ontario, Canada, about 75 kilometres (47 mi) northwest of the community of Nakina, and 22 kilometres (14 mi) northeast of the Auden and Ombabika stops on the Canadian National Railway transcontinental mainline.

== Hydrology ==
Summit Lake is about 5.9 kilometres (3.7 mi) long and 1.7 kilometres (1.1 mi) wide, and lies at an elevation of 317 metres (1,040 ft). The mouth of the Gripp River is at the southeast corner, and there are four unnamed creeks as secondary inflows. The primary outflows are the Ombabika River, at the southwest corner, and the Powitik River, at the north end of the lake; Summit Lake is the source for both. The former river flows into Lake Nipigon and via the Nipigon River into Lake Superior. The latter flows via the Kapikotongwa River, Little Current River, Kenogami River and Albany River to James Bay. Thus, the lake is in both the Albany River system in the James Bay drainage basin, and the Nipigon River system in the Lake Superior (Great Lakes Basin) drainage basin.
