= Whitefish River (Berens River tributary) =

- Location of the mouth of the Whitefish River in Ontario.

Location
- Country: Canada
- Province: Ontario
- Region: Northwestern Ontario
- District: Kenora

Physical characteristics
- Source: Unnamed lake
  - coordinates: 51°34′48″N 92°23′47″W
  - elevation: 445 m (1,460 ft)
- Mouth: Berens River
  - coordinates: 51°40′28″N 92°39′44″W
  - elevation: 373 m (1,224 ft)
- Length: 38 km (24 mi)

The Whitefish River is a river in Kenora District in northwestern Ontario, Canada. It is in the Hudson Bay and Nelson River drainage basins and is a tributary of the Berens River.

== Course ==
The river begins at an unnamed lake and flows south to Retter Lake. It heads west, takes in the left tributary outflow from an unnamed creek from Blondin Lake, and turns north to take in the right tributary outflow from an unnamed creek from Turp Lake. The river then heads northwest, takes in left tributary unnamed creek outflow from Coathup Lake and reaches its mouth at the Berens River, which empties into Lake Winnipeg.

== See also ==
- List of rivers of Ontario
