= Doran River =

- Location of the mouth of the Doran River in Ontario

Location
- Country: Canada
- Province: Ontario
- Region: Northwestern Ontario
- District: Thunder Bay

Physical characteristics
- Source: Unnamed lake
  - coordinates: 50°59′11″N 90°42′18″W
  - elevation: 397 m (1,302 ft)
- Mouth: Lake St. Joseph
  - coordinates: 51°00′24″N 90°26′22″W
  - elevation: 374 m (1,227 ft)

Basin features
- River system: James Bay drainage basin

The Doran River is a river in the Unorganized Part of Thunder Bay District in Northwestern Ontario, Canada. The river is part of the James Bay drainage basin and is a tributary of Lake St. Joseph.

The river begins at an unnamed lake and flows southeast to Doran Lake. It heads northeast through Thelma Lake, and reaches its mouth at Lake St. Joseph, the source of the Albany River, which flows to James Bay.

== Sources ==
- Map 16 (PDF) (Map). 1 : 1,600,000. Official road map of Ontario. Ministry of Transportation of Ontario. 2014.
- Restructured municipalities - Ontario map #2 (Map). Restructuring Maps of Ontario. Ontario Ministry of Municipal Affairs and Housing. 2006. Archived from the original on 2014-04-10.
