= Seal River (Ontario) =

- Location of the mouth of the Seal River in Ontario

Location
- Country: Canada
- Province: Ontario
- Region: Northeastern Ontario
- District: Cochrane

Physical characteristics
- Source: Unnamed lake
  - coordinates: 50°14′16″N 79°58′51″W
  - elevation: 281 m (922 ft)
- Mouth: Kesagami River
  - coordinates: 50°59′36″N 79°42′31″W
  - elevation: 3 m (9.8 ft)

Basin features
- River system: James Bay drainage basin

The Seal River is a river in northern Cochrane District in Northeastern Ontario, Canada. It is part of the James Bay drainage basin, and is a right tributary of the Kesagami River.

The river begins at an unnamed lake, flows north through Seal Lake, then continues north and reaches its mouth at the Kesagami River, just downstream of the mouth of the Little Seal River. The Kesagami River flows via the Harricana River to James Bay.

== See also ==
- List of rivers of Ontario
- List of Hudson Bay rivers
- List of rivers of Canada
