= Neebing River =

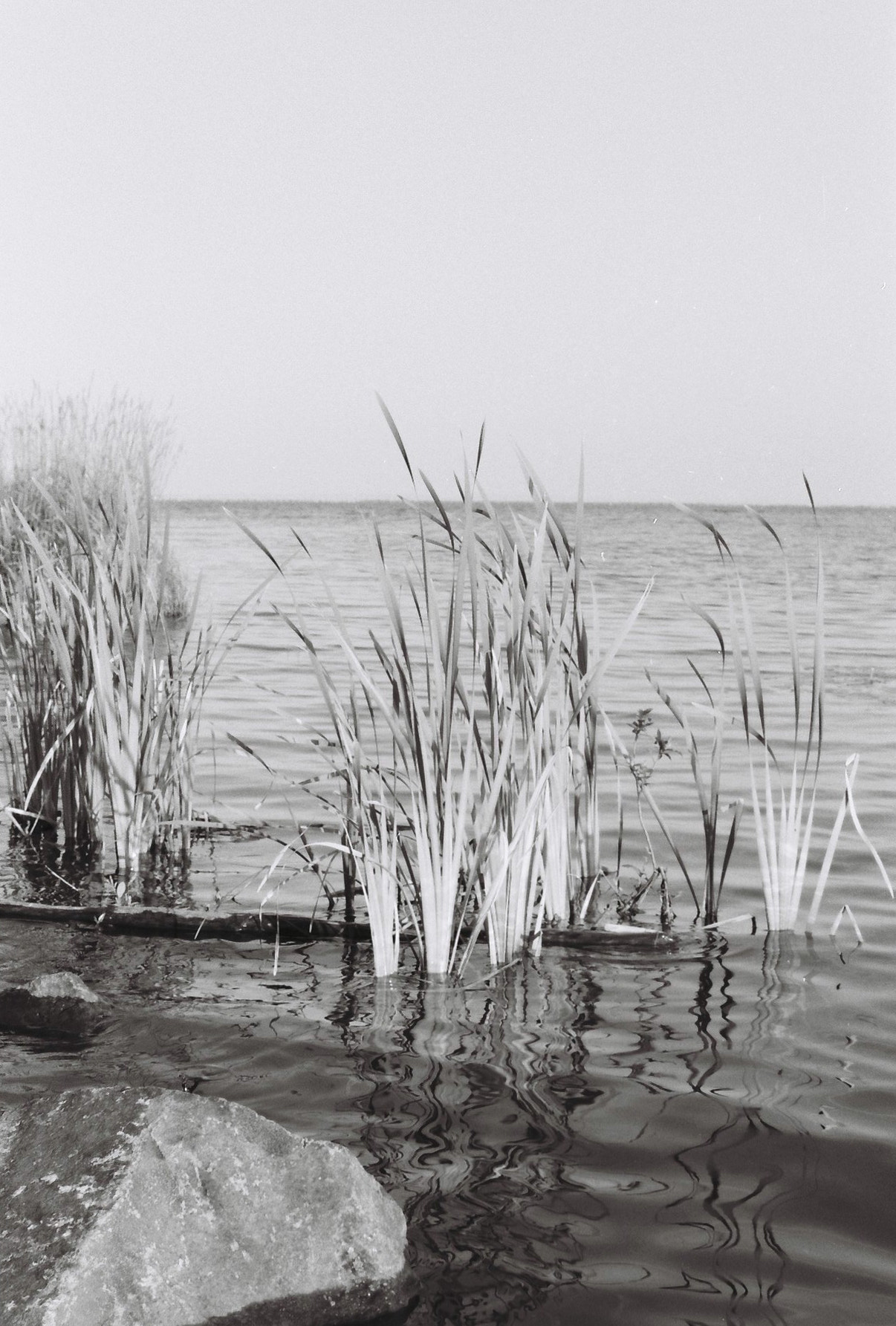

Physical characteristics
- Mouth: McIntyre River
  - location: Thunder Bay
  - coordinates: 48°24′03″N 89°14′17″W
- Length: 55.7 km (34.6 mi)
- Basin size: 227.7^{km}
- Width
  - minimum: 4.5 meters
  - maximum: 11 meters
- Depth
  - minimum: 0.5 meters

The Neebing River is a freshwater river in Canada. It extends along the western portions of Thunder Bay and the Oliver Paipoonge Municipality.

The river is managed by the Lakehead Region Conservation Authority and has a watershed of 227.7 square kilometres.
