= Black Sturgeon River (Thunder Bay District) =

River in Northwestern Ontario, Canada

- Location of the mouth of the Black Sturgeon River in Ontario.

Location
- Country: Canada
- Province: Ontario
- Region: Northwestern Ontario
- District: Thunder Bay

Physical characteristics
- Source: Black Sturgeon Lake
  - coordinates: 49°17′00″N 88°46′32″W
  - elevation: 251 m (823 ft)
- Mouth: Black Bay (Lake Superior)
  - coordinates: 48°50′10″N 88°24′15″W
  - elevation: 180 m (590 ft)
- Length: 72 km (45 mi)

Basin features
- River system: Lake Superior drainage basin
- Tributaries
  - right: Nonwatin River

The Black Sturgeon River is a river in Thunder Bay District, Northwestern Ontario, Canada, located west of the Nipigon River, that flows to Lake Superior.

Most of the river is protected in the Black Sturgeon River Provincial Park, a waterway park stretching from Black Sturgeon Dam north to and including the lands around Black Sturgeon Lake.

== History ==
In 1959, a dam was constructed on the Black Sturgeon River in order to control water levels. The dam also prevented access to the upper reaches of the river. Many speculated that this construction is what led to the collapse of the most common fish type in the area, the walleye.

== Geography ==
The river begins at Black Sturgeon Lake, southwest of Lake Nipigon, and flows southeast over the Split Rapids to Nonwatin Lake where the right tributary Nonwatin River and left tributary Ferguson Creek join. It turns south, passes Mount Magee on the left, and continues southeast over the Gardener Rapids and Black Sturgeon Dam, and further downstream heads under Ontario Highway 11 / Ontario Highway 17, the Canadian National Railway line and the Canadian Pacific Railway mainline at the settlement of Everard. The Black Sturgeon turns abruptly southwest and reaches its mouth at Black Bay on Lake Superior, about 6 kilometres (4 mi) southeast of the community of Hurkett.

=== Tributaries ===
- Moseau Creek (left)
- Shillabeer Creek (right)
- Larson Creek (left)
- Scooper Creek (right)
- Mound Creek (left)
- Nonwatin River (right)
- Ferguson Creek (left)

== Geology ==
The river valley and Black Sturgeon Lake follow a major fault line, the Black Sturgeon Fault, which runs north–south. The valley also contains sills with columnar jointing which are related to the Midcontinent Rift System.

== Black Sturgeon River Provincial Park ==
Black Sturgeon River Provincial Park
- IUCN category II (national park)
- Interactive map of Black Sturgeon River Provincial Park
- Nearest town: Nipigon
- Coordinates: 49°10′00″N 88°37′30″W
- Area: 23,531 ha (90.85 sq mi)
- Designation: Waterway
- Established: 2002
- Governing body: Ontario Parks
- Website: www.ontarioparks.com/park/blacksturgeonriver

The Black Sturgeon River Provincial Park protects most of the Black Sturgeon River and wide swaths of land along its banks. It also includes the shores of Black Sturgeon Lake, stretching to the southern point of Lake Nipigon's Black Sturgeon Bay. It was established in 2002 to protect an important recreational waterway for fishing, hunting and canoeing. Other permitted activities are mountain biking, swimming, boating, and rock climbing. Winter activities include snowmobiling, snowshoeing, and dogsledding.

The park is part of the Lake Nipigon Basin Signature Site, an area remarkable for its range of natural and recreational values and the potential for future recreation and tourism opportunities. This site also includes other provincial parks, conservation reserves, and management areas around Lake Nipigon, all sharing common geographic themes, recreation uses, and resource issues.

Significant features of the park include Nipigon Moraine remnant, unconsolidated transverse ridges, provincially rare smooth woodsia (Woodsia glabella), and diabase cliffs and talus slopes. The forests within the park are mostly boreal mixedwood that are generally more species-rich than areas to the east and west. The park also plays an important role as a natural wildlife corridor between the Lake Nipigon Basin and the shoreline of Lake Superior, in particular for woodland caribou.

It is a non-operating park, meaning that there are no facilities or services.

== See also ==
- Black Sturgeon River (Kenora District)
- List of rivers of Ontario

== Sources ==
- "Black Sturgeon River". Atlas of Canada. Natural Resources Canada. 2010-02-04. Archived from the original on 2012-10-06. Shows course of river.
