= Depot Creek (Lake Nosbonsing) =

- Location of the mouth of Depot Creek in Ontario

Location
- Country: Canada
- Province: Ontario
- Region: Northeastern Ontario
- District: Nipissing

Physical characteristics
- Source: Unnamed lake
  - location: Boulter Township
  - coordinates: 46°08′57″N 79°01′28″W
  - elevation: 402 m (1,319 ft)
- Mouth: Lake Nosbonsing
  - location: East Ferris
  - coordinates: 46°11′24″N 79°12′31″W
  - elevation: 237 m (778 ft)

Basin features
- River system: Saint Lawrence River drainage basin

Depot Creek is a river in Nipissing District in Northeastern Ontario, Canada. It is in the Saint Lawrence River drainage basin and is a tributary of Lake Nosbonsing.

The creek begins at an unnamed lake in geographic Boulter Township and flows southeast to Guilmette Lake, then turns west to Sobie Lake. The river heads northwest into the municipality of Chisholm, continues northwest into the municipality of East Ferris, and reaches its mouth at Lake Nosbonsing. Lake Nosbonsing flows via the Kaibuskong River, the Mattawa River and the Ottawa River to the Saint Lawrence River.

The river was originally called Nosbonsing River, but renamed to Depot Creek when the J.R. Booth Company established a logging depot there. It was used to float logs down to Lake Nosbonsing, and the company diverted the waters from the Wasi River for a while to boost its flow.

== See also ==
- List of rivers of Ontario

== Sources ==
- Map 9 (PDF) (Map). 1 : 700,000. Official road map of Ontario. Ministry of Transportation of Ontario. 2014.
- Restructured municipalities - Ontario map #4 (Map). Restructuring Maps of Ontario. Ontario Ministry of Municipal Affairs and Housing. 2006. Archived from the original on 2014-04-10.
