= List of numbered roads in Lanark County =

This is a list of numbered county roads in Lanark County, Ontario. Connecting road segments (some not maintained by the county) are named in parentheses.

County Road #	Local name(s)	Northern/Eastern Terminus	Southern/Western Terminus	Settlements served	Additional Notes
1	Rideau Ferry Road	South Street	Rideau Canal	Perth, Rideau Ferry	continues as Leeds & Grenville County Road 1 to Lombardy
2	Heritage Drive	City of Ottawa limits	Grenville County limits		continues as City of Ottawa Road 2 to Becketts Landing continues as Leeds & Grenville County Road 15 to Merrickville
4	Cornelia Street East	Montague Boundary Road (at the City of Ottawa Limits where it meets the Montague Township limits)	Highway 15	Smiths Falls, Montague	continues as City of Ottawa Road 6 where the name changes to Roger Stevens Drive and continues to North Gower
6	Althorpe Road; Christie Lake Road; Sunset Boulevard	County Road 43	County Road 36	Althorpe, DeWitts Corners, Glen Tay, Perth	
7	Fallbrook Road	County Road 511	County Road 12	Playfairville, Fallbrook, Balderson	
7B	Townline Road West; Townline Road East	County Road 29	Highway 7	Carleton Place	
8	Watsons Corners Road (County Road 511); Herron Mills Road; 6th Concession C Lanark	County Road 16	County Road 511	Herron Mills, Watsons Corners, McDonald's Corners	
9	Tatlock Road	Highway 7	County Road 511	Union Hall, Clayton, Halls Mills, Tatlock	
9A	McIlraith Road	Tatlock marble quarry	County Road 511		dead-end road, cut off from continuing to County Road 9 (Tatlock Road) by marble quarry not signed
10	Scotch Line; South Street (Gore Street East) (Gore Street West) (North Street); Drummond Concession 2 Perth Road (Highway 15); Richmond Road	Ashton Station Road	Leeds County limits	Franktown, Perth, Scotch Line	shares Gore Street East, Perth, with County Road 43 part of a relay of County Roads 10 linking Richmond to Kingston
11	Wilson Street; River Road	County Road 17	County Road 29	Appleton	
12	McDonald's Corners Road; Markle Road; Mill Street; South Street; Pine Grove Road	County Road 15	County Road 36	Lanark, Playfairville, McDonald's Corners, Elphin	
14	Narrows Lock Road	County Road 10	Rideau Canal	Black Lake, Narrows Lock	continues as Leeds & Grenville County Road 14 to Crosby
15	Fergusons Falls Road	Highway 7	County Road 511	Fergusons Falls	
16	South Lavant Road (County Road 511); Wolf Grove Road; Almonte Street	County Road 29	Frontenac County limits	Lavant, Poland, Hopetown, Middleville, Union Hall, Almonte	
16A	Perth Street; Bridge Street; Queen Street; Martin Street South	County Road 17	County Road 29	Almonte	
17	Blakeney Road; Panmure Road; Martin Street North (Ottawa Street); Appleton Side Road; Cemetery Side Road; Derry Side Road	County Road 20	County Road 10	Pakenham, Blakeney, Almonte	
18	Port Elmsley Road	County Road 1	County Road 43	Port Elmsley	
19	Bennett Lake Road	County Road 7	County Road 36	Fallbrook, Pratt Corners	
20	Waba Road (County Road No. 29 North); Kinburn Sideroad	Timmins Road	Robertson Line	Pakenham	continues as City of Ottawa Road 20 to Kinburn
21	Lally Road; Elm Grove Road	County Road 1	County Road 14	Murphy's Point Provincial Park	
22	Shaw Road	Lunney Road	County Road 20	Pakenham Township	minor connecting route
23	Rosedale Road South	County Road 4	County Road 43	Rosedale	
24	Campbell Side Road; 4th Concession Pakenham; Bellamy Road; Peneshula Road	County Road 20	Snye Road	Uneeda, Pickerel Bay	
29	County Road No. 29 North; Christian Street; County Road No. 29 South; Townline Road East; McNeely Avenue	Walter Bradley Road	Highway 7	Pakenham, Almonte, Carleton Place	continues as City of Ottawa Road 29 to Highway 417 at Exit 180
36	Snow Road; Elphin Maberly Road; Maberly Elphin Road; Bolingbroke Road	Frontenac County limits	Leeds County limits	Elphin, Maberly, Bolingbroke	continues as Leeds & Grenville County Road 36 to Westport
43	County Road 43 (Queen Street) (Elmsley Street South) (Elmsley Street North) (Cornelia Street West) (Craig Street) (Gore Street East) (North Street) (Wilson Street West)	Grenville County limits	Highway 7	Smiths Falls, Port Elmsley, Perth	Formerly Highway 43; shares Gore Street East, Perth, with County Road 10; continues as Leeds & Grenville County Road 43 to Merrickville; no longer signed within Perth town limits
49	March Road	Golden Line Road	County Road 17	Almonte	continues as City of Ottawa Road 49 to Highway 417 at Exit 155
511	Lanark Road; Highway 511; South Street; George Street	Renfrew County limits	Highway 7	Perth, Balderson, Lanark, Hopetown	continues as Renfrew County Road 511 to Calabogie (Note: 511 was a former secondary highway before it was downloaded to Lanark and Renfrew counties)
