= Severn River (Hudson Bay) =

River in Ontario, Canada

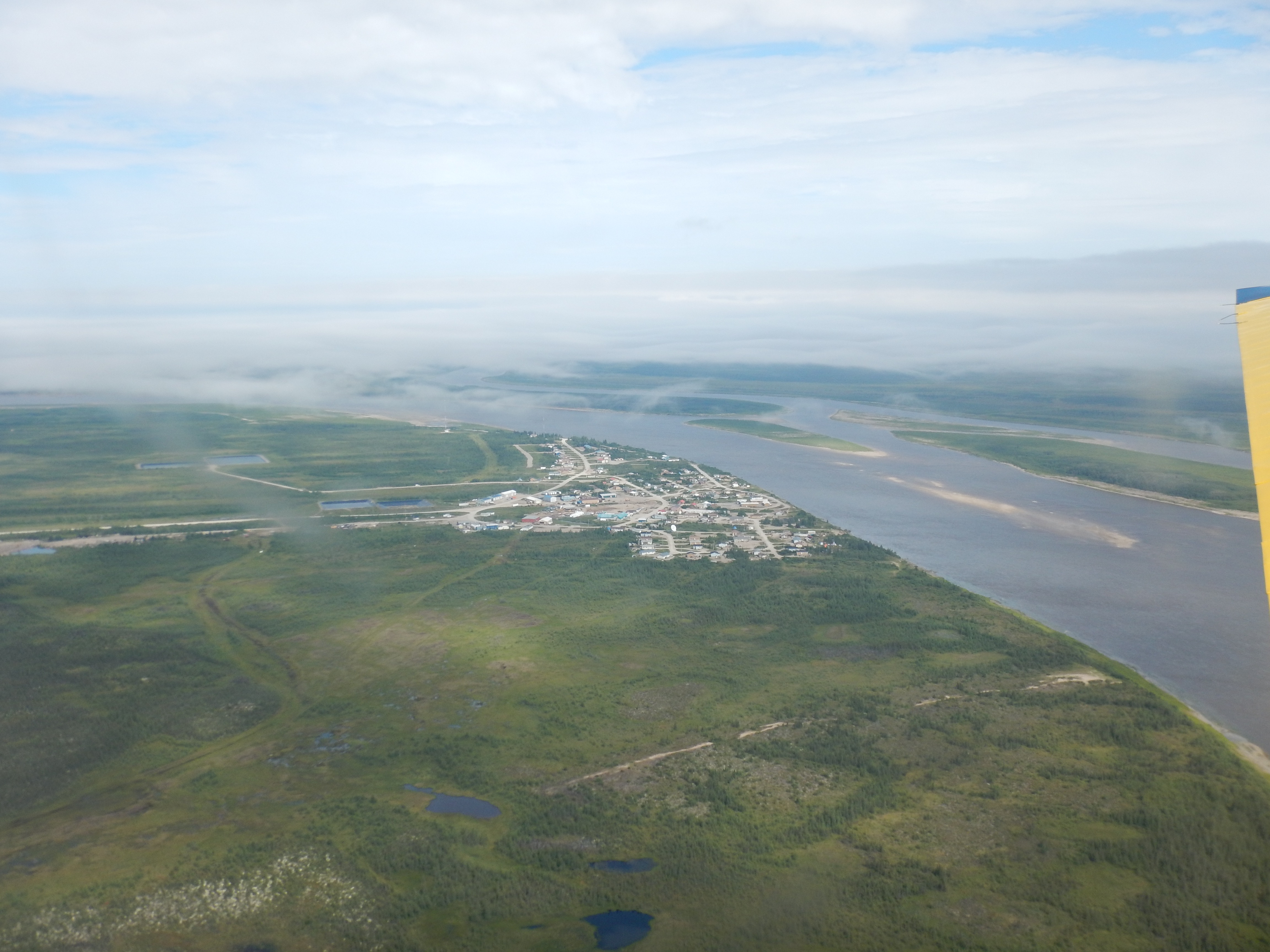
- Severn River near its mouth at Fort Severn

- Location of the mouth of Severn River in Ontario
- Native name: Washaho (Swampy Cree)

Location
- Country: Canada
- Province: Ontario

Physical characteristics
- Source: Deer Lake
  - location: Deer Lake, Kenora District
  - coordinates: 52°40′N 94°25′W
  - elevation: 310 m (1,020 ft)
- Mouth: Hudson Bay
  - location: Fort Severn
  - coordinates: 55°59′N 87°38′W
- Length: 982 km (610 mi)
- Basin size: 102,800 km^{2} (39,700 sq mi)
- Discharge
  - location: Limestone Rapids
  - average: 644.8 m^{3}/s (22,770 cu ft/s)
  - minimum: 196.67 m^{3}/s (6,945 cu ft/s)
  - maximum: 1,252.4 m^{3}/s (44,230 cu ft/s)

Basin features
- River system: Hudson Bay drainage basin

The Severn River (Note: Swampy Cree: Washaho) is a river in northern Ontario. The northern Ontario river has its headwaters near the western border of the province. From the head of the Black Birch River, the Severn River is 982 km (610 mi) long, tying it with the Albany River for the title of longest river entirely in Ontario. Its drainage basin area is 102,800 km^{2} (39,700 sq mi), a small portion of which is in Manitoba. Its source is Deer Lake and flows northeasterly into Severn Lake, then by a second section to Hudson Bay where it ends at Fort Severn.

The First Nation communities of Sandy Lake, Bearskin Lake, and Fort Severn are located along the river. These were formed at the sites of former trading posts built when the Severn River was a prominent river during the fur trade era. The Swampy Cree name for the river, Washaho Sipi, means "the bay within the bay river."^{:52}

The mouth of the river was located by the English in 1631 during expeditions by captains Thomas James and Luke Foxe. Later, Fort Severn was established there as a trading post in 1689 by the Hudson's Bay Company. It was captured by Pierre le Moyne, sieur d'Iberville in 1690. The post, rebuilt in 1759, has been in continuous operation to this day making this community one of the oldest European settlements in Ontario.

At its source on Deer Lake is the small community of Deer Lake, Ontario.

== Tributaries ==
Tributaries of the northern Severn River include:

- McInness River
- Cobham River (source in Manitoba)
- Windigo River
- Makoop River
- Blackbear River
- Sachigo River
  - Wapaseese River
  - Beaver Stone River
- Fawn River
- Beaver River

== See also ==
- List of longest rivers of Canada
- List of Ontario rivers
