= Cudmore Creek =

- Location of the stream mouth in Ontario

Location
- Country: Canada
- Province: Ontario
- Region: Northwestern Ontario
- District: Kenora

Physical characteristics
- Source
  - coordinates: 52°34′36″N 82°15′48″W
  - elevation: 15 m (49 ft)
- Mouth: James Bay
  - coordinates: 52°45′54″N 81°56′06″W
  - elevation: 0 m (0 ft)

Basin features
- River system: James Bay drainage basin

The Cudmore Creek is a stream in northeastern Kenora District in northwestern Ontario, Canada. It is a tributary of James Bay.

Cudmore Creek begins at the edge of a swamp and flows northeast to its mouth at James Bay, adjacent and to the south of the mouth of the Kapiskau River.

== Sources ==
- "Cudmore Creek" at Atlas of Canada. Accessed 2016-04-24.
- Map 18 (PDF) (Map). 1 : 1,600,000. Official road map of Ontario. Ministry of Transportation of Ontario. 2014.
