= Seal River (Cook Inlet) =

- Location of the mouth of the Seal River in Alaska

Location
- Country: United States
- State: Alaska
- District: Kenai Peninsula Borough

Physical characteristics
- Source: Unnamed muskeg
  - coordinates: 60°41′54″N 152°07′23″W
  - elevation: 8 m (26 ft)
- Mouth: Cook Inlet
  - coordinates: 60°38′36″N 152°03′33″W
  - elevation: 0 m (0 ft)

Basin features
- River system: Pacific Ocean drainage basin

The Seal River is a river in Kenai Peninsula Borough in Alaska, United States. It is part of the Pacific Ocean drainage basin, and is a tributary of Cook Inlet.

The river flows east from an unnamed muskeg to Redoubt Bay on Cook Inlet.

== See also ==
- List of rivers of Alaska
