= Little Seal River (Ontario) =

- Location of the mouth of the Little Seal River in Ontario

Location
- Country: Canada
- Province: Ontario
- Region: Northeastern Ontario
- District: Cochrane

Physical characteristics
- Source: Unnamed muskeg
  - coordinates: 50°50′24″N 79°46′52″W
  - elevation: 35 m (115 ft)
- Mouth: Kesagami River
  - coordinates: 50°58′08″N 79°42′57″W
  - elevation: 7 m (23 ft)

Basin features
- River system: James Bay drainage basin

The Little Seal River is a river in northern Cochrane District in Northeastern Ontario, Canada. It is part of the James Bay drainage basin, and is a right tributary of the Kesagami River.

The river begins in unnamed muskeg, flows northeast then northwest, and reaches its mouth at the Kesagami River, just upstream of the mouth of the Seal River. The Kesagami River flows via the Harricana River to James Bay.

== See also ==
- List of rivers of Ontario

== Sources ==
- Map 15 (PDF) (Map). 1 : 1,600,000. Official road map of Ontario. Ministry of Transportation of Ontario. 2014.
- Restructured municipalities - Ontario map #3 (Map). Restructuring Maps of Ontario. Ontario Ministry of Municipal Affairs and Housing. 2006.
