= Key River =

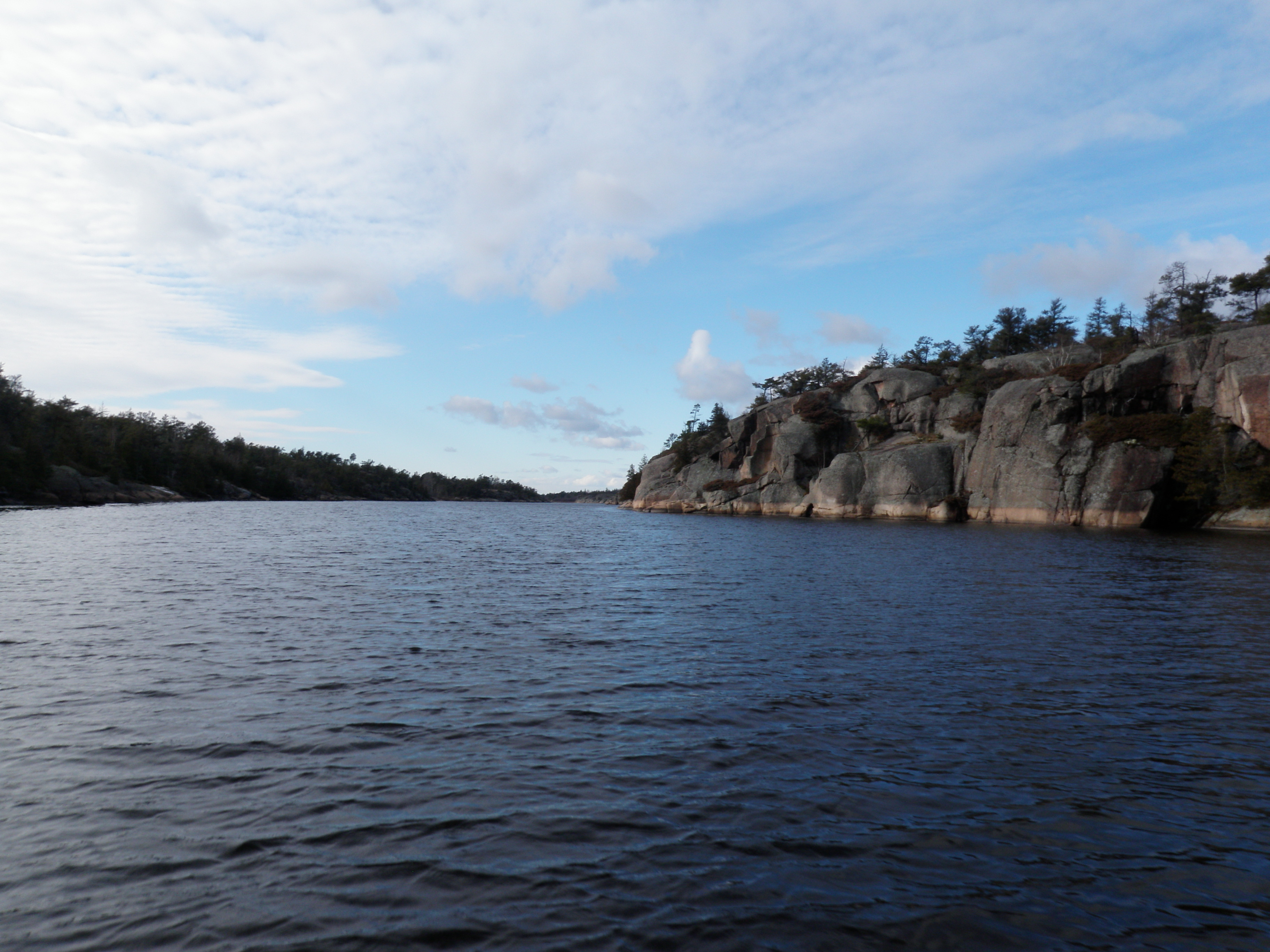
- Key River west of Highway 69

- Location of the mouth of the Key River in Ontario

Location
- Country: Canada
- Province: Ontario
- Region: Parry Sound

Physical characteristics
- Source: Portage Lake
  - location: Parry Sound District
  - coordinates: 45°54′08″N 80°33′12″W
- Mouth: Georgian Bay
  - location: Parry Sound District
  - coordinates: 45°53′20″N 80°44′01″W
- Length: 16 km (9.9 mi)

The Key River is a short river in Central Ontario, Canada. It flows 16 kilometres (9.9 mi) from Portage Lake west to its mouth at Key Harbour in Georgian Bay of Lake Huron. The river allows access to Northeastern Georgian Bay for recreational anglers, cottagers, and canoeists from Ontario Highway 69. The river is mostly bound by the French River Provincial Park on its northern shore, and by Henvey Inlet First Nation Reserve on its southern shore.

== Geography ==
The Key River flows through typical Canadian Shield country, in many places exposing rugged glaciated rock cliffs and outcrops with shallow soils and sections of marshy lowlands.

== History ==
Historically the Anishinaabe Ojibway people lived in this area of the Great Lakes. In 1850 they signed the Robinson-Huron Treaty with the British crown which included provisions for establishing the Henvy Inlet First Nation Reserve number 2, bordering the southern shore of the Key River. Starting in 1907, a rail line was constructed to the mouth of the Key River at Key Harbour, connecting it to an iron ore mine in the Sudbury area. Large piers and a powerhouse were constructed at Key Harbour to unloaded rail cars of iron ore into large freighter ships for further transport to markets. Ultimately the venture failed, and the last iron ore shipments made in 1916. During the period from 1929-1938, coal was unloaded at Key Harbour for the Canadian National Railway Company using a 1,200-foot (370 m) long dock constructed into the harbour. Due to declining use, the Key Junction spur rail line to Key Harbour was removed and dismantled in 1960. In 2018 the Parry Sound forest fire burned more than a dozen cottages and structures and consumed 11,000 hectares (27,000 acres) of forest in the areas to the north and south of the Key River.

== Ecology ==
The natural landscape of the Key River area is largely undeveloped and rich in mammal, reptile, bird, and fish species. Typical mammals found in this area include moose, American mink, black bears, red fox, and Eastern chipmunks. Reptiles found in the area include northern water snake, the threatened massasauga rattlesnake, the threatened fox snake, snapping turtles, and the endangered five-lined skink. Common birds of the area include ring-billed gull, turkey vulture, and ruffed grouse. Fish such as northern pike, small-mouth bass, and walleye are commonly caught by anglers in the Key river. Vegetation of the forests surrounding the river consists of eastern white pine trees, jack pine trees, white birch trees, eastern juniper bushes, blueberry bushes and many moss and lichen species. Much of the forest along the banks of the Key river were completely burnt by the 2018 Parry Sound forest fire.
