= Black Duck River (Manitoba–Ontario) =

- Location of the mouth of the Black Duck River in Manitoba

Location
- Country: Canada
- Provinces: Manitoba; Ontario

Physical characteristics
- Source: Hosea Lake
  - location: Kenora District, Ontario
  - coordinates: 55°56′48″N 90°13′29″W
  - elevation: 152 m (499 ft)
- Mouth: Hudson Bay
  - location: Northern Region, Manitoba
  - coordinates: 56°51′05″N 89°02′14″W
  - elevation: 0 m (0 ft)

Basin features
- River system: Hudson Bay drainage basin

The Black Duck River is a river in the provinces of Manitoba and Ontario, Canada. Flowing northeast from Hosea Lake in Kenora District in Northwestern Ontario, the river criss-crosses the Manitoba-Ontario border before reaching to its mouth at Hudson Bay in the Northern Region of Manitoba just west of Manitoba's easternmost point where the inter-provincial border meets the bay.

== Course ==
The river starts at Hosea Lake and ends at Hudson Bay.
