= Beaver River (Severn River tributary) =

- Location of the mouth of the Beaver River in Ontario

Location
- Country: Canada
- Province: Ontario
- Region: Central Ontario
- District: Kenora

Physical characteristics
- Source: Unnamed lake
  - coordinates: 55°46′13″N 89°54′51″W
  - elevation: 160 m (520 ft)
- Mouth: Severn River
  - coordinates: 55°55′21″N 87°48′48″W
  - elevation: 4 m (13 ft)

Basin features
- River system: Hudson Bay drainage basin

The Beaver River is a river in the far north of Kenora District in Northwestern Ontario, Canada. It is part of the Hudson Bay drainage basin, and is a left tributary of the Severn River.

== Course ==
The river begins at an unnamed lake and first heads southeast, then northeast, and reaches its mouth at the Severn River, about 25 kilometres (16 mi) southwest of that river's mouth at Hudson Bay near the First Nations community of Fort Severn.

== Sources ==
- Map 18 (PDF) (Map). 1 : 1,600,000. Official road map of Ontario. Ministry of Transportation of Ontario. 2010-01-01.
- Map 19 (PDF) (Map). 1 : 1,600,000. Official road map of Ontario. Ministry of Transportation of Ontario. 2010-01-01.
