= Gloucester Pool =

Lake in Georgian Bay Township, District of Muskoka, Ontario, Canada

- Location within Ontario
- Location: Georgian Bay Township, District of Muskoka, Severn Township, Simcoe County Ontario waterway is the boundary line
- Coordinates: 44.848°N 79.701°W
- Primary inflows: The Severn River from Big Chute and at Whites Falls from Six Mile Lake
- Primary outflows: via Little Lake at Port Severn into Georgian Bay and via Baxter Lake into Georgian Bay
- Catchment area: part of the Trent Severn Waterway system
- Basin countries: Canada
- Max. depth: 107 ft (33 m)
- Shore length^{1}: mix of pine, oak and maple forest, granite gentle and steep slopes
- ^{1} Shore length is not a well-defined measure.

Gloucester Pool is a lake in Georgian Bay Township, District of Muskoka, Ontario, Canada. It is approximately 5 km northeast of the town of Port Severn.

== See also ==
- List of lakes in Ontario
