= Big Willow River =

- Location of the river mouth in Ontario

Location
- Country: Canada
- Province: Ontario
- Region: Northwestern Ontario
- District: Kenora

Physical characteristics
- Source
  - coordinates: 52°19′41″N 82°24′37″W
  - elevation: 42 m (138 ft)
- Mouth: James Bay
  - coordinates: 52°40′41″N 81°53′29″W
  - elevation: 0 m (0 ft)

Basin features
- River system: James Bay drainage basin

The Big Willow River is a river in northeastern Kenora District in northwestern Ontario, Canada. It is a tributary of James Bay.

The Big Willow River begins in muskeg and flows north-northeast to its mouth at James Bay.

== Sources ==
- "Big Willow River" at Atlas of Canada. Accessed 2016-04-24.
- Map 18 (PDF) (Map). 1 : 1,600,000. Official road map of Ontario. Ministry of Transportation of Ontario. 2014.
