= Unnamed lake =

Lake with no official name

An unnamed lake is a body of water with no official or generally agreed-upon name. Such a lake is officially nameless though it may have one or more unofficial names used locally. This is common for many tiny lakes, farm ponds, and minor lakes in remote areas.

== Designated ==
A lake designated as unnamed can be distinguished from a lake actually named Unnamed Lake by its capitalization. Some lakes named the latter are:

- northwestern Montana, U.S. 47.756°N 113.069°W
- northeastern West Virginia, U.S. 39.553°N 78.260°W, which has been re-designated by GNIS as Unnamed Lake on Tr-Sleepy Creek Dam.
