= Great Lakes Basin =

Large drainage basin around the Great Lakes

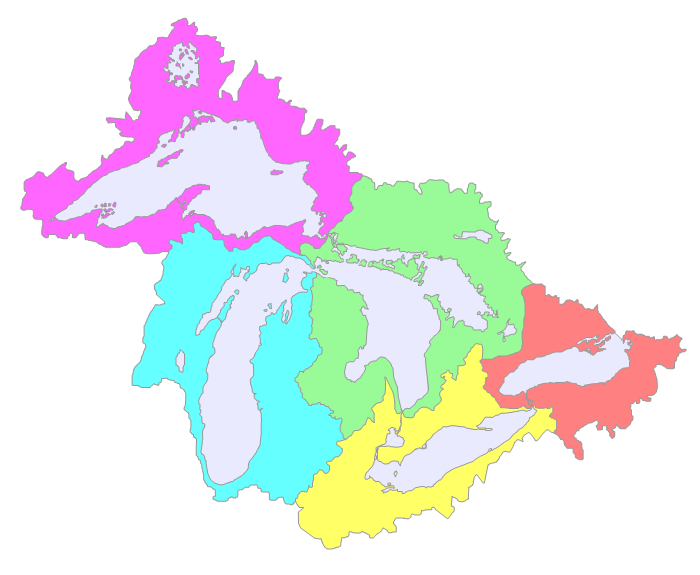
A map of the Great Lakes Basin showing the five sub-basins within. Left to right they are: Superior (magenta); Michigan (cyan); Huron (pale green); Erie (yellow); Ontario (light coral).

The Great Lakes Basin consists of the Great Lakes and the surrounding lands of the states of Illinois, Indiana, Michigan, Minnesota, New York, Ohio, Pennsylvania, and Wisconsin in the United States, and the province of Ontario in Canada, whose direct surface runoff and watersheds form a large drainage basin that feeds into the lakes. It is generally considered to also include a small area around and beyond Wolfe Island, Ontario, at the east end of Lake Ontario, which does not directly drain into the Great Lakes, but into the Saint Lawrence River.

The Basin is at the center of the Great Lakes region.

== Demographics ==
The basin is home to 37 million people. It hosts seven of Canada's 20 largest census metropolitan areas, namely Toronto, Hamilton, Kitchener–Cambridge–Waterloo, London, St. Catharines–Niagara, Windsor, and Oshawa. Also, the American cities of Duluth, Milwaukee, Chicago, Gary, Detroit, Toledo, Cleveland, Erie, Buffalo, Rochester, and Syracuse, among others, are located in the basin.

== Sub-basins ==
Each individual lake forms a sub-basin, such as the Lake Erie Basin, and each sub-basin consists of multiple watersheds, such as Pennsylvania's Lake Erie Watershed. The overall Great Lakes Basin is monitored by the binational Great Lakes Commission.

== St. Lawrence Basin ==
Quebec, a portion of whose lands drain into the St. Lawrence Basin, is a signatory to the Great Lakes Charter of 1985, the 2001 Charter Annex, and the Agreements of 2005. While not a part of the Great Lakes Basin, Quebec's position along the Saint Lawrence Seaway makes it a partner in water resource management with Ontario and the eight US states mentioned above.

== See also ==
- Grand River
- Lake Ontario Waterkeeper
- List of prehistoric lakes
- Niagara River
- River basins in the United States
- Saint Lawrence River
- Speed River
- Watershed
