= McDowell Lake First Nation =

MacDowell Lake Mishi Sakahikaniing
- Indian settlement
- MacDowell Lake Indian Settlement
- Location within Ontario
- Coordinates: 52°13′N 92°44′W
- Country: Canada
- Province: Ontario
- District: Kenora
- First Nation: McDowell Lake

Area
  - Land: 1.94 km^{2} (0.75 sq mi)

Population (2024)
  - Total: 63
- Website: mcdowelllake.firstnation.ca

McDowell Lake First Nation (Oji-Cree: ᒥᔑ ᓴᑲᐦᐊᑲᓂᐣ Mishi Sakahikaniing) is a small Anisininew First Nation band government located in Northern Ontario, located approximately 155 km northeast of Red Lake, Ontario, Canada, on the central western shore of McDowell Lake. As of 2025, their total estimated population was 55. It is part of the Keewaytinook Okimakanak Council (Northern Chiefs) and the Nishnawbe Aski Nation.

The First Nation's MacDowell Lake Indian Settlement, also known as MacDowell Lake, Ontario, is accessible by float and ski equipped aircraft. Though no winter/ice roads connect this community in the winter, a person can use either snowmobiles or snowshoes to trail off from winter/ice roads and head towards the community. Nearest winter/ice roads from the community connect Red Lake, Ontario, to North Spirit Lake, Deer Lake, and Sandy Lake First Nations.

== History ==
The small community of Misi-zhaaga'iganiing was established by trapper Johnny Kenequanash in the 1940s on the central western shore of McDowell Lake, known in Oji-Cree language as Misi-zhaaga'igan, meaning "the grand lake." Misi-zhaaga'igan was the main water way for people travelling by canoes leading North to Windigo Lake or going east towards Cat Lake. Kenequanash and his family was soon joined by the James family. Most Band members were former North Caribou Lake (Weagamow Lake) members and also have close ties with Cat Lake members. For many years the prime economic activity is either trapping or commercial fishing. In 1985, McDowell Lake along with six other community was awarded official Band status. The Governments of Canada, Ontario, the Nishnawbe Aski Nation and six of its member First Nations (Aroland, Keewaywin, McDowell Lake, New Slate Falls, Saugeen, and Wawakapewin) signed an agreement in December 1991 to make lands available to establish Indian reserves in the six communities and to provide basic community facilities. In June 1992, the 4455 ha MacDowell Lake Indian Settlement was remitted, but Census Canada records only 2750 ha in 1996 and 1940 ha in 2006.

The community had to be evacuated during the 2026 Canadian wildfires.

== Government ==
=== Governance ===
The leadership of the First Nation is determined through a Custom Electoral System.

The First Nation is a member of Keewaytinook Okimakanak Council (Northern Chiefs), a local non-political Chiefs Council. McDowell Lake is also a member of the Nishnawbe Aski Nation, a Tribal Political Organization representing many of the First Nations in northern Ontario.
