= St. Raphael Provincial Park =

Provincial park in Ontario, Canada

- IUCN category II (national park)
- Location within Ontario
- Location: Kenora/Thunder Bay Districts, Ontario, Canada
- Coordinates: 50°46′02″N 90°54′06″W
- Area: 90,521 ha (349.50 sq mi)
- Designation: Waterway
- Established: 2003
- Named for: St. Raphael Lake
- Governing body: Ontario Parks
- Website: www.ontarioparks.com/park/straphael

St. Raphael Provincial Park is a provincial park in northern Ontario, Canada, roughly halfway between Sioux Lookout and Pickle Lake, straddling the boundary of Kenora and Thunder Bay Districts. It was established on May 22, 2003, and provides backcountry canoeing and camping opportunities.

It is a non-operating park, meaning that there are no facilities or services. Permitted activities include boating, canoeing, hiking, fishing, hunting, swimming, and backcountry camping, as well as dogsledding, snowmobiling, and snowshoeing in the winter. There is one commercial resort on De Lesseps Lake and a lodge on Hooker Lake.

== Description ==
St. Raphael Provincial Park is a circular waterway park that protects a series of interconnected lakes and the lands around them, ranging from 25 metres (82 ft) to over 2,000 metres (6,600 ft) in width. A few of the larger lakes which are completely inside the park are Churchill, De Lesseps, Hooker, Lawson, Minchin, Miniss, St. Raphael, and Vincent Lakes.

Its landscape is typical Canadian Shield with mostly sparse boreal forest, thin soil layers, and exposed granite bedrock. Eskers, drumlins, and ground moraines are found throughout the park. The lakeshores are characterized by bars, spits, tombolos, and wide sandy beaches. Other landscape features include raised bog, peat swamps, ladder fen, and shallow till plains.

Access to the park is via a boat launch on Minchin Lake and via the Payne River to Medcalf Lake, both accessible from Highway 599 which partially forms the park's eastern boundary. Canoes routes into the park are via Miniss Bay of Lake St. Joseph, Miniss River from Armit Lake, and Spirit Creek which is south of Spirit Lake. From these portages lead to the park's interior. The park can also be reached by floatplane.

The park surrounds 2 large enclaves that are part of the Miniss Enhanced Management Area (where logging and mining is permitted). This management area and the provincial park together constitute the St. Raphael Signature Site, which is recognized for its natural and recreational values. The Signature Site, covering more than 1,530 square kilometres (590 sq mi) of remote wilderness, limits development to maintain its remote character and to enhance woodland caribou habitats.

== Flora and fauna ==
Common trees in the park include black spruce, white spruce, white birch, jack pine, balsam fir, and trembling aspen. White pine and red pine (including some old-growth stands) are occasionally found since the park is at the northern limit of their range.

Animals found in the park include woodland caribou, moose, black bear, wolf, wolverine, pine marten, lynx, bald eagle, osprey, sandhill cranes, and various waterfowl. Among the fish species present in the lakes and rivers are yellow pickerel (walleye), northern pike, yellow perch, lake trout, and whitefish.
