= Casummit Creek =

- Location of the mouth of Casummit Creek in Ontario

Location
- Country: Canada
- Province: Ontario
- District: Kenora District

Physical characteristics
- Source: Casummit Lake
  - coordinates: 51°27′51″N 92°21′47″W
  - elevation: 391 m (1,283 ft)
- Mouth: Birch Lake
  - coordinates: 51°27′15″N 92°18′45″W
  - elevation: 388 m (1,273 ft)
- Length: 5 km (3.1 mi)

Basin features
- River system: James Bay drainage basin

Casummit Creek is a creek in Kenora District, Ontario, Canada. It flows 5 kilometres (3.1 mi) from Casummit Lake at an elevation of 391 metres (1,283 ft) to Birch Lake at an elevation of 388 metres (1,273 ft), whose waters flow via the Birch River, Cat River and Albany River into James Bay. There are three tributaries, all unnamed creeks, two from the left and one from the right. A portage leads from Birch Lake to just west of the Casummit Creek source point.

== See also ==
- List of rivers of Ontario
