= Casummit Lake (Ontario) =

Summit Lake
- Location in Ontario
- Location: Kenora District, Ontario
- Coordinates: 51°28′34″N 92°22′17″W
- Type: Lake
- Part of: James Bay drainage basin
- Primary inflows: Two unnamed creeks
- Primary outflows: Casummit Creek to Birch Lake
- Basin countries: Canada
- Max. length: 2.8 km (1.7 mi)
- Max. width: 2.7 km (1.7 mi)
- Surface elevation: 391 m (1,283 ft)
- Settlements: Casummit

Casummit Lake is a lake in Kenora District, Ontario, Canada, about 110 kilometres (68 mi) northeast of the community of Red Lake. The settlement of Casummit and a mine are on the northeast shore of the lake. A fishing outfitter has a cabin on the north shore of the lake.

== Hydrology ==
Summit Lake is about 2.8 kilometres (1.7 mi) long and 2.7 kilometres (1.7 mi) wide, and lies at an elevation of 391 metres (1,283 ft). There is a significant unnamed island in the centre of the lake. The inflows are two unnamed creeks, one at the northwest from Joneston Lake, the other at the northeast from Richardson Lake. The primary outflow is Casummit Creek, to Birch Lake, at the southeast end of the lake, whose waters flow via the Birch River, Cat River and Albany River into James Bay. A portage leads from just west of the Casummit Creek outlet also to Birch Lake.
