= De Lesseps Lake =

- Location in Ontario
- Location: Thunder Bay District, Ontario
- Coordinates: 50°42′00″N 90°42′23″W
- Type: Lake
- Primary inflows: De Lesseps River
- Primary outflows: De Lesseps River
- Basin countries: Canada
- Max. length: 25 kilometres (16 mi)
- Max. width: 11 kilometres (6.8 mi)
- Surface elevation: 378 metres (1,240 ft)

De Lesseps Lake is a lake in the Unorganized Part of Thunder Bay District in Northwestern Ontario, Canada. The lake is part of the James Bay drainage basin.

The major inflow, at the southwest, and outflow, at the north, is the De Lesseps River, which flows to Miniss Lake and then via the Miniss River, Lake St. Joseph and the Albany River to James Bay.

De Lesseps Lake Airport is located on the eastern shore of the lake.
