= Doghole River =

- Location of the mouth of the Doghole River in Ontario

Location
- Country: Canada
- Province: Ontario
- Region: Northwestern Ontario
- District: Kenora

Physical characteristics
- Source: Doghole Lake
  - coordinates: 51°12′56″N 90°16′24″W
  - elevation: 377 m (1,237 ft)
- Mouth: Lake St. Joseph
  - coordinates: 51°09′50″N 90°22′17″W
  - elevation: 374 m (1,227 ft)

Basin features
- River system: James Bay drainage basin

The Doghole River is a river in the Unorganized Part of Kenora District in Northwestern Ontario, Canada. The river is part of the James Bay drainage basin. It flows from Doghole Lake, where the outlet is part of the Mishkeegogamang First Nation Osnaburgh Indian Reserve No. 63B, to the northeast shore of Lake St. Joseph; oddly, the mouth is not on Doghole Bay, adjacent to the east. Lake St. Joseph is the source of the Albany River, which flows to James Bay.

== Sources ==
- Map 16 (PDF) (Map). 1 : 1,600,000. Official road map of Ontario. Ministry of Transportation of Ontario. 2014.
- Restructured municipalities - Ontario map #1 (Map). Restructuring Maps of Ontario. Ontario Ministry of Municipal Affairs and Housing. 2006. Archived from the original on 2012-05-05.
