= Doghole Lake =

- Location in Ontario
- Location: Kenora District, Ontario
- Coordinates: 51°14′03″N 90°15′45″W
- Type: Lake
- Primary inflows: Unnamed river from Annimwash Lake
- Primary outflows: Doghole River
- Basin countries: Canada
- Max. length: 4.3 kilometres (2.7 mi)
- Max. width: 3.1 kilometres (1.9 mi)
- Surface elevation: 377 metres (1,237 ft)

Doghole Lake is a lake in the Unorganized Part of Kenora District in Northwestern Ontario, Canada. The lake is part of the James Bay drainage basin, and is the source of the Doghole River, which flows to Lake St. Joseph, and then via the Albany River to James Bay. The majority of the lake is within the Mishkeegogamang First Nation Osnaburgh Indian Reserve No. 63B, whose main community is on the lake's eastern shore, adjacent to Ontario Highway 599.

== See also ==
- List of lakes in Ontario
