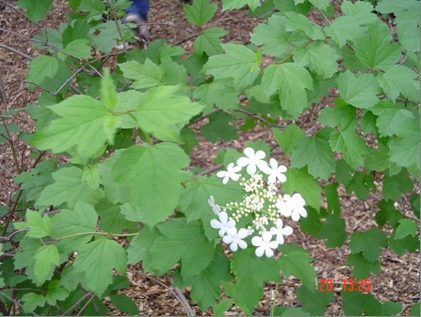

Scientific classification
- Kingdom: Plantae
- Clade: Tracheophytes
- Clade: Angiosperms
- Clade: Eudicots
- Clade: Asterids
- Order: Dipsacales
- Family: Adoxaceae
- Genus: Viburnum
- Species: V. trilobum

Binomial name
- Viburnum trilobum Marshall
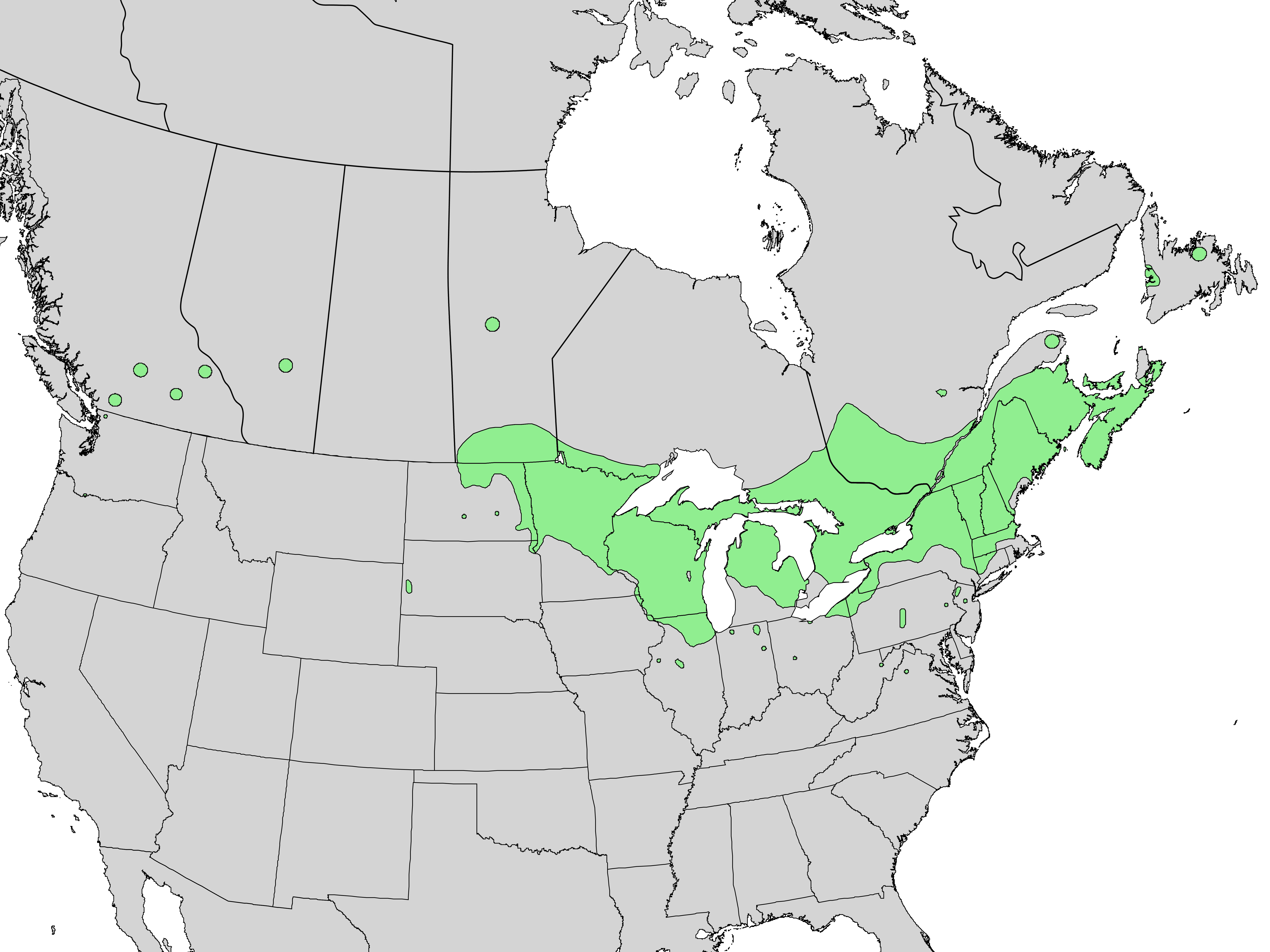
- Natural range of Viburnum trilobum

= Viburnum trilobum =

Species of fruit and plant

Viburnum trilobum (cranberrybush viburnum, American cranberrybush, high bush cranberry, or highbush cranberry) is a species of Viburnum native to northern North America, from Newfoundland west to British Columbia, south to Washington state and east to northern Virginia. It is very closely related to the European and Asian Viburnum opulus, and is often treated as a variety of it, as Viburnum opulus L. var. americanum Ait., or as a subspecies, Viburnum opulus subsp. trilobum (Marshall) Clausen.

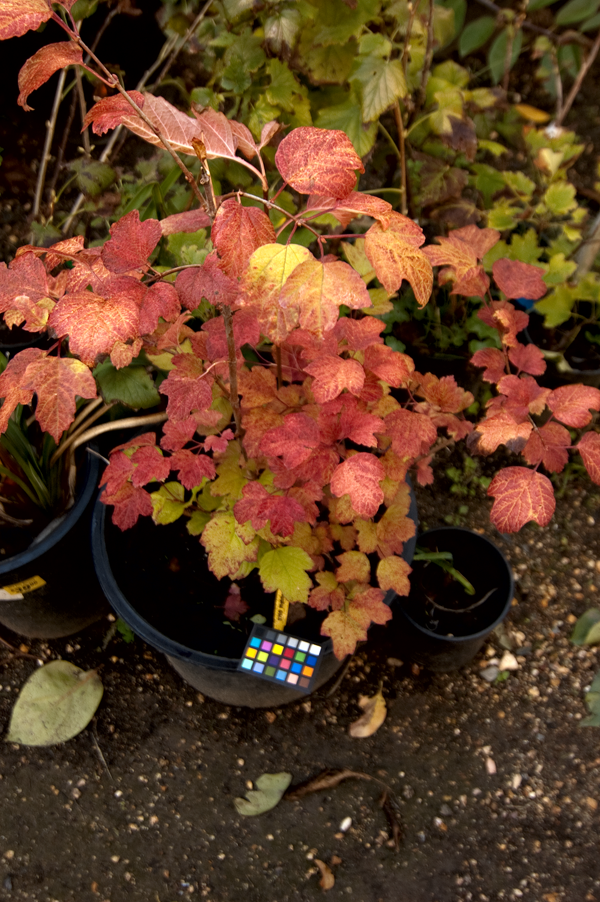
Fall foliage

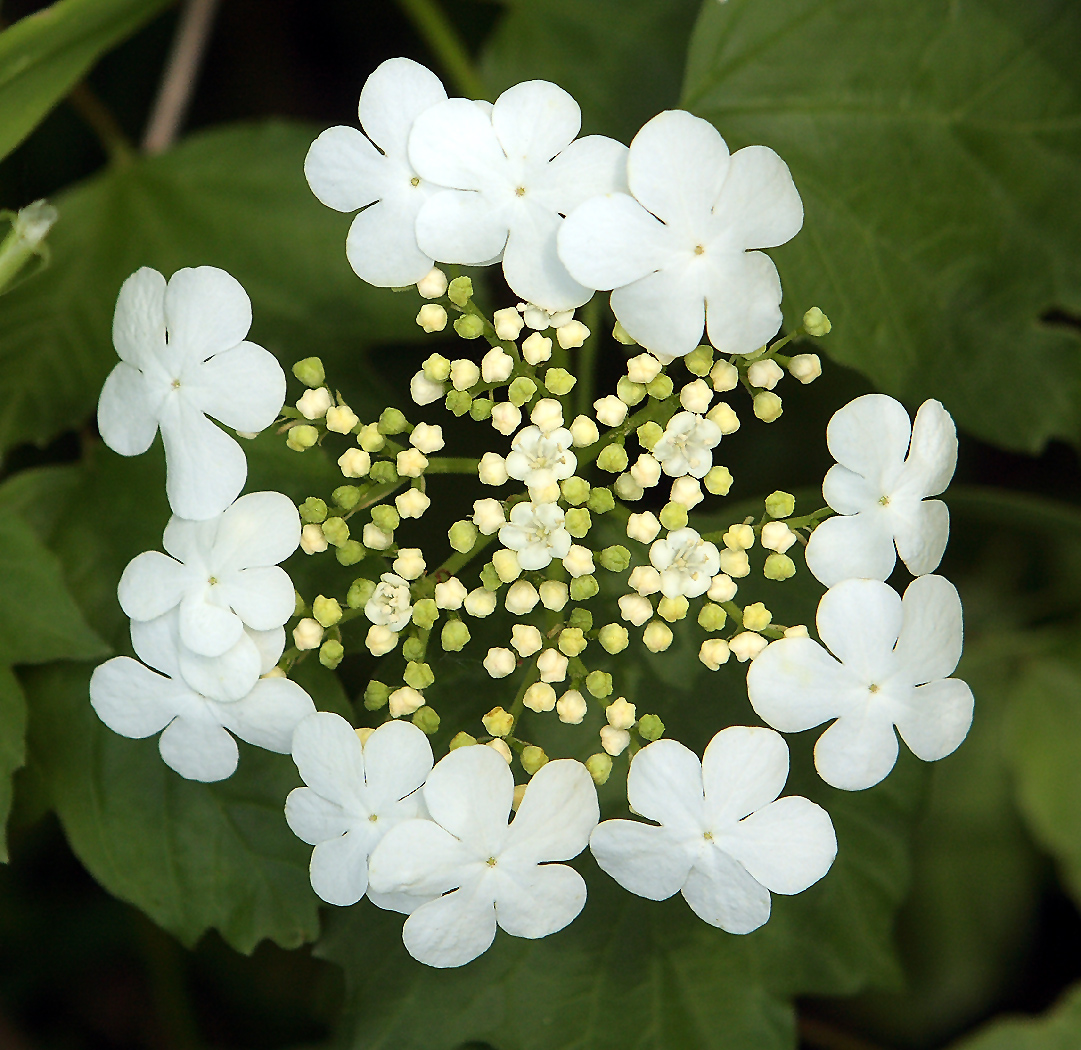
Detail of the inflorescence

== Description ==
It is a deciduous shrub growing to 4 m (13 ft) tall. The bark is gray and rough and has a scaly texture. The stems arch and are very dense, and the twigs are a reddish-brown color. The leaves are opposite, three-lobed, 6–12 cm (2 1/4–4 3/4 in) long and 5–10 cm (2–4 in) broad, with a rounded base and serrated margins; they are superficially similar to many maple leaves, most easily distinguished by their somewhat wrinkled surface with impressed leaf venation. The leaf buds are green. The bud scales are valvate. The flowers are white, produced in corymbs up to 13 cm (5 in) in diameter at the top of the stems; each corymb comprises a ring of outer sterile flowers 2–2.5 cm (3/4–1 in) diameter with conspicuous petals, surrounding a center of small (5 mm, 0.20 in), fertile flowers; the flowers are pollinated by insects. The fruit is an oblong red drupe 15 mm (0.59 in) long and 12 mm (0.47 in) broad, containing a single flat, white seed. Plants begin to produce fruit at approximately five years of age; when animals, including birds, eat the fruits, they deposit the seeds in another location in their droppings.

== Uses ==
Although often called "highbush cranberry", it is not a cranberry. The name comes from the red fruits which look superficially like cranberries, and have a similar flavor and ripen at the same time of year. After removing the large seeds, the fruits, sour and rich in vitamin C, can be eaten raw or cooked into a sauce to serve with meat or game.

== Pests and diseases ==
The larvae and adults of the viburnum leaf beetle feed on the leaves and may completely defoliate the plant. Repeated damage can kill the plant.

== In culture ==
This is a commonly used berry in western Canadian cultures. Peoples of various origins both Native and European have used the berries for many years.

The Canadian French name for the berries is pembina. The name pembina was then applied to three rivers, one in Manitoba and North Dakota, one in Ontario, and one in Alberta.

== Medicinal ==
Viburnum trilobum is used interchangeably with V. opulus under the common name Cramp Bark. As the common name suggests the bark is used to treat uterine cramps as well as dysmenorrhea, PMS, cramps of other smooth muscles including intestines, and some symptoms of miscarriage. Its antispasmodic qualities are often attributed to the presence of valerenic acid.
