= Bone folder =

Tool

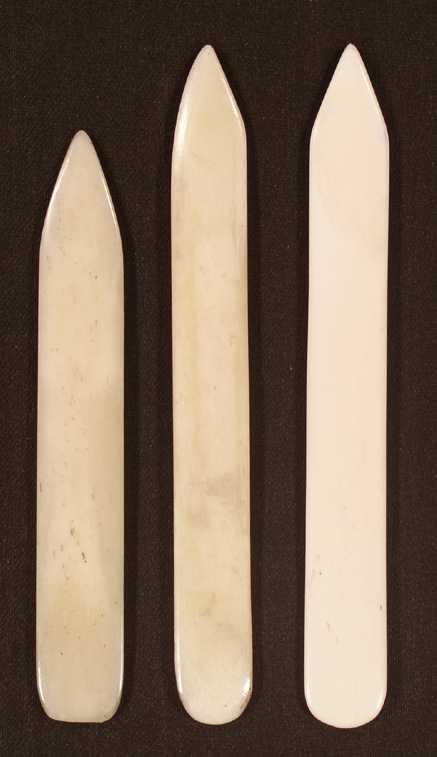
Bone folders

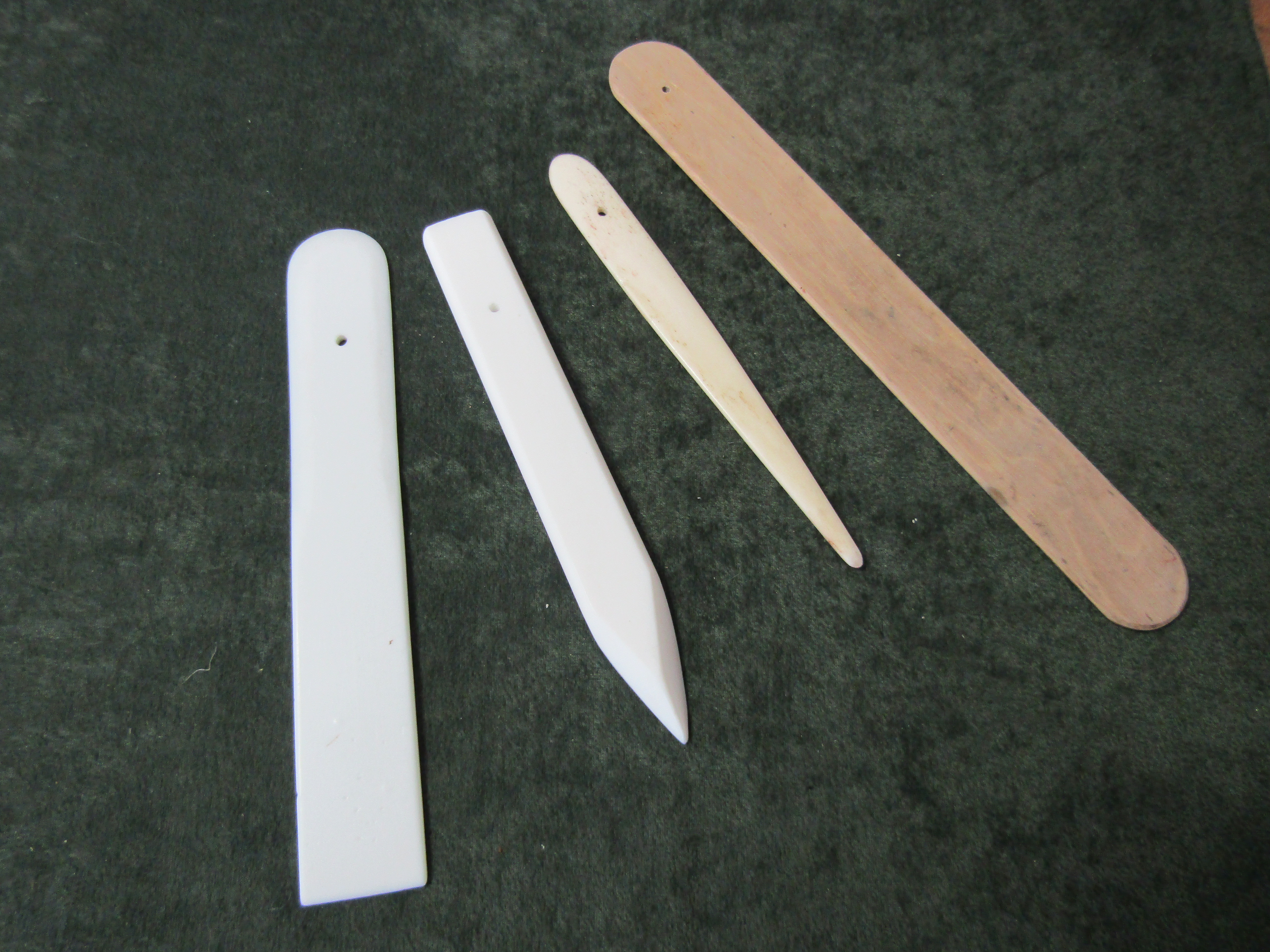
Bone folders made of (L-R) Teflon, teflon, bone and wood

A bone folder, bonefolder, or folding bone is a dull-edged hand tool used in the creation of sharp creases and folds in paper crafts such as bookbinding, cardmaking and origami, as well as in letter writing.

Bone folders can be made out of bone (presumably the leg bone of a cow, deer, or similar animal), ivory or plastic. Those made from bone may be less likely to leave residue on the workpiece.

In Japan, the equivalent folding tool is traditionally made from bamboo, although alternatives include a Japanese fabric marking tool (hera) and a Western bone folder.

== See also ==
- Brayer
