= Cat Lake =

Cat Lake may refer to:

- Cat Lake (Ontario), a Canadian lake
- Cat Lake Airport, a Canadian airport operated by the Government of Ontario
- Cat Lake First Nation, Ontario, Canada
