= St. Raphael River =

- Location of the mouth of the St. Raphael River in Ontario

Location
- Country: Canada
- Province: Ontario
- Region: Northwestern Ontario
- District: Thunder Bay

Physical characteristics
- Source: Aki Lake
  - coordinates: 50°32′46″N 90°08′10″W
  - elevation: 398 m (1,306 ft)
- Mouth: Miniss River
  - coordinates: 50°54′53″N 90°54′49″W
  - elevation: 377 m (1,237 ft)

Basin features
- River system: James Bay drainage basin

The St. Raphael River is a river in the Unorganized Part of Thunder Bay District in Northwestern Ontario, Canada. The river is part of the James Bay drainage basin and is a left tributary of the Miniss River.

The river begins at Aki Lake and flows north to St. Raphael Lake, then northwest to Churchill Lake. It heads northeast from the lake and reaches its mouth at the Miniss River. The Miniss River flows to Lake St. Joseph, then via the Albany River to James Bay.

== Tributaries ==
- Quaint Creek (right)
- Spirit Creek (left)
- Cal Creek (right)

== Sources ==
- Map 16 (PDF) (Map). 1 : 1,600,000. Official road map of Ontario. Ministry of Transportation of Ontario. 2014.
- Restructured municipalities - Ontario map #1 (Map). Restructuring Maps of Ontario. Ontario Ministry of Municipal Affairs and Housing. 2006.
