= Mattawasaga River =

Coordinates: 48°36′10″N 79°29′40″W

- Location of the mouth in Ontario

Location
- Country: Canada
- Province: Ontario
- District: Cochrane

Physical characteristics
- Source: Creek in forest area
  - location: Cochrane District, Ontario, Canada
  - elevation: 314 m (1,030 ft)
- Mouth: Abitibi Lake
  - location: Harker Township, Cochrane District, Ontario, Canada
  - coordinates
  - elevation: 272 m (892 ft)

Basin features
- Tributaries
  - left: Holloway Lake discharge, Imperial Lake discharge
  - right: Yelle Lake discharge

The Mattawasaga River is a tributary of Abitibi Lake, flowing through the townships of Harker Township, Marriott Township and Stoughton Township, in the Cochrane District, in Ontario, in Canada.

The Mattawasaga River flows entirely into forest land near the Quebec border in the Cochrane District. Forestry is the main economic activity of this hydrographic slope; recreational tourism activities, second.

The Mattawasaga River is served by Highway 101 (East-West), which runs along the north side of the upper partaway of the river, then the south side eastward.

Annually, the surface of the river is usually frozen from mid-November to mid-April, but safe circulation on ice generally occurs from mid-December to late March.

== Geography ==
The Mattawasaga River originates from a mountain stream (altitude: 314 metres (1,030 ft)) in Cochrane District, in northeastern Ontario.

The main hydrographic slopes adjacent to the Mattawasaga River are:

- North side: Abitibi Lake;
- East side: Quebec River, Duparquet River;
- South side: Misena River, Marriott Creek, Magusi River;
- West side: Lightning River, Cochrane District, Ghost River.

From the source, the Mattawasaga River flows on 39.9 kilometres (24.8 mi), according to these segments:

- 5.3 kilometres (3.3 mi) to the north, west, then north again, to a creek (from the west);
- 2.8 kilometres (1.7 mi) northeast to the limit of the township of Holloway;
- 12.2 kilometres (7.6 mi) eastward in the Township of Holloway, winding up to a river bend;
- 8.3 kilometres (5.2 mi) to the east, then north to Marriot Township and along the northern side of Route 101, winding up the boundary of the Township of Stoughton;
- 8.8 kilometres (5.5 mi) northward in Stoughton Township, forming a large loop westward to a stream (coming from the east and draining an area in the direction of Quebec);
- 2.5 kilometres (1.6 mi) northwest up to the mouth.

The mouth of the Mattawasaga River is located at:

- 19.3 kilometres (12.0 mi) west of the mouth of the Duparquet River;
- 2.9 kilometres (1.8 mi) west of the border of Quebec;
- 49.6 kilometres (30.8 mi) southeast of the mouth of Abitibi Lake (in Ontario);
- 55.3 kilometres (34.4 mi) to the north-west of downtown Rouyn-Noranda;
- 60.2 kilometres (37.4 mi) northeast of the center of the Kirkland Lake village.

The Mattawasaga River is discharged on the south shore of Boundary Bay on the south shore of Abitibi Lake. From there, the current crosses Abitibi Lake to the west, bypassing two large peninsulas advancing towards the north.

From the mouth of Abitibi Lake, the current flows through the Abitibi River and Moose River (Ontario) to the south shore of the James Bay.

== See also ==
- Abitibi Lake, a body of water
- Abitibi River, a watercourse
- Moose River (Ontario), a watercourse
- Cochrane District, an Ontario district
- List of rivers of Ontario
