= Root River (Kenora District) =

- Location of the mouth of the Root River in Ontario

Location
- Country: Canada
- Province: Ontario
- Region: Northwestern Ontario
- District: Kenora

Physical characteristics
- Source: Unnamed lake
  - coordinates: 50°46′12″N 92°06′48″W
  - elevation: 442 m (1,450 ft)
- Mouth: Lac Seul
  - coordinates: 50°40′07″N 91°41′55″W
  - elevation: 357 m (1,171 ft)

Basin features
- River system: Hudson Bay drainage basin

The Root River is a river in the Unorganized Part of Kenora District in Northwestern Ontario, Canada. The river is part of the Hudson Bay drainage basin, is a tributary of Lac Seul, and serves as the conduit for waters diverted from Lake St. Joseph, the source of the Albany River in the adjacent James Bay drainage basin.

== Course ==
The river begins at an unnamed lake and heads east then northeast to Otatakan Lake, where it takes in the left tributary Wesley River. It flows east, takes in the diverted waters from Lake St. Joseph as a left tributary, then turns south, passes over the Nattaway Falls, and reaches Adamhay Lake. The river heads west, and reaches its mouth at Anenimus Bay on Lac Seul. Lac Seul flows via the English River, Winnipeg River and Nelson River to Hudson Bay.

== Tributaries ==
- Dunbar Creek (left)
- Deadhead Creek (right)
- Dagmar Creek (left)
- Free Creek (left)
- Ecar Creek (left)
- Under Creek (left)
- Lynxpaw Creek (right)
- Diversion channel from Lake St. Joseph (left)
- Wesley River (left)
- Sharp Creek (left)

== Sources ==
- Map 16 (PDF) (Map). 1 : 1,600,000. Official road map of Ontario. Ministry of Transportation of Ontario. 2014.
- Restructured municipalities - Ontario map #2 (Map). Restructuring Maps of Ontario. Ontario Ministry of Municipal Affairs and Housing. 2006.
