= Ghost River =

Ghost River may refer to:

== Settlements ==
- In Canada
  - Ghost River, Cochrane District, Ontario
  - Ghost River, Kenora District, Ontario

== Rivers ==
- Ghost River (Alberta), in Canada.
- a section of the Wolf River (Tennessee), in the United States

== Music ==
- "Ghost River", a song by Finnish symphonic metal band Nightwish from their 2011 album, Imaginaerum
