= Lungkeng =

Archaeological site in Pingtung, Taiwan

Lungkeng (Mandarin: 龍坑考古遺址; pinyin: lóng kēng kǎo gǔ yí zhǐ) is an archaeological site near the village of Ehluan in Hengchun Township, Taiwan. It dates to the pre-ceramic period, 5,000 to 6,000 years ago.

== Geography ==
Lungkeng is located on a coral reef plateau rising on the eastern shore of the Ehluanpi Peninsula, at the southernmost point of Taiwan. A notch of a coral reef that runs from the east to the west on the plateau is where the site is located, and it's at an altitude of 8 meters. Two kilometers away from the west is the Oluanpi second archaeological site, which is another site dating to the pre-ceramic period on the Hengchun Peninsula in addition to Lungkeng site. The major deposit at the site is laterite. Based on the residual laterite deposits from the limestone gaps of the coral reefs and the current height of the remains, the laterite deposits may have reached a height of 6 meters above surface. The site is facing the Pacific Ocean with stable and abundant freshwater resources nearby. The water source is at a limestone landform formed from coral reefs with rainwater seepage at the northern shore of the reef notch 60 meters away.

== History of research ==
The site was discovered by Li Kuang-Chou et al. on August 16, 1984, and a trial excavation was conducted on September 6 of the same year. Later, there were no further trial excavations, but investigations were active. Based on their research results, the area of the site is approximately 20x20 m^{2}. The team set up two trail excavation pits in proximity to the coral reef notch due to the high density of artifacts. The pits were at the due north and due south locations, with an area of 2x2 m^{2}, respectively. The total area of the trial excavation was 8 m^{2}.

== Research results ==
=== Unearthed Artifacts ===
The artifacts collected from the surface and excavation include a lithic cutting tool (1 piece), lithic flakes (3 pieces), lithic waste (2 pieces), a bone chisel (1 piece), shell scrapers (13 pieces), tons of seashells, turtle shells, animal bones, and animal teeth.

=== Technology Development and Industries ===
Chipped gravels were the primary lithic flakes in this culture, and scraping and polishing techniques had been applied to bone tools. Hunting and gathering were the main source of subsistence. Based on the animal remains, the people might have lived primarily by gathering, followed by hunting and then fishing. Shell scrapers were abundant in specific regions, and continued to be used in the historical period.

=== Culture Type ===
The results of trial excavations at Lungkeng and Ohluanpi archaeological sites demonstrate that the pre-ceramic period and Neolithic Period are not a continuum according to the stratigraphy, with differences in cultural development. As the C-14 dates show that the pre-ceramic layer was in the Holocene Period, Li Kuang-Chou called it "Culture Continued from the Late Paleolithic Age" instead of the Paleolithic period.

=== Dating ===
Only one result of C-14 dating for Lungkeng site has been published. The date from seashells is 5560±90 B.P., calibrated as 6385±170 B.P. through tree-ring dating.
