= Abe Kakepetum =

Canadian Anishinaabe painter (1944–2019)

Abe Kakepetum (September 12, 1944 – January 5, 2019) was a Canadian Anishinaabe painter, who began painting at age nine. Kakepetum was born in Sandy Lake First Nation in northwest Ontario, Canada and a member of Keewaywin First Nation. His artistic production mirrors his culture's faith. Kakepetum was also a vocalist, recording a number of gospel albums.

Kakepetum primary medium is acrylic on canvas, Arches paper although he is not limited to these materials. He has designed original art on Beaver skulls, on wooden plates and on jewelry made of antlers. Kakepetum has produced limited edition prints which all bear the seal of his company Kakekay Fine Arts. He developed his art and taught others about the spiritual meanings and traditional beliefs of his Aboriginal culture.

Kakepetum worked closely with Toronto designer Linda Lundstrom to create designs for her La Parka line of clothing.
