= Osnaburgh 63A =

- Indian reserve
- Osnaburgh 63A Indian Reserve
- Location within Ontario
- Coordinates: 51°04′N 90°16′W
- Country: Canada
- Province: Ontario
- District: Thunder Bay
- First Nation: Mishkeegogamang

Area
  - Land: 41.79 km^{2} (16.14 sq mi)

Population (2011)
  - Total: 153
  - Density: 3.7/km^{2} (9.6/sq mi)
- Website: www.mishkeegogamang.ca

Osnaburgh 63A is a First Nations reserve on Lake St. Joseph in Thunder Bay District, Ontario. It is one of the reserves of the Mishkeegogamang First Nation, alongside Osnaburgh 63B.

Osnaburgh 63A is made up of three separate areas known as Ace Lake, Eric Lake, Ten Houses.
