= De Lesseps River =

- Location of the mouth of the De Lesseps River in Ontario

Location
- Country: Canada
- Province: Ontario
- Region: Northwestern Ontario
- District: Thunder Bay

Physical characteristics
- Source: Unnamed lake
  - coordinates: 50°34′04″N 90°50′23″W
  - elevation: 435 m (1,427 ft)
- Mouth: Miniss River
  - coordinates: 50°49′27″N 90°41′28″W
  - elevation: 379 m (1,243 ft)

Basin features
- River system: James Bay drainage basin

The De Lesseps River is a river in the Unorganized Part of Thunder Bay District in Northwestern Ontario, Canada. The river is part of the James Bay drainage basin and is a right tributary of the Miniss River.

The river begins at an unnamed lake and heads east then northeast to De Lesseps Lake, where De Lesseps Lake Airport is located on the eastern shore. It leaves the lake north, and reaches its mouth at Miniss Lake on the Miniss River. The Miniss River flows to Lake St. Joseph, then via the Albany River to James Bay.

== Sources ==
- Map 16 (PDF) (Map). 1 : 1,600,000. Official road map of Ontario. Ministry of Transportation of Ontario. 2014.
- Restructured municipalities - Ontario map #1 (Map). Restructuring Maps of Ontario. Ontario Ministry of Municipal Affairs and Housing. 2006. Archived from the original on 2012-05-05.
