= Jack Fiddler =

Chief and shaman

- Born: 1839; Rupert's Land, British North America
- Died: September 30, 1907 (aged 67–68); Norway House, Manitoba, Canada
- Known for: Being charged with the murder of a supposed wendigo

Zhauwuno-geezhigo-gaubow also known as Jack Fiddler (from the Oji-Cree: Zhaawano-giizhigo-gaabaw meaning "He who stands in the southern sky") and as Maisaninnine or Mesnawetheno (in Swampy Cree meaning "Stylish man") (c. 1839 – September 30, 1907), was an ogimaa (chief and shaman) of the Sucker doodem (clan) among the Anishinaabe in what is now northwestern Ontario. His arrest in 1906 for the alleged murder of a wendigo and his suicide before trial marked the beginning of the imposition of Canadian law on the Sucker People. Until then, Fiddler's people had been among the last aboriginal peoples living in North America completely under their own law and custom.

== Background ==
Zhauwuno-geezhigo-gaubow was born in the boreal forests of the upper Severn River near Sandy Lake, Deer Lake, and North Spirit Lake in the 1830s or 1840s. His father Peemeecheekag (Porcupine [Standing] Sideways), a mysterious figure from the east who was adopted into the Sucker clan during the previous century, was a respected political and spiritual leader. The Suckers were not the only group in the area, as they were allied with the Pelican and Sturgeon clans, and had contact with the Cranes as well. The clans spoke a unique form of the Oji-Cree dialect of the Anishinaabe language and had contact with the Ojibwa at Lake Winnipeg and the Oji-Cree farther to the north and east.

Zhauwuno-geezhigo-gaubow grew up during a period of difficulty. Over-trapping for the fur trade of the previous centuries had left the boreal forests of Northern Ontario depleted of animals. With declining numbers of furs, lower demand abroad, and more opportunities in the west, the Hudson's Bay Company (HBC) abandoned their post at Island Lake for much of the early 19th century, forcing the Suckers to travel to Big Trout Lake or Little Grand Rapids for trade. As a young man, Zhauwuno-geezhigo-gaubow likely worked on the York boats bringing furs to York Factory.

By the 1860s, the number of fur-bearing animals increased enough for the HBC to re-open the Island Lake post, and Zhauwuno-geezhigo-gaubow emerged as one of the leaders of the Sucker people. At his brief visits at the posts, he developed the ability to fiddle and built quality instruments. HBC traders frequently gave English nicknames to individual Natives and designated whole clans by the name of a primary leader or an arbitrary English surname. Thus, the Sturgeons were known to traders (and later Canadian authorities) by the surname Rae or Mamakeesick, the Pelicans after their leader Meekis, and the Cranes after their leaders Kakegamic and Kakepetum. Zhauwuno-geezhigo-gaubow and his brother Pesequan became Jack and Joseph Fiddler, and the Suckers often appear in the records as the Fiddler tribe.

Jack Fiddler took five wives: Kakakwesic, Nakwasasive, Nocome, Kaopasanakitiyat, and Kayakatopicicikec and had 13 children. Polygamy was common, out of necessity if for no other reason, as young men died often in the dangers of the times.

== The wendigo ==
Like his father before him, Jack Fiddler became a famous shaman for his alleged ability to conjure animals and protect his people from spells. Most importantly to the people of the region, he could allegedly successfully defeat the wendigo, a cannibalistic spirit that would possess people during all-too-frequent bouts of famine and disease. In his life, Jack Fiddler claimed to have defeated fourteen wendigos. Apparently some were sent against his people by enemy shamans, and others were members of his own band who were taken with an insatiable, incurable desire to eat human flesh. In the latter case, Fiddler was usually asked by family members to kill a very sick loved one before they turned wendigo. In some cases, the "Wendigo" him or herself would ask to be euthanized according to the necessary rites. Fiddler's own brother, Peter Flett, was killed after the food ran out on a trading expedition.

HBC traders, Cree, and missionaries were well aware of the Wendigo legend, though they often explained it as mental illness or superstition. Jack Fiddler's reputation also grew among these groups, and he was approached multiple times by Cree ministers at Island Lake and asked to bring Christianity to his people. Though he respectfully heard their requests, Fiddler did not convert. By the beginning of the 20th century, the Sucker people were among the only Indigenous people in North America living in a traditional manner with almost no government imposition on legal and religious matters.

== Arrest and trial ==
In early 1907, two members of the North-West Mounted Police visiting Island Lake heard of Jack Fiddler's power against the wendigo from Norman Rae, an in-law of the Fiddlers. Seeking to introduce Canadian law in the North, the Mounties went to the Sucker camp at Deer Lake and arrested Jack and Joseph Fiddler for murder. Before leaving, they took an eyewitness and declared that each man must give up any extra wives. For most of the Sucker people, the Mounties were the first whites they had ever seen.

The elderly brothers were charged with murdering Wahsakapeequay, Joseph's daughter-in-law, the year before. They were held at Norway House to await trial. Meanwhile, newspapers across Canada picked up the story and printed sensational headlines of murder and devil-worship. Across the country, people demanded convictions, while the police conducting the trial saw an opportunity for fame and advancement.

On September 30, Jack Fiddler escaped captivity during a walk outside. He hanged himself nearby and was found dead later in the day.

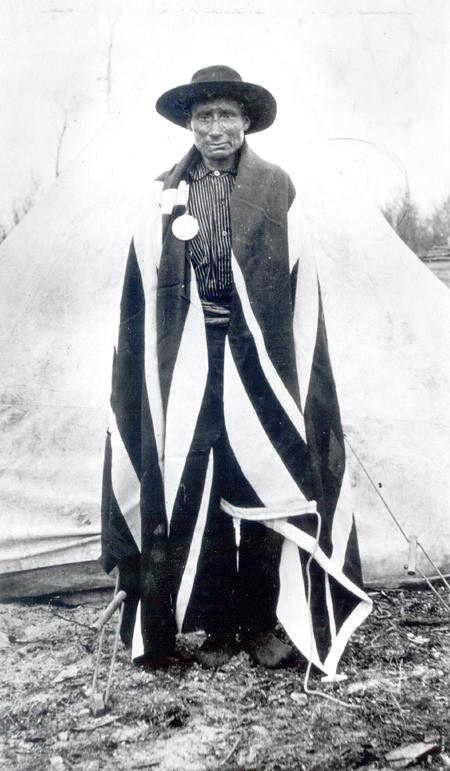
Robert Fiddler, son of Jack Fiddler and successor as chief of the Sucker people

Joseph Fiddler still went to trial, however. Angus Rae, the eyewitness, testified that Wahsakapeequay was killed while in deep pain and incurably sick according to the custom of the people who were not aware of Canadian law. Pressed on the wendigo issues, Rae admitted that it was a belief among his people and that Jack and Joseph were the ones who were usually asked to euthanize the very sick and prevent wendigos. Despite some other unreliable testimony from Rae, and the pleas of missionaries and HBC traders, Joseph was convicted and sentenced to death by Aylesworth Perry, the stipendary magistrate. Further appeals secured his release, but the order came three days after his death in 1909.

== Aftermath ==
Without their most prominent leaders, the people of the upper Severn River had no choice but to accept government rule. Robert Fiddler, Jack's son, signed an addition to Treaty 5 as "chief of the Deer Lake Band" in 1910 and chose to settle at Deer Lake. Later, several families including the Fiddlers, moved to Sandy Lake and became part of Treaty 9.

Today, most of the descendants of Jack Fiddler live in the Sandy Lake First Nation with others at the Deer Lake First Nation, and North Spirit Lake First Nation in Ontario, and the three reserves at Island Lake in Manitoba.

== Books ==
- Fiddler, Thomas and James R. Stevens, Killing the Shamen (Manotick, Ontario: Penumbra Press, 1985)
- Stevens, James R. (1994). "Zhauwuno Geezhigo Gaubow (aka Jack Fiddler)". In Cook, Ramsay; Hamelin, Jean (eds.). Dictionary of Canadian Biography. Vol. XIII (1901–1910) (online ed.). University of Toronto Press.

== See also ==
- Modern witch-hunts
- Sandy Lake First Nation
- Witch smeller
- Wendigo
