= Deer Lake First Nation =

Deer Lake
- Indian reserve
- Deer Lake Indian Reserve
- Location within Ontario Location within Canada
- Coordinates: 52°38′N 94°05′W
- Country: Canada
- Province: Ontario
- District: Kenora
- First Nation: Deer Lake

Area
  - Land: 17.85 km^{2} (6.89 sq mi)

Population (2011)
  - Total: 763
  - Density: 42.7/km^{2} (111/sq mi)
- Website: deerlake.firstnation.ca

Deer Lake First Nation (Oji-Cree: ᐊᑎᑯ ᓴᑲᐦᐃᑲᐣ) is an Anisininew First Nations band government in Northern Ontario, located north of Red Lake, Ontario, Canada. It is one of the few First Nations in Ontario to have signed Treaty 5. It is part of the Keewaytinook Okimakanak Council (Northern Chiefs) and the Nishnawbe Aski Nation. As of December 2007, the First Nation had 1,072 registered members, of which their on-reserve population was 868.

Deer Lake is policed by the Nishnawbe-Aski Police Service, an Aboriginal-based service.

== Language ==
The people of Deer Lake are closely related to the people of Sandy Lake First Nation and North Spirit Lake First Nation. The three reserves speak a unique dialect of the Anishinaabe language commonly known as Oji-Cree language.

In the local language, the people of Deer Lake call themselves Anishinawbe. In English Anisininew is becoming the most popular self-designation, while Oji-Cree and Cree remain popular as well. Ojibway is rarely used except to refer to the Native people to the south.

Indigenous and Northern Affairs Canada data from 2001 reported that 68% of Deer Lakers learned their native language as their first language with the rest speaking English first. Public conversation is heard in both languages with the oldest members using native language almost exclusively, and the youngest members using almost only English. Most adults comfortably navigate between the two, while younger adults and teenagers comprehend the language but rarely speak it. To reverse the trend of language loss, local education efforts have implemented native-language immersion programs in the preschool, kindergarten, and early-elementary grades.

Literacy in the native language using Cree syllabics is also emphasized by the local school and churches. Since the coming of Christianity and syllabic bibles in the early 20th century, Deer Lake has used its own version of the western variant of syllabics in which the "s", "sh", "z", and "zh" sounds are combined into one set of characters and some of the finals are different from the more commonly found versions in Ontario and Manitoba.

== Reserve ==
The 1,653.6 ha (4,086 acres) Deer Lake Reserve is within the boundaries of the territory described by Treaty 5. The community of Deer Lake is located on this reserve. It is connected to Pikangikum First Nation, Sandy Lake First Nation, and North Spirit Lake First Nation by winter/ice roads. Regularly scheduled flights to and from the community are provided by Wasaya Airways.

== History until colonization ==
Traditionally, the people of the Deer Lake area were semi-nomadic; like all Anishinaabe peoples, they organized themselves by doodem (clan). Small groups maintained seasonal camps based on family and clan and moved around according to where the hunting and fishing was best. When the Hudson's Bay Company established fur trade posts at what is now Kitchenuhmaykoosib Inninuwug First Nation on Big Trout Lake and Island Lake on Island Lake in the 18th century, traditional patterns of living changed little with an increased emphasis on trapping for trade. The Deer Lake area remained inaccessible to white traders, however; only the men who brought fur to the distant posts had any contact with Europeans.

By the 19th century, overtrapping and changes in the economics of the fur trade had devastating effects on the people of the area. With the boreal forests largely depleted of fur-bearing animals, the Hudson's Bay Company closed their posts and game remained scarce. Starvation and disease were all too common during this time. When the HBC returned toward the end of the 19th century, they assigned family names to each of the clans. The Pelican clan became the Meekis family after their patriarch Meekis (Shell). The Sucker clan became the Fiddlers (and later the Quills). Many members of the Caribou and Sturgeon clans were given the surname Rae, while other Sturgeons were designated Mamakeesic after their patriarch. The Cranes were either Kakegamic or Kakepetum after their leaders, two brothers known by those names. At this time, these names were only used in trading, but they would later become official with census records and are now the most common surnames found in Deer Lake.

By 1900, the people of the area were among the last Indigenous peoples in North America living with virtually no colonial influences. Christianity, which by that time had come to most Anisininew communities, and Canadian law had almost no influence in the communities. Under Jack Fiddler a powerful ogema (chief and shaman) of the Sucker doodem, the people survived in the traditional way. This, however, began to change.

The arrival of North-West Mounted Police officers in 1906 to arrest Fiddler and his brother Joseph marked the first time most Deer Lakers had ever seen a white person. The elderly Fiddler brothers were charged with murder for killing a windigo (an evil cannibalistic spirit that possesses a person during times of famine) and taken away.

== History in the reserve era ==
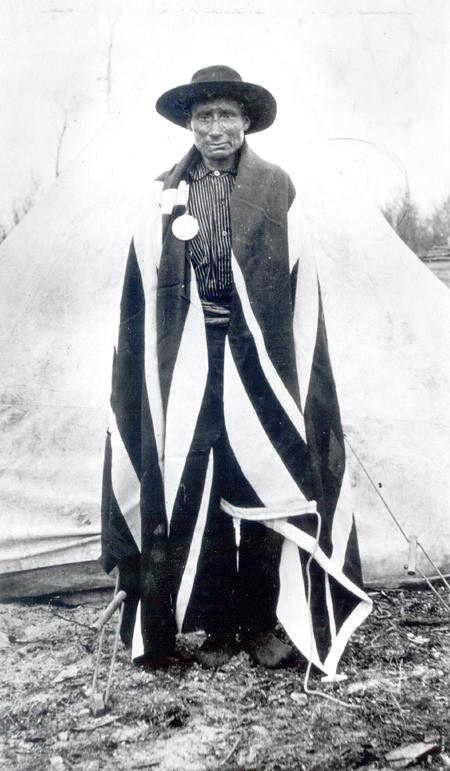
Robert Fiddler, chief of Deer and Sandy Lake Bands at time of treaties.

In 1910, Robert Fiddler, the son of Jack, signed Treaty 5 at the east end of Deer Lake, and the Deer Lake First Nation began its formal relationship with the Government of Canada and the British Crown. The Fiddlers and many others soon left for better farming lands at Sandy Lake and others still went to settle at North Spirit Lake. The only members of the "Deer Lake Band" still living at Deer Lake were the Meekis, Rae, and Quill families. The population of the entire band at all three locations at this time was 78 individuals. However, this number grew with an influx of newcomers from Island Lake in Manitoba and numbered over 300 in 1929. It was that year that commissioners representing the Government of Ontario (the province of Ontario had absorbed the area from the District of Keewatin in 1912), determined that the Sandy Lake settlement was actually in the territories covered in the adhesions to the James Bay Treaty (Treaty 9), and created a reserve for the Deer Lake Band at Sandy Lake Narrows ignoring the fact that a significant portion of the band still resided at Deer Lake and had yet to have a reserve formally designated under the terms of the 1910 treaty.

As the 20th century progressed, the people of Deer Lake increased their contact with the outside. Cree missionaries brought Methodism and Anglicanism, and local people led by Adam Fiddler built and maintained churches. As Jack Fiddler foretold in a vision, airplanes came and took children away to residential schools. An HBC post with a store and post office was established, and Canadians Oscar and Jeanette Lindokken established a nursing station. In this period, the people of Deer Lake were largely denied their sovereign rights and became a colonized people. In some ways, traditional structures and cultural practices broke down, while in other ways they were maintained or modified.

In 1985, the Deer Lake First Nation formally split from the Sandy Lake First Nation; both nations achieved full band status. The two reserves maintain close relations, however, given the shared history and amount of family connections.

== Government ==
=== Governance ===
The leadership of their customary electoral system of government consists of Chief Roy Dale Meekis, Deputy Chief Corey J Meekis and six Councillors: David Meekis, Leonard Mamakeesick, Albert Mamakeesic, Carolyn Meekis, Saulas Meekis and Gary Meekis. Their two-year terms for Deer Lake began on July 15, 2015.

In 1985, the First Nation gained full band status and has worked to take control over its own services. Today the band operates most of its community services or shares them through the Keewaytinook Okimakanak Council or the Nishnawbe Aski Nation.

=== Services ===
- Band Administration
- Economic Development
- Deer Lake Health
- Public Works
  - Airport Security
  - Garage
  - Housing
  - Mini-Hydroelectric Power-generation
  - Water/Sewage
- Deer Lake School
- Tikinagan (Childcare)
- Welfare

== Transportation ==
The community is served by Deer Lake Airport.

== Media ==
- CH4113 TV, Channel 12 - a rebroadcast station for CBLT-DT
- CIDE-4 FM, 91.9 - a rebroadcast station for CIDE-FM
- CKDL FM, 90.1 - Wawatay Radio Network
