= Keewaytinook Okimakanak Council =

Non-political Chiefs Council in Ontario, Canada

Coordinates: 55.990°N 87.632°W

Location of Keewaytinook Okimakanak Council in Ontario

Keewaytinook Okimakanak Council (Oji-Cree:ᑮᐌᑎᓅᐠ ᐅᑭᒫᐦᑳᓇᐠ (Giiwedinoog Ogimaakaanag), unpointed ᑭᐌᑎᓄᐠ ᐅᑭᒪᑲᓇᐠ, which means "Northern Chiefs") is a non-political Chiefs Council in northwestern Ontario, Canada, serving its six member-First Nations. The council was organized in November 1991 (34 years ago).

The organization is directed by the Chiefs of the member First Nations who form the Board of Directors. Like many of the regional tribal councils in northwestern Ontario, Keewaytinook Okimakanak is a member of the Nishnawbe Aski Nation.

== Departments ==
- Administration
- Office Support
- Finance - provides assistance and advice to the First Nations as well as accounting support for Keewaytinook Okimakanak.
- Health Services - support community efforts to access funding for local health promotion initiatives.
- Telemedicine (ᐦᑌᓫᐊ ᒪᐡᑭᐦᑭ, Tela-mashkiki; Unpointed: ᑌᓫᐊ ᒪᐡᑭᑭ)
- Public Works
  - Technical Training & Development
  - Community & Capital Planning
  - Policy & Housing Inspection
  - Operation & Maintenance
  - Project Management
  - Capital Projects
- Economic Development - provide assistance to First Nations and individual band members from Keewaytinook Okimakanak in areas of business, training and proposal development to enhance self-sufficiency.
- Keewaytinook Okimakanak Education - provides advisory services and assistance to member First Nations in a variety of ways.
  - Keewaytinook Internet High School (KiHS) was created for Aboriginal youth who live in small isolated First Nation communities in Northwestern Ontario. KiHS is the first Ontario school to offer accredited secondary school courses using the Internet as a mode of program delivery. With its traditional face-to-face classroom setting meshed with internet course delivery, KiHS capitalizes on the ability to share resources and personnel, and thereby maximize potential course offerings.
- K-Net Services - develop and maintain the K-Net Network which is a regional broadband network linking First Nations and their service organizations using a variety of Information Communication Technologies including video conferencing, IP telephony, on-line forums, e-mail, and other web-based communication tools.
- Kuh-ke-nah Network of SMART First Nations (http://smart.knet.ca) - three-year initiative begun by Keewaytinook Okimakanak and their partners in 2001. KO was one of twelve projects chosen in Canada by Industry Canada to demonstrate community development in an Aboriginal context utilizing a variety of Information Communication Technologies (ICTs) and applications. Other partners include FedNor, SLAAMB, HRDC, the Northern Ontario Heritage Fund, Bell Canada and NAN First Nations and Tribal Councils.
  - SMART services are being deployed to overcome barriers of distance and isolation, to improve community well-being, enhance learning opportunities, and support skills and knowledge acquisition.
- Keewaytinook Okimakanak Research Institute
- Legal Aid

== Member First Nations ==
- Deer Lake First Nation
- Fort Severn First Nation
- Keewaywin First Nation
- McDowell Lake First Nation
- North Spirit Lake First Nation
- Poplar Hill First Nation
