= Mishkeegogamang First Nation =

Mishkeegogamang Ojibway Nation
- First Nation
- Mishkeegogamang First Nation
- Location within Ontario Location within Canada
- Coordinates: 51°14′06″N 090°14′20″W
- Country: Canada
- Province: Ontario
- Provincial Territorial Organization: Nishnawbe Aski Nation
- District: Kenora

Government
  - Chief: Merle Loon
  - MP: Eric Melillo (Kenora—Kiiwetinoong)
  - MPP: Sol Mamakwa (Kiiwetinoong)

Area
  - Total: 18,696.4 ha (46,200 acres)

Population
  - Total: 2,100+ Registered Band Members
- Postal Code: P0V 2H0
- Area code: 807
- Website: www.mishkeegogamang.ca

Mishkeegogamang First Nation is an Ojibway band government (First Nation) in the Canadian province of Ontario. Until 1993, the band was called the Osnaburgh First Nation, with various settlements at times being called New Osnaburgh, Osnaburgh House, or Osnaburgh ("Oz" for short).

The traditional territory of the Mishkeegogamang Ojibway extends to the north, south, east and west, beyond the boundaries of Reserves 63A and 63B. The traditional territory is made up of the communities of the Main Reserve, Bottle Hill, Poplar Heights, Sandy Road, Doghole Bay, Rat Rapids, Cedar Rapids, Ten Houses, Eric Lake, Ace Lake, Metcalfe, Pashkokogan, Mile 50, Fitchie Lake, Mile 42, Mile 29, Menako Lakes, and the shores of Lake St. Joseph.

Mother Tongues: Ojibwe Anishinaabemowin, ᐊᓂᔑᓈᐯᒧᐎᓐ

It is located along Highway 599 in the Kenora District, approximately 20 km (12 mi) south of Pickle Lake. Its total registered population as of March 2022 is 2,028 (of which the on-reserve population was over 1,000 people as of the 2016 Census). At one time a member of the Windigo First Nations Council, Mishkeegogamang First Nation is not part of any regional tribal councils as of February 2015; however, they have retained their membership with the Nishnawbe Aski Nation.

== Geography ==
- The Mishkeegogamang First Nation's landbase consists of two reserves, the smaller 5,018.6-hectare (12,401-acre) Osnaburgh Indian Reserve 63A and the larger 13,677.8-hectare (33,799-acre) Osnaburgh Indian Reserve 63B.
- The First Nation land is located within two districts, the smaller Osnaburgh 63A is located in the boundary of the Thunder Bay District, while the larger Osnaburgh 63B is located in the boundary of the Kenora District. Mishkeegogamang does not observe daylight saving time.
- Oz is made up of separate and somewhat geographically disconnected communities. On their main reserve are the communities of Bottle Hill, Poplar Heights and Sandy Road. A community about 24 km (15 mi) south called Ten Houses is also associated with this First Nation. Additionally, some small communities called Doghole Bay, Eric Lake, Ace Lake and a few others are also associated with Osnaburgh.

== Infrastructure ==
=== Transportation ===
- Mishkeegogamang First Nation has year-round access by road, It is located along Highway 599 in the Kenora District, approximately 20 km (12 mi) south of Pickle Lake.
- The community is also served by nearby Pickle Lake Airport for passenger and cargo services to all flying destinations.

=== Medical centres and nearby hospitals ===
- MIshkeegogamang Health Centre is located along Highway 599 on the Main Reserve community, one of the many sub-division communities of the First Nation. It serves as the Nursing Station and administration office for health programs, coordinates health care services through Nursing staff, Community Health Representatives, visiting community Physicians and Doctors.
- Participates in Thunder Bay's Regional Critical Care Response Program (RCCR) with other First Nation communities which enables patients to be triaged and cared for by critical care doctors and other highly-skilled staff at TBRHSC's Intensive Care Unit via videoconferencing equipment prior to transfer via Air Amublance (Ornge)
- Major hospitals nearby Mishkeegogamang include Sioux Lookout Meno Ya Win Health Centre, Thunder Bay Regional Health Sciences Centre, Health Sciences Centre and The Children's Hospital of Winnipeg.

=== Utilities ===
- Water, sewage services, garbage, street plowing and snow removal are provided by Mishkeegogamang First Nation. It also contracts out several services to private companies off-reserve for other work needed, such as electrical, plumbing and propane services for the residents of the First Nation
- Mishkeegogamang First Nation is connected to the provincial grid through the Wataynikaneyap Power transmission line via Pickle Lake Substation.
- The primary telecommunications carrier is Bell Canada which provides telephone, cellular, television and internet services to the First Nation. Although residents can subscribe other corporations such as Starlink, Shaw, Xplornet, Virgin Mobile, Neighbourhood Connection, Kuhkenah Network (KNET), Koodo Mobility and many more.

== Current Governance ==
=== Chief and Council (2023-2025) ===
Title	Given Name	Surname	Appointment Date	Expiry Date
Chief	MERLE	LOON	08/10/2023	08/09/2025
Head Councillor	TANYA	BOTTLE	08/10/2023	08/09/2025
Councillor	MAXINE	SKUNK	08/10/2023	08/09/2025
Councillor	BRENDA	FOX	08/10/2023	08/09/2025
Councillor	LINDA	KAMINAWAISH	08/10/2023	08/09/2025
Councillor	MARY ANN	PANACHEESE-SKUNK	08/10/2023	08/09/2025

Membership Authority

Section 11 Band

Election System

Indian Act

Council Quorum

4

=== First Nation Affiliations ===
- Mishkeegogamang First Nation is governed by one Chief and five Band Councillors who are elected every two years.
- Mishkeegogamang is not affiliated with any tribal organization, but is associated with Nishnawbe Aski Nation lobby group.
- Mishkeegogamang is policed by the Nishnawbe-Aski Police Service, an aboriginal-based service. The Mishkeegogamang NAPS detachment can also refer cases to the Pickle Lake detachment of the Ontario Provincial Police, in nearby Pickle Lake.
- Mishkeegogamang First Nation residents vote in the Kenora federal riding and the Kiiwetinoong provincial electoral district. Kiiwetinoong has a population of 32,987 and means "North" in Ojibwe. Kiiwetinoong is 68 percent indigenous.

== Official Address ==
Mishkeegogamang Band Office

3C James Road

Mishkeegogamang, Ontario, Canada

P0V 2H0

== History ==
=== Early history ===
- The Mishkeegogamang people are Ojibway who are believed to have originated in the Great Lakes region. The tribe might have moved north when European Hudson's Bay Company traders started establishing interior posts and routes, or possibly beforehand. Their arrival pushed the previous Cree occupants farther northward.

=== Osnaburgh House ===
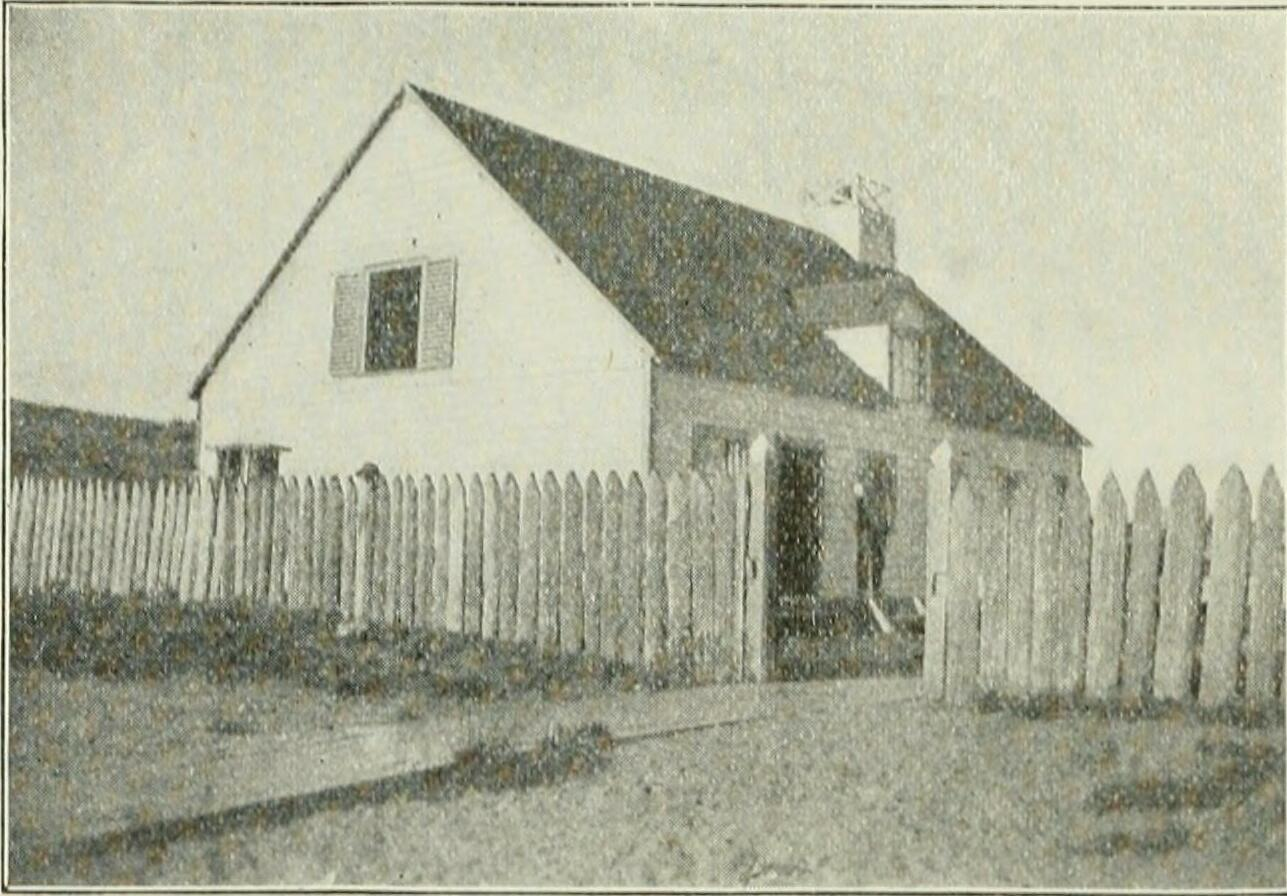
Osnaburg House, HBC post, 1901

- As the Hudson's Bay Company sought to establish interior trading posts to compete with rival companies, it sent John Best along the Albany River to scout locations for such a post. He chose a spot near the northeast end of Lake St. Joseph and called the post Osnaburgh House (51°08′14″N 90°16′00″W). The house itself survived for around 200 years, later giving its name to the settlement of Osnaburgh (51°07′30″N 90°15′14″W), which lay directly across the lake from the house. The house was abandoned in 1963, after which it fell into ruin. Since the 1980s, the site (which is not inside the boundaries of the first nation) has been the Old Post Lodge fishing camp.

=== Twentieth and twenty-first century ===
- In 1905, the Government of Canada sent commissioners to the area to attain the land for the Crown. Treaty 9 between them and the Mishkeegogamang (among other groups) set aside two pieces of land for reserves (Osnaburgh 63A and 63B) with the promise that the people would not necessarily have to live on the reserves and would have full use of all of their traditional lands. The tribe was formalised at this time with Missabay chosen as the first chief and a band and council system was instituted.
- The completion of Highway 599 in 1954 from Savant Lake to an earlier mine road brought great social change to the Mishkeegogamang. The highway was several kilometres from Osnaburgh village (in Osnaburgh 63A), so the government encouraged people to move a new village, New Osnaburgh (51°14′06″N 90°14′20″W), on Doghole Lake (Osnaburgh 63B) which today is the Main Reserve.
- MIshkeegogamang maintains strong ties with Cat Lake First Nation, Slate Falls First Nation and the Ojibway Nation of Saugeen.

=== Elected Chiefs since 1905 ===
Chief	Elected Year	Expiry Year	Other
Daniel Missabay	Prior to 1905		
Osnaburgh Band of Ojibways signed The James Bay Treaty (Treaty No. 9)
Daniel Missabay	1905	1908	Died. 1908
George Wawaashkung	1908	1914	1st time
Keewaykeesicquayosh	1914	1915	1st time
George Wawaashkung	1915	1916	2nd time
Johh Skunk	1916	1923	1st time
Peter Moquano	1923	1926	1st tme
James Ruben	1926	1929	1st time
John Carpenter	1929	1935	1st time
Peter Moquano	1935	1938	2nd time, Resigned
William Semia Oombash	1938	1941	1st time
James Masakeyash	1941	1965	1st time
Levius Wesley	1965	1967	1st time
James Masakeyash	1967	1969	2nd time
Sam Skunk	1969	1971	1st time, Resigned
Robert Lastheels	1971	1975	1st time
Daniel Panacheese	1975	1977	1st time
Maurice Loon	1977	1978	1st time, Resigned
Aloysuis Kaminaiwash	1978	1981	1st time
Roy Kaminaiwash	1981	1983	1st time
Maurice Loon	1983	1985	2nd time
Roy Kaminaiwash	1985	1993	2nd time
"Osnaburgh Band" name changed to "Mishkeegogamang" through Band Council Resolution
Ronald Roundhead	1993	2005	1st time
Connie Gray Mckay	2005	2017	1st time
David Masakeyash	2017	2023	1st time
Merle Loon	2023	*****	1st time
