= Pembina River (Ontario) =

- Location of the mouth of the Pembina River in Ontario

Location
- Country: Canada
- Province: Ontario
- Region: Northwestern Ontario
- District: Kenora

Physical characteristics
- Source: Pembina Lake
  - coordinates: 51°06′27″N 90°59′37″W
  - elevation: 388 m (1,273 ft)
- Mouth: Lake St. Joseph
  - coordinates: 51°06′17″N 90°47′43″W
  - elevation: 374 m (1,227 ft)

Basin features
- River system: James Bay drainage basin

The Pembina River is a river in the Unorganized Part of Kenora District in Northwestern Ontario, Canada. The river is part of the James Bay drainage basin, and flows from Pembina Lake to Pembina Bay on the north shore of Lake St. Joseph. The latter lake is the source of the Albany River, which flows to James Bay.

== Sources ==
- Map 16 (PDF) (Map). 1 : 1,600,000. Official road map of Ontario. Ministry of Transportation of Ontario. 2014.
- Restructured municipalities - Ontario map #1 (Map). Restructuring Maps of Ontario. Ontario Ministry of Municipal Affairs and Housing. 2006. Archived from the original on 2012-05-05.
