= Wendigo =

Mythical being in Native American folklore

Creature information
- Grouping: Legendary creature
- Sub grouping: Algonquian

Origin
- Region: Canada; United States

Wendigo (/ˈwɛndɪɡoʊ/) is a mythological creature or evil spirit originating from Algonquian folklore. The concept of the wendigo has been widely used in literature and other works of art, such as social commentary and horror fiction.

The wendigo is often said to be a malevolent spirit, sometimes depicted as a creature with human-like characteristics, who may possess human beings. It is said to cause in its victims a feeling of insatiable hunger, the desire to eat other humans, and the propensity to commit murder. In some representations, the wendigo is described as a giant humanoid with a heart of ice, whose approach is signalled by a foul stench or sudden unseasonable chill.

In modern psychiatry, the disorder known as "Wendigo psychosis" is characterized by symptoms such as an intense craving for human flesh and fear of becoming a cannibal. Wendigo psychosis is described as a culture-bound syndrome. In some First Nations communities, symptoms such as insatiable greed and destruction of the environment are also thought to be symptoms of wendigo psychosis.

The wechuge is a similar being that appears in the legends of the Athabaskan people of the Northwest Pacific Coast. It too is cannibalistic; however, it is characterized as enlightened with ancestral insights.

== Etymology ==
The contemporary English word wendigo is a loanword from multiple origins. It is partially a borrowing from Cree (wīhtikōw) and partially a borrowing from Ojibwe (wiindigoo), both Algonquian languages. Comparable forms are in English since 1714 (Whitego). The form wendigo was popularized in the English language by Algernon Blackwood, who in 1910 published the novella The Wendigo.

The word has been reconstructed in Proto-Algonquian as *wi·nteko·wa, with the potential meaning owl.

== Folklore ==
The wendigo is part of the traditional belief system of several Algonquian-speaking peoples, including the Ojibwe, the Saulteaux, the Cree, the Naskapi, and the Innu. Although descriptions can vary somewhat, common to all these cultures is the view that the wendigo is a malevolent, cannibalistic, supernatural being. They were strongly associated with the north, winter, cold, famine, and starvation.

Basil H. Johnston, an Ojibwe teacher and scholar from Ontario, described a wendigo:

The Wendigo was gaunt to the point of emaciation, its desiccated skin pulled tightly over its bones. With its bones pushing out against its skin, its complexion the ash-gray of death, and its eyes pushed back deep into their sockets, the Wendigo looked like a gaunt skeleton recently disinterred from the grave. What lips it had were tattered and bloody ... Unclean and suffering from suppuration of the flesh, the Wendigo gave off a strange and eerie odor of decay and decomposition, of death and corruption.

In Ojibwe, Eastern Cree, Westmain Swampy Cree, Naskapi, and Innu lore, wendigos are often described as giants that are many times larger than human beings, a characteristic absent from myths in other Algonquian cultures. Whenever a wendigo ate another person, it would grow in proportion to the meal it had just eaten, so it could never be full. Therefore, wendigos are portrayed as simultaneously gluttonous and extremely thin due to starvation.

The wendigo is seen as the embodiment of gluttony, greed, and excess. Never satisfied after killing and consuming one person, they are constantly searching for new victims.

A wendigo need not lose the human's powers of cognition or speech and in some depictions may clearly communicate with its prospective victims or even threaten or taunt them. A specimen of folk story collected in the early 20th century by Lottie Chicogquaw Marsden, an ethnographer of the Chippewas of Rama First Nation, in which a wendigo also exhibits tool use, an ability to survive partial dismemberment, and autocannibalism, reads:

One time long ago a big Windigo stole an Indian boy, but the boy was too thin, so the Windigo didn't eat him up right away, but he travelled with the Indian boy waiting for him till he'd get fat. The Windigo had a knife and he'd cut the boy on the hand to see if he was fat enough to eat, but the boy didn't get fat. They travelled too much. One day they came to an Indian village and the Windigo sent the boy to the Indian village to get some things for him to eat. He just gave the boy so much time to go there and back. The boy told the Indians that the Windigo was near them, and showed them his hand where the Windigo cut him to see if he was fat enough to eat. They heard the Windigo calling the boy. He said to the boy "Hurry up. Don't tell lies to those Indians." All of these Indians went to where the Windigo was and cut off his legs. They went back again to see if he was dead. He wasn't dead. He was eating the juice (marrow) from the inside of the bones of his legs that were cut off. The Indians asked the Windigo if there was any fat on them. He said, "You bet there is, I have eaten lots of Indians, no wonder they are fat." The Indians then killed him and cut him to pieces. This was the end of this Giant Windigo.

=== Human cannibalism ===
In some traditions, humans overpowered by greed could turn into wendigos; the myth thus served as a method of encouraging cooperation and moderation. Other sources say wendigos were created when a human resorted to cannibalism to survive. Humans could also turn into wendigos by being in contact with them for too long.

=== Taboo reinforcement ceremony ===
Among the Assiniboine, the Cree, and the Ojibwe, a satirical ceremonial dance is sometimes performed during times of famine to reinforce the seriousness of the wendigo taboo. The ceremony, known as wiindigookaanzhimowin, was performed during times of famine, and involved wearing masks and dancing backward around a drum. The last known wendigo ceremony conducted in the United States was at Lake Windigo of Star Island of Cass Lake, within the Leech Lake Indian Reservation in northern Minnesota.

== Psychosis ==
In historical accounts of retroactively diagnosed wendigo psychosis, it has been reported that humans became possessed by the wendigo spirit, after being in a situation of needing food and having no other choice besides cannibalism. In 1661, The Jesuit Relations reported:

Ce qui nous mit plus en peine, fut la nouvelle que nous apprismes dés l'entrée du Lac, à sçauoir : que les deputez par nostre Conducteur, qui deuoient conuoquer les Nations à la Mer du Nord, et leur donner le rendez-vous pour nous y attendre, auoient esté tuez l'Hiuer passé, d'une façon estonnante. Ces pauures gens furent saisis, à ce qu'on nous a dit, d'vn mal qui nous est inconnu, mais qui n'est pas bien extraordinaire parmy les peuples que nous cherchons : ils ne sont ny lunatiques, ny hypocondriaques, ny phrenetiques; mais ils ont vn mélange de toutes ces sortes de maladies, qui, leur blessant l'imagination, leur cause vne faim plus que canine, et les rend si affamez de chair humaine, qu'ils se iettent sur les femmes, sur les enfans, mesme sur les hommes, comme de vrais loups-garous, et les deuorent à belles dents, sans se pouuoir rassasier ny saouler, cherchans tousiours nouuelle proye, et plus auidement que plus ils en ont mangé. C'est la maladie dont ces députez furent atteints; et comme la mort est l'vnique remede parmy ces bonnes gens, pour arrester ces meurtres, ils ont esté massacrez pour arrester le cours de leur manie.

Translation:

What caused us greater concern was the news that met us upon entering the Lake, namely, that the men deputed by our Conductor for the purpose of summoning the Nations to the North Sea, and assigning them a rendezvous, where they were to await our coming, had met their death the previous Winter in a very strange manner. Those poor men (according to the report given us) were seized with an ailment unknown to us, but not very unusual among the people we were seeking. They are afflicted with neither lunacy, hypochondria, nor frenzy; but have a combination of all these species of disease, which affects their imaginations and causes them a more than canine hunger. This makes them so ravenous for human flesh that they pounce upon women, children, and even upon men, like veritable werewolves, and devour them voraciously, without being able to appease or glut their appetite—ever seeking fresh prey, and the more greedily the more they eat. This ailment attacked our deputies; and, as death is the sole remedy among those simple people for checking such acts of murder, they were slain in order to stay the course of their madness.

Although in many recorded cases of wendigo psychosis the individual has been killed to prevent cannibalism from resulting, some Cree folklore recommends treatment by ingestion of fatty animal meats or drinking animal grease; those treated may sometimes vomit ice as part of the curing process.

One of the more famous cases of wendigo psychosis reported involved a Plains Cree trapper from Alberta, named Swift Runner. During the winter of 1878, Swift Runner and his family were starving, and his eldest son died. Twenty-five miles away from emergency food supplies at a Hudson's Bay Company post, Swift Runner butchered and ate his wife and five remaining children. Given that he resorted to cannibalism so near to food supplies, and that he killed and consumed the remains of all those present, it was revealed that Swift Runner's was not a case of pure cannibalism as a last resort to avoid starvation, but rather of a man with wendigo psychosis. He eventually confessed and was executed by authorities at Fort Saskatchewan.

Another well-known case involving wendigo psychosis is that of Jack Fiddler, an Oji-Cree chief and medicine man known for his powers at defeating wendigos. In some cases, this entailed killing people with wendigo psychosis. As a result, in 1907, Fiddler and his brother Joseph were arrested by the Canadian authorities for homicide. Jack committed suicide, but Joseph was tried and sentenced to life in prison. He ultimately was granted a pardon but died three days later in jail before receiving the news of this pardon.

Fascination with wendigo psychosis among Western ethnographers, psychologists, and anthropologists led to a hotly debated controversy in the 1980s over the historicity of this phenomenon. Some researchers argued that, essentially, Wendigo psychosis was a fabrication, the result of naïve anthropologists taking stories related to them at face value without observation. Others cited several credible eyewitness accounts by Algonquians and others, as evidence that wendigo psychosis was a factual historical phenomenon.

The frequency of wendigo psychosis cases decreased sharply in the 20th century as Boreal Algonquian people came into greater and greater contact with European ideologies and more sedentary, less rural, lifestyles.

In his 2004 treatise Revenge of the Windigo on disorders and treatments of the behavioral health industry in the United States and Canada that are peculiar to indigenous people, James B. Waldram wrote,

...no actual cases of windigo psychosis have ever been studied, and Lou Marano's scathing critique in 1985 should have killed off the cannibal monster within the psychiatric annals. The windigo, however, continues to seek revenge for this attempted scholarly execution by periodically duping unsuspecting passers-by, like psychiatrists, into believing that windigo psychosis not only exists but that a psychiatrist could conceivably encounter a patient suffering from this disorder in his or her practice today! Windigo psychosis may well be the most perfect example of the construction of an Aboriginal mental disorder by the scholarly professions, and its persistence dramatically underscores how constructions of the Aboriginal by these professions have, like Frankenstein's monster, taken on a life of their own.

The 10th revision of the International Statistical Classification of Diseases and Related Health Problems (ICD) classifies "Windigo" as a culture-specific disorder, describing it as "Rare, historic accounts of cannibalistic obsession... Symptoms included depression, homicidal or suicidal thoughts, and a delusional, compulsive wish to eat human flesh... Some controversial new studies question the syndrome's legitimacy, claiming cases were actually a product of hostile accusations invented to justify the victim's ostracism or execution."

== As a concept or metaphor ==
In addition to denoting a cannibalistic monster from certain traditional folklore, some Native Americans also understand the wendigo conceptually. As a concept, the wendigo can apply to any person, idea, or movement infected by a corrosive drive toward self-aggrandizing greed and excessive consumption, traits that sow disharmony and destruction if left unchecked. Ojibwe scholar Brady DeSanti asserts that the wendigo "can be understood as a marker indicating... a person... imbalanced both internally and toward the larger community of human and spiritual beings around them." Out of equilibrium and estranged by their communities, individuals thought to be afflicted by the wendigo spirit unravel and destroy the ecological balance around them. Chippewa author Louise Erdrich's novel The Round House, winner of the National Book Award, depicts a situation where an individual person becomes a wendigo. The novel describes its primary antagonist, a rapist whose violent crimes desecrate a sacred site, as a wendigo who must be killed because he threatens the reservation's safety.

In addition to characterizing individual people who exhibit destructive tendencies, the wendigo can also describe movements and events with similarly negative effects. According to Professor Chris Schedler, the figure of the wendigo represents "consuming forms of exclusion and assimilation" through which groups dominate other groups." This application allows Native Americans to describe colonialism and its agents as wendigos since the process of colonialism ejected natives from their land and threw the natural world out of balance. DeSanti points to the 1999 horror film Ravenous as an illustration of this argument equating "the cannibal monster" to "American colonialism and manifest destiny". This movie features a character who articulates that expansion brings displacement and destruction as side effects, explaining that "manifest destiny" and "western expansion" will bring "thousands of gold-hungry Americans... over the mountains in search of new lives... This country is seeking to be whole... Stretching out its arms... and consuming all it can. And we merely follow".

As a concept, wendigo can apply to situations other than some Native American-European relations. It can serve as a metaphor explaining any pattern of domination by which groups subjugate and dominate or violently destroy and displace. Joe Lockhard, English professor at Arizona State University, argues that wendigos are agents of "social cannibalism" who know "no provincial or national borders; all human cultures have been visited by shape-shifting wendigos. Their visitations speak to the inseparability of human experience... National identity is irrelevant to this borderless horror." Lockhard's ideas explain that wendigos are an expression of a dark aspect of human nature: the drive toward greed, consumption, and disregard for other life in the pursuit of self-aggrandizement.

Romantic scholar and documentarian Emily Zarka, also a professor at Arizona State University, observes that two commonalities among the indigenous cultures of Algonquian language family speakers are that they are situated in climes where harsh winters are frequent and may be accompanied by starvation. She states that the wendigo symbolically represents three major concepts: it is the incarnation of winter, the embodiment of hunger, and the personification of selfishness.

== In popular culture ==
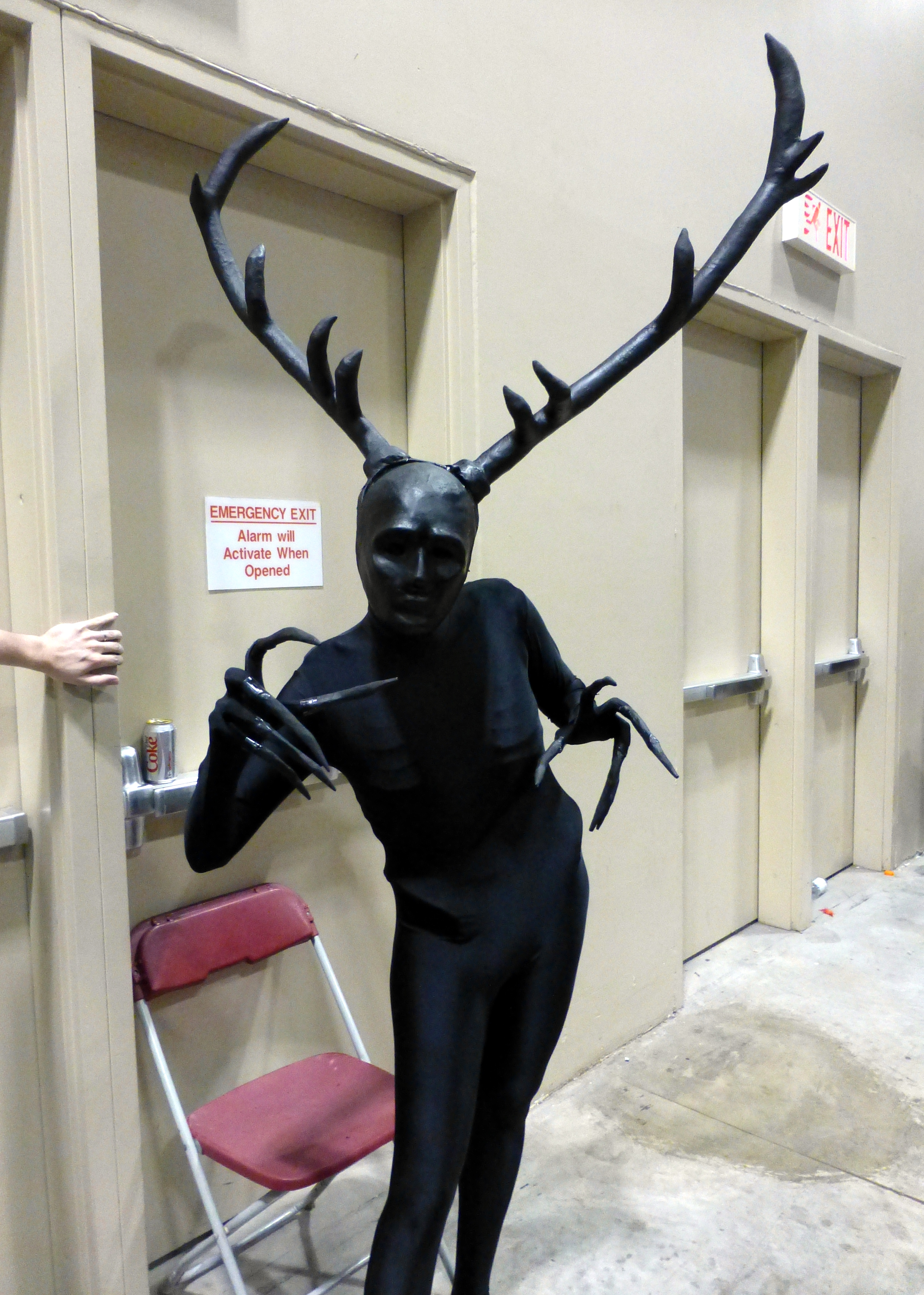
A person dressed as the wendigo character from the television series Hannibal at Fan Expo 2015

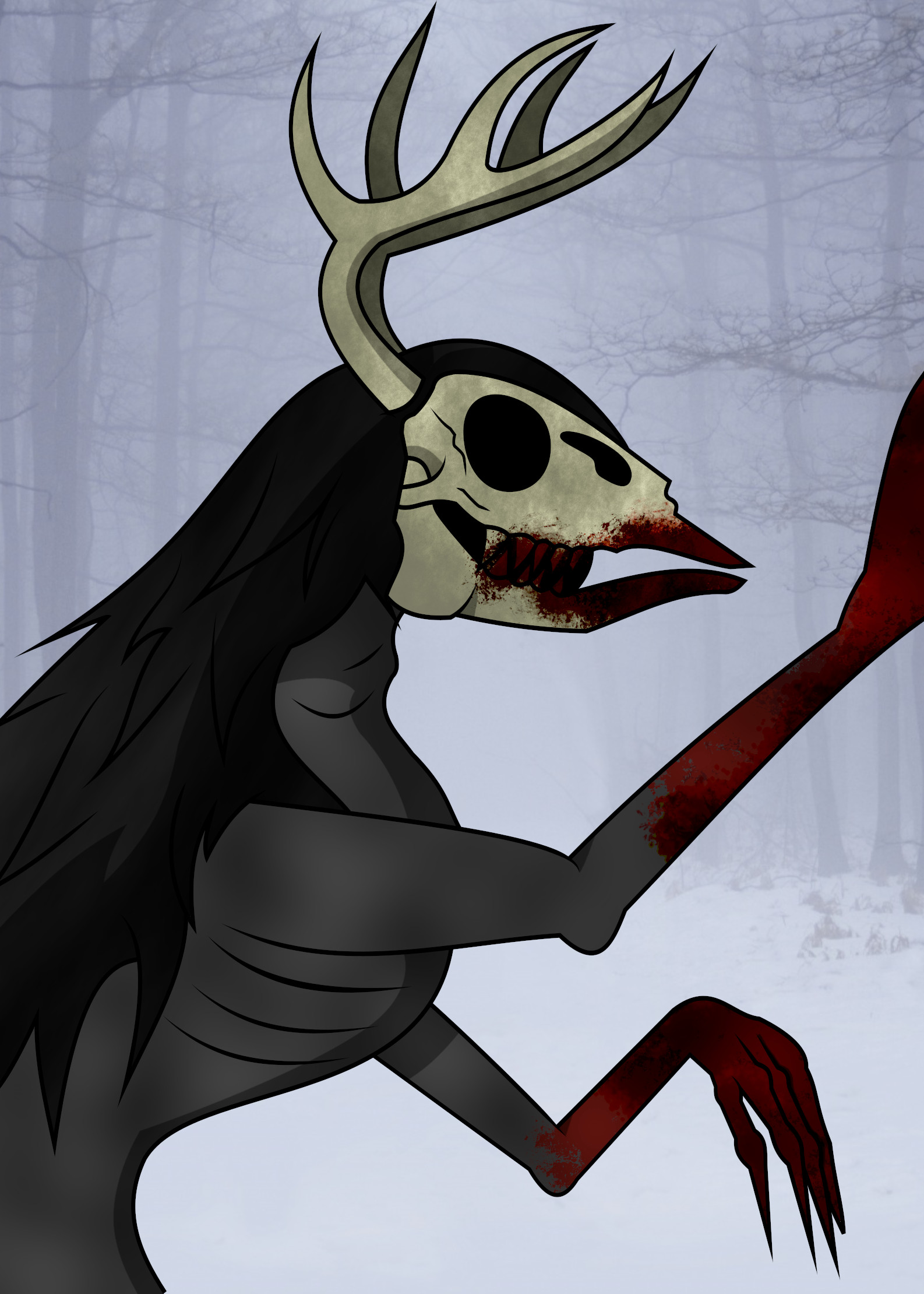
An artist's rendition of a wendigo as frequently depicted in contemporary pop culture.

Although distinct from how it appears in the traditional lore, one of the first appearances of a character inspired by, or named after, a wendigo in non-Indigenous literature is Algernon Blackwood's 1910 novella The Wendigo. Joe Nazare wrote that Blackwood's "subtly-demonizing rhetoric transforms the Wendigo from a native myth into a descriptive template for the Indian savage."

Blackwood's work has influenced many of the subsequent portrayals in mainstream horror fiction, such as August Derleth's "The Thing that Walked on the Wind" and "Ithaqua" (1933 and 1941), which in turn inspired the character in Stephen King's novel Pet Sematary, where it is a personification of evil, an ugly grinning creature with yellow-grey eyes, ears replaced by ram's horns, white vapor coming from its nostrils, and a pointed, decaying yellow tongue. These works set the template for later portrayals in popular culture, at times even replacing the Native American lore. In an early short story by Thomas Pynchon, "Mortality and Mercy in Vienna" (first published in 1959), the plot centers around a character developing Wendigo syndrome and going on a killing spree.

In 1973 a character inspired by the Wendigo appeared in American comic books published by Marvel Comics. Created by the writer Steve Englehart and artist Herb Trimpe, the monster is the result of a curse that afflicts those who commit acts of cannibalism. The Marvel Comics version does not resemble a traditional wendigo as portrayed by popular culture, but rather a silver-haired Bigfoot-like being with a prehensile tail. It first appeared in The Incredible Hulk #162 (April 1973), and again in the October 1974 issue.

Contemporary Indigenous works that explore the legend include the 1995 novel Solar Storms, by author and poet Linda K. Hogan (Chickasaw), which explores the stories of the wendigo and incorporates the creatures as a device to interrogate issues of independence, spirituality, politics, an individual's relationship to the family, and as a metaphor for corporate voracity, exploitation, and power - all viewed as a form of cannibalism. Wrist, the 2016 debut novel by First Nations horror fiction writer Nathan Niigan Noodin Adler (Lac Des Milles Lacs Anishinaabe), combines the traditional Ojibwe legend with the author's ideas inspired by non-Indigenous writers like Anne Rice and Tim Powers.

Other creatures based on the legend, or named for it, appear in various films and television shows, including Ravenous (1999), Dark Was the Night (2014), Hannibal (2013–2015), and the 2021 film Antlers by Scott Cooper, where the wendigo is portrayed as a deer-like creature with a glowing heart that moves from person to person with a never ending hunger. Guillermo del Toro, producer of the film, developed the wendigo on the basis that the more the creature eats, the more it gets hungry and the more it gets hungry, the weaker it becomes. In the 2021 film The Inhuman (L'Inhumain) the arrival of a wendigo symbolizes inner turmoil after a character turns his back on his Indigenous heritage in the pursuit of material success.

Various characters inspired by the legend, or named for it, appear in role-playing video games. The interactive horror video game Until Dawn (2015) features multiple Wendigos as central antagonists, as the game is set primarily in a former Native American territory. In 2018's Fallout 76 by Bethesda Game Studios, wendigos are featured as one of the cryptid enemies in the area of Appalachia, mutated from people who consumed human flesh in isolation. In the 2018 first-person shooter video game Dusk, wendigos are enemies that remain invisible until they receive damage. Several of these creatures also appear in the game's cover art.

Francesca Amee Johnson criticized the use of the Wendigo as an antagonist horror character in popular culture in Reinvention: an International Journal of Undergraduate Research. She noted that many popular depictions, like Until Dawn (2015), The Retreat (2020), and Supernatural (2005–2020) are created by mostly non-native writers. The use of the Wendigo as an antagonist has become a common trope, "as it easily creates a villain for white protagonists to defeat repeatedly." Johnson writes,

This construction is problematic in the horror genre as it presents an Indigenous antagonist that poses a threat to white culture for its otherness and indigeneity – while at the same time, misappropriating, discarding and demonising the Indigenous culture the myth comes from, at whim.

== See also ==
- Mistapew
- Skin-walker
