= Albany River Delta =

River delta in Ontario, Canada

Albany River delta
- Location within Ontario
- Location: Ontario, Canada
- Coordinates: 52.24°N 81.68°W

The Albany River delta is a river delta at the mouth of the Albany River on the southern coast of James Bay in northern Ontario, Canada. The delta contains numerous islands, channels, wetlands, and coastal marshes.

== Islands ==
The Albany River delta contains numerous islands formed by the deposition of sediments that are carried by water from the river. Notable islands in the delta include:

- Albany Island
- Linklater Island
- Kakago Island
- Clark Island
- Big Island
- Fafard Island
- Faries Island
- Other smaller and unnamed islands in the region

== Environment ==
The islands in the river delta consist primarily of coastal wetlands. The area is low-lying and influenced by seasonal flooding. It forms part of an Important Bird Area

== Nearby communities ==
- Fort Albany and Kashechewan are Cree First Nations located near the delta in Northern Ontario.

== See also ==
- Albany River
- James Bay
- Hudson Bay
- Hudson Bay Lowlands
