= Casummit Lake, Ontario =

Casummit Lake
- Location in Ontario
- Coordinates: 51°28′58″N 92°21′22″W
- Country: Canada
- Province: Ontario
- District: Kenora
- Elevation: 392 m (1,286 ft)
- Time zone: UTC-6 (Central Time Zone)
  - Summer (DST): UTC-5 (Central Time Zone)

Casummit Lake is a settlement in the Unorganized Part of Kenora District, Ontario, Canada, about 110 kilometres (68 mi) northeast of the community of Red Lake. It is on the northeast shore of Casummit Lake.
