= Cheepay River =

- Location of the river mouth in Ontario

Location
- Country: Canada
- Province: Ontario
- Region: Northeastern Ontario
- District: Cochrane

Physical characteristics
- Source
  - coordinates: 50°38′25″N 84°00′23″W
  - elevation: 123 m (404 ft)
- Mouth: Albany River
  - coordinates: 51°28′45″N 83°24′29″W
  - elevation: 56 m (184 ft)

Basin features
- River system: James Bay drainage basin

The Cheepay River is a river that is situated in the northeastern Kenora District in northeastern Ontario, Canada. It is located in the James Bay drainage basin and is a right tributary of the Albany River.

The Cheepay River begins in muskeg and flows northeast then north to its mouth at the Albany River, which flows to James Bay.

The unincorporated place of Ghost River and Cheepay Island, the latter officially in Kenora District, are at the river mouth.

== Sources ==
- Map 18 (PDF) (Map). 1 : 1,600,000. Official road map of Ontario. Ministry of Transportation of Ontario. 2014.
