= Osnaburgh 63B =

- Indian reserve
- Osnaburgh Indian Reserve No. 63B
- Location within Ontario
- Coordinates: 51°14′N 90°11′W
- Country: Canada
- Province: Ontario
- District: Kenora
- First Nation: Mishkeegogamang

Area
  - Land: 121.02 km^{2} (46.73 sq mi)

Population (2011)
  - Total: 425
  - Density: 3.5/km^{2} (9.1/sq mi)
- Website: www.mishkeegogamang.ca

Osnaburgh 63B is a First Nations reserve in Kenora District, Ontario. It is one of the reserves of the Mishkeegogamang First Nation, alongside Osnaburgh 63A.

Osnaburgh 63B is made up of five separate areas known as Dog Hole Bay, Sandy Road, Bottle Hill, Trailer Park, Main Reserve..
