= Pembina River =

Pembina River may refer to:

- Pembina River (Alberta), a river in central Alberta, Canada
- Pembina River (Manitoba – North Dakota), a river in southern Manitoba, Canada and northern North Dakota, United States
- Pembina River (Ontario), a river in northwestern Ontario, Canada
