= The Retreat (2020 film) =

2020 American horror film

- Promotional release poster
- Directed by: Bruce Wemple
- Written by: Bruce Wemple
- Starring: Grant Schumacher; Dylan Grunn; Chris Cimperman
- Music by: Nate VanDeusen
- Production company: 377 Films
- Distributed by: Uncork'd Entertainment
- Release date: November 10, 2020
- Country: United States
- Language: English

The Retreat is a 2020 American horror film written and directed by Bruce Wemple. Set in the Adirondack High Peaks of upstate New York, the film stars Grant Schumacher as Gus, a man who, during a winter backpacking trip with his friend Adam (Dylan Grunn), finds himself tormented by a wendigo.

The Retreat was released on DVD and video-on-demand (VOD) on November 10, 2020.

== Cast ==
- Grant Schumacher as Gus
- Dylan Grunn as Adam
- Chris Cimperman as Ryan
- Rick Montgomery Jr. as Marty
- Peter Stray as Therapist
- Ariella Mastroianni as Amy
- Catharine Daddario as Frieda

== Reception ==
Dakota Dahl of Rue Morgue magazine called the film "a pretty fun psychological thriller/monster movie mashup", and wrote that "While the monster scenes are hit or miss, the film's slippery grip on reality can be fun, especially for anyone who has dabbled in hallucinogens before."
