= Wataynikaneyap Power =

Canadian electric company

Wataynikaneyap Power is a First Nations–led electricity transmission company in northwestern Ontario, Canada. It was established in 2010 to develop and operate a large-scale transmission system connecting remote First Nations to the provincial electricity grid.

The company is majority-owned by a partnership of 24 First Nations (51%), with the remaining ownership held by Fortis Inc. and other private investors. It is regulated by the Ontario Energy Board and is widely regarded as one of the largest Indigenous-led infrastructure projects in Canadian history .

== History ==
The origins of Wataynikaneyap Power date to the late 1990s and 2000s, when many remote First Nations in northwestern Ontario depended on diesel generators for electricity. These systems were costly, unreliable, and limited community development.

In response, regional First Nations leadership began pursuing a long-term plan to connect these communities to the provincial grid. The initiative gained formal support in Ontario’s 2010 Long-Term Energy Plan and subsequent provincial directives, which envisioned extending transmission infrastructure north of Pickle Lake.

Wataynikaneyap Power was incorporated in 2010 to advance this vision, with a mandate to design, construct, own, and operate a transmission line system serving remote communities. Over time, the project evolved into a large partnership involving First Nations, government funding, and private-sector expertise.

== Wataynikaneyap Power Transmission System ==
The company’s central undertaking is the Wataynikaneyap Power transmission system, which is approximately 1,800 kilometres of transmission lines and 22 substations, extending the electricity grid into remote regions. Construction began in phases, with the first community connection (Pikangikum First Nation) completed in December 2018 and full-scale construction underway from 2020.

Construction of the transmission system was substantially completed in 2024, marking the completion of what has been described as the largest Indigenous-led energy project in Ontario’s history.

The transmission system now connected 16 remote First Nations to reliable grid electricity, replacing diesel generation.

== Leadership and governance ==
Wataynikaneyap Power is structured as a partnership between Indigenous and private-sector stakeholders. A group of 24 First Nations collectively holds a controlling 51% ownership stake, while Fortis Inc. and other investors hold the remaining 49%.This ownership model has been described as unprecedented in Canada for infrastructure of this scale, emphasizing Indigenous control and long-term economic participation.

The project also includes community-led engagement and training efforts through affiliated organizations, reflecting a governance structure designed to incorporate Indigenous decision-making and participation.
