= Bone tool =

Tool created from bone

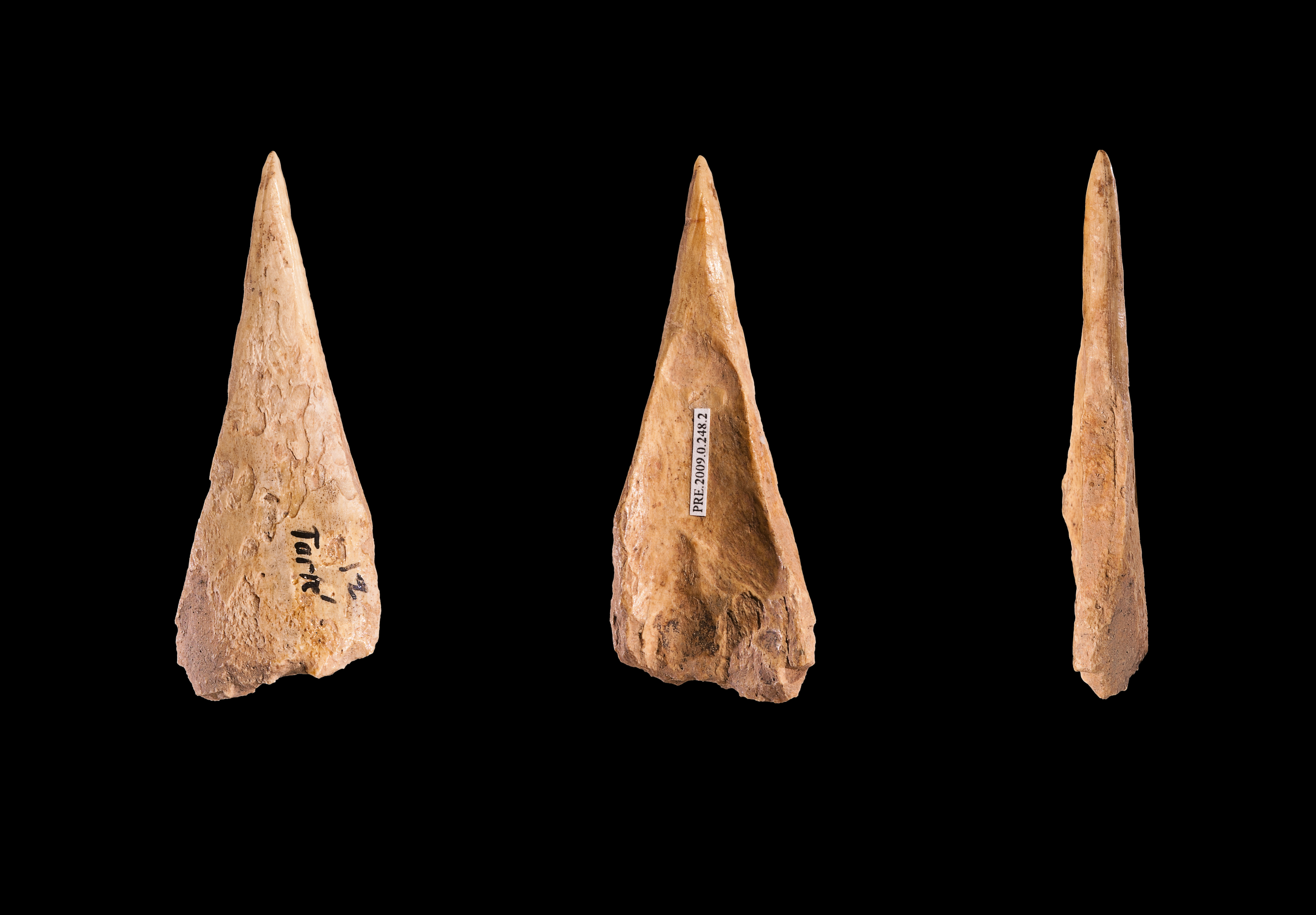
Bone awl

In archaeology, bone tools have been documented from the advent of Homo sapiens and are also known from Homo neanderthalensis contexts or even earlier. Bone has been used for making tools by virtually all hunter-gatherer societies, even when other materials were readily available.

Any part of the skeleton can potentially be utilized; however, antlers and long bones provide some of the best working material. Long bone fragments can be shaped, by scraping against an abrasive stone, into such items as arrow and spear points, needles, awls, and fish hooks. Other bone tools include spoons, knives, pins, needles, flakers, hide scrapers, and reamers.

Musical rasps, flutes, and whistles, as well as toys, have been made of bone. Decoratively carved articles of bone were also made, such as hair combs, hair pins, and pendants. Beyond the skeleton, teeth were drilled and used for decoration on clothing and necklaces. Hooves were also drilled and used as decorations on clothing, and strung as rattles and bells.

As an organic material, bone often does not survive in a way that is archaeologically recoverable. However, under the right conditions, bone tools do sometimes survive and have been recovered from locations around the world representing time periods throughout history and prehistory. Many examples have been collected ethnographically, and some traditional peoples, as well as experimental archaeologists, continue to use bone to make tools.

== History ==
The oldest excavated bone tools are from Africa and date to about 1.5 million years ago. It is widely accepted that they appeared and developed in Africa before any other geographic region. A very famous excavation of bone tools is the one at Blombos Cave in South Africa. A collection of twenty-eight bone tools was recovered from seventy thousand-year-old Middle Stone Age levels at Blombos Cave. Careful analyses of these tools reveal that formal production methods were used to create awls and projectile points.

Bone tools have been discovered in the context of Neanderthal groups and throughout the development of anatomically modern humans. Archaeologists have long believed that Neanderthals learned how to make bone tools from modern humans and by mimicking stone tools, viewing bone as simply another raw material. Modern humans, on the other hand, took advantage of bone's properties and worked it into specific shapes and tools.

A recent discovery of specialized bone tools at two Neanderthal sites in southwestern France suggests that Neanderthals may have taught modern humans how to make them. The discovery of lissoirs ("polishing stones") at these sites is significant, as they are about 51,000 years old, predating the known arrival of modern humans in Europe.

Before the Industrial Revolution (when machine mass production of sharp tools became viable), many everyday tools, such as needles, were made from bone; such items continue to be valued today as antiques. Bone folders are still used by bookbinders.

== Types ==
=== Awls ===
An awl is a long, pointed spike generally used for piercing or marking materials such as wood or leather. Bone awls are pointed tips made from any bone splinter. Bone awls vary considerably in the amount of polish from wear, the method of preparation, and size. Bone awls tend to be classified according to the characteristics of the bone used to make the awl. Many bone awls retain an epiphysis, or rounded end of a bone. Although authors have differing theories about the uses of bone awls, the two main uses agreed upon are as manipulators in basketry and as perforators in hide working.

=== Spear points and bipoints ===
Bone spear points and bipoints have been found throughout the world. A mastodon rib bone found in Washington State was discovered in the 1970s with a broken bone projectile point stuck in it. A 2011 study using radiocarbon dating found that it is about 14,000 years old. This discovery is significant because it predates the arrival of the Clovis people, and may help rewrite human history in the Americas.

=== Hoes ===
Hoes fashioned from bison scapula were common cultivating tools among the Plains Village Indians. In particular, it was used for cultivating small garden crops. It continued to be used among these Indians until French traders brought iron hoes in the 18th century. Recovered bone hoes range from 40 cm to as small as 15 cm. The size variation is due, in large part, to frequent resharpening. Bone tools were also used for digging up insect mounds for consumption, known as Entomophagy.

=== Musical instruments ===
Several different musical instruments have been created from bone. A vulture-bone flute discovered in Europe is currently considered the world's oldest musical instrument. At about 40,000 years old, the instrument dates to when modern humans were settling in the area. Researchers argue that musical instruments such as this flute helped modern humans form tighter social bonds, giving them an advantage over their Neanderthal counterparts.

In addition, bones consist of a pair of animal bones that are played by clacking the bones together. As musical instruments, they have a history dating back to ancient China, Egypt, and Greece.

=== Other types ===
Selected archaeological sites with eyed bone needles aged between 45,000 and 25,000 years BP from the ROAD database (CC BY-SA 4.0 ROCEEH)

- Harpoons and fishhooks
- Sickles
- Knives
- Daggers
- Pin-like tools
- Smoothers
- Quill flatteners
- Arrow-shaft wrenches
- Fleshers
- Hide grainers
- Beads
- Needles
- Bow and arrow
- Snares

== See also ==
- Blombos Cave
- Paleolithic tally sticks
- Bone folder
