= Miniss River =

- Location of the mouth of the Miniss River in Ontario

Location
- Country: Canada
- Province: Ontario
- Region: Northwestern Ontario
- District: Thunder Bay

Physical characteristics
- Source: Unnamed lake
  - coordinates: 50°30′00″N 90°41′09″W
  - elevation: 493 m (1,617 ft)
- Mouth: Lake St. Joseph
  - coordinates: 50°54′57″N 90°56′21″W
  - elevation: 374 m (1,227 ft)

Basin features
- River system: James Bay drainage basin
- Tributaries
  - left: St. Raphael River
  - right: De Lesseps River

The Miniss River is a river in the Unorganized Part of Thunder Bay District in Northwestern Ontario, Canada. The river is part of the James Bay drainage basin and is a tributary of Lake St. Joseph.

The river begins at an unnamed lake and flows north to Hill Lake. It turns southwest to Yam Lake, then flows northeast through Hooker Lake and Arc Lake to Miniss Lake, where it takes in the right tributary De Lesseps River. The river heads north, takes in the left tributary St. Raphael River, and reaches its mouth at Miniss Bay on Lake St. Joseph, the source of the Albany River, which flows to James Bay.

== Tributaries ==
- St. Raphael River
- De Lesseps River

== Sources ==
- Map 16 (PDF) (Map). 1 : 1,600,000. Official road map of Ontario. Ministry of Transportation of Ontario. 2014.
- Restructured municipalities - Ontario map #1 (Map). Restructuring Maps of Ontario. Ontario Ministry of Municipal Affairs and Housing. 2006.
