= Keewaywin First Nation =

Keewaywin
- Indian reserve
- Keewaywin Indian Reserve
- Location within Ontario
- Coordinates: 52°59′N 92°48′W
- Country: Canada
- Province: Ontario
- District: Kenora
- First Nation: Keewaywin

Area
  - Land: 189.78 km^{2} (73.27 sq mi)

Population (2011)
  - Total: 340
  - Density: 1.8/km^{2} (4.7/sq mi)
- Website: keewaywin.firstnation.ca

Keewaywin (Oji-Cree:ᑮᐌᐎᐣ (Giiwewin), unpointed ᑭᐌᐎᐣ) is a small Anisininew/Oji-Cree First Nation band government in Northern Ontario, located north of Red Lake, Ontario. It is connected to Sandy Lake First Nation by Sandy Lake. It is part of the Keewaytinook Okimakanak Council (Northern Chiefs) and the Nishnawbe Aski Nation. Sandy Lake First Nation Band members separated from Sandy Lake First Nation to form Keewaywin First Nation. The Indian reserve is entirely surrounded by territory of the Unorganized Kenora District.

Keewaywin is policed by the Nishnawbe-Aski Police Service, an Aboriginal-based service.
