= Leg bone =

Lower portion of a human skeleton

Leg bones are the bones found in the leg. These can include the following:

- Femur – The bone in the thigh.
- Patella – The knee cap
- Tibia – The shin bone, the larger of the two leg bones located below the knee cap
- Fibula – The smaller of the two leg bones located below the patella
