= Cat Lake (Ontario) =

- Location in Ontario
- Location: Kenora District, Ontario
- Coordinates: 51°42′02″N 91°50′53″W
- Type: Lake
- Part of: James Bay drainage basin
- Primary outflows: Cat River
- Basin countries: Canada

Cat Lake is a lake in Kenora District in Northwestern Ontario, Canada. It is the source of the Cat River. In spite of this, Cat Lake lacked fresh water for 12 years; from 2006 to 2018. The Cat Lake First Nation served by Cat Lake Airport is on the central north shore of the lake.

== See also ==
- List of lakes in Ontario
