= Birch Lake (Ontario) =

Birch Lake in Ontario, Canada may refer to one of nineteen lakes of that name:

- Birch Lake in Algoma District, NTS map sheet 041J12
- Birch Lake in Algoma District, NTS map sheet 041J06
- Birch Lake in Algoma District, NTS map sheet 041J12
- Birch Lake in Cochrane District, NTS map sheet 042A07
- Birch Lake in Frontenac County, NTS map sheet 031C10
- Birch Lake in Kenora District, NTS map sheet 052N08
- Birch Lake in Kenora District, NTS map sheet 052E10
- Birch Lake in Kenora District, NTS map sheet 052E16
- Birch Lake in Nipissing District, NTS map sheet 041P01
- Birch Lake in Parry Sound District, NTS map sheet 041H09
- Birch Lake in Rainy River District, NTS map sheet 052B03
- Birch Lake in Sudbury District, NTS map sheet 041P03
- Birch Lake in Sudbury District, NTS map sheet 042B02

== See also ==
- List of lakes in Ontario
