= Ghost River, Cochrane District =

Ghost River
- Locality
- Location in Ontario
- Coordinates: 51°28′45″N 83°24′16″W
- Country: Canada
- Province: Ontario
- District: Cochrane
- Part: Unorganized North Cochrane District
- Elevation: 73 m (240 ft)
- Time zone: UTC-5 (Eastern Time Zone)
  - Summer (DST): UTC-4 (Eastern Time Zone)
- Postal code FSA: P0L
- Area codes: 705, 249
- GNBC Code: FBHFC

Ghost River is a locality and unincorporated place on the Albany River at the mouth of the Cheepay River in the Unorganized North Part of Cochrane District in northeastern Ontario, Canada. It is on the border with Kenora District.
