= Cat River (Ontario) =

- Location of the mouth of the Cat River in Ontario

Location
- Country: Canada
- Province: Ontario
- Region: Northwestern Ontario
- District: Kenora

Physical characteristics
- Source: Cat Lake
  - coordinates: 51°35′28″N 91°54′42″W
  - elevation: 397 m (1,302 ft)
- Mouth: Lake St. Joseph
  - coordinates: 50°58′48″N 91°17′58″W
  - elevation: 374 m (1,227 ft)

Basin features
- River system: James Bay drainage basin

The Cat River is a river in the Unorganized Part of Kenora District in Northwestern Ontario, Canada. The river is part of the James Bay drainage basin, and flows from Cat Lake to Lake St. Joseph, the source of the Albany River, which flows to James Bay.

== Sources ==
- Map 16 (PDF) (Map). 1 : 1,600,000. Official road map of Ontario. Ministry of Transportation of Ontario. 2014.
- Restructured municipalities - Ontario map #2 (Map). Restructuring Maps of Ontario. Ontario Ministry of Municipal Affairs and Housing. 2006. Archived from the original on 2014-04-10.
