= Sandy Lake First Nation =

Sandy Lake 88 ᓀᑲᣞ ᓵᑲᐦᐃᑲᓃᐣᐠ Negaw-zaaga'iganiing Nitam-Anishinaabe
- Indian reserve
- Sandy Lake Indian Reserve No. 88
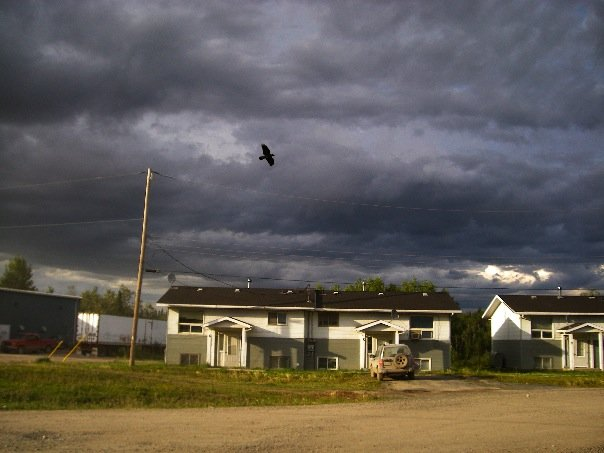

- Location within Ontario
- Coordinates: 53°05′05″N 093°17′43″W
- Country: Canada
- Province: Ontario
- District: Kenora
- First Nation: Sandy Lake

Government
  - Chief: Delores Kakegamic
  - Deputy chief: Marcel Linklater
  - Head councillor: Wayne Kakepetum

Area
  - Land: 45.69 km^{2} (17.64 sq mi)

Population (2011)
  - Total: 1,861
  - Density: 40.7/km^{2} (105/sq mi)
- Website: www.sandylake. firstnation.ca

Sandy Lake First Nation (or ᓀᑲᣞ ᓵᑲᐦᐃᑲᓃᐣᐠ, Negaw-zaaga'iganiing Nitam-Anishinaabe) is an independent Anisininew First Nations band government. The First Nations community, in the west part of Northern Ontario, is located in the Kenora District, 227 km (141 mi) northeast of Red Lake, Ontario. Its registered population in June 2007 was 2,474. As of December 2015 the total registered population reached 3,034. Sandy Lake First Nation maintains an affiliation with Nishnawbe Aski Nation, as a signatory to the Treaty 5.

Sandy Lake is policed by the Nishnawbe-Aski Police Service, an Aboriginal-based service.

== Reserve ==
The First Nation's land base is the 4,266 ha (10,540-acre) Sandy Lake 88 Reserve (Oji-Cree:ᓀᑲᣞ ᕌᑲᐦᐃᑲᓃᐣᐠ (Negaw-zaaga'iganiing). Within this reserve is the community of Sandy Lake, which during the mid-1900s was known as Waabitigweyaang (ᐙᐱᑎᑴᔮᐠ) which translates to White River. Associated with the community, the Sandy Lake First Nation maintains seven neighbourhoods grouped into five districts:

- Airport / Centre
- Big Rock / Ghost Point
- Old Sawmill
- River
- Roman Catholic

Sandy Lake is serviced by a Northern Store owned by The North West Company. The community is a fly-in community, serviced by Wasaya, Superior and Perimeter Airlines, and is linked to the rest of the province by a winter ice road that travels southwest towards Deer Lake and Pikangikum, meeting Red Lake via the Nungesser Road, which is open for approximately six weeks during the winter months.

Sandy Lake's education is maintained by the Sandy Lake Board of Education, and is serviced by three schools: Thomas Fiddler Memorial Elementary School, Thomas Fiddler Memorial High School, and Washtennigun Christian School. There is also an operational Adult Learning Center, with ties to Confederation College and Lakehead University.

== Clans ==
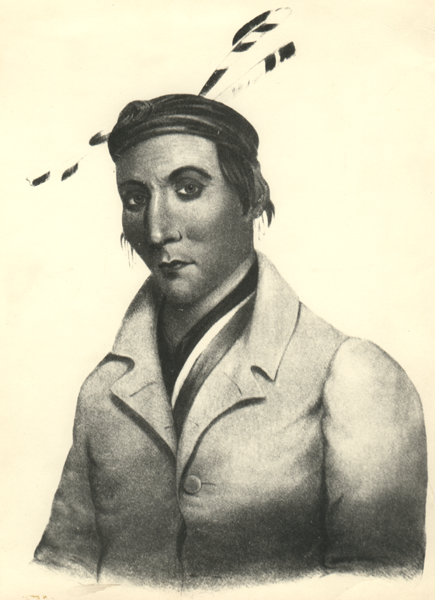
Chief Katawabeda

Five doodem are found at Sandy Lake First Nation; these five clans are the: Suckers, Pelicans, Crane, Caribou and Sturgeon.

== Language ==
The Sandy Lake First Nation speaks the Oji-Cree language and uses a variant western Ojibwe Syllabics.

== Government ==
The Sandy Lake First Nation governed by an elected Chief, a Deputy Chief and eight councillors. The current Chief is Delores Kakegamic, and the Deputy Chief is Marcel Linklater. The Head Councillor is Michelle Goodman; there are currently six Councillors and one vacancy. The councillors are Allan Rae, Fabian Crowe, Russell Kakepetum, Dennis Kakegamic, Wayne Kakepetum, and Cynthia (Cyndi) Fiddler.

In addition to the Governance Council, the Sandy Lake First Nation maintains an Elder Council to advise the Governance Council. Working with the Governance Council, six boards carry out the Council's operations: Community Development Services, Education, Health, Housing, Radio Station, and Recreation.

== Climate ==
Sandy Lake has a subarctic climate (Dfc) with cold winters and mild summers.

Climate data for Sandy Lake
Month	Jan	Feb	Mar	Apr	May	Jun	Jul	Aug	Sep	Oct	Nov	Dec	Year
Mean daily maximum °C (°F)	−15 (5)	−11 (12)	−3 (27)	7 (45)	15 (59)	21 (70)	24 (75)	23 (73)	16 (61)	7 (45)	−4 (25)	−13 (9)	6 (42)
Mean daily minimum °C (°F)	−26 (−15)	−25 (−13)	−17 (1)	−7 (19)	1 (34)	8 (46)	13 (55)	12 (54)	6 (43)	−1 (30)	−12 (10)	−22 (−8)	−6 (21)
Average precipitation mm (inches)	20.6 (0.81)	21.5 (0.85)	24.3 (0.96)	22.2 (0.87)	49.0 (1.93)	78.1 (3.07)	97.0 (3.82)	79.4 (3.13)	67.1 (2.64)	58.6 (2.31)	33.9 (1.33)	25.8 (1.02)	577.5 (22.74)
Average precipitation days	16	13	12	10	16	18	20	19	19	19	18	16	196
Source: http://www.worldweatheronline.com/Sandy-Lake-weather-averages/Ontario/CA.aspx

== Transportation ==
Sandy Lake Airport serves the community.

Sandy Lake has the ice/winter road during the winter months for people to drive in and out of the community. It starts at the end of Nungesser Road, goes through North Spirit Lake FN and next is the junction where the road splits into two, one going to Deer Lake FN and the other coming to Sandy Lake FN.

== Notable people ==
- Aysanabee
- Abe Kakepetum
- Norval Morrisseau
- Carl Ray
