= Lake St. Joseph (Ontario) =

- Location in Ontario
- Location: Kenora District and Thunder Bay District, Ontario
- Coordinates: 51°03′13″N 90°49′38″W
- Type: Lake
- Part of: James Bay drainage basin
- Primary inflows: Cat River, Doghole River, Miniss River, Pembina River
- Primary outflows: Albany River, diversion to the Root River
- Basin countries: Canada
- Max. length: 90 kilometres (56 mi)
- Max. width: 18 kilometres (11 mi)
- Surface area: 493 square kilometres (190 sq mi)
- Surface elevation: 374 metres (1,227 ft)

Lake St. Joseph is a large lake in Kenora District and Thunder Bay District in Northwestern Ontario, Canada. It is in the James Bay drainage basin and is the source of the Albany River. The east end of the lake can be reached using Ontario Highway 599 from the town of Ignace, 260 kilometres (160 mi) to the south on Ontario Highway 17. The nearest town is Pickle Lake, 30 kilometres (19 mi) north along Highway 599.

== History ==
In fur trade days, the lake was part of a canoe route west from James Bay using the Albany River, Lake St. Joseph, the Root Portage, Lac Seul, the English River, the Winnipeg River, and Lake Winnipeg. The Hudson's Bay Company established Osnaburgh House on the lake in 1786, and it operated there until 1939. Osnaburgh House was used by government officials to meet with Indigenous leaders to present one of the most significant treaty documents ever negotiated in Canada, the historical signing of Treaty 9 at Osnaburgh on July 1, 1905. Today the Osnaburgh House has been restored to closely resemble the Hudson's Bay trading post and service guests who stay at the Old Post fishing Lodge.

== Fishing ==
This lake is a large freshwater fishery with a wilderness designation. Persons wishing to fish this lake must receive a special permit from the Ontario Ministry of Natural Resources. This permit is in addition to any licenses needed. Access is restricted because of the wilderness designation. Most persons wishing to fish this lake will have to stay at one of the fishing camps operating on the eastern end of the lake. There is a fishing outpost camp and lodge located on one of the islands in the centre of the lake called Old Post Lodge. Main species are walleye, northern pike and yellow perch.

== Diversion ==
An agreement was reached between the provinces of Manitoba and Ontario to undertake a diversion of Lake St. Joseph and enacted into law in 1958. The diversion was undertaken to expand a hydroelectric generating station at the outflow from Lac Seul into the English River at Ear Falls, to augment a station at Manitou Falls further downstream on the English River, and to augment generating stations further downstream on its parent river systems — the Winnipeg River and Nelson River — on the way to Hudson Bay. Dams at Rat Rapids at the Albany River outflow at the northeast of the lake partially back up the outflow and divert water over a control dam (50°52′10″N 91°27′12″W) at the south end of Root Bay at the southwest end of the lake, into the Root River in the adjacent Lac Seul drainage basin. The diversion channel is adjacent to the historic Root Portage.

== Tributaries ==
Clockwise from the Albany River outflow at Rat Rapids

- Doran River
- Miniss River
  - St. Raphael River
  - De Lesseps River
- Cat River
- Pembina River
- Matapesatakun Creek
- Doghole River

== See also ==
- List of lakes in Ontario
