= Albany River =

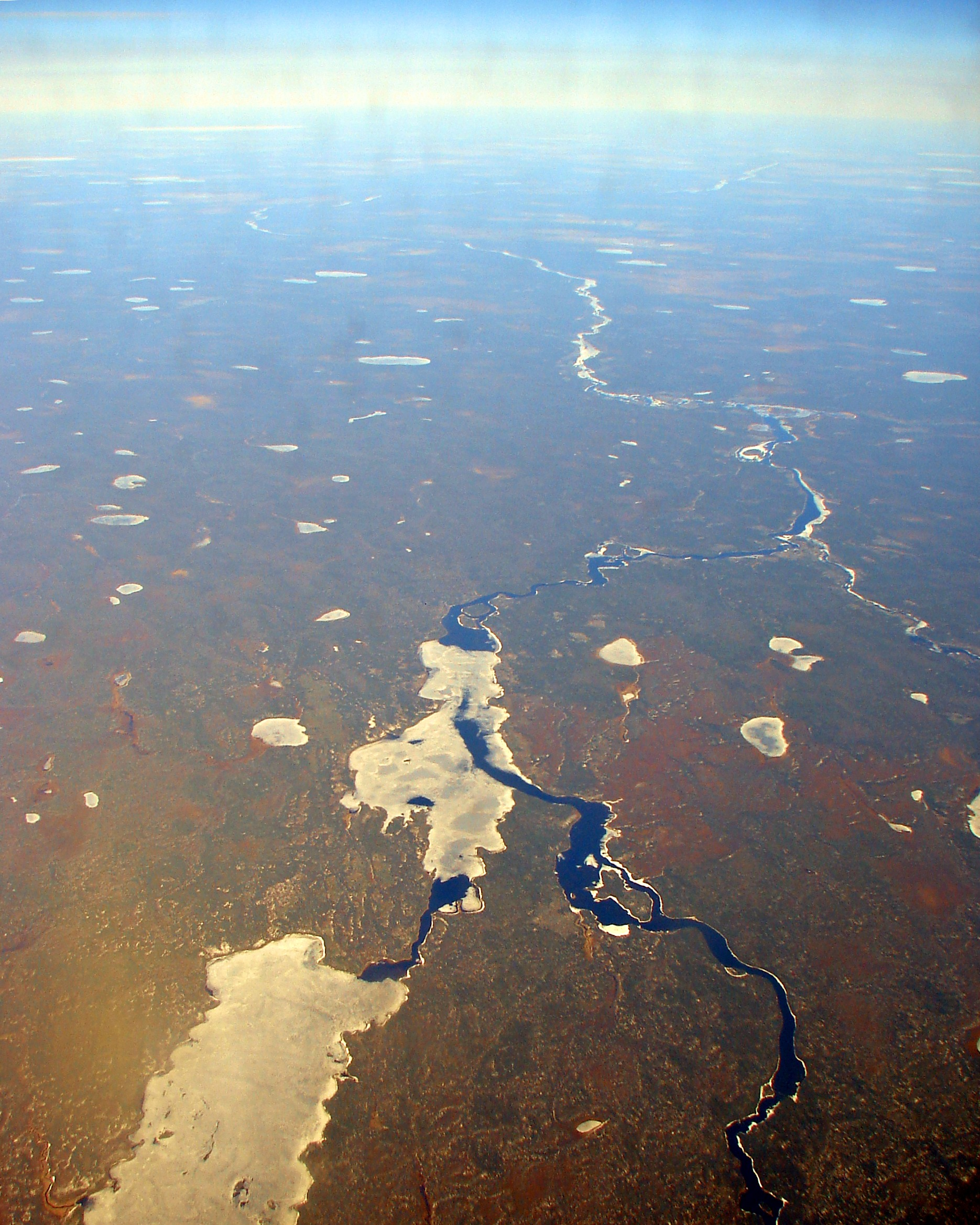
- The Albany river between the Eabametoong First Nation (out of picture), and Marten Falls First Nation in the far distance downstream

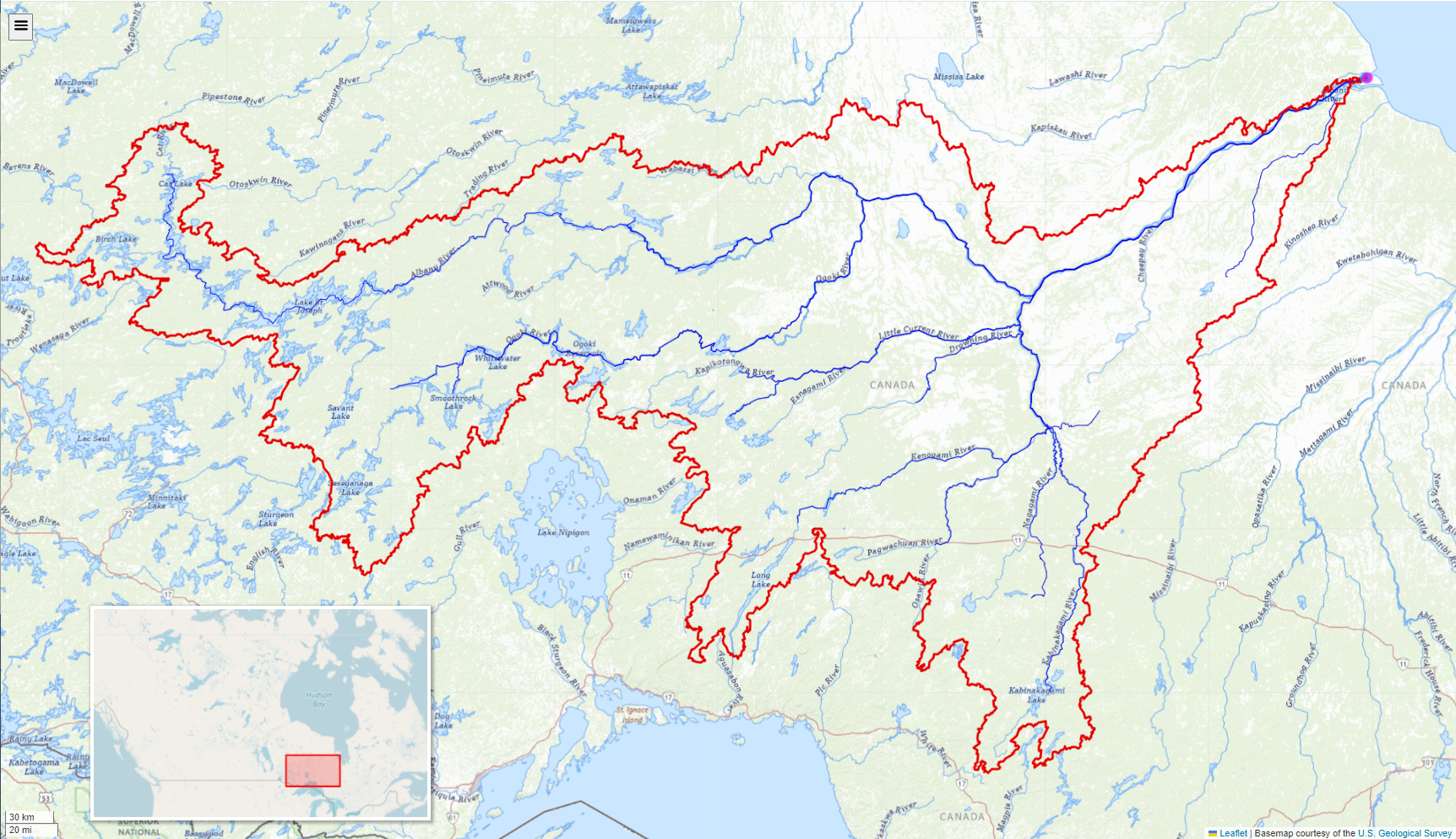
- Albany River basin

- Location of the mouth of the Albany River in Ontario Albany River (Canada)
- Etymology: named after James, Duke of York and Albany, later King James II of England

Location
- Country: Canada
- Province: Ontario
- Region: Northern Ontario
- Districts: Kenora; Thunder Bay; Cochrane

Physical characteristics
- Source: Lake St. Joseph
  - location: Unorganized Kenora District
  - coordinates: 51°11′40″N 90°13′20″W
  - elevation: 371 m (1,217 ft)
- Mouth: James Bay
  - location: Akimiski Strait
  - coordinates: 52°17′00″N 81°30′59″W
  - elevation: 0 m (0 ft)
- Length: 982 km (610 mi)
- Basin size: 135,200 km^{2} (52,200 sq mi)
- Discharge
  - average: 1,420 m^{3}/s (50,000 cu ft/s)

Basin features
- River system: James Bay drainage basin
- Tributaries
  - left: Pagashi River, Henley River, Etowamami River
  - right: Cheepay River, Streatfeild River, Kenogami River, Ogoki River, Shabuskwia River, Misehkow River

The Albany River (Cree: ᑭᐢᑕᒍ·ᐊᐣ ᓯᐱ kistachowan sipi) is a river in Northern Ontario, Canada, which flows northeast from Lake St. Joseph in Northwestern Ontario and empties into James Bay. It is 982 kilometres (610 mi) long to the head of the Cat River (a tributary of Lake St. Joseph), tying it with the Severn River for the title of longest river entirely in Ontario. Major tributaries include the Kenogami River and Ogoki River.

== Name ==
In the Muskhegowuk (Swampy Cree) language, the river is known as Kistachowan (or Chichichiwan or Chichewan) Sipi, meaning "fast, strong moving river."^{:52} According to traditional Mushkegowuk knowledge, "every curve in the river has a name".

The river was named in English after James, Duke of York and Albany, who later became King James II of England.

== History ==
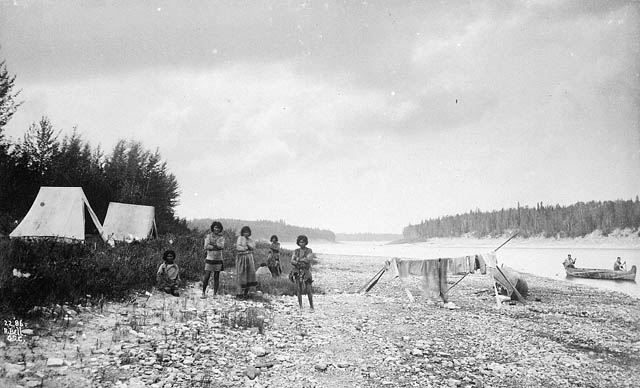
A First Nations encampment beside the Albany River, 1886

Since the Albany extends far to the west, its mouth is a natural site for a trading post. See Canadian canoe routes. Trade in the area was long contested by the English from Hudson Bay and the French on the Great Lakes. Much of the Albany basin was visited by coureurs des bois long before the English penetrated inland. In 1674 Charles Bayly of the Hudson's Bay Company (HBC) became the first European to see the Albany. Sometime before 1679 the HBC founded Fort Albany at the mouth of the river. In 1685 the French built Fort des Français at the future site of Henley House. In 1743 Henley House was established 260 kilometres (160 mi) upriver at the mouth of the Kenogami River. In 1775-76 Edward Jarvis from Henley House explored the relation between the Kenogami and the Missinaibi Rivers and went down to Michipicoten on Lake Superior. In 1777 Glouster House was built 391 kilometres (243 mi) above Henley House on Upashewey Lake. In 1779 Philip Turnor surveyed as far as Gloucester House. In 1786 Osnaburgh House was built near the outlet of Lake St. Joseph. By 1790 or so the Fort Albany trade extended all the way to Lake Winnipeg.

The land north of the Albany River was part of the Northwest Territories until 1912, when it was transferred to Ontario in the Ontario Boundaries Extension Act, 1912.

== Geography ==
The Albany River is the boundary between Kenora District to the north and the Thunder Bay and Cochrane Districts to the south.

The river begins at Lake St. Joseph at an elevation of 371 metres (1,217 ft). and flows over the Rat Rapids dam and under Ontario Highway 599 into Osnaburgh Lake. From there it flows via a Main Channel (northern) and South Channel around Kagami Island northeast, and takes in the right tributary Misehkow River and left tributary Etowamami River. The river continues over the Upper Eskakwa Falls, takes in the right tributary Shabuskwia River, and travels over the Eskakwa Falls and Snake Falls.

The river empties into the Akimiski Strait on James Bay via a series of channels. The community of Fort Albany lies on a southern channel and the Kashechewan First Nation on a northern one.

The river is navigable for the first 400 kilometres (249 mi).

=== Watershed ===
This river drains an area of 135,200 square kilometres (52,201 sq mi) and has a mean discharge of 1,420 cubic metres (50,147 cu ft) per second. For much of its length, the river defines the boundary between Kenora District and Thunder Bay & Cochrane Districts.

There are three diversions in the Albany River watershed, all diverting water from the James Bay drainage basin and all undertaken as part of hydroelectric projects. Two divert water into Lake Superior in the Great Lakes Basin: the Ogoki River has been diverted via Lake Nipigon and the Nipigon River (Long Lake Diversion, a diversion of 4,273 cubic feet (121.0 m^{3}) per second); and the headwaters of the Kenogami River have been diverted via Long Lake and the Aguasabon River (diversion of 1,377 cubic feet (39.0 m^{3}) per second). The third diverts the waters of Lake St. Joseph via the English River and Nelson River into Hudson Bay (diversion of 3,072 cubic feet (87.0 m^{3}) per second).

=== Tributaries ===
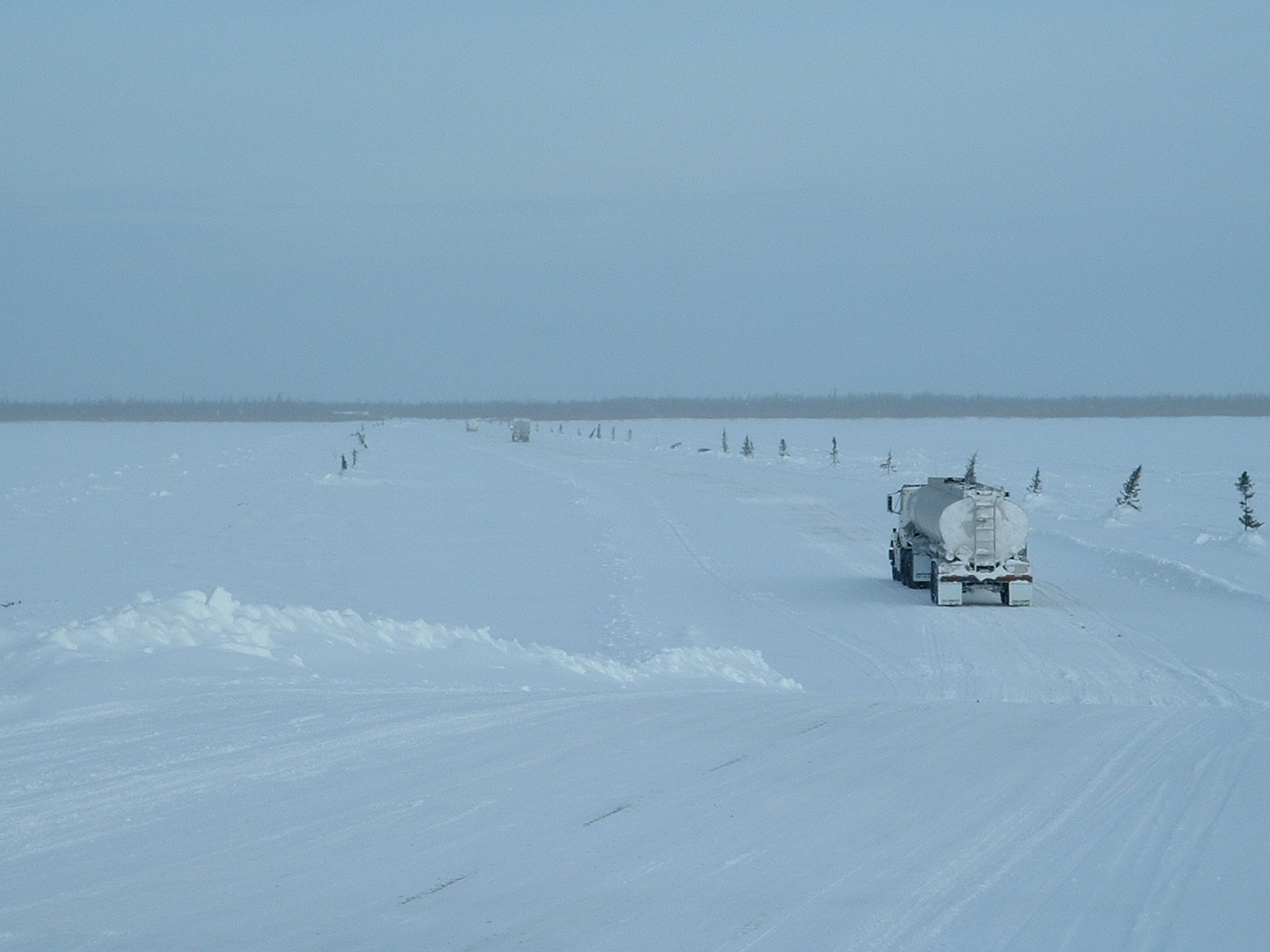
Winter road crossing the Albany River.

- Pagashi River (L)
- Cheepay River (R)
- Henley River (L)
- Streatfeild River (R)
- Kenogami River (R)
- Ogoki River (R)
- Shabuskwia River (R)
- Etowamami River (L)
- Misehkow River (R)
- Lake St. Joseph
  - Cat River

=== Communities ===
Communities along the river in upstream order:

- Kashechewan First Nation
- Fort Albany
- Ghost River, an unincorporated place at the confluence with the Cheepay River
- Ogoki Post, Marten Falls (Marten Falls First Nation)
- Eabametoong First Nation / Fort Hope, just off the main river on Eabamet Lake, connected by the Eabamet River
- Osnaburgh (Mishkeegogamang First Nation)

=== Islands ===
Several islands are found in the Albany River delta as it flows into James Bay:

- Albany Island
- Anderson Island
- Big Island
- Farfad Island (Nunavut)
- Faries Island
- Kakago Island
- Linklater Island

A number of islands upstream from Fort Albany:

- Blackbear Island
- Cheepay Island
- Comb Island
- Fishing Creek Island
- Hat Island
- Norran Island
- Oldman Island
- Sand Cherry Island

== Albany River Provincial Park ==
Albany River Provincial Park
- IUCN category II (national park)
- Interactive map of Albany River Provincial Park
- Location: Ontario, Canada
- Coordinates: 51°21′45″N 87°46′30″W
- Area: 95,100 ha (367 sq mi)
- Designation: Waterway
- Established: 1989
- Governing body: Ontario Parks

The Albany River Provincial Park protects the river and its banks from Osnaburgh Lake to the confluence with the Wabassi River. It was established in 1989 and used for backcountry canoe-camping. Features include rugged Precambrian bedrock, moraines, drumlins, and a variety of water-shaped landforms.

It is a non-operating park, meaning that there are no facilities or services. Visitors have to be experienced in travelling through isolated wilderness.

== See also ==
- List of longest rivers of Canada
- List of Ontario rivers

== Sources ==
- "Albany River". Geographical Names Data Base. Natural Resources Canada.
- "Toporama - Topographic Map Sheets 42M, 42M5, 42M6, 42N, 42O, 43A, 43B, 52P4, 52P5, 52P6, 52P7, 52P8, 52P9, 52P10, 52P11". Atlas of Canada. Natural Resources Canada. Archived from the original on 2010-02-10.
