= South Patten River =

South Patten
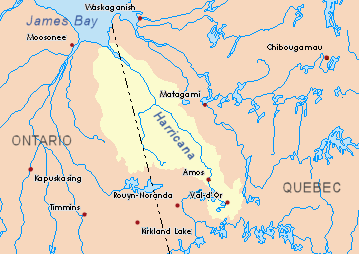
- Harricana River basin in yellow

Location
- Country: Canada
- Province: Ontario
- District: Cochrane

Physical characteristics
- Source
  - location: Cochrane District, Ontario
  - coordinates: 49°08′57″N 79°40′26″W
  - elevation: 331 m (1,086 ft)
- Mouth: Patten River
  - location: Cochrane District, Ontario
  - coordinates: 49°05′35″N 79°45′52″W
  - elevation: 290 m (950 ft)
- Length: 19.2 km (11.9 mi)

The South Patten River is a tributary of the Patten River, flowing in Cochrane District, in Northeastern Ontario, in Canada. The “South Patten River” flows in townships of Hepburn and Adair.

== Geography ==
The neighboring hydrographic slopes of the “South Patten River” are:

- North side: Patten River, Turgeon River (Ontario and Quebec);
- East side: Turgeon River (Ontario and Quebec), Boivin River (Quebec);
- South side: Chaboillez River, La Reine River (Abitibi Lake) (Quebec and Ontario);
- West side: Kabika River, East Kabika River, Case River.

The main source of the “South Patten River” is a creek (elevation: 331 metres (1,086 ft)). This source is located at:

- 18.1 kilometres (11.2 mi) West of Ontario - Quebec border;
- 20.9 kilometres (13.0 mi) North of the mouth of “South Patten River”;
- 19.4 kilometres (12.1 mi) North of the North-West Bay of Abitibi Lake.

From it source, the “South Patten River” flows on 19.2 kilometres (11.9 mi), on these segments:

- 3.0 kilometres (1.9 mi) to South-East, up to a creek (coming from South);
- 6.1 kilometres (3.8 mi) to North, then Nord-East, passing on the North-West side of a mountain (summit of 397 metres (1,302 ft)), up to a creek (coming from South);
- 10.1 kilometres (6.3 mi) to the North, snaking up to the mouth of the river.

The mouth of the Patten River empties on the West shore of Patten River. This mouth of the river is located in forest area at:

- 11.5 kilometres (7.1 mi) west of Ontario - Quebec border;
- 35.8 kilometres (22.2 mi) south of the mouth of the Patten River;
- 109.4 kilometres (68.0 mi) southwest of the mouth of Turgeon River (confluence with Harricana River;
- 28.4 kilometres (17.6 mi) North of the North-West Bay of Abitibi Lake.

== Toponymy ==
The term "Patten" refers to a family name of English origin.

== See also ==
- Patten River, a watercouse
- Turgeon River, a watercouse
- Harricana River, a watercouse
- James Bay
- Cochrane District (Ontario)
- List of rivers of Ontario
