= Perdrix River (Eeyou Istchee Baie-James) =

Perdrix
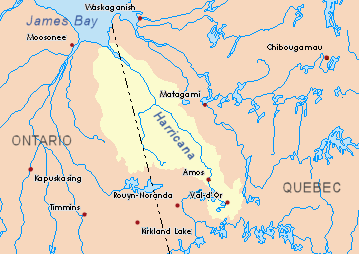
- Harricana River basin in yellow

Location
- Country: Canada
- Province: Quebec
- Region: Nord-du-Québec

Physical characteristics
- Source: Lake Perdrix
  - location: Rivière-Ojima, Quebec, Abitibi-Témiscamingue, Abitibi-Ouest, Quebec
  - coordinates: 48°58′33″N 78°40′09″W
  - elevation: 313 m (1,027 ft)
- Mouth: Wawagosic River
  - location: Eeyou Istchee Baie-James (municipality), Nord-du-Québec, Quebec
  - coordinates: 49°20′44″N 78°50′41″W
  - elevation: 267 m (876 ft)
- Length: 88.5 km (55.0 mi)

Basin features
- Tributaries
  - left: (from the mouth) Laurent creek, Trudelle River, Kanyokisinowi creek, Makamiko creek, Kaomakomiskiwag creek.

The Perdrix River is a tributary of the Wawagosic River, flowing in Quebec, Canada, in the municipalities of:

- Rivière-Ojima, Quebec (unorganized territory) in the Regional County Municipality (RCM) of Abitibi-Ouest, in the administrative region of Abitibi-Témiscamingue;
- Eeyou Istchee Baie-James, in the administrative region of Nord-du-Québec.

The course of the Perdrix River crosses the townships of Disson, Vanier and Lavergne.

Forestry is the main economic activity of the sector; recreational tourism activities, second. The area is served by some secondary forest roads.

The surface of the river is usually frozen from the end of November to the end of April, however safe ice circulation is generally from early December to mid-April.

== Geography ==
The hydrographic slopes adjacent to the Perdrix River are:

- North side: Wawagosic River, Turgeon River (Harricana River), Mistaouac River, Mistaouac Lake;
- East side: Tangente River, Wawagosic Lake, Harricana River;
- South side: Trudelle River, Authier River, Macamic River;
- West side: Menard River, Deloge Creek, Boivin River.

The Perdrix River originates at the mouth of Lake Perdrix (length: 1.3 kilometres (0.81 mi), altitude: 313 metres (1,027 ft)) in the North the unorganized territory of Rivière-Ojima, Quebec. This source is located at:

- 5.3 kilometres (3.3 mi) Southwest of the summit of Mount Disson whose summit reaches 358 metres (1,175 ft);
- 58.9 kilometres (36.6 mi) Southwest of the village center of Joutel, Quebec;
- 41.7 kilometres (25.9 mi) Southeast of the mouth of the Perdrix River (confluence with the Wawagosic River);
- 62.1 kilometres (38.6 mi) East of the border Ontario - Quebec;
- 112.9 kilometres (70.2 mi) Southeast of the mouth of the Wawagosic River (confluence with Turgeon River (Harricana River)).

From its source, the Perdrix River flows over 88.5 kilometres (55.0 mi) entirely in forest zone according to these segments:

Upper part of Perdrix River (segment of 49.5 kilometres (30.8 mi))

- 3.1 kilometres (1.9 mi) i northeasterly to the limit of the municipality of Eeyou Istchee James Bay (municipality);
- 11.3 kilometres (7.0 mi) North, then West, to a creek (coming from the South);
- 4.7 kilometres (2.9 mi) winding north to Kaomakomiskiwag Creek (from the South);
- 7.6 kilometres (4.7 mi) East, then Northeast, to Kaomakomiskiwag Creek (coming from Southeast);
- 7.9 kilometres (4.9 mi) northwesterly winding to a river bend;
- 5.0 kilometres (3.1 mi) southwesterly forming large serpentines and passing south of an unidentified lake to Makamiko Creek (from the south);
- 9.9 kilometres (6.2 mi) northwesterly, passing south of an unidentified lake, then north, collecting Kanyokisinowi Creek (coming from the Southwest) and winding to the confluence of the Trudelle River (coming from the Southwest);

Lower part of Perdrix River (segment of 39.0 kilometres (24.2 mi))

- 8.4 kilometres (5.2 mi) north, snaking to a stream Lawrence (coming from the West);
- 13.0 kilometres (8.1 mi) north through the Manadizi Rapids and Kaackakojimog Rapids to Blais Creek (from the East);
- 17.6 kilometres (10.9 mi) northerly snaking up to its mouth.

The mouth of the Perdrix River that flows to the southwest shore of the Wawagosic River is located in the forest zone at:

- 71.2 kilometres (44.2 mi) Southeast of the mouth of the Wawagosic River (confluence with the Turgeon River (Harricana River));
- 49.1 kilometres (30.5 mi) East of the border Ontario-Quebec;
- 73.7 kilometres (45.8 mi) Southeast of the mouth of the Turgeon River (Harricana River) (confluence with the Harricana River);
- 39.2 kilometres (24.4 mi) South-West of the village center of Joutel, Quebec.

== Toponymy ==
This hydronym is indicated in the "Dictionary of Rivers and Lakes of the Province of Quebec", 1925.

The term "Perdrix" (in French) or "partridge" (in English) is generally attributed to birds of the order Galliformes and the family Phasianidae. This species has two sub-families:

- the tetraonines, represented by ruffed grouse, the most widespread, designated "partridge of hardwoods"; the spruce grouse (or spruce grouse) referred to as the "fir partridge"; willow ptarmigan and rock ptarmigan (or rock ptarmigan), referred to as "white partridge";
- phasianines, including the gray partridge (or Hungarian partridge), of Eurasian origin, which is established in certain parts of Quebec.

The toponym Perdrix River was formalized on December 5, 1968, at the Commission de toponymie du Québec, i.e. at the creation of this commission.

== See also ==
- James Bay
- Jamésie
- List of rivers of Quebec
