= Théo River =

Théo
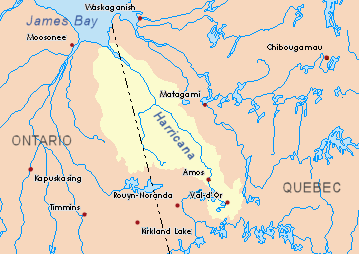
- Harricana River basin in yellow

Location
- Country: Canada
- Province: Quebec
- Region: Nord-du-Québec

Physical characteristics
- Source
  - location: Eeyou Istchee Baie-James (municipality), Quebec
  - coordinates: 49°16′11″N 79°20′04″W
- Mouth: Turgeon River
  - location: Eeyou Istchee Baie-James (municipality), Nord-du-Québec, Quebec
  - coordinates: 49°57′05″N 79°10′18″W
  - elevation: 276 m (906 ft)

The Théo River is a tributary of the Turgeon River, flowing into the Municipality of Eeyou Istchee Baie-James (municipality), in Nord-du-Québec, in Quebec, in Canada. The "Théo River" flows in the cantons of Laberge, Casa-Berardi, Raymond, Carheil and Peltrie.

Forestry is the main economic activity of the sector; recreational tourism activities, second.

The surface of the river is usually frozen from the end of November to the end of April, however safe ice circulation is generally from early December to mid-April.

== Geography ==
The surrounding hydrographic slopes of the "Theo River" are:

- North side: Turgeon River (Ontario and Quebec);
- East side: Wawagosic River, Puisseaux Creek, Mistaouac River, Harricana River;
- South side: Turgeon River, Orfroy Creek, Hal Brook;
- West side: Corset River, Turgeon River, Patten River, Burntbush River.

The source of "Theo River" is a forest stream (altitude: 305 metres (1,001 ft)) located at:

- 22.8 kilometres (14.2 mi) east of the border Ontario - Quebec;
- 63.4 kilometres (39.4 mi) South of the mouth of the Théo River;
- 63.8 kilometres (39.6 mi) south-west of the village center of Joutel.

From its source, the "Theo River" flows over 117 kilometres (73 mi) entirely in forest zone according to these segments:

- 10.3 kilometres (6.4 mi) north in the township of Laberge, to the southern limit of the township of Casa-Berardi;
- 13.0 kilometres (8.1 mi) north-east in Laberge Township, snaking to a creek (from the South);
- 19.4 kilometres (12.1 mi) northerly winding, collecting the Wabamiko and Kaackakosig streams on the west side, and the Adiko Creek (Janelle Lake outlet) on the east side, to the southern limit of the Township of Raymond;
- 33.4 kilometres (20.8 mi) northward in Raymond Township, collecting on the west side Kaockadagisig Brooks, Wijinawi Creek and the outlet of Tremblay Lake; and on the right side Raymond Creek, while winding to the southern limit of the Carheil township;
- 18.2 kilometres (11.3 mi) North in Carheil Township, collecting the outlet of Lake Philippon, winding up to the southern limit of the township of La Peltrie;
- 22.7 kilometres (14.1 mi) north winding through the township of La Peltrie to the mouth of the river.

The mouth of the "Théo River" flows to the south bank of the Turgeon River. This mouth of the river is located in the forest zone at:

- 1.1 kilometres (0.68 mi) upstream of Makwo Island on the Turgeon River;
- 24.7 kilometres (15.3 mi) west of the Ontario - Quebec border;
- 17.5 kilometres (10.9 mi) west of the mouth of the Turgeon River;
- 53.5 kilometres (33.2 mi) northwest of the village center of Joutel.

== Toponymy ==
The term "Theo" refers to a diminutive of the first name "Theophilus" (or “Théophile” in French) of French origin.

The toponym "Théo River" was formalized on December 5, 1968, at the Commission de toponymie du Québec, at the creation of this commission.

== See also ==
- Turgeon River, a watercourse
- Harricana River, a watercourse
- James Bay
- Eeyou Istchee James Bay (municipality)
- List of rivers of Quebec
