= Corset River =

Corset
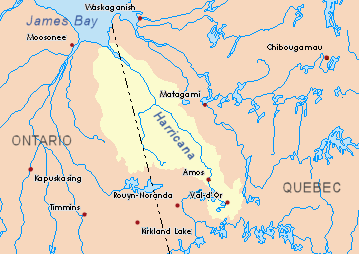
- Harricana River basin in yellow

Location
- Country: Canada
- Province: Quebec
- Region: Nord-du-Québec

Physical characteristics
- Source: Forested creek
  - location: Eeyou Istchee Baie-James (municipality), Nord-du-Québec, Quebec
  - coordinates: 49°22′38″N 79°15′44″W
  - elevation: 302 m (991 ft)
- Mouth: Turgeon River (Harricana River)
  - location: Eeyou Istchee Baie-James (municipality), Nord-du-Québec, Quebec
  - coordinates: 49°31′15″N 79°24′11″W
  - elevation: 259 m (850 ft)
- Length: 37.6 km (23.4 mi)

The Corset River (French: Rivière du Corset) is a tributary of the Turgeon River, flowing into the municipality of Eeyou Istchee Baie-James (municipality), in Nord-du-Québec, in Quebec, in Canada. The Corset River flows in the townships of Laberge, Collet and Dieppe.

Forestry is the main economic activity of the sector; recreational tourism activities, second.

The surface of the river is usually frozen from the end of November to the end of April, however safe ice circulation is generally from early December to mid-April.

== Geography ==
The hydrographic slopes near the Corset River are:

- North side: Turgeon River (Ontario and Quebec);
- East side: Théo River, Wawagosic River, Memegweci Creek;
- South side: Turgeon River, Orfroy Creek;
- West side: Turgeon River, Patten River.

The source of the Corset River is a forest stream (altitude: 302 metres (991 ft)) located at:

- 19 kilometres (12 mi) East of the Ontario - Quebec border;
- 19.5 kilometres (12.1 mi) South-Est of the mouth of the Corset River;
- 69.6 kilometres (43.2 mi) South-West of the village center of Joutel, Quebec.

From its source, the Corset River flows over 37.6 kilometres (23.4 mi) entirely in forest zone according to these segments:

- 6.7 kilometres (4.2 mi) westerly in the township of Laberge, to the eastern limit of the township of Collet;
- 16.4 kilometres (10.2 mi) North-West in the township of Collet, winding up to the southern limit of the township of Dieppe;
- 14.5 kilometres (9.0 mi) North in the Dieppe Township, snaking to the mouth of the river.

The mouth of the Corset River flows on the South bank of the Turgeon River (Harricana River), opposite of Corset Island (length: 3.9 kilometres (2.4 mi); width: 2.1 kilometres (1.3 mi)). This mouth of the river is located in the forest zone at:

- 7.0 kilometres (4.3 mi) West of the Ontario - Quebec border;
- 64.7 kilometres (40.2 mi) Southwest of the mouth of the Turgeon River (Harricana River);
- 81 kilometres (50 mi) West of the village center of Joutel, Quebec.

== Toponymy ==
The French term "Du Corset" refers to a family name of French origin.

== See also ==
- Corset Island (French: Île Du Corset)
- Harricana River, a watercourse
- James Bay
- Eeyou Istchee James Bay (municipality)
- List of rivers of Quebec
