= Ojima =

Ojima may refer to:

- Ojima (surname), a Japanese surname
- Ojima, Gunma, a town merged into the city of Ōta, Gunma Prefecture, Japan
- Ojima Station, a railway station in Kōtō, Tokyo, Japan
- Higashi-ojima Station, a railway station in Kōtō, Tokyo, Japan
- Nishi-ojima Station, a railway station in Kōtō, Tokyo, Japan
- Ojima Domain, also known as Kojima Domain, a Japanese domain of the Edo period
- Ojima River, a tributary of Turgeon Lake in Quebec, Canada
- Rivière-Ojima, Quebec, an unorganized territory of RCM Abitibi-Ouest, in Quebec, Canada
- Ou Island, an island in Okinawa, Japan

== See also ==
- Ojima lactam, an organic compound of some importance in the commercial production of Taxol
