= Menard River =

Menard
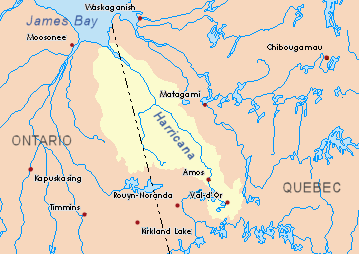
- Harricana River basin in yellow

Location
- Country: Canada
- Province: Quebec
- Region: Nord-du-Québec

Physical characteristics
- Source: Lake Jos-Doire
  - location: Eeyou Istchee Baie-James (municipality), Nord-du-Québec, Quebec
  - coordinates: 49°11′22″N 79°00′53″W
  - elevation: 354 m (1,161 ft)
- Mouth: Wawagosic River
  - location: Eeyou Istchee Baie-James (municipality), Nord-du-Québec, Quebec
  - coordinates: 49°24′28″N 79°59′18″W
  - elevation: 262 m (860 ft)
- Length: 40.3 km (25.0 mi)

The Ménard River is a tributary of the Wawagosic River, flowing into the municipality of Eeyou Istchee James Bay (municipality), in the administrative region of Nord-du-Québec, in Quebec, in Canada. The course of the Ménard River crosses successively the cantons of Lemaire and Brabazon.

Forestry is the main economic activity of the sector; recreational tourism activities, second. The area is served by some secondary forest roads.

The surface of the river is usually frozen from the end of November to the end of April, however safe ice circulation is generally from early December to mid-April.

== Geography ==
The surrounding hydrographic slopes of the Ménard River are:

- Northside: Wawagosic River, Turgeon River, Obakamigacici Creek, Kadabakato River;
- East side: Partridge River, Angle River, Harricana River;
- South side: Turgeon Lake, Kadabakato River, Wawagosic River;
- West side: Boivin River, Orfroy Creek, Hal Creek, Patten River.

The Ménard River rises at the mouth of a Jos-Doire Lake (length: 0.5 kilometres (0.31 mi), altitude: 354 metres (1,161 ft)) in the Lemaire Township which is surrounded of marsh areas. This lake is located at:

- 1.0 kilometre (0.62 mi) Southwest of the summit of Mount Deloge, the highest peak at 465 metres (1,526 ft);
- 14.2 kilometres (8.8 mi) North-East of the village center of Villebois, Quebec;
- 24.3 kilometres (15.1 mi) South of the mouth of the Ménard River (confluence with the Wawagosic River);
- 36.7 kilometres (22.8 mi) East of the border Ontario-Quebec;
- 86.4 kilometres (53.7 mi) southeast of the mouth of the Wawagosic River (confluence with Turgeon River).

From its source, the "Menard River" flows over 40.3 kilometres (25.0 mi) entirely in forest zone according to these segments:

- 9.6 kilometres (6.0 mi) northwesterly in Lemaire township, to a creek (from the southwest);
- 6.3 kilometres (3.9 mi) northwesterly to the southerly limit of Brabazon township;
- 8.5 kilometres (5.3 mi) in Brabazon Township northward, then northeastward, forming numerous small streamers, up to a creek (from the west);
- 2.6 kilometres (1.6 mi) northerly snaking to a creek (coming from the northwest);
- 13.3 kilometres (8.3 mi) North-East winding up at the beginning of the segment, to its mouth.

The mouth of the "Menard River" which flows on the southwest shore of the Wawagosic River is located in the forest zone at:

- 62.3 kilometres (38.7 mi) Southeast of the mouth of the Wawagosic River (confluence with Turgeon River);
- 38.4 kilometres (23.9 mi) East of the border Ontario - Quebec;
- 67.1 kilometres (41.7 mi) South of the mouth of the Turgeon River (confluence with the Harricana River);
- 49.8 kilometres (30.9 mi) southwest of the village center of Joutel.

== Toponymy ==
The term "Ménard" is a family name of French origin.

The toponym "Ménard River" was formalized on December 5, 1968, at the Commission de toponymie du Québec, at the creation of this commission.

== See also ==
- Wawagosic River, a watercourse
- Turgeon River, a watercourse
- Harricana River, a watercourse
- James Bay
- James Bay
- Eeyou Istchee Baie-James (municipality), a municipality
- List of rivers of Quebec
