= East Mikwam River =

East Mikwam
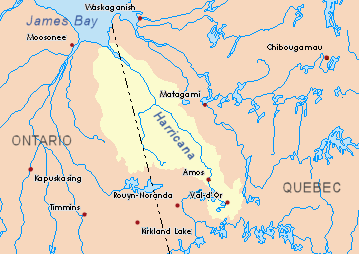
- Harricana River basin in yellow

Location
- Country: Canada
- Province: Ontario
- District: Cochrane

Physical characteristics
- Source
  - location: Cochrane District, Ontario
  - coordinates: 49°16′33″N 80°51′33″W
  - elevation: 324 m (1,063 ft)
- Mouth: Mikwam River
  - location: Cochrane District, Ontario
  - coordinates: 49°33′48″N 79°55′29″W
  - elevation: 300 m (980 ft)
- Length: 19.4 km (12.1 mi)

The East Mikwam River is a tributary of the Mikwam River, flowing into the Cochrane District, in the north-east of Ontario, in Canada.

Forestry is the main economic activity of the sector; recreational tourism activities, second. The west side of this slope is served by Ontario road 652.

The surface of the river is usually frozen from early November to mid-May, however, safe ice movement is generally from mid-November to the end of April.

== Geography ==
The adjacent hydrographic slopes of the East Mikwam River are:

- North side: Mikwam River, Burntbush River, Lawagamau River;
- East side: Tomlinson Creek, Kakika River, Burntbush River, Porphyry Creek;
- South side: Seguin River, Kenning River, Kabika River;
- West side: Mikwam River, South Floodwood River, Floodwood River, Little Abitibi River.

The East Mikwam River originates from a mountain stream (elevation: 324 metres (1,063 ft)).

From its source, the East Mikwam River flows on 19.4 kilometres (12.1 mi) according to the following segments:

- 8.1 kilometres (5.0 mi) northwesterly, in Kenning Township, to the southern limit of Tomlinson Township;
- 3.6 kilometres (2.2 mi) northwesterly in Tomlinson Township to the easterly limit of Newman Township;
- 7.7 kilometres (4.8 mi) westward in Newman Township, then north to mouth.

The confluence of the East Mikwam River is located in Newman Township at 42.7 kilometres (26.5 mi) west of the Ontario - Quebec border; 25 kilometres (16 mi) south of the mouth of the Mikwam River; 42.0 kilometres (26.1 mi) west of the mouth of the Burntbush River; 89.6 kilometres (55.7 mi) south-east of a bay south of Kesagami Lake and 20.1 kilometres (12.5 mi) southeasterly of Ontario Highway 652.

== Toponymy ==
The following names are of the same origin and are in the same area of the Cochrane District: Mikwam River, Little Mikwam River, East Mikwam River, Mikwam Lake, Little Mikwam Lake and Upper Mikwam Lake.

== See also ==
- Mikwam River, a watercourse
- Burntbush River, a watercourse
- Turgeon River, a watercourse
- Harricana River, a watercourse
- James Bay
- Cochrane District (Ontario)
- List of rivers of Ontario
