= Kenning River =

Kenning
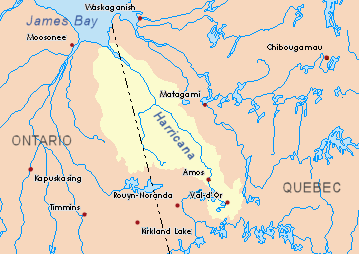
- Harricana River basin in yellow

Location
- Country: Canada
- Province: Ontario
- District: Cochrane

Physical characteristics
- Source
  - location: Cochrane District, Ontario
  - coordinates: 49°08′26″N 79°56′40″W
  - elevation: 309 m (1,014 ft)
- Mouth: Case River
  - location: Cochrane District, Ontario
  - coordinates: 49°22′04″N 80°11′59″W
  - elevation: 294 m (965 ft)
- Length: 19.1 km (11.9 mi)

The Kenning River is a tributary of the Case River, flowing into the Cochrane District, in Northeastern Ontario, in Canada. The course of this river crosses the townships of Kenning and Case.

Forestry is the main economic activity of the sector; recreational tourism activities, second.

The surface of the river is usually frozen from early November to mid-May, however, safe movement on ice is generally from mid-November to the end of April.

== Geography ==
The surrounding hydrographic slopes of the Kenning River are:

- North side: Mikwam River, East Mikwam River;
- East side: Kabika River, East Kabika River, Case River;
- South side: Mace Creek, Abitibi Lake, Little Kaminisinakwa River;
- West side: Little Joe Creek, Seguin River.

The Kenning River originates at the mouth of Kenning Lake (length: 0.9 metres (2 ft 11 in); elevation: 309 metres (1,014 ft)) in the township of Case. Its mouth is located at 22.0 kilometres (13.7 mi) north of the North-West Bay of Abitibi Lake.

From the mouth of Kenning Lake, the Kenning River flows over 19.1 kilometres (11.9 mi) according to the following segments:

- 8.6 kilometres (5.3 mi) northeasterly in the township of Case, to the boundary of Kenning Township;
- 5.3 kilometres (3.3 mi) northeasterly in Kenning Township to a bend in the river;
- 3.2 kilometres (2.0 mi) south-east to a bend in the river;
- 2.0 kilometres (1.2 mi) northeasterly to mouth.

The confluence of the Kenning River in Kenning Township, to:

- 31.2 kilometres (19.4 mi) west of the Ontario - Quebec border;
- 10.8 kilometres (6.7 mi) south-west of the mouth of the Case River (confluence with the Kabika River);
- 27.1 kilometres (16.8 mi) southwesterly of the mouth of the Kabika River (confluence with the Burntbush River);
- 41.2 kilometres (25.6 mi) southwesterly of the mouth of the Burntbush River (confluence with the Turgeon River);
- 28.8 kilometres (17.9 mi) north of Northwest Bay of Abitibi Lake.

== Toponymy ==
The term "Kenning" is a family name of English origin.

== See also ==
- River Case, a watercourse
- Kabika River, a watercourse
- Burntbush River, a watercourse
- Turgeon River, a watercourse
- Harricana River, a watercourse
- James Bay
- Cochrane District (Ontario)
- Northeastern Ontario
- List of rivers of Ontario
