= Chabbie River =

Chabbie
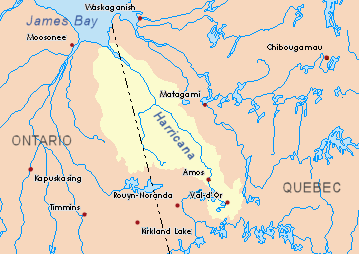
- Harricana River basin in yellow

Location
- Country: Canada
- Province: Ontario
- District: Cochrane

Physical characteristics
- Source
  - location: Cochrane District, Ontario
  - coordinates: 49°43′16″N 79°56′39″W
  - elevation: 309 m (1,014 ft)
- Mouth: Turgeon River
  - location: Cochrane District, Ontario
  - coordinates: 49°30′15″N 79°30′52″W
  - elevation: 270 m (890 ft)
- Length: 52.7 km (32.7 mi)

The Chabbie River is a tributary of the Turgeon River flowing through Canada, in:

- Cochrane District, Northeastern Ontario;
- Eeyou Istchee Baie-James (municipality), in Jamésie, in the administrative region of Nord-du-Québec in Québec.

Forestry is the main economic activity of the sector; recreational tourism activities, second.

The surface of the river is usually frozen from early November to mid-May, but safe circulation on the ice generally occurs from mid-November to the end of April.

== Geography ==
The main hydrographic slopes adjacent to the Chabbie River are:

- North side: Turcotte River, Little Turcotte River;
- East Side: Turcotte River, Turgeon River;
- South side: Burntbush River, Kabika River (Ontario), Patten River;
- West side: Burntbush River, Burntbush River, Tweed North River.

The Chabbie River originates at the mouth of a forest brook (altitude: 309 metres (1,014 ft)) feeding on a small marsh area in the eastern part of the Cochrane District, in Ontario.

The mouth of the small head lake is located at:

- 26.4 kilometres (16.4 mi) west of the boundary between Ontario and Quebec;
- 35.8 kilometres (22.2 mi) northwest of the mouth of the Chabbie River (confluence with the Turgeon River);
- 73.1 kilometres (45.4 mi) southwest of the mouth of the Turgeon River (in Quebec);
- 55.3 kilometres (34.4 mi) southeast of a southern bay of Kesagami Lake in Ontario.

From the mouth of the small head lake, the Chabbie River runs on 52.7 kilometres (32.7 mi) according to the following segments:

- 11.8 kilometres (7.3 mi)) to south-east, then south-westerly, to the mouth of the "North Chabbie Lake" which flows through {convert|0.7|km} to the South-East;
- 10.4 kilometres (6.5 mi) to the south-east including through a small unidentified lake (length: 1.0 kilometre (0.62 mi)) and the northern part of Lake Chabbie to the northeast to its mouth;
- 3.9 kilometres (2.4 mi) southeasterly to the north boundary of Noseworthy Township;
- 2.9 kilometres (1.8 mi)southeasterly to the west boundary of Bradette Township;
- 21.4 kilometres (13.3 mi) to the southeast in Bradette Township, then eastward to the boundary between Ontario and Quebec;
- 0.3 kilometres (0.19 mi)eastward in the Township of Dieppe in Quebec to the mouth.

The Chabbie River flows on the west bank of the Turgeon River. This confluence is located at:

- 0.3 kilometres (0.19 mi) east of the boundary between Quebec and Ontario;
- 69.6 kilometres (43.2 mi) southwest of the mouth of the Turgeon River (confluence with the Harricana River);
- 87 kilometres (54 mi) southeast of a southern bay of Kesagami Lake in Ontario.

== Toponymy ==
The term "Turcotte" is a surname of family of French origine.

== See also ==
- Northeastern Ontario
- Turcotte River, a watercourse
- Turgeon River, a watercourse
- Harricana River, a watercourse
- James Bay, a body of water
