= Little Turcotte River =

Little Turcotte
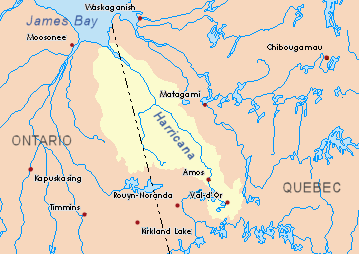
- Harricana River basin in yellow

Location
- Country: Canada
- Province: Ontario
- District: Cochrane

Physical characteristics
- Source
  - location: Cochrane District, Ontario
  - coordinates: 49°06′52″N 79°28′37″W
  - elevation: 304 m (997 ft)
- Mouth: Turcotte River
  - location: Cochrane District, Ontario
  - coordinates: 49°41′50″N 79°42′33″W
  - elevation: 270 m (890 ft)
- Length: 13.7 km (8.5 mi)

Basin features
- Tributaries
  - right: Turgeon River

The Little Turcotte River is a tributary of the Turcotte River, flowing in the Cochrane District, in Northeastern Ontario, in Canada.

Forestry is the main economic activity of the sector; recreational tourism activities, second.

The surface of the river is usually frozen from early November to mid-May, but safe circulation on the ice generally occurs from mid-November to the end of April.

== Geography ==
The main slopes waters of the "Little Turcotte River" are:

- North side: Detour River;
- East side: Turgeon River, Garneau River;
- South side: Turcotte River, Burntbush River, Kabika River, Chabbie River;
- West side: Turcotte River, Chabbie River, Burntbush River.

The "Little Turcotte River" originates at the mouth of a small unidentified lake (length: 0.2 kilometres (0.12 mi); altitude: 304 metres (997 ft)) in the eastern part of the Cochrane District, in Ontario.

The mouth of the small head lake is located at:

- 13.9 kilometres (8.6 mi) west of the boundary between Ontario and Quebec;
- 11.5 kilometres (7.1 mi) northwest of the mouth of the "Petite Rivière Turcotte" (confluence with the Turcotte River);
- 25.3 kilometres (15.7 mi) northwest of the mouth of the Turcotte River (confluence with the Turgeon River, in Quebec);
- 65.0 kilometres (40.4 mi) southwest of the mouth of the Turgeon River (in Quebec);
- 60.6 kilometres (37.7 mi) southeast of a southern bay of Kesagami Lake in Ontario.

From the mouth of the small head lake, the "Little Turcotte River" flows on 13.7 kilometres (8.5 mi) according to the following segments:

- 6.7 kilometres (4.2 mi) to the south, curving eastward to the mouth of the Little Turcotte Lake, which the current passes through on {convert|0.8|km};
- 7.0 kilometres (4.3 mi) to South-East by crossing a marsh zone at the beginning of this section.

The "Little Turcotte River" flows into a river bend on the northern shore of the Turcotte River. This confluence is located at:

- 8.8 kilometres (5.5 mi) east of the boundary between Quebec and Ontario;
- 14.0 kilometres (8.7 mi) southwest of the mouth of the Turcotte River (confluence with the Turgeon River);
- 67.5 kilometres (41.9 mi) southwest of the mouth of the Turgeon River (confluence with the Harricana River);
- 72.2 kilometres (44.9 mi) southeast of a southern bay of Kesagami Lake in Ontario.

== Toponymy ==
The term "Turcotte" is a surname of family of French origin.

== See also ==
- List of rivers of Ontario
