= Tangente River =

Tangente
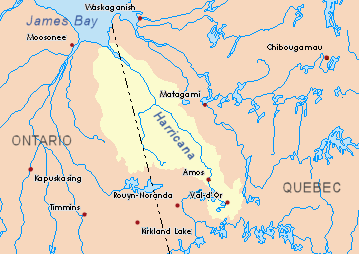
- Harricana River basin in yellow

Location
- Country: Canada
- Province: Quebec
- Region: Nord-du-Québec

Physical characteristics
- Source: Lake Wawagosic
  - location: Eeyou Istchee Baie-James (municipality), Nord-du-Québec, Quebec
  - coordinates: 49°19′58″N 78°41′07″W
  - elevation: 278 m (912 ft)
- Mouth: Wawagosic River
  - location: Eeyou Istchee Baie-James (municipality), Nord-du-Québec, Quebec
  - coordinates: 49°18′08″N 78°44′31″W
  - elevation: 271 m (889 ft)
- Length: 6.6 km (4.1 mi)

The Tangent River is a tributary of the Wawagosic River, flowing in the municipality of Eeyou Istchee Baie-James (municipality), in the administrative region of Nord-du-Québec, in Quebec, in Canada. The course of the "Tangent River" crosses the township Bacon.

Forestry is the main economic activity of the sector; recreational tourism activities, second. The area is served by some secondary forest roads.

The surface of the river is usually frozen from the end of November to the end of April, however safe ice circulation is generally from early December to mid-April.

== Geography ==
The hydrographic slopes adjacent to the "Tangente River" are:

- North side: Plamondon River, Kadabakato River, Mistaouac River, Mistaouac Lake, Angle River;
- East side: Wawagosic Lake, Nonan Creek, Harricana River;
- South side: Promenade Creek, Saucer Creek, Wawagosic River;
- West side: Wawagosic River, Perdrix River (Eeyou Istchee Baie-James).

The "Tangent River" originates at the mouth of "Wawagosic Lake" (length: 4.4 kilometres (2.7 mi), altitude: 278 metres (912 ft)), which is the west side of the lake, at:

- 31.0 kilometres (19.3 mi) Southwest of the village center of Joutel;
- 5.4 kilometres (3.4 mi) Northeast of the mouth of the "Tangente River" (confluence with the Wawagosic River);
- 60.5 kilometres (37.6 mi) East of the border Ontario - Quebec;
- 76.2 kilometres (47.3 mi) Southeast of the mouth of the Wawagosic River (confluence with the Turgeon River (Eeyou Istchee Baie-James)).

From the mouth of Wawagosic Lake, the "Tangente River" flows over 6.6 kilometres (4.1 mi) entirely in forest zone according to these segments:

- 3.0 kilometres (1.9 mi) southwesterly to a creek (coming from the northwest);
- 3.6 kilometres (2.2 mi) southwesterly to mouth.

The mouth of the "Tangente River" which flows into a bend of the river on the north shore of the Wawagosic River is located in the forest zone at:

- 78.0 kilometres (48.5 mi) Southeast of the mouth of the Wawagosic River (confluence with Turgeon River (Eeyou Istchee Baie-James));
- 56.5 kilometres (35.1 mi) East of the Ontario - Quebec border;
- 80.1 kilometres (49.8 mi) Southeast of the mouth of the Turgeon River (Eeyou Istchee Baie-James) (confluence with the Harricana River);
- 36.2 kilometres (22.5 mi) Southwest of the village center of Joutel, Quebec.

== Toponymy ==
The toponym "Tangente River" was formalized on December 5, 1968, at the Commission de toponymie du Québec, i.e. at the creation of this commission.

== See also ==
- Wawagosic River, a watercourse
- Turgeon River (Eeyou Istchee Baie-James), a watercourse
- Harricana River, a watercourse
- James Bay
- Jamésie
- Eeyou Istchee Baie-James (municipality), a municipality
- List of rivers of Quebec
