= Ojima River =

Ojima
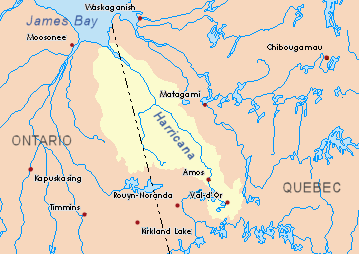
- Harricana River basin in yellow

Location
- Country: Canada
- Province: Quebec
- Region: Abitibi-Témiscamingue

Physical characteristics
- Source: Swamp pond
  - location: Rivière-Ojima, Quebec (territoire non organisé), Abitibi-Ouest (MRC), Quebec
  - coordinates: 48°54′20″N 78°57′24″W
  - elevation: 314 m (1,030 ft)
- Mouth: Lake Turgeon
  - location: Rivière-Ojima, Quebec (territoire non organise), Abitibi-Témiscamingue, Quebec
  - coordinates: 48°59′06″N 79°59′00″W
  - elevation: 288 m (945 ft)

Basin features
- Tributaries
  - left: (from the mouth) Savard branch, discharge of lake Kapukwacata.
  - right: Deception creek

The Ojima River is a tributary of Lake Turgeon, flowing in the township of Chazel, into the unorganized territory of Rivière-Ojima, Quebec and into the municipality of Val-Saint-Gilles, Quebec, in the regional county municipality (RCM) of Abitibi-Ouest, in the administrative region of Abitibi-Temiscamingue, in Quebec, in Canada.

Forestry is the main economic activity of the sector; recreational tourism activities, second.

The surface of the river is usually frozen from the end of November to the end of April, however safe ice circulation is generally from early December to mid-April.

== Geography ==
The hydrographic slopes near the "Ojima River" are:

- North side: Lake Turgeon, Kodiga Creek;
- East side: Deception Creek, Trudelle River, Perdrix River (Eeyou Istchee Baie-James);
- South side: La Sarre River, Macamic Lake, Chazel Creek;
- West side: Brodeur Stream, Lavergne River, Morin Stream, Leslie Creek.

The "Ojima River" originates at the mouth of a pond (length: 1.9 kilometres (1.2 mi); altitude: 314 metres (1,030 ft)) in a marsh area located at:

- 4.0 kilometres (2.5 mi) South-West of Oditan Hill (summit elevation: 457 metres (1,499 ft);
- 42.2 kilometres (26.2 mi) East of the border Ontario-Quebec;
- 10.7 kilometres (6.6 mi) South-East of the mouth of the Ojima River;
- 22.1 kilometres (13.7 mi) North-East of downtown La Sarre, Quebec.

From its source, the "Ojima River" flows over 19.2 kilometres (11.9 mi) entirely in forest zone according to these segments:

- 9.0 kilometres (5.6 mi) northwesterly in Chazel Township, up to 6th and 7th East Range Road, that it cut at 2.5 kilometres (1.6 mi) to the West from the village center of Saint-Eugène-de-Chazel;
- 10.2 kilometres (6.3 mi) towards the North-East by forming a loop towards the West where it crosses on 1.1 kilometres (0.68 mi) the Eastern part of the municipality of Val-Saint-Gilles, Quebec, and snaking at the end of the segment up to the mouth of the river.

The mouth of the "Ojima River" flows into a marsh area on the south shore of Lake Turgeon. This mouth of the river is located in the forest zone at:

- 8.2 kilometres (5.1 mi) South-East of the mouth of Lake Turgeon;
- 57.2 kilometres (35.5 mi) East of the Ontario-Quebec border;
- 115 kilometres (71 mi) South-East of the mouth of the Lake Turgeon;
- 13.7 kilometres (8.5 mi) North-East of the village center of Val-Saint-Gilles.

== Toponymy ==
The toponym "Ojijma River" was formalized on December 5, 1968, at the Commission de toponymie du Québec, at the creation of this commission.

== See also ==
- Harricana River, a watercourse
- James Bay
- Val-Saint-Gilles, a municipality
- Rivière-Ojima, Quebec, an unorganized territory
- List of rivers of Quebec
