= Garneau River =

Garneau
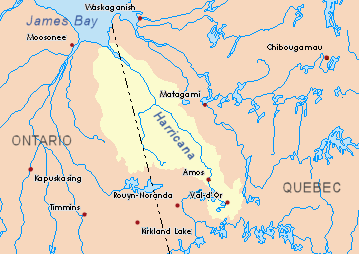
- Harricana River basin in yellow

Location
- Country: Canada
- Provinces: Ontario; Quebec
- District: Cochrane (Ontario)
- Region: Nord-du-Québec (Quebec)

Physical characteristics
- Source: Lake Garneau
  - location: Cochrane District, Ontario
  - coordinates: 49°42′30″N 79°33′10″W
  - elevation: 286 m (938 ft)
- Mouth: Turgeon River
  - location: Eeyou Istchee Baie-James (municipalité), Quebec
  - coordinates: 49°43′14″N 79°24′49″W
  - elevation: 259 m (850 ft)

The Garneau River is a tributary of the Turgeon River flowing in Canada in:

- Cochrane District, Northeastern Ontario
- Nord-du-Québec, in Jamésie, in the municipality of Eeyou Istchee Baie-James (municipality) in the township of Récher

The surface of the river is usually frozen from early from November to mid-May, but safe circulation on the ice generally occurs from mid-November to the end of April.

== Geography ==
The main watersheds adjacent to the Garneau River are:

- North side: Kaokonimawaga Creek, Detour River, Turgeon River
- East side: Makwo Creek, Wijinawi Creek, Theo River, Wawagosic River
- South side: Adimoskadjiwi Creek, Turcotte River, Turgeon River
- West side: Turcotte River, Little Turcotte River (Ontario)

The Garneau River originates at the mouth of a lake Garneau (length: 0.3 metres (1 ft 0 in); elevation: 286 metres (938 ft)), in Cochrane District, in Ontario.

The mouth of Lake Garneau is located at:

- 2.3 kilometres (1.4 mi) at west of the boundary between Ontario and Quebec
- 10.1 kilometres (6.3 mi) at southeast of the mouth of the Garneau River
- 54.9 kilometres (34.1 mi) at south of the mouth of the Turgeon River (in Quebec)
- 66.9 kilometres (41.6 mi) at southeast of a southern bay of Kesagami Lake (in Ontario)

From its source, the Garneau River flows on 22.9 kilometres (14.2 mi) according to the following segments:

- 4.2 kilometres (2.6 mi) southwest by crossing marsh areas to the boundary between Quebec and Ontario
- 6.5 kilometres (4.0 mi) in Québec including 2.6 kilometres (1.6 mi) to the south-east in the swamp area, then 3.9 kilometres (2.4 mi) to the East, to a stream (coming from the South)
- 12.2 kilometres (7.6 mi) to Nord-East in swamp area, up to the mouth

The Garneau River flows to the southwest bank of the Turgeon River. This confluence is located at:

- 47.0 kilometres (29.2 mi) at southwest of the mouth of the Turgeon River (confluence with the Harricana River)
- 7.5 kilometres (4.7 mi) at east of the boundary between Quebec and Ontario
- 84.9 kilometres (52.8 mi) at west of the center of the village of Joutel, in Quebec
- 103 kilometres (64 mi) at north of the city center of La Sarre, in Quebec

== Toponymy ==
The term "Garneau" is a surname of a family of French origin.

The name "rivière Garneau" was officially registered on December 5, 1968, at the Commission de toponymie du Québec, at the creation of this commission.

== See also ==
- Cochrane District, an administrative district of Ontario
- Northeastern Ontario
- Eeyou Istchee Baie-James (municipality)
- Turgeon River, a watercourse
- Harricana River, a watercourse
- James Bay, a body of water
- List of rivers of Ontario
- List of rivers of Quebec
