= North Burntbush River =

North Burntbush
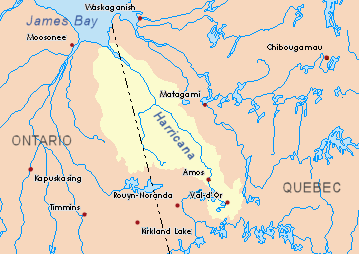
- Harricana River basin in yellow

Location
- Country: Canada
- Province: Ontario
- District: Cochrane

Physical characteristics
- Source
  - location: Cochrane District, Ontario
  - coordinates: 49°40′35″N 80°15′10″W
  - elevation: 305 m (1,001 ft)
- Mouth: Burntbush River
  - location: Cochrane District, Ontario
  - coordinates: 49°39′04″N 80°08′48″W
  - elevation: 297 m (974 ft)
- Length: 17.6 km (10.9 mi)

The Burntbush North River is a tributary of the Burntbush River, flowing into the Cochrane District, in Northeastern Ontario, in Canada.

Forestry is the main economic activity of the sector; recreational tourism activities, second.

The surface of the river is usually frozen from early November to mid-May, however, safe ice movement is generally from mid-November to the end of April.

== Geography ==
The hydrographic slopes adjacent to the "Burtbush North River" are:

- North side: Kesagami River, Burntbush Lake North, Lake George;
- East side: Burntbush River, Detour River, Case River;
- South side: Mikwam River, Burntbush River;
- West side: Burntbush River, Seguin River.

The "Burntbush North River" originates at the mouth of Lake George (length: 2.1 metres (6 ft 11 in); altitude: 305 metres (1,001 ft)). Its mouth is located at 1.2 kilometres (0.75 mi) east of Highway 652 (Ontario), at 8.2 kilometres (5.1 mi) west of the mouth of the Burntbush River North and to 56.5 kilometres (35.1 mi) northwest of the mouth of the Burntbush River (confluence with Turgeon River).

From the mouth of Lake George, the Burtbush North flows over 17.6 kilometres (10.9 mi) according to the following segments:

- 9.8 kilometres (6.1 mi) southeasterly, then northeasterly, through some wetlands, up to the south shore of North Burntbush Lake;
- 1.2 kilometres (0.75 mi) north across the southeastern portion of North Burntbush Lake to its mouth;
- 6.6 kilometres (4.1 mi) southeasterly to mouth.

The confluence of the Burtbush North River located at:

- 45.5 kilometres (28.3 mi) west of the border Ontario - Quebec;
- 56.5 kilometres (35.1 mi) south of a bay Kesagami Lake;
- 48.3 kilometres (30.0 mi) northwest of the mouth of the Burntbush River (confluence with the Turgeon River);
- 9.2 kilometres (5.7 mi) East of road 652 (Ontario).

== Toponymy ==
The names Upper Burntbush Lake, North Burntbush Lake, Burntbush Lake and Burntbush River are of the same origin.

== See also ==
- Burntbush River, a watercourse
- Turgeon River, a watercourse
- Harricana River, a watercourse
- James Bay
- Cochrane District (Ontario)
- Northeastern Ontario
- List of rivers of Ontario
