= Trudelle River =

Trudelle
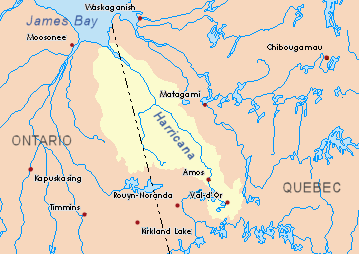
- Harricana River basin in yellow

Location
- Country: Canada
- Province: Quebec
- Region: Nord-du-Québec

Physical characteristics
- Source: Unidentified marsh
  - location: Authier-Nord, Quebec, Abitibi-Témiscamingue, Abitibi-Ouest, Quebec
  - coordinates: 48°58′43″N 78°51′36″W
  - elevation: 326 m (1,070 ft)
- Mouth: Perdrix River (Eeyou Istchee Baie-James)
  - location: Eeyou Istchee Baie-James (municipality), Nord-du-Québec, Quebec
  - coordinates: 49°06′34″N 78°52′59″W
  - elevation: 285 m (935 ft)
- Length: 20.7 km (12.9 mi)

The Trudelle River is a tributary of the Perdrix River (Eeyou Istchee Baie-James), flowing in Quebec, in Canada, in the administrative regions of:

- Abitibi-Témiscamingue: in the RCM Abitibi-Ouest through the municipalities of Authier-Nord, Quebec (township of Disson) and Chazel, Quebec (township of Chazel);
- Nord-du-Québec: Jamésie, crossing the southern part of Eeyou Istchee Baie-James (municipality).

Forestry is the main economic activity of the sector; recreational tourism activities, second. The area is served by some secondary forest roads.

The surface of the river is usually frozen from the end of November to the end of April, however safe ice circulation is generally from early December to mid-April.

== Geography ==
The hydrographic slopes near the Trudelle River are:

- North side: Perdrix River (Eeyou Istchee Baie-James), Wawagosic River, Turgeon River (Eeyou Istchee Baie-James);
- East side: Perdrix River (Eeyou Istchee Baie-James), Homie Creek, Kaomakomiskiwag Creek, Harricana River;
- South side: Kaomakomiskiwag Creek, Authier River, Macamic River;
- West side: Menard River, Deloge Creek, Boivin River.

The Trudelle River originates on the West side of a marsh (elevation: 326 metres (1,070 ft)) in the township of Disson, at:

- 7.8 kilometres (4.8 mi) east of Turgeon Lake (Eeyou Istchee James Bay);
- 24.6 kilometres (15.3 mi) southeast of the village center of Villebois, Quebec;
- 14.3 kilometres (8.9 mi) south of the mouth of the Trudelle River (confluence with the Perdrix River (Eeyou Istchee Baie-James);
- 48.2 kilometres (30.0 mi) east of the Ontario-Quebec border;
- 40.4 kilometres (25.1 mi) south of the mouth of Perdrix River (Eeyou Istchee Baie-James) (confluence with the Wawagosic River).

From its source in the township of Disson, the Trudelle River flows over 20.7 kilometres (12.9 mi) entirely in forest zone according to these segments:

- 0.8 kilometres (0.50 mi) northward in the township of Disson (municipality of Authier-Nord, Quebec), to the eastern limit of the township of Chazel;
- 4.5 kilometres (2.8 mi) northwesterly in Chazel Township (municipality of Chazel, Quebec) collecting a stream (coming from the Northeast), to the southern limit the canton of Lavergne;
- 15.4 kilometres (9.6 mi) to the North in the township of Lavergne (in Eeyou Istchee James Bay (municipality)) forming a curve towards the West and crossing the "Rapide Mo" at the end of segment, to its mouth.

The mouth of the "Trudelle River" which flows into a bend of the river on the west bank of the Perdrix River (Eeyou Istchee Baie-James) is located in the forest zone at:

- 1.5 kilometres (0.93 mi) west of a forest road (north–south direction);
- 26.3 kilometres (16.3 mi) south of the mouth of Perdrix River (Eeyou Istchee Baie-James) (confluence with the Wawagosic River);
- 96.5 kilometres (60.0 mi) southeast of the mouth of the Wawagosic River (confluence with Turgeon River (Eeyou Istchee Baie-James));
- 46.4 kilometres (28.8 mi) east of the Ontario-Quebec border;
- 57.4 kilometres (35.7 mi) south-west of the village center of Joutel, Quebec.

== Toponymy ==
The terms "Trudel" and "Trudelle" are French patronymic variations of the same root.

The toponym "Trudelle River" was formalized on December 5, 1968, at the Commission de toponymie du Québec, at the creation of this commission.

== See also ==
- James Bay
- List of rivers of Quebec
