= Lavergne River =

Lavergne
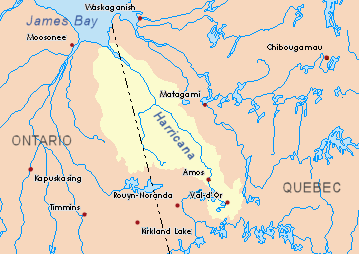
- Harricana River basin in yellow

Location
- Country: Canada
- Province: Quebec
- Region: Nord-du-Québec

Physical characteristics
- Source
  - location: Eeyou Istchee Baie-James (municipality), Quebec
  - coordinates: 48°57′21″N 79°04′05″W
  - elevation: 310 m (1,020 ft)
- Mouth: Turgeon River (Harricana River)
  - location: Eeyou Istchee Baie-James (municipality), Nord-du-Québec, Quebec
  - coordinates: 49°00′50″N 79°03′53″W
  - elevation: 259 m (850 ft)
- Length: 9.9 km (6.2 mi)

The Lavergne River is a tributary of Lake Turgeon, flowing into the Municipality of Eeyou Istchee Baie-James (municipality), in Nord-du-Québec, in Quebec, in Canada. The "Lavergne river" flows in the cantons of Chazel and Lavergne.

Forestry is the main economic activity of the sector; recreational tourism activities, second.

The surface of the river is usually frozen from the end of November to the end of April, however safe ice circulation is generally from early December to mid-April.

== Geography ==
The hydrographic slopes near the "Lavergne River" are:

- North side: Lake Turgeon, Turgeon River, Kodiga Creek;
- East side: Ojima River, Deception Creek;
- South side: La Sarre River, Macamic Lake;
- West side: Brodeur Creek, Turgeon River, Des Méloizes River.

The source of the "Lavergne River" is a forest stream (altitude: 310 metres (1,020 ft)) located at:

- 45.4 kilometres (28.2 mi) East of the border Ontario-Quebec;
- 6.5 kilometres (4.0 mi) South of the mouth of Lake Turgeon;
- 32.1 kilometres (19.9 mi) North of downtown La Sarre, Quebec.

From its source, the "Lavergne River" runs on 9.9 kilometres (6.2 mi) entirely in forest zone according to these segments:

- 8.7 kilometres (5.4 mi) northwards in the canton of Chazel, to the southern limit of the canton of Lavergne;
- 1.2 kilometres (0.75 mi) north-east of Lavergne Township to the mouth of the river.

The mouth of the "Lavergne River" flows to the south shore of Lake Turgeon. This mouth of the river is located in the forest zone at:

- 3.3 kilometres (2.1 mi) South of the mouth of Lake Turgeon;
- 39.7 kilometres (24.7 mi) East of the border Ontario - Quebec;
- 123.3 kilometres (76.6 mi) South-West of the mouth of the Turgeon River;
- 62.2 kilometres (38.6 mi) South-West of the village center of Joutel, Quebec.

== Toponymy ==
The term "Lavergne" refers to a family name of French origin.

The toponym "Lavergne River" was formalized on December 5, 1968, at the Commission de toponymie du Québec, at the creation of this commission.

== See also ==
- Harricana River, a watercourse
- James Bay
- Eeyou Istchee James Bay (municipality)
- List of rivers of Quebec
