= Mikwam River =

Mikwam
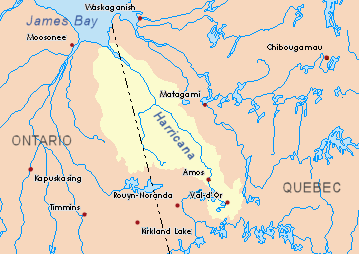
- Harricana River basin in yellow

Location
- Country: Canada
- Province: Ontario
- District: Cochrane

Physical characteristics
- Source
  - location: Cochrane District, Ontario
  - coordinates: 49°43′16″N 79°56′39″W
  - elevation: 343 m (1,125 ft)
- Mouth: Turgeon River
  - location: Cochrane District, Ontario
  - coordinates: 49°27′51″N 79°32′42″W
  - elevation: 271 m (889 ft)
- Length: 87.8 km (54.6 mi)

Basin features
- Tributaries
  - right: Turgeon River

The Mikwam River is a tributary of the Burntbush River, flowing in the Cochrane District in northeastern Ontario, in Canada.

Forestry is the main economic activity of the sector; recreational tourism activities, second. The west side of this slope is served by the Ontario road 652.

The surface of the river is usually frozen from early November to mid-May, but safe circulation on the ice generally occurs from mid-November to the end of April.

== Geography ==
The hydrographic slopes adjacent to the Mikwam River are:

- North side: Burntbush River, North Burntbush River, Lawagamau River;
- East side: Burntbush River, Turcotte River;
- South side: South Mikwam River, Little Mikwam River, Porphyry Creek, Kabika River (Ontario), East Kabika River, Seguin River;
- West side: South Floodwood River South, Floodwood River, Little Abitibi River.

The Mikwam river takes its source from a mountain stream (altitude: 343 metres (1,125 ft)).

From its source, the Mikwam River flows on 87.8 kilometres (54.6 mi) according to the following segments:

- 7.4 kilometres (4.6 mi) to the south boundary of the township of Newman, passing on the eastern side of a mountain whose summit reaches 391 metres (1,283 ft);
- 9.9 kilometres (6.2 mi) northeast by forming a S entering in Newman Township, to the confluence of the East Mikwam River;
- 5.0 kilometres (3.1 mi) to the north through marsh areas to the south shore of Snare Lake;
- 12.4 kilometres (7.7 mi) to the north, including 3.3 kilometres (2.1 mi) across Springer Lake to the southern boundary of Blakelock Township;
- 12.8 kilometres (8.0 mi) to the north, crossing Lake Magishan and 4.7 kilometres (2.9 mi) across Lake Mikwam to its mouth. Note: Lake Mikwam receives on the west side the discharge of Lake Brayley and on the east side, the Little Mikwam River;
- 18.0 kilometres (11.2 mi) northeast, then southeasterly when entering Hoblitzell Township, to Porphyry Creek (coming from the South).

The confluence of the Mikwam River is located in Hoblitzell Township, at 29.3 kilometres (18.2 mi) west of the Ontario - Quebec; to the west of the mouth of the Burntbush River; to the southeast of a bay south of Kesagami Lake and to the east of the Ontario road 652.

== Toponymy ==
The following place names are of the same origin and are in the same area of the Cochrane District: Mikwam River, Little Mikwam River, East Mikwam River, Mikwam Lake, Little Mikwam Lake and Upper Mikwam Lake.

== See also ==
- Northeastern Ontario
- Little Mikwam River, a watercourse
- East Mikwam River, a watercourse
- Burntbush River, a watercourse
- Turgeon River, a watercourse
- Harricana River, a watercourse
- James Bay
- Cochrane District (Ontario)
- List of rivers of Ontario
