= Lake Turgeon =

Lake in Quebec, Canada

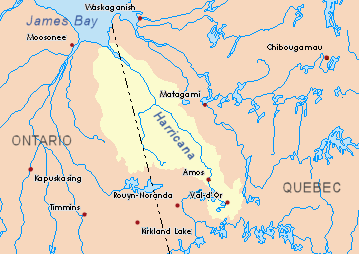
- Image of watershed of Harricana River

- Location within Quebec
- Location: Eeyou Istchee Baie-James (municipality)
- Coordinates: 49°01′27″N 79°01′15″W
- Lake type: Natural
- Primary inflows: Kadiga creek, Deception creek, Ojima River, Lavergne River
- Primary outflows: Turgeon River
- Basin countries: Canada
- Max. length: 9.2 km (9,200 m)
- Max. width: 4.7 km (4,700 m)
- Surface elevation: 288 m (945 ft)

Turgeon Lake is a freshwater body located in the Northwest province of Quebec, in Canada. This body of water straddles the municipalities of:

- Eeyou Istchee Baie-James (municipality) (township of Lavergne), in Jamésie, in the administrative region of Nord-du-Québec;
- Chazel, Quebec (township of Chazel) in the Regional County Municipality (RCM) of Abitibi-Ouest, in the administrative region of Abitibi-Témiscamingue.

The demarcation line of the two administrative regions of Quebec passes in the middle of southeastern part of Lake Turgeon.

Forestry is the main economic activity of the sector; recreational tourism activities, second.

This hydrographic slope is served on the west side by the Conquerors road (North-South direction) and a forest road "Chemin de la presqu’île" (East-West direction) serving a peninsula of the South shore. The resort has developed on the southern shore of the bay between the mouth of the Lavergne River and the peninsula advancing to the North.

Annually, the lake surface is generally frozen from mid-November to late April, however, the period of safe ice circulation is usually from mid-December to mid-April.

== Geography ==
The main hydrographic slopes near Turgeon Lake are:
- North side: Kodiga Creek (draining the southeast of the Fenouillet Mountains (summit elevation: 448 metres (1,470 ft)), Hal Creek;
- East side: Trudelle River, Perdrix River (Eeyou Istchee Baie-James), Davy River;
- South side: Deception Creek, Ojima River, Lavergne River;
- West side: Turgeon River, Morin Stream, Leslie Creek.

This body of water has the following bays:

- Nidokwagan Bay (South Shore) facing Kakinwanaga Island,
- Kinojeaminikami bay (northwest, near the mouth),
- Kohokoho Bay (north of the northwestern part of the lake),
- Nigigami Bay at the mouth of the Lavergne River.

The main islands are: Kaicpabikinaga Island, Saban Island, Kawigwasiginaga Island, Cagawapani Island and Ikodjic Island.

The Tagwagici Point, which projects towards the East, bounds the southern part of Kinojeamini Bay.

The mouth of Lake Turgeon is located at:

- 33.7 kilometres (20.9 mi) East of the Quebec - Ontario border;

South of the mouth of the Turgeon River;

- 66 kilometres (41 mi) East of the Harricana River;
- 23.8 kilometres (14.8 mi) Northwest of the mouth of Macamic Lake;
- 29.1 kilometres (18.1 mi) North of Saarland.
From the mouth of Turgeon Lake, the Turgeon River flows over 216.6 kilometres (134.6 mi) forming a large curve to the West, before spilling into the Harricana River. The latter flows northwesterly to Ontario where it empties onto the South shore of James Bay.

== Toponymy ==
In the past, this lake was designated "Nigigwadinibi Lake" by the Native Americans of the Algonquin Nation, meaning "lake with cold crystallized waters". The names of the bays and islands are all of Algonquin origin.

The toponym "Lac Turgeon" was made official on December 5, 1968 by the Commission de toponymie du Québec, when it was created.

== See also ==
- Lavergne River, a watercourse
- Ojima River, a watercourse
- Turgeon River, a watercourse
- Harricana River, a watercourse
- James Bay, a body of water
- Abitibi, a regional county municipality (MRC)
- Eeyou Istchee Baie-James (municipality), a municipality
- Chazel, Quebec, a municipality
- List of lakes in Canada
