= Enjalran River =

Enjalran Old name: "Hundredmile River"
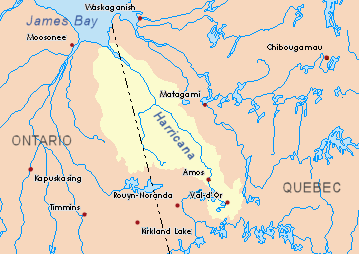
- Harricana River basin in yellow

Location
- Country: Canada
- Province: Quebec
- Region: Nord-du-Québec

Physical characteristics
- Source: Lake Enjalran
  - location: Eeyou Istchee Baie-James (municipality), Nord-du-Québec, Quebec
  - coordinates: 48°54′20″N 78°57′24″W
  - elevation: 253 m (830 ft)
- Mouth: Turgeon River (Harricana River)
  - location: Eeyou Istchee Baie-James (municipality), Nord-du-Québec, Quebec
  - coordinates: 49°50′28″N 79°24′33″W
  - elevation: 246 m (807 ft)
- Length: 10.6 km (6.6 mi)

Basin features
- Tributaries
  - left: Makwo creek
  - right: (from the mouth) Discharge of lake Henri, discharge of lake Chicoyne, discharge of lake Jamet (via lake Enjalran).

The Enjalran River is a tributary of the Turgeon River, flowing into the township of Enjalran in the municipality of Eeyou Istchee Baie-James (municipality), in the administrative region from Nord-du-Québec, Quebec, Canada.

Forestry is the main economic activity of the sector; recreational tourism activities, second.

The surface of the river is usually frozen from the end of November to the end of April, however safe ice circulation is generally from early December to mid-April.

== Geography ==
The surrounding hydrographic slopes of the Enjalran River are:

- North side: Turgeon River (Harricana River), Quésagami Creek;
- East side: Santoire Creek, Théo River;
- South side: Enjalran Lake, Turgeon River (Harricana River), Makwo Creek;
- West side: Turgeon River (Harricana River), Kaokonimawaga Creek.

The Enjalran River rises at the mouth of lake Enjalran (length: 3.0 kilometres (1.9 mi), elevation: 253 metres (830 ft)) in Enjalran Township located at:

- 2.7 kilometres (1.7 mi) West of Enjalran Hills (summit elevation: 319 metres (1,047 ft));
- 10.8 kilometres (6.7 mi) East of the border Ontario - Quebec;
- 7.4 kilometres (4.6 mi) south of the mouth of the Enjalran River;
- 109.6 kilometres (68.1 mi) north-east of downtown La Sarre.

From its source, the "Enjalran River" flows over 10.6 kilometres (6.6 mi) entirely in forest zone according to these segments:

- 6.4 kilometres (4.0 mi) Northward, to the outlet of Lac Chicoyne (coming from the East);
- 1.5 kilometres (0.93 mi) Northward, to the outlet of Lake Henri (coming from North-East);
- 2.7 kilometres (1.7 mi) Northward to the mouth of the river.

The mouth of the "Enjalran River" that flows to the east bank of the Turgeon River is located in the forest zone at:

- 12.4 kilometres (7.7 mi) upstream of the mouth of the Detour River;
- 8.3 kilometres (5.2 mi) East of the border Ontario - Quebec;
- 38.4 kilometres (23.9 mi) South-East of the mouth of the Turgeon River;
- 116.8 kilometres (72.6 mi) North of La Sarre, Quebec city center.

== Toponymy ==
The term "Enjalran" refers to a family name of French origin. The term "Enjalran" is used in the following place-names located in the same area in the Nord-West of Quebec province: Enjalran Township, Enjalran Hills, Enjalran River and Enjalran Lake.

The toponym "Enjalran River" was formalized on December 5, 1968, at the Commission de toponymie du Québec, at the creation of this commission.

== See also ==
- Harricana River, a watercourse
- James Bay
- Jamésie
- Eeyou Istchee Baie-James (municipality), a municipality
- List of rivers of Quebec
