= Little Mikwam River =

Little Mikwam
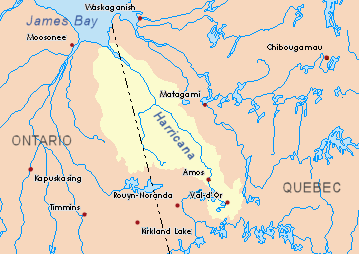
- Harricana River basin in yellow

Location
- Country: Canada
- Province: Ontario
- District: Cochrane

Physical characteristics
- Source
  - location: Cochrane District, Ontario
  - coordinates: 49°29′41″N 80°06′26″W
  - elevation: 309 m (1,014 ft)
- Mouth: Mikwam River
  - location: Cochrane District, Ontario
  - coordinates: 49°31′01″N 79°09′25″W
  - elevation: 293 m (961 ft)
- Length: 11.3 km (7.0 mi)

The Little Mikwam River is a tributary of the Mikwam River (via Mikwam Lake), flowing into the Cochrane District, Northeastern Ontario, in Canada.

Forestry is the main economic activity of the sector; recreational tourism activities, second. The west side of this slope is served by the Ontario Highway 652.

The surface of the river is usually frozen from early November to mid-May, but safe circulation on the ice generally occurs from mid-November to the end of April.

== Geography ==
The neighboring hydrographic slopes of the" Little Mikwam River" are:

- North side: Mikwam River, Burntbush River;
- East side: Porphyry Creek, Mikwam River, Burntbush River;
- South side: Porphyry Creek, East Mikwam River;
- West side: Mikwam River, Tweed River, Floodwood River.

The "Little Mikwam River" originates at the mouth of a small forest lake (altitude: 309 metres (1,014 ft)). From its source, the "Little Mikwam river" flows on 11.3 kilometres (7.0 mi) according to the following segments:

- 5.6 kilometres (3.5 mi) in Blakelock Township to the south-east, then forks north-westerly to the south shore of "Little Lake Mikwam";
- 4.0 kilometres (2.5 mi) westward through the "Little Lake Mikwam" (length: 4.4 kilometres (2.7 mi); altitude: 298 metres (978 ft));
- 1.7 kilometres (1.1 mi) to South-West, up to the mouth.

The confluence of the "Little Mikwam River" is located in Blakelock Township, at 46.2 kilometres (28.7 mi) west of the Ontario - Quebec border; 17.6 kilometres (10.9 mi) southwest of the mouth of the Mikwam River; 44.7 kilometres (27.8 mi) west of the mouth of the Burntbush River; 71 kilometres (44 mi) south of a bay south of Kesagami Lake and 9.1 kilometres (5.7 mi) to the southeast of the Ontario Highway 652.

== Toponymy ==
The following names are of the same origin and are in the same area of the Cochrane District: Mikwam River, Little Wikwam River, East Mikwam River, Mikwam Lake, Mikwam Lake, Mikwam Lake superior.

== See also ==
- Mikwam River, a river
- Burntbush River, a watercourse
- Turgeon River, a stream
- Harricana River, a watercourse
- James Bay
- Cochrane District (Ontario)
- Northeastern Ontario
- List of rivers of Ontario
