= Turcotte River =

Turcotte
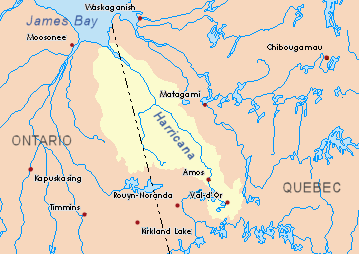
- Harricana River basin in yellow

Location
- Country: Canada
- Provinces: Ontario; Quebec

Physical characteristics
- Source: Upper Turcotte Lake
  - location: Cochrane District, Ontario
  - coordinates: 49°41′55″N 79°48′01″W
  - elevation: 311 m (1,020 ft)
- Mouth: Turgeon River
  - location: Eeyou Istchee Baie-James, Nord-du-Québec, Quebec
  - coordinates: 49°30′54″N 79°30′09″W
  - elevation: 259 m (850 ft)
- Length: 51.1 km (31.8 mi)

The Turcotte River is a tributary of the Turgeon River flowing in Canada in:

- Cochrane District, Northeastern Ontario;
- Eeyou Istchee Baie-James (municipality), in the Township of Dieppe.

The surface of the river is usually frozen from early November to mid-May, but safe circulation on the ice generally occurs from mid-November to the end of April.

== Geography ==
The main hydrographic slopes adjacent to the Turcotte River are:

- North side: Little Turcotte River, Detour River;
- East side: Turgeon River, Garneau River;
- South side: Burntbush River, Kabika River;
- West side: Chabie River, Burntbush River.

The Turcotte River originates at the mouth of Upper Turcotte Lake (length: 1.1 kilometres (0.68 mi); altitude: 311 metres (1,020 ft)) in the eastern part of the Cochrane District, in Ontario.

The mouth of Upper Turcotte Lake is located at:

- 20.4 kilometres (12.7 mi) at west of the boundary between Ontario and Quebec;
- 28.1 kilometres (17.5 mi) at northwest of the mouth of the Turcotte River (confluence with the Turgeon River);
- 55.7 kilometres (34.6 mi) at southwest of the mouth of the Turgeon River (in Quebec);
- 67.4 kilometres (41.9 mi) at southeast of a southern bay of Kesagami Lake in Ontario.

From the mouth of the Upper Turcotte Lake, the Turcotte River runs on 51.1 kilometres (31.8 mi) in the following segments:

- 1.6 kilometres (0.99 mi) southeast to a stream (coming from the north);
- 9.8 kilometres (6.1 mi) southwest to the western discharge of two unidentified lakes;
- 2.8 kilometres (1.7 mi) to the south-east by crossing marsh areas to the outlet of Lake Walford (coming from the Northeast);
- 6.5 kilometres (4.0 mi) southeast to the confluence of the Little Turcotte River (coming from the northwest);
- 2.9 kilometres (1.8 mi) southeasterly to the mouth of Lake Sigal (length: 1.1 kilometres (0.68 mi); altitude: 273 metres (896 ft)) the current crosses eastward on 0.2 kilometres (0.12 mi) the northern part;
- 9.5 kilometres (5.9 mi) northeast by collecting a creek (from the north), then the east, to a stream (coming from the northwest);
- 5.6 kilometres (3.5 mi) at southward by winding to the northern limit of the Township of Bradette;
- 1.9 kilometres (1.2 mi) southward in the Township of Bradette, to the discharge (coming from the northwest) of Lake Poulos;
- 2.3 kilometres (1.4 mi) at south to the boundary between Ontario and Quebec.

The Turcotte River flows to the northwest bank of the Turgeon River. This confluence is located at: southwest of the mouth of the Turgeon River (confluence with the Harricana River);

- 1.0 kilometre (0.62 mi) at east of the boundary between Quebec and Ontario;
- 87.1 kilometres (54.1 mi) at west of the center of the village of Joutel, Quebec, in Quebec;
- 82.3 kilometres (51.1 mi) at north of downtown La Sarre, Quebec, in Quebec.

== Toponymy ==
The term "Turcotte" is a surname of family of French origin.

The name "Rivière Turcotte" was officialized on December 5, 1968, at the Commission de toponymie du Québec, or at the creation of this commission.

== See also ==
- Cochrane District, an administrative district of Ontario
- Northeastern Ontario
- Eeyou Istchee Baie-James (municipality)
- Little Turcotte River, a stream
- Turgeon River, a stream
- Harricana River, a watercourse
- James Bay, a body of water
- List of rivers of Ontario
- List of rivers of Quebec
