= East Kabika River =

East Kabika
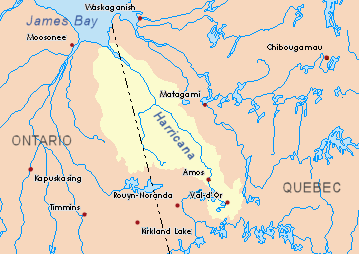
- Harricana River basin in yellow

Location
- Country: Canada
- Province: Ontario
- District: Cochrane

Physical characteristics
- Source
  - location: Cochrane District, Ontario
  - coordinates: 49°01′22″N 79°52′10″W
  - elevation: 312 m (1,024 ft)
- Mouth: Burntbush River
  - location: Cochrane District, Ontario
  - coordinates: 49°23′49″N 79°49′42″W
  - elevation: 259 m (850 ft)
- Length: 53.0 km (32.9 mi)

The East Kabika River is a tributary of the Kabika River, flowing into the Cochrane District in Northeastern Ontario, in Canada. The course of this river runs through the townships of Abbotsford, Singer and Hurtubise.

Forestry is the main economic activity of the sector; recreational tourism activities, second. The west side of this slope is served by the Ontario Highway 652.

The surface of the river is usually frozen from early November to mid-May, but safe circulation on the ice generally occurs from mid-November to the end of April.

== Geography ==
The adjacent hydrographic slopes of the East Kabika River are:

- North side: Kabika River, Burntbush River;
- East side: Patten River, Turgeon River;
- South side: Abitibi Lake, Patten River, La Reine River (Abitibi Lake);
- West side: Kabika River, Case River, Kenning River.

The East Kabika River originates at the mouth of a small forest lake (elevation: 312 metres (1,024 ft)) in township of Abbotsford. Its mouth is located 20.7 kilometres (12.9 mi) north of the North East Bay of Abitibi Lake.

From the mouth of the small head lake, the East Kabika River flows over 53.0 kilometres (32.9 mi) according to the following segments:

- 10.4 kilometres (6.5 mi) northerly in Abbotsford Township to Abbotsford Creek (coming from the West);
- 2.8 kilometres (1.7 mi) northerly forming a hook to the east to the boundary of Singer Township;
- 24.0 kilometres (14.9 mi) northerly winding through Singer Township to the edge of Hurtubise Township;
- 15.8 kilometres (9.8 mi) north winding through Hurtubise Township to its mouth.

The confluence of Kabika River East in Hurtubise Township, at 22.6 kilometres (14.0 mi) west of the boundary Ontario - Quebec; 3.9 kilometres (2.4 mi) southwest of the mouth of the Kabika River; 22.2 kilometres (13.8 mi) west of the mouth of the Burntbush River (confluence with the Turgeon River); 93.6 kilometres (58.2 mi) Southwest of the mouth of the Turgeon River (confluence with the Harricana River); to 87.4 kilometres (54.3 mi) south-east of a bay south of Kesagami Lake and 35.8 kilometres (22.2 mi) east of Ontario Highway 652.

== Toponymy ==
The following names are of the same origin and are in the same area of Cochrane District: Kabika River, Kakiba River East. The term "Kabika" is an African name.

== See also ==
- Kabika River, a watercourse
- Burntbush River, a watercourse
- Turgeon River, a stream
- Harricana River, a watercourse
- James Bay
- Cochrane District (Ontario)
- Northeastern Ontario
- List of rivers of Ontario
