= Case River =

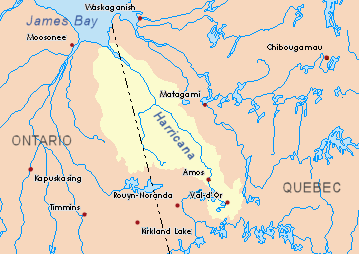
- Harricana River basin in yellow

Location
- Country: Canada
- Province: Ontario
- District: Cochrane

Physical characteristics
- Source
  - location: Cochrane District, Ontario
  - coordinates: 49°01′00″N 79°55′37″W
  - elevation: 348 m (1,142 ft)
- Mouth: Kabika River
  - location: Cochrane District, Ontario
  - coordinates: 49°17′26″N 79°52′56″W
  - elevation: 259 m (850 ft)
- Length: 51.6 km (32.1 mi)

The Case River is a tributary of the Kabika River, flowing in Cochrane District in Northeastern Ontario, in Canada. The course of this river runs through the townships of Steele, Case and Kenning.

Forestry is the main economic activity of the sector; recreational tourism activities, second. The west side of this slope is served by the Ontario road 652.

The surface of the river is usually frozen from early November to mid-May, but safe circulation on the ice generally occurs from mid-November to the end of April.

== Geography ==
The surrounding hydrographic slopes of the Case River are:

- North side: Kabika River, Burntbush River;
- Nast side: Kabika River, East Kabika River, Patten River, Turgeon River;
- South side: Mace Creek, Abitibi Lake, Little Kaminisinakwa River;
- West side: Little Joe Creek, Kenning River, Séguin River.

The Case River originates at the mouth of Wheat Lake (elevation: 348 metres (1,142 ft)) in northern Steele Township. This lake is located southeast of a mountain with a peak of 432 metres (1,417 ft) and a guard tower. Its mouth is located at 6.6 kilometres (4.1 mi) north of the North-East Bay of Abitibi Lake.

From the mouth of Wheat Lake, the Case River flows over 51.6 kilometres (32.1 mi) according to the following segments:

- 6.8 kilometres (4.2 mi) northwesterly in Steele Township, to the east of Case Township;
- 23.1 kilometres (14.4 mi) north in Case Township, to Kenning's Anton Line;
- 2.6 kilometres (1.6 mi) northwesterly in Kenning Township, to the influence of the Kenning River (coming from the west);
- 19.4 kilometres (12.1 mi) north, then north-east, winding through township Hurtubise to its mouth.

The confluence of the Case River in Hurtubise Township, at 16.3 kilometres (10.1 mi) west of the Ontario border Quebec; 16.3 kilometres (10.1 mi) south-west of the mouth of the Kabika River (confluence with the Burntbush River); 31.3 kilometres (19.4 mi) southwesterly of the mouth of Burntbush River (confluence with Turgeon River); 105.3 kilometres (65.4 mi) south of the mouth of the Turgeon River (confluence with the Harricana River); 7.5 kilometres (4.7 mi) North-West of a bay south of Kesagami Lake and 43.4 kilometres (27.0 mi) east of Ontario Highway 652.

== Toponymy ==
The term "Case" is a family name of English origin.

== See also ==
- Kenning River, a watercourse
- Kabika River, a watercourse
- Burntbush River, a watercourse
- Turgeon River, a stream
- Harricana River, a watercourse
- James Bay
- Cochrane District (Ontario)
- Northeastern Ontario
- List of rivers of Ontario
