= Val-Saint-Gilles =

- Municipality
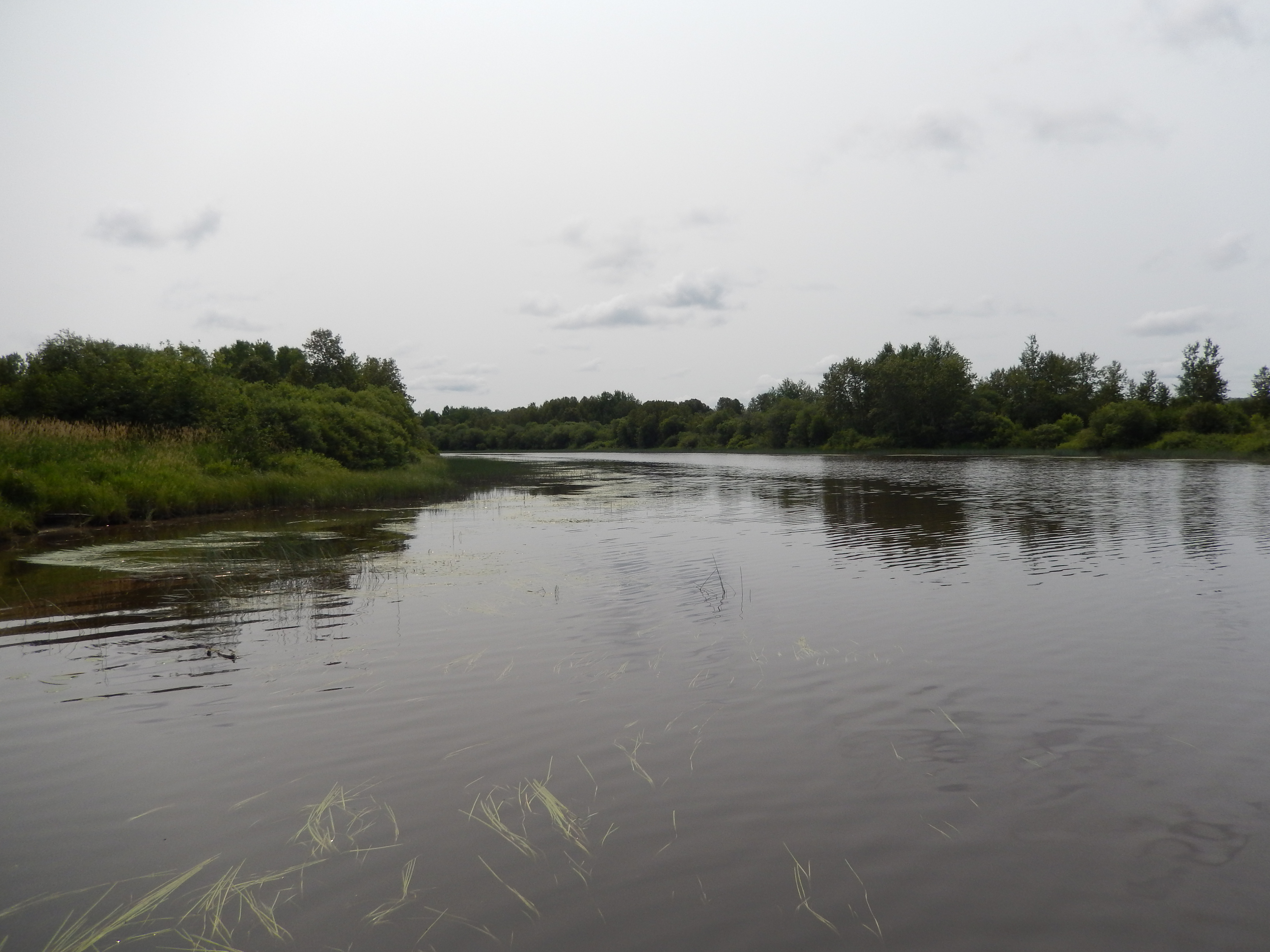

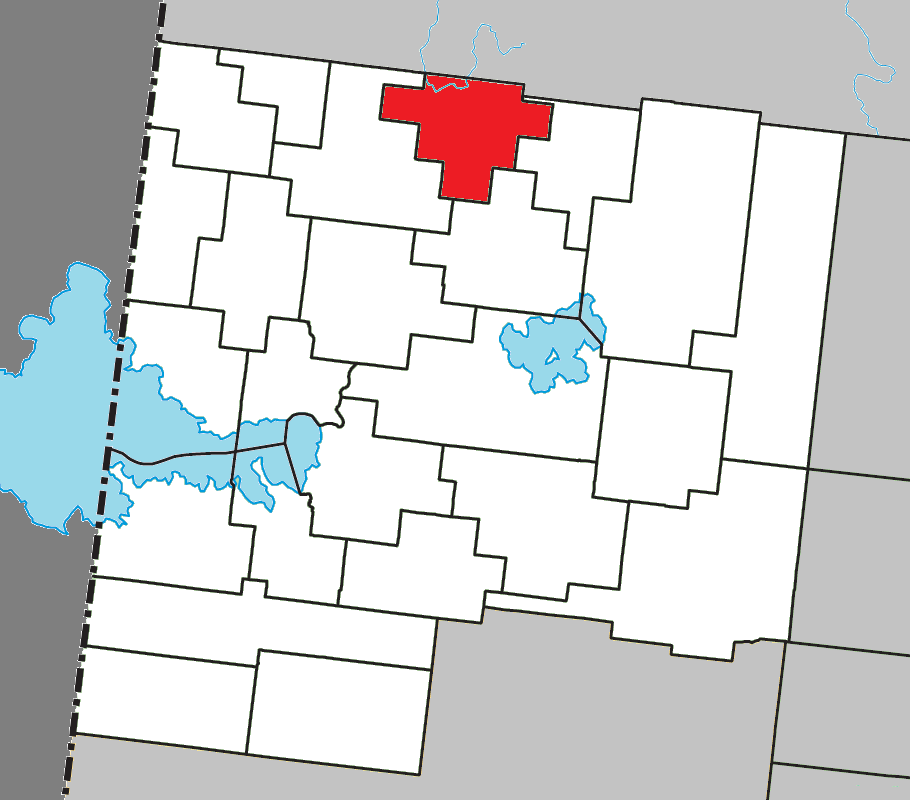
- Location within Abitibi-Ouest RCM

- Location in western Quebec
- Coordinates: 48°58′N 79°07′W
- Country: Canada
- Province: Quebec
- Region: Abitibi-Témiscamingue
- RCM: Abitibi-Ouest
- Settled: c. 1935
- Constituted: April 1, 1939

Government
  - Mayor: Alain Guillemette
  - Federal riding: Abitibi—Témiscamingue
  - Prov. riding: Abitibi-Ouest

Area
  - Total: 109.42 km^{2} (42.25 sq mi)
  - Land: 109.39 km^{2} (42.24 sq mi)
- Elevation: 345 m (1,132 ft)

Population (2021)
  - Total: 169
  - Density: 1.5/km^{2} (3.9/sq mi)
  - Pop (2016-21): ▲7.6%
  - Dwellings: 79
- Time zone: UTC−5 (EST)
  - Summer (DST): UTC−4 (EDT)
- Postal code(s): J0Z 3T0
- Area code: 819
- Highways: R-393
- Website: valst-gilles.ao.ca

Val-Saint-Gilles (French pronunciation: [val sɛ̃ ʒil]) is a municipality in northwestern Quebec, Canada, in the Abitibi-Ouest Regional County Municipality about 24 kilometres (15 mi) north of La Sarre. It covers 109.39 km² and with a population of 169 in the 2021 Canadian census, it is the least populous incorporated municipality in the regional county.

It lies at the northern edge of the Abitibi Clay Belt. The undulating land is dotted with swamps, a few small lakes, and sand and gravel deposits. Its high point is marked by two hills near the village with an altitude of 345 metres (1,132 ft). The Turgeon River, the only notable river and tributary of the Harricana River, flows through the north-western part of the municipality.

== History ==
The first settlers, arriving circa 1935 as part of the Vautrin Settlement Plan, came from Clermont, Montreal, and Mont-Laurier. In 1937, they founded the Saint-Gilles-de-Clermont Parish, and two years later, the place separated from Clermont Township and was incorporated as the Municipality of Val-Saint-Gilles, named after Saint Giles.

But because of the harsh land, the settlers could barely make a living and many soon left, reducing the population from over 600 persons to less than 200 today. Its residents mostly commute to La Sarre and the surrounding area, working particularly in the mining and forestry sectors.

== Demographics ==
=== Population ===
Canada census – Val-Saint-Gilles community profile

	2021	2016	2011
Population	169 (+7.6% from 2016)	157 (-11.8% from 2011)	178 (+4.1% from 2006)
Land area	109.39 km^{2} (42.24 sq mi)	109.74 km^{2} (42.37 sq mi)	110.52 km^{2} (42.67 sq mi)
Population density	1.5/km^{2} (3.9/sq mi)	1.4/km^{2} (3.6/sq mi)	1.6/km^{2} (4.1/sq mi)
Median age	46.0 (M: 47.6, F: 44.8)	51.1 (M: 51.5, F: 50.2)	46.0 (M: 43.5, F: 47.2)
Private dwellings	79 (total)	81 (total)	79 (total)
Median household income	$.N/A	$.N/A	$.N/A

Notes: Income data for this area has been suppressed for data quality or confidentiality reasons.
References: 2021 2016 2011

Historical census populations – Val-Saint-Gilles, Quebec

Year	Pop.	±%
1941	511	—
1951	675	+32.1%
1956	579	−14.2%
1961	489	−15.5%
1966	483	−1.2%
1971	340	−29.6%

Year	Pop.	±%
1976	272	−20.0%
1981	221	−18.8%
1986	208	−5.9%
1991	207	−0.5%
1996	187	−9.7%
2001	169	−9.6%

Year	Pop.	±%
2006	171	+1.2%
2011	178	+4.1%
2016	157	−11.8%
2021	169	+7.6%

Source: Statistics Canada

=== Language ===
Canada Census Mother Tongue - Val-Saint-Gilles, Quebec
Census	Total	French			English			French & English			Other		
Year	Responses	Count	Trend	Pop %	Count	Trend	Pop %	Count	Trend	Pop %	Count	Trend	Pop %
2016	155	160	▼11.1%	100.0%	0	0.0%	0.0%	0	0.0%	0.0%	0	▼100.0%	0.0%
2011	185	180	▲5.9%	97.3%	0	0.0%	0.0%	0	0.0%	0.0%	5	▲ n/a%	2.7%
2006	170	170	▼10.5%	100.0%	0	0.0%	0.0%	0	0.0%	0.0%	0	0.0%	0.0%
2001	190	190	▼9.5%	100.0%	0	0.0%	0.0%	0	0.0%	0.0%	0	0.0%	0.0%
1996	210	210	n/a	100.0%	0	n/a	0.0%	0	n/a	0.0%	0	n/a	0.0%

== Government ==
Municipal council (as of 2023):

- Mayor: Alain Guillemette
- Councillors: Nancy Filiatrault, Réjean Dicaire, Chloé Roux, Roger Paul, Jean-Marie Lavoie, Marianne Bergeron

List of former mayors:

- Marc Quirion (...–2005)
- Benoît Sarrazin (2005–2009)
- Réjean Lambert (2009–2021)
- Alain Guillemette (2021–present)

== See also ==
- List of municipalities in Quebec
