= Kadabakato River =

Kadabakato
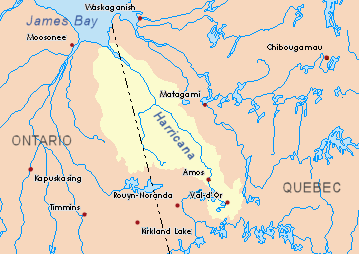
- Harricana River basin in yellow

Location
- Country: Canada
- Province: Quebec
- Region: Nord-du-Québec

Physical characteristics
- Source: Unidentified lake
  - location: Eeyou Istchee Baie-James (municipality), Nord-du-Québec, Quebec
  - coordinates: 49°27′29″N 78°47′59″W
  - elevation: 289 m (948 ft)
- Mouth: Wawagosic River
  - location: Eeyou Istchee Baie-James (municipality), Nord-du-Québec, Quebec
  - coordinates: 49°34′09″N 78°58′44″W
  - elevation: 252 m (827 ft)
- Length: 27.9 km (17.3 mi)

Basin features
- Tributaries
  - left: (from the mouth) Discharge of lake Fauvreau, discharge of lake Brignaud.

The Kadabakato River is a tributary of the Wawagosic River, flowing into the Municipality of Eeyou Istchee James Bay (municipality), in the Nord-du-Quebec, in Quebec, in Canada. The course of the Kadabakato river crosses to the northwest the township of Estrées.

Forestry is the main economic activity of the sector; recreational tourism activities, second. The area is served by some secondary forest roads.

The surface of the river is usually frozen from the end of November to the end of April, however safe ice circulation is generally from early December to mid-April.

== Geography ==
The surrounding hydrographic slopes of the Kadabakato River are:

- North side: Wawagosic River, Turgeon River (Eeyou Istchee Baie-James), Mistaouac River;
- East side: Nekwackak Creek, Newiska Lake, Plamondon River;
- South side: Brigaud Lake, Bruneau Creek, Wawagosic River;
- West side: Wawagosic River, Obakamigacici Creek.

The Kadabakato River originates from a forest stream (elevation: 279 metres (915 ft)) in the canton of estrées, namely:

- 36.0 kilometres (22.4 mi) Southwest of the village center of Joutel;
- 17.9 kilometres (11.1 mi) Southeast of the mouth of the Kadabakato River (confluence with the Wawagosic River);
- 52.0 kilometres (32.3 mi) East of the border Ontario - Quebec;
- 60.3 kilometres (37.5 mi) Southeast of the mouth of the Wawagosic River (confluence with Turgeon River (Eeyou Istchee Baie-James)).

From its source, the "Kadabakato River" flows over 27.9 kilometres (17.3 mi) entirely in forest zone according to these segments:

- 5.1 kilometres (3.2 mi) northwesterly in L'Estrées township, to a creek (from the Southwest);
- 4.4 kilometres (2.7 mi) northwesterly to the outlet of Lac Brignaud;
- 10.9 kilometres (6.8 mi) northwesterly, winding up to a creek (coming from the North);
- 4.4 kilometres (2.7 mi) Southwesterly winding to the outlet of Lake Favreau (coming from the South);
- 3.1 kilometres (1.9 mi) northwesterly to mouth.

The mouth of the "Kadabakato River" which flows to the southwest shore of the Wawagosic River is located in the forest zone at:

- 44.7 kilometres (27.8 mi) South-East of the mouth of the Wawagosic River (confluence with Turgeon River (Eeyou Istchee James Bay));
- 39.1 kilometres (24.3 mi) East of the Ontario - Quebec border;
- 49.0 kilometres (30.4 mi) South of the mouth of the Turgeon River (Eeyou Istchee James Bay) (confluence with the Harricana River);
- 50.2 kilometres (31.2 mi) West of the village center of Joutel, Quebec.

== Toponymy ==
The term "Kadabakato" is of Amerindian origin of the Algonquin Nation, meaning "we hear the sound of beavers striking with their tails".

The toponym "Kadabakato River" was formalized on October 5, 1982 at the Commission de toponymie du Québec, at the creation of this commission.

== See also ==
- Wawagosic River, a watercourse
- Turgeon River (Eeyou Istchee James Bay), a watercourse
- Harricana River, a watercourse
- James Bay
- Jamésie
- Eeyou Istchee Baie-James (municipality), a municipality
- List of rivers of Quebec
