= Mistaouac River =

Mistaouac
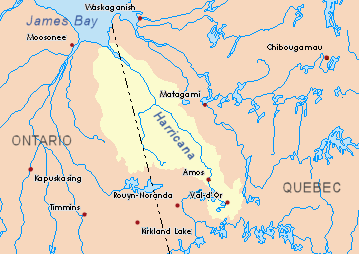
- Harricana River basin in yellow

Location
- Country: Canada
- Province: Quebec
- Region: Nord-du-Québec

Physical characteristics
- Source: Lake Villaret
  - location: Eeyou Istchee Baie-James (municipality), Nord-du-Québec, Quebec
  - coordinates: 49°35′40″N 78°43′35″W
  - elevation: 290 m (950 ft)
- Mouth: Wawagosic River
  - location: Eeyou Istchee Baie-James (municipality), Nord-du-Québec, Quebec
  - coordinates: 49°44′00″N 78°56′21″W
  - elevation: 250 m (820 ft)
- Length: 36.9 km (22.9 mi)

The Mistaouac River is a tributary of the Wawagosic River, flowing into the municipality of Eeyou Istchee Baie-James (municipality), in the administrative region of Nord-du-Québec, in Quebec, in Canada. The course of the river Mistaouac successively crosses the townships of Estrades, Orvilliers, Puiseaux and Brouillan.

Forestry is the main economic activity of the sector; recreational tourism activities, second. The area is served by some secondary forest roads.

The surface of the river is usually frozen from the end of November to the end of April, however safe ice circulation is generally from early December to mid-April.

== Geography ==
The hydrographic slopes near the Mistaouac River are:

- North side: Wawagosic River, Turgeon River (Eeyou Istchee Baie-James);
- East side: Plamondon River, Angle River, Harricana River;
- South side: Newiska Lake, Kadabakato River, Wawagosic River;
- West side: Wawagosic River.

The Mistaouac River has its source at the mouth of Lake Villaret (length: 3.9 kilometres (2.4 mi) altitude: 290 metres (950 ft)) in the canton of Orvilliers which is surrounded by several zones marsh. This lake is located at:

- 16.1 kilometres (10.0 mi) east of the Wawagosic River;
- 55.2 kilometres (34.3 mi) East of the border Ontario - Quebec;
- 22.1 kilometres (13.7 mi) south of the mouth of the Mistaouac River (confluence with the Wawagosic River);
- 49.0 kilometres (30.4 mi) south-east of the mouth of the Wawagosic River (confluence with the Turgeon River (Eeyou Istchee Baie-James)).

From its source, the "Mistaouac river" flows over 36.9 kilometres (22.9 mi) entirely in forest zone according to these segments:

- 1.4 kilometres (0.87 mi) towards the South-West in the canton of Orvilliers, to the limit of the canton of Estrades;
- 4.0 kilometres (2.5 mi) southwesterly to Nekwackak Creek (southeastern);
- 3.3 kilometres (2.1 mi) to the Northwest, to the limit of the township of Orvilliers;
- 13.1 kilometres (8.1 mi) northwesterly in the township of Orvilliers, to the limit of the township of Puisseaux;
- 5.9 kilometres (3.7 mi) North-West in the township of Puisseaux crossing the Esker-Mistaouac biodiversity reserve, to a creek (coming towards the South);
- 9.2 kilometres (5.7 mi) to the Northwest by entering the canton of Brouillan at the end of the segment, to its mouth. The mouth of the river is referred to as the "Nekuwacka confluence" in Algonquin language.

The mouth of the "Mistaouac River" which flows on the East bank of the Wawagosic River is located in the forest zone at:

- 27.9 kilometres (17.3 mi) South-East of the mouth of the Wawagosic River (confluence with the Turgeon River (Eeyou Istchee Baie-James));
- 59.6 kilometres (37.0 mi) East of the Ontario - Quebec border;
- 36.0 kilometres (22.4 mi) South-East of the mouth of the Turgeon River (Eeyou Istchee Baie-James) (confluence with the Harricana River);
- 41.1 kilometres (25.5 mi) north-west of the village center of Joutel.

== Toponymy ==
The mouth of the river is called Nekuwacka confluence in the Algonquin language.

The toponym "rivière Mistaouac" was formalized on December 5, 1968, at the Commission de toponymie du Québec, at the creation of this commission.

== See also ==
- Wawagosic River, a watercourse
- Turgeon River (Eeyou Istchee Baie-James), a watercourse
- Harricana River, a watercourse
- James Bay
- Jamésie
- Eeyou Istchee Baie-James (municipality), a municipality
- Esker-Mistaouac biodiversity reserve
- List of rivers of Quebec
