= Ojima (surname) =

Ojima (written: 小島 or 小嶋 lit. "small island") is a Japanese surname. Notable people with the surname include:

- Susumu Ojima (小嶋 進, born 1953), Japanese entrepreneur who was a founder and chairman of Huser Co., Ltd
