= Rivière-Ojima =

- Unorganized territory
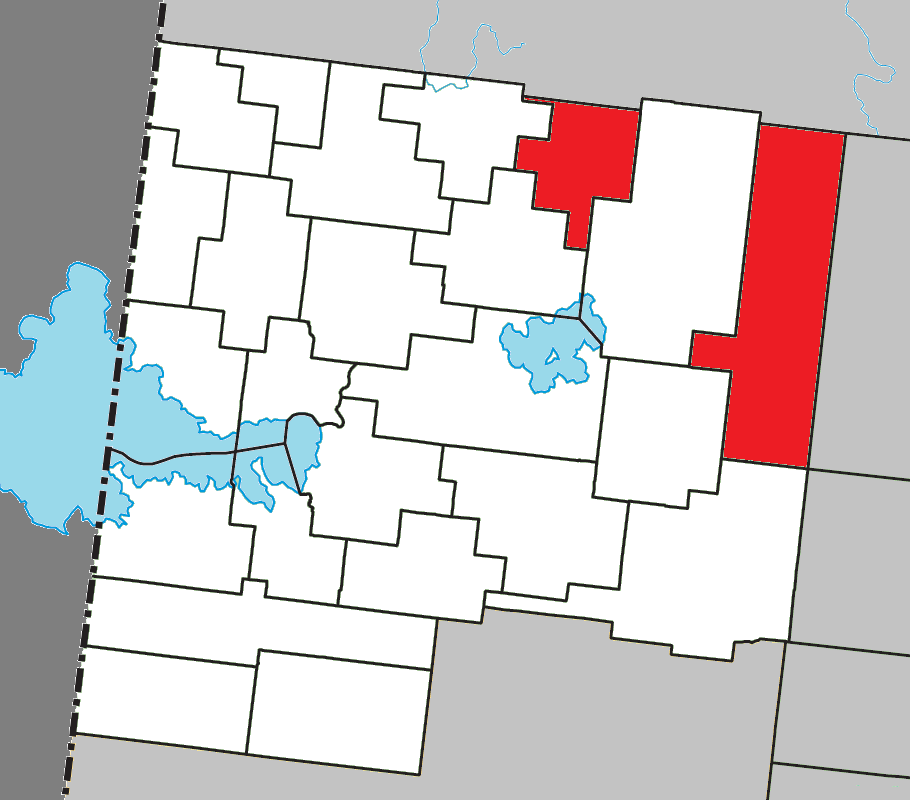
- Location within Abitibi-Ouest RCM

- Location in western Quebec
- Coordinates: 48°50′N 78°42′W
- Country: Canada
- Province: Quebec
- Region: Abitibi-Témiscamingue
- RCM: Abitibi-Ouest
- Constituted: January 1, 1986

Government
  - Federal riding: Abitibi—Témiscamingue
  - Prov. riding: Abitibi-Ouest

Area
  - Total: 359.59 km^{2} (138.84 sq mi)
  - Land: 354.47 km^{2} (136.86 sq mi)

Population (2021)
  - Total: 60
  - Density: 0.2/km^{2} (0.52/sq mi)
  - Pop (2016-21): ▼30.2%
  - Dwellings: 39
- Time zone: UTC−05:00 (EST)
  - Summer (DST): UTC−04:00 (EDT)
- Highways: No major routes

Rivière-Ojima is an unorganized territory in the Abitibi-Témiscamingue region of Quebec, Canada. It consists of two non-contiguous areas in the Abitibi-Ouest Regional County Municipality, separated by the municipality of Authier-Nord. The hamlets of Languedoc (48°48′26″N 78°41′48″W) and Saint-Eugène-de-Chazel (48°57′06″N 78°58′38″W) are located within its boundaries.

Founded in 1949, Languedoc is the youngest rural population centre in the Abitibi region and named after the Languedoc Regiment, which arrived in New France in 1755 from Languedoc in southern France. The Parish of Saint-Etienne-de-Languedoc was formed in 1952.

== Demographics ==
=== Population ===
Canada census – Rivière-Ojima community profile

	2021	2016	2011
Population	60 (-30.2% from 2016)	86 (-17.3% from 2011)	104 (-17.5% from 2006)
Land area	354.47 km^{2} (136.86 sq mi)	356.56 km^{2} (137.67 sq mi)	356.04 km^{2} (137.47 sq mi)
Population density	0.2/km^{2} (0.52/sq mi)	0.2/km^{2} (0.52/sq mi)	0.3/km^{2} (0.78/sq mi)
Median age	57.6 (M: 57.6, F: 58.0)	54.5 (M: 54.5, F: 54.5)	50.6 (M: 54.5, F: 48.5)
Private dwellings	39 (total)	53 (total)	51 (total)
Median household income	$.N/A	$.N/A	$.N/A

Notes: Income data for this area has been suppressed for data quality or confidentiality reasons.
References: 2021 2016 2011

Historical census populations – Rivière-Ojima, Quebec

Year	Pop.	±%
1986	183	—
1991	147	−19.7%
1996	119	−19.0%
2001	110	−7.6%

Year	Pop.	±%
2006	126	+14.5%
2011	104	−17.5%
2016	86	−17.3%
2021	60	−30.2%

Source: Statistics Canada

=== Language ===
Canada Census Mother Tongue - Rivière-Ojima, Quebec
Census	Total	French			English			French & English			Other		
Year	Responses	Count	Trend	Pop %	Count	Trend	Pop %	Count	Trend	Pop %	Count	Trend	Pop %
2011	100	100	▼16.7%	100.00%	0	0.0%	0.00%	0	0.0%	0.00%	0	0.0%	0.00%
2006	120	120	▲4.3%	100.00%	0	0.0%	0.00%	0	0.0%	0.00%	0	0.0%	0.00%
2001	115	115	▼4.2%	100.00%	0	0.0%	0.00%	0	0.0%	0.00%	0	0.0%	0.00%
1996	120	120	n/a	100.00%	0	n/a	0.00%	0	n/a	0.00%	0	n/a	0.00%

== See also ==
- Ojima River
