= Wawagosic River =

Wawagosic
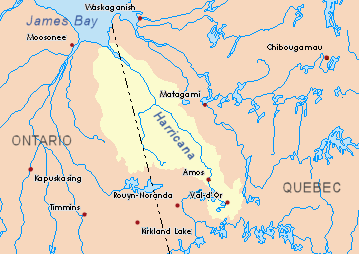
- Harricana River basin in yellow

Location
- Country: Canada
- Province: Quebec
- Region: Nord-du-Québec

Physical characteristics
- Source: Little marsh
  - location: Lac-Chicobi, Quebec, Nord-du-Québec, Quebec
  - coordinates: 48°59′35″N 78°35′36″W
  - elevation: 288 m (945 ft)
- Mouth: Turgeon River
  - location: Eeyou Istchee Baie-James (municipalité), Quebec
  - coordinates: 49°57′51″N 79°05′30″W
  - elevation: 235 m (771 ft)

Basin features
- Tributaries
  - left: (from de mouth) Ménard River, Perdrix River
  - right: (from de mouth) Mistaouac River, Kadabakato River , Tangente River.

The Wawagosic River is a tributary of the Turgeon River flowing the municipality of Eeyou Istchee James Bay (Municipality), in the administrative region of Nord-du-Québec, in Quebec, in Canada.

== Geography ==
The surrounding hydrographic slopes of the Wawagosic River are:

- North side: Turgeon River;
- East side: Octave River (Harricana River);
- South side: Chicobi Lake, Kaomakomiskiwag stream
- West side: Lake Turgeon, Turgeon River.

The water head of the Wawagosic River is located on the border of the administrative regions of Nord-du-Québec and Abitibi-Témiscamingue. The Wawagosic River originates in a small marsh north of Authier Lake, in the unorganized territory of Lac-Chicobi, Quebec, west of the Octave River (Harricana River) and north of Chicobi Lake. This sector is included in the Esker-Mistaouac's proposed biodiversity reserve. The head of the river drains the waters of the western slope of Saucer Hills (altitude: 367 metres (1,204 ft)) and Mount Plamondon (altitude: 445 metres (1,460 ft)).

Located in the southeastern corner of Bacon Township, Wawagosic Lake (length: 4.0 kilometres (2.5 mi)) flows into the river of the same name by the Tangente River which flows 6.9 kilometres (4.3 mi) to the southwest, to reach the Wawagosic River.

The Wawagosic River flows mostly north, with some segment westward, across many marsh areas. On its course, the river drains the waters from the lakes: Motherland, Plamondon, Wawagosic, Cadieux, Carheil, Horney, Morin, Cadieux, Dent, Leblond and Casgrain. The Wawagosic River flows into the Turgeon River which is a tributary of the Harricana River.

== Toponymy ==
According to reports from 1908 surveyors who were exploring the area for the development of northwestern Quebec for the eventual arrival of the National Transcontinental Railway, this river was identified popularly as "Croche River". The name "Wawagotig" of Algonquin origin, meaning "river in zigzag", was also used to describe this body of water. The Algonquins of Pikogan had named Lake Wawagosic; this lake is characterized by its sandy coastline and several islands. This latter meaning applies very well to the river whose clayey and rockless edges have been noted since the beginning of the century.

The toponym "rivière Wawagosic" was made official on December 5, 1968, at the Bank of Place Names of the Commission de toponymie du Québec.

== See also ==
- Mistaouac River, a watercourse
- Kadabakato River, a watercourse
- Tangente River, a watercourse
- Perdrix River (Eeyou Istchee Baie-James), a watercourse
- Menard River, a waterscourse
- Octave River (Harricana River)
- Turgeon River
- Harricana River
- James Bay
- Lac-Chicobi, Quebec, unorganized territory
- Eeyou Istchee James Bay (municipality)
- List of rivers of Quebec
