= Boivin River =

Boivin
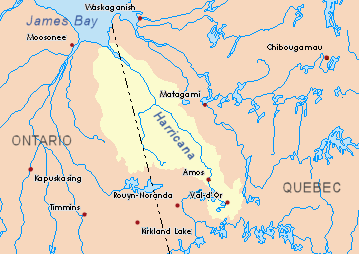
- Harricana River basin in yellow

Location
- Country: Canada
- Province: Ontario
- Region: Nord-du-Québec

Physical characteristics
- Source
  - location: Eeyou Istchee Baie-James (municipality), Quebec
  - coordinates: 49°16′11″N 79°20′04″W
- Mouth: Turgeon River
  - location: Eeyou Istchee Baie-James (municipality), Nord-du-Québec, Quebec
  - coordinates: 49°27′31″N 79°31′18″W
  - elevation: 276 m (906 ft)

The Boivin River is a tributary of the Turgeon River, flowing in the municipality of Eeyou Istchee Baie-James (municipality), in the administrative region of Nord-du-Québec, in Quebec, in Canada.

== Geography ==
The hydrographic slopes near the Boivin River are:

- North side: Turgeon River;
- East side: Hal Creek, Turgeon River;
- South side: South River, La Sarre River;
- West side: Patten River (Ontario).

The Boivin River has its source in the southeastern part of the township of Perron. The river crosses this township in the north direction and part of the canton of Boivin, in the lower part of its course. In its northbound segment, this Quebec river flows parallel to the Ontario border at a distance of between 15.2 kilometres (9.4 mi) and 16 kilometres (9.9 mi).

The upper part of the river has three branches that merge to the southwest of the village of Val-Paradis, Quebec:

- The first designated "Tremblay watercourse" is 7.5 kilometres (4.7 mi) long coming from the southeast and draining between the 5th and the 9th rank. In particular, it drains two marsh areas;
- the second designated "Lavoie stream" has two sub-branches coming from the west, namely the Imbeau lake discharge (altitude: 320 metres (1,050 ft)) and Oloron Lake (altitude: 335 metres (1,099 ft)); and the second is the Domena lake (altitude: 334 metres (1,096 ft)) and Pajegasque lake (altitude: 326 metres (1,070 ft)). The resort is developed around Lake Pajegasque (diameter: 1.1 kilometres (0.68 mi)) which is served by the path of the 4th and 5th ranks. The upper Lavoie River area is located north of the village of Normetal, Quebec, northeast of the Méloizes River. The Lavoie stream originates from a swamp zone (altitude: 298 metres (978 ft)) located north of Chemin du Parallel, which delimits the administrative regions Abitibi-Témiscamingue and Eeyou Istchee Baie-James (municipality). From this zone, this stream flows 8.8 kilometres (5.5 mi) north to the Pejegasque Lake outlet; then 10.7 kilometres (6.6 mi) northerly to the junction from the west;
- The third comes from the west, draining the lands of 10th rank and 1st rank. In the upper part, two sub-branches (8.2 kilometres (5.1 mi) from the north and 3.1 kilometres (1.9 mi) from the south) converge; then the current of this branch runs for 6.6 kilometres (4.1 mi) east of the 10th-1st range and east to join the Boivin River southwest of the village of Val-Paradis, Quebec.

From the confluence of the 3rd branch, the Boivin River flows 1.8 kilometres (1.1 mi) to the north, to road 393 (10th-1st range), which goes to 09 kilometres (5.6 mi) west of the village center of Val-Paradis, Quebec). From this road, the Boivin River flows for 12.5 kilometres (7.8 mi) in the forest zone, to its mouth which empties on the west bank of the Turgeon River. The Boivin River is the main tributary of Quebec's Turgeon River, which empties into the Harricana River; and it spills over the southern shores of James Bay, in Ontario. The Boivin River is the main Quebec tributary of Turgeon River.

== Toponymy ==
The toponym "Boivin River" and the "township of Boivin" are interrelated. Located 45 kilometres (28 mi) north-northwest of La Sarre, Quebec, the township of Boivin is bounded on the west by the provincial border of Quebec and Ontario. This toponym evokes the work of life of Georges-Henri Boivin (1882–1926), Member of Parliament for Shefford County at the House of Commons, at the Canadian Parliament, from 1911 to 1926. He practiced the office of Minister of Customs and Excise in 1925. The canton of Boivin was proclaimed in 1940.

The toponym Boivin River was formalized on December 5, 1968, at the Bank of Place Names of the Commission de toponymie du Quebec.

== See also ==
- Turgeon River, a watercourse
- Harricana River, a watercourse
- James Bay
- Eeyou Istchee James Bay (Municipality)
- List of rivers of Quebec
