= Kabika River =

Kabika
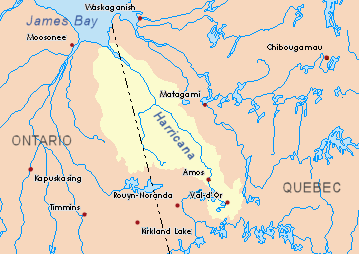
- Harricana River basin in yellow

Location
- Country: Canada
- Province: Ontario
- District: Cochrane

Physical characteristics
- Source
  - location: Cochrane District, Ontario
  - coordinates: 49°01′22″N 79°52′10″W
  - elevation: 298 m (978 ft)
- Mouth: Burntbush River
  - location: Cochrane District, Ontario
  - coordinates: 49°25′19″N 79°47′25″W
  - elevation: 259 m (850 ft)
- Length: 69.3 km (43.1 mi)

The Kabika River is a tributary of the Burntbush River, flowing in the Cochrane District, in Northeastern Ontario, in Canada.

Forestry is the main economic activity of the sector; recreational tourism activities, second. The west side of this slope is served by the Ontario road 652.

The surface of the river is usually frozen from early November to mid-May, but safe circulation on the ice generally occurs from mid-November to the end of April.

== Geography ==
The hydrographic slopes adjacent to the Kabika River are:

- North side: Mikwam River, Burntbush River;
- East side: East Kabika River, Patten River, Turgeon River;
- South side: Lake Abitibi, La Reine River (Lake Abitibi);
- west side: Case River, Kenning River, Seguin River, Payntouk Creek.

The Kabika River originates at the mouth of a small forest lake (altitude: 298 metres (978 ft)) in the north of the township of Scapa. This lake is situated to the northeast of a mountain whose summit reaches 409 metres (1,342 ft). Its mouth is located in the north of the North-East Bay of Lake Abitibi.

From the mouth of the small head lake, the Kabika River flows on 69.3 kilometres (43.1 mi) according to the following segments:

- 3.5 kilometres (2.2 mi) to the mouth of Lake Kabika (length: 1.4 kilometres (0.87 mi), altitude: 291 metres (955 ft) to the north in the township of Scapa) which overlaps the townships of Scapa and Abbotsford;
- 18.6 kilometres (11.6 mi) to the north winding through the township of Abbotsford and Case, to the limit of the township of Singer;
- 20.5 kilometres (12.7 mi) to the north by winding in Singer Township, then Kenning Township to the confluence of the Case River (coming from the West);
- 4.7 kilometres (2.9 mi) to the north winding through Kenning Township, then Singer, to the boundary of the Tomlinson Township;
- 15.6 kilometres (9.7 mi) to the north, then northeast, winding through Tomlinson Township, then Hurtubise, to the confluence of the East Kabika River (coming from the south);
- 6.4 kilometres (4.0 mi) to the north-west by forming a hook to the north-west and another to the south-east, to its mouth.

The confluence of the Kabika River is located in the Hurtubise Township, at 19.9 kilometres (12.4 mi) on the western boundary of the Ontario - Quebec boundary; 18.5 kilometres (11.5 mi) to the west of the mouth of the Burntbush River (confluence with the Turgeon River); 89.3 kilometres (55.5 mi) to the southwest of the mouth of the Turgeon River (confluence with the Harricana River); 86.3 kilometres (53.6 mi) to the southeast of a bay south of Kesagami Lake and 37.9 kilometres (23.5 mi) east of the Ontario Highway 652.

== Toponymy ==
The following toponyms are of the same origin and are in the same area of the Cochrane District: Kabika River, East Kakiba River.

== See also ==
- Burntbush River, a watercourse
- Turgeon River, a stream
- Harricana River, a watercourse
- James Bay
- Cochrane District (Ontario)
- Northeastern Ontario
- List of rivers of Ontario
