= Patten River =

Patten
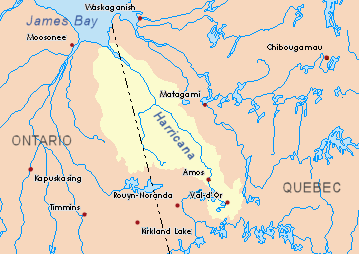
- Harricana River basin in yellow

Location
- Country: Canada
- Provinces: Ontario; Quebec

Physical characteristics
- Source
  - location: Cochrane District, Ontario
  - coordinates: 49°06′52″N 79°28′37″W
- Mouth: Turgeon River
  - location: Cochrane District, Ontario
  - coordinates: 49°27′31″N 79°31′18″W
  - elevation: 259 m (850 ft)
- Length: 51.0 km (31.7 mi)

Basin features
- Tributaries
  - right: Turgeon River

The Patten River is a tributary of the Turgeon River, which flows into the Harricana River in Canada; the latest flows to the southern shore of James Bay. The course of the river pass through mainly North-West of Quebec in Eeyou Istchee Baie-James (municipality), then through North-East of Ontario in Cochrane District, in the city of Cochrane, Ontario. The "Patten River" originated in Quebec in Western part of Eeyou Istchee Baie-James (municipality).

== Geography ==
The neighboring hydrographic slopes of the Patten River are:

- North side: Burntbush River (Ontario);
- East side: Turgeon River (Ontario and Quebec), Boivin River (Quebec);
- South side: Chaboillez River (Ontario), La Reine River (Ontario);
- West side: Kabika River (Ontario), Kabika River East (Ontario), Case River (Ontario).

The main source of the Patten River is Bill Lake (length: 800 metres (2,600 ft), elevation: 298 metres (978 ft)), which is crossed by 0.6 kilometres (0.37 mi) to the west in a marsh area. This lake straddles the Ontario - Quebec border, west of the headland of the Boivin River. Upstream of Bill Lake (on the east side, on the Quebec side), the Patten River has a 3.8 kilometres (2.4 mi) segment in several marsh areas, which collects seven streams converging in five branches over a distance between 1.8 kilometres (1.1 mi) and 3.8 kilometres (2.4 mi), including a:

- stream from the north, flowing 8.2 kilometres (5.1 mi) more or less parallel to the interprovincial boundary;
- stream from the northeast, which flows 11.4 kilometres (7.1 mi), draining some small lakes;
- stream from the northeast, flowing 8.6 kilometres (5.3 mi);
- creek coming from the east, which runs for 4.2 kilometres (2.6 mi);
- creek from the south (Abitibi Hills), which runs 8.9 kilometres (5.5 mi) more or less parallel to the interprovincial boundary. It flows into the Patten River 1.8 kilometres (1.1 mi) from its mouth. He feeds on Lake Poison. It receives the waters of a stream (1.6 kilometres (0.99 mi) long) from the south (near the border), draining an unnamed lake (length: 2.0 kilometres (1.2 mi)).

From the mouth (located on the Ontario side) of Lake Bill, the Patten River flows on:

- 1.7 kilometres (1.1 mi) westward to the east shore of Lake Joe (elevation: 295 metres (968 ft)) in Ontario, which flows 450 metres (1,480 ft) westward in the northern part of the lake;
- 10.0 kilometres (6.2 mi) to North-West forming a curve toward North and receiving many surrounding creeks, up to the mouth of South Patten River (coming from South);
- 7.0 kilometres (4.3 mi) to North-West, up to a creek (coming from South-West);
- 26.8 kilometres (16.7 mi) to North, more or less in parallel with Ontario-Quebec border, then North-East, up to the mouth of Little Clive River (coming from South). Note: In this segment, Patten River penetrates in Ontario up to a maximum of 1,125 kilometres (699 mi) of the interprovincial boundary;
- 22.5 kilometres (14.0 mi) to the North, forming a curve toward West, up to the mouth of the river.

The mouth of the Patten River is located in a swamp area, 2.0 kilometres (1.2 mi) (direct line) west of Ontario - Quebec border, 0.6 kilometres (0.37 mi) south of the mouth of the Burntbush River, 2.9 kilometres (1.8 mi) downstream of the Interprovincial boundary on the Turgeon River and 4.2 kilometres (2.6 mi) upstream of the second interprovincial boundary crossing.

== Toponymy ==
The term "Patten" refers to a family name of English origin.

== See also ==
- South Patten River, a watercouse
- Turgeon River, a watercouse
- Harricana River, a watercouse
- James Bay
- Eeyou Istchee Baie-James (municipality)
- District of Cochrane (Ontario)
- List of rivers of Quebec
- List of rivers of Ontario
