= Burntbush River =

Burntbush
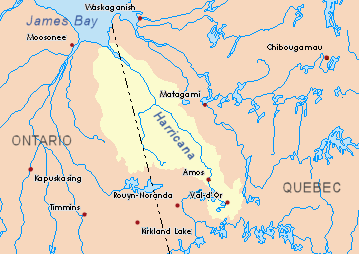
- Harricana River basin in yellow

Location
- Country: Canada
- Province: Ontario
- District: Cochrane

Physical characteristics
- Source
  - location: Cochrane District, Ontario
  - coordinates: 49°36′54″N 80°15′14″W
  - elevation: 304 m (997 ft)
- Mouth: Turgeon River
  - location: Cochrane District, Ontario
  - coordinates: 49°27′51″N 79°32′42″W
  - elevation: 259 m (850 ft)
- Length: 93.1 km (57.8 mi)

Basin features
- Tributaries
  - left: North Burntbush River
  - right: Kabika River (Ontario)

The Burntbush River is a tributary of the Turgeon River in Ontario, which flows into the Harricana River in Quebec; and the latest flows mainly in Quebec before crossing the Ontario border; then this river empties to the southern shore of James Bay in Ontario. The "Burntbush River" originated in Cochrane, Cochrane District, Northeastern Ontario, Canada.

== Geography ==
The hydrographic slopes adjacent to the Burntbush River are:

- North side: Chabbie River (Ontario), Lawagamau River (Ontario), Detour River (Ontario and Quebec);
- East side: Turgeon River (Ontario and Quebec);
- South side: Mikwam River, Little Mikwam River, Porphyry Creek, Kabika River (Ontario), East Kabika River;
- West side: Kesagami River, Wekweyaukastik River, little Wekweyaukastik River, North French River.

The Burntbush River originates at Upper Burntbush Lake (length: 1.8 kilometres (1.1 mi); elevation: 304 metres (997 ft)). The upper part of the river is located south of Lawagamau Lake and east of Ontario Highway 652.

From this lake, the river flows 13.1 kilometres (8.1 mi) east to Singer Lake as the current flows northward for 3.0 kilometres (1.9 mi). After another 1.9 kilometres (1.2 mi) segment, the Burntbush River receives the waters of the North Burntbush Lake discharge. Then the river continues towards 17.9 kilometres (11.1 mi) to the north shore of Burntbush Lake. The latter lake receives the waters of the landfill (from the south) of Soucie and East Soucie lakes. The current crosses Burntbush Lake on its full length, 3.6 kilometres (2.2 mi) to the southeast. The current flows south-easterly for 29.6 kilometres (18.4 mi) to the mouth of the Kabika River (Ontario), which drains the waters of the Kabika East River and several streams including Tomlinson Creek. The river then branches to the northeast for 24 kilometres (15 mi), passing south of Mollet Lake (surrounded by marshes), to its mouth where it flows into the Turgeon River.

The confluence of the Burntbush River is located at 2.0 kilometres (1.2 mi) (direct line) west of the Ontario - Quebec border; 0.6 kilometres (0.37 mi) north of the mouth of the Patten River; 3.5 kilometres (2.2 mi) downstream of the Interprovincial Border on the Turgeon River and 3.6 kilometres (2.2 mi) upstream of the second interprovincial boundary crossing.

== Toponymy ==
The names Upper Burntbush Lake, North Burntbush Lake, Burntbush Lake and Burntbush River are of the same origin.

== See also ==
- Cochrane District (Ontario)
- Northeastern Ontario
- North Burntbush River
- Turgeon River, a watercourse
- Harricana River, a watercourse
- James Bay, a water body
- Patten River, a watercouse
- Kabika River (Ontario), a watercourse
- List of rivers of Ontario
