= Joutel =

Ghost town in Quebec, Canada

Coordinates: 49.46°N 78.31°W

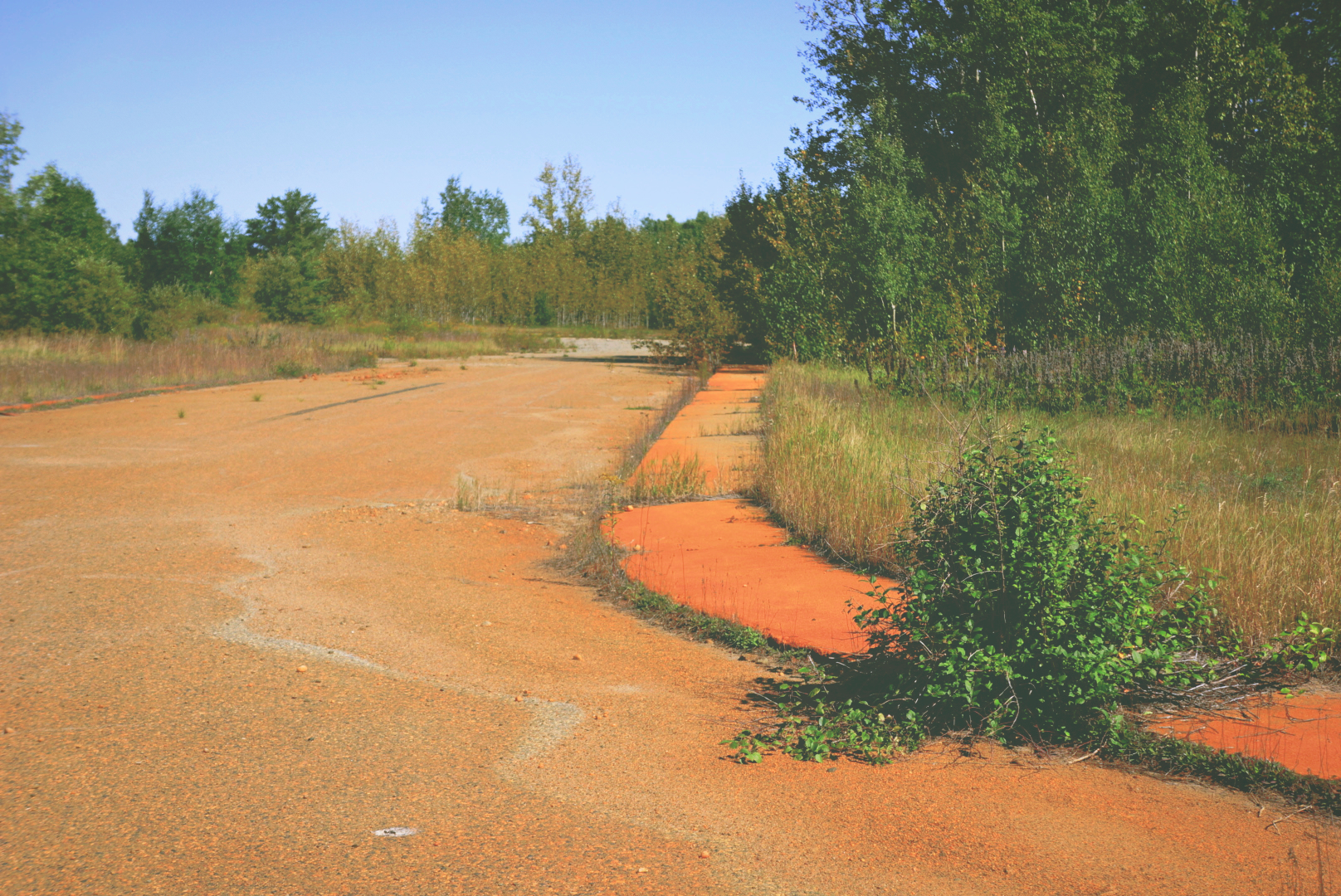
Joutel, Quebec is a ghost town.

Joutel (French pronunciation: [ʒutɛl]) is a ghost town in the Canadian province of Quebec, located in the municipality of Baie-James off Route 109 between Amos and Matagami.

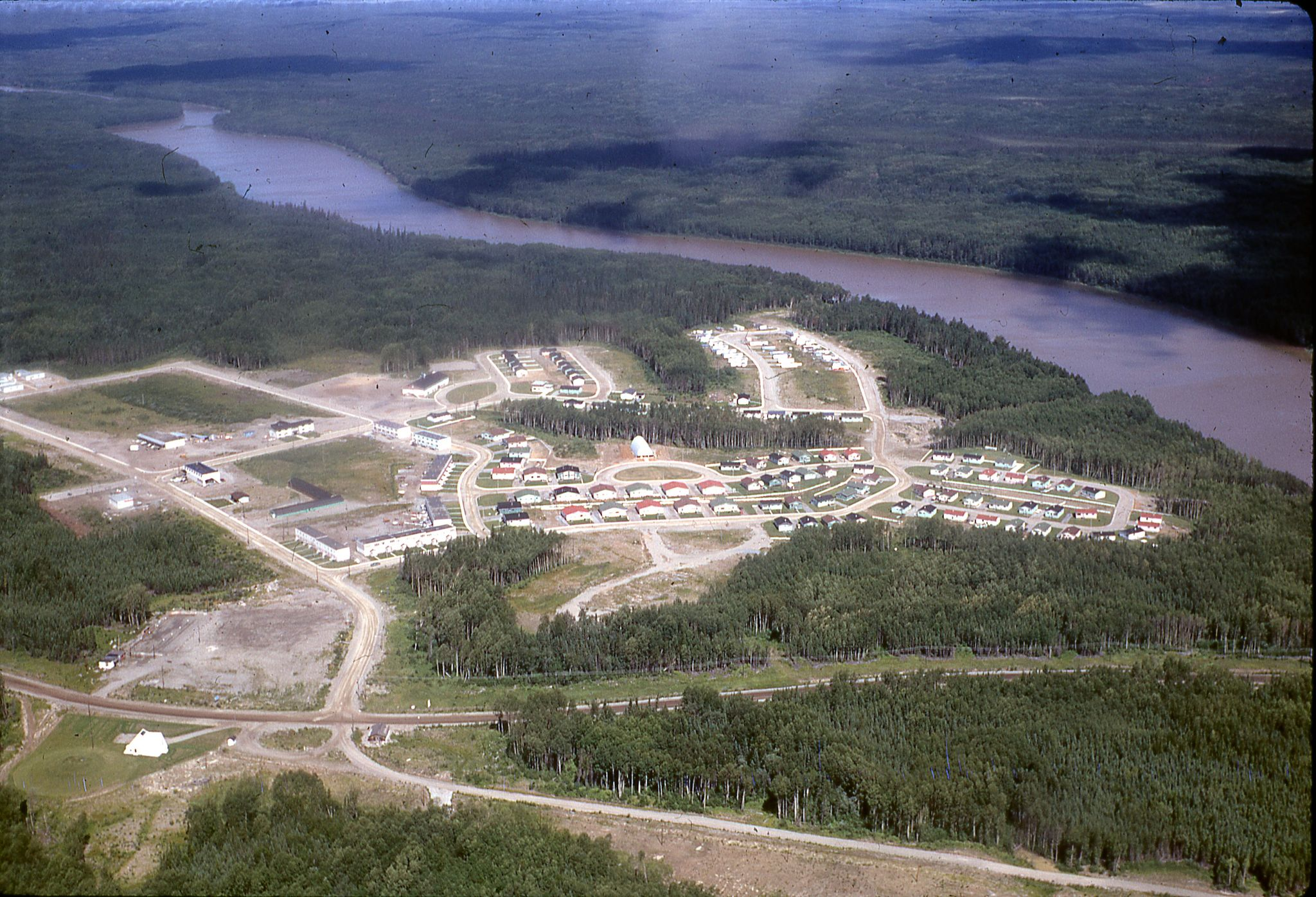
Joutel, circa 1970.

First established in 1965 due to the opening of gold, copper and zinc mines in the area, the community was named for early French explorer Henri Joutel, and had a population of several hundred residents at its peak. In the early 1970s, media services were brought to the community, including rebroadcasters of CKRN-TV and CBF-FM. However, the community was abandoned by 1998, when the ore reserves were depleted enough that the mines were no longer profitable.

As of 2018, the CKRN rebroadcaster that served Joutel is still in operation, to serve a number of recreational properties and rural residents in the surrounding area.
