= Turgeon River (Harricana River tributary) =

Turgeon
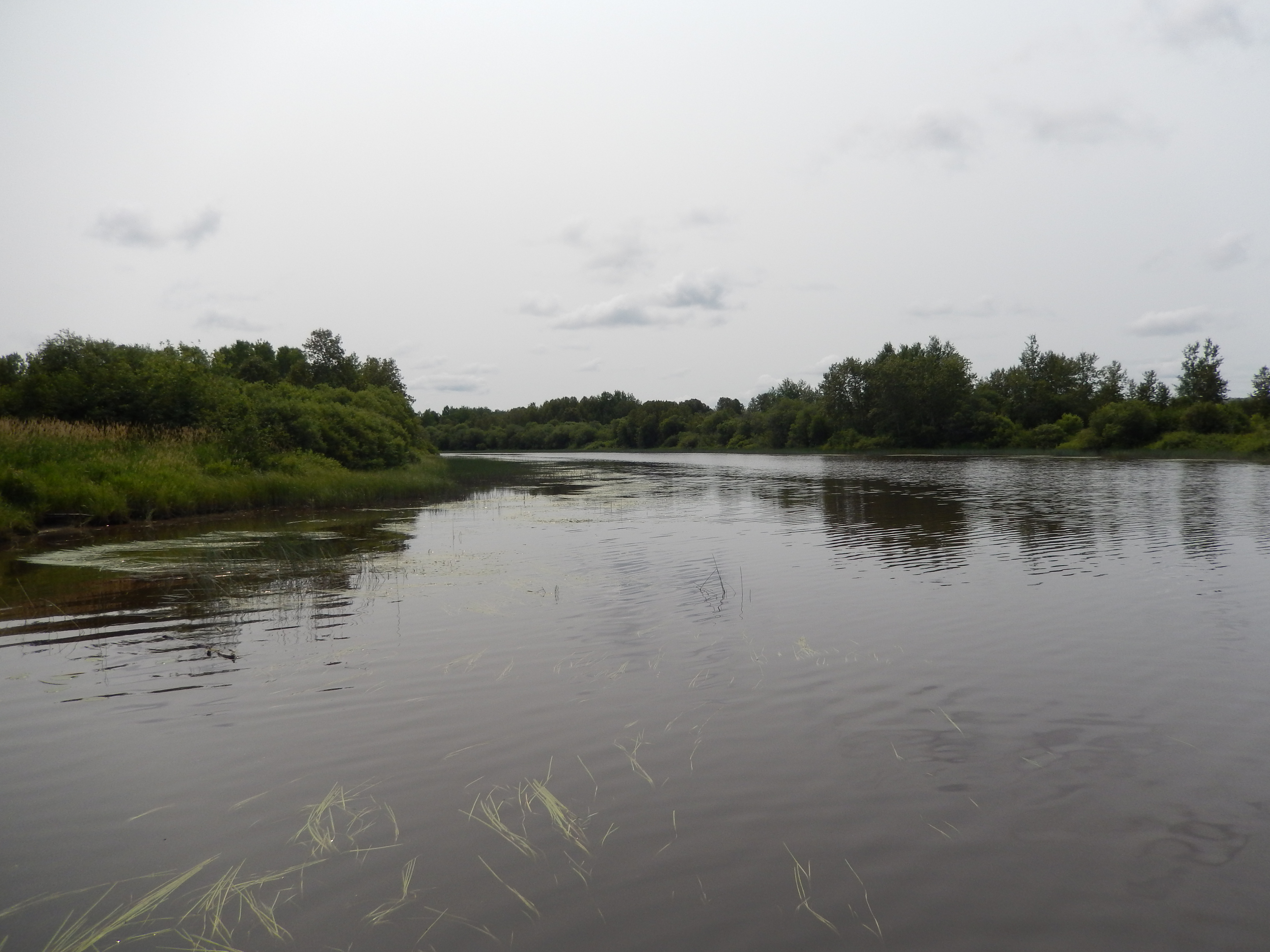
- Turgeon River at Val-Paradis toward head of river

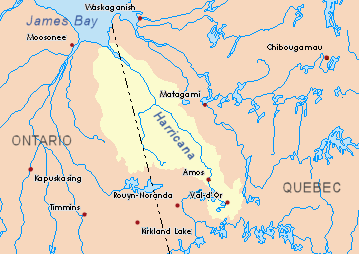
- Harricana River basin in yellow

Location
- Country: Canada
- Provinces: Ontario; Quebec

Physical characteristics
- Source: Lake Turgeon (Eeyou Istchee Baie-James)
  - location: Eeyou Istchee Baie-James (municipality), Nord-du-Québec, Quebec
  - coordinates: 49°00′53″N 79°03′48″W
  - elevation: 288 m (945 ft)
- Mouth: Harricana River
  - location: Eeyou Istchee Baie-James, Quebec
  - coordinates: 50°00′30″N 78°55′58″W
  - elevation: 223 m (732 ft)
- Length: 216.6 km (134.6 mi)

Basin features
- Tributaries
  - left: (from de mouth) Martigny River, Detour River, Garneau River, Turcotte River, Chabbie River, Patten River, Burntbush River, Boivin River, Grenier Creek.
  - right: (from de mouth) Wawagosic River, Théo River, Enjalran River, Corset River, Orfroy creek, Hal creek, Leslie creek, Desrochers creek, Desga creek.

The Turgeon River is a tributary of the Harricana River that flows to the southern shore of James Bay. The Turgeon River is a river flowing mainly in the municipality of Eeyou Istchee Baie-James (municipality), in the administrative region of Nord-du-Québec, in Quebec, in Canada.

== Geography ==
The Turgeon River originates at Lake Turgeon (Eeyou Istchee Baie-James) (length:9.1 kilometres (5.7 mi)), which is located in the administrative region of Abitibi-Temiscamingue (southern part of the lake) and Nord-du-Québec (northern part of the lake). In its northwesterly course, the river flows 62.3 kilometres (38.7 mi), a priori south, west, and northwesterly, up to the confluence of the Boivin River coming from the south); then 3.5 km northwesterly to Orfroy Creek; then 29.0 kilometres (18.0 mi) northwest to the Ontario border.

The Turgeon River makes a 6.7 kilometres (4.2 mi) foray into Ontario where it catches the waters of the Burntbush River and the Patten River. Then the river bifurcates northeast to return to Quebec where it continues for 8.7 kilometres (5.4 mi); then northwards along 49.3 kilometres (30.6 mi) along the interprovincial boundary (at an average distance of 6 kilometres (3.7 mi) to 7 kilometres (4.3 mi) from the border). In this last segment, the river crosses the Rivers-Forests Areas, where Kapipawesig Island is located, for 15.2 kilometres (9.4 mi).

From there, the river collects the waters of the Detour River before turning east and descending 34 kilometres (21 mi), forming a large loop to the south, to the confluence of the Wawagosic River. Then the river flows 13.1 kilometres (8.1 mi) east to the Harricana River. The mouth is located in the municipality of Eeyou Istchee Baie-James (municipality).

=== Main tributaries ===
- Leslie Creek (Quebec)
- Boivin River (Quebec)
- Burntbush River (Ontario)
- Patten River (Quebec / Ontario)
- Detour River (Ontario / Quebec)
- Wawagosic River (Quebec)

=== Crossed cities ===
- Villebois, Quebec
- Valcanton, Quebec

== History ==
Before the arrival of the explorers of European ancestry, these lands were inhabited by Algonquins. The region was covered with forests until the 1930s when a large number of unemployed fleeing the major Canadian cities struck by the global economic crisis arrived there in the hope of establishing themselves and rebuilding their lives.

At the time there was no road, so the people crossed the valley in barge, following the course of river.

Three parishes were founded there in the 1930s, namely Saint-Joachim-de-Beaucanton, Saint-Camille-de-Villebois and Saint-Ephrem-de-Val-Paradis. Today, Beaucanton and Val-Paradis have merged to become Valcanton, Quebec, and these villages are part of the huge municipality of Eeyou Istchee Baie-James (municipality), the largest in the world.

In the 1940s and 1950s, several covered bridges were built in the Turgeon Valley. Five can still be visited today: three on the Turgeon River and two on its tributaries.

== Toponymy ==
The lake and the Turgeon River owe their name to the Minister of Lands and Forests of the time. The proclamation was made by the Honorable Adélard Turgeon in 1908. The first nations named him Nikikwatinipi (Lac Frimas). The name "rivière Turgeon" was officially registered on December 5, 1968, at the Commission de toponymie du Québec.

== See also ==
- Lake Turgeon (Eeyou Istchee Baie-James)
- Eeyou Istchee Baie-James
- Harricana River, a watercourse
- James Bay, a body of water
- Wawagosic River, a watercourse
- Boivin River, a river
- Patten River, a river
- Burntbush River, a watercourse
- Detour River, a river
- List of rivers of Quebec
- List of rivers of Ontario
