= Again River =

Again
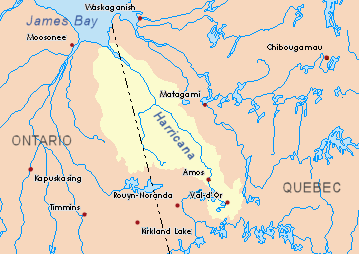
- Harricana River basin in yellow

Location
- Country: Canada
- Provinces: Ontario; Quebec
- District: Cochrane (Ontario)
- Region: Nord-du-Québec (Quebec)
- Municipality: Eeyou Istchee Baie-James (Quebec)

Physical characteristics
- Source: Lake Mine
  - location: Cochrane District, Ontario
  - coordinates: 50°07′06″N 79°39′57″W
  - elevation: 267 m (876 ft)
- Mouth: Harricana River
  - location: District of Cochrane, Ontario
  - coordinates: 50°55′40″N 79°32′08″W
  - elevation: 9 m (30 ft)
- Length: 119.9 km (74.5 mi)

Basin features
- Tributaries
  - left: (from the mouth), Discharge of lake Cotter, Discharge of lake Parson
  - right: (from the mouth), Grenouilles Creek (Quebec), Laforges Creek (Quebec), Discharge of lake Broughton (Ontario)

The Again River is a tributary of the Harricana River in Canada in:

- the Cochrane District in Ontario; and
- the municipality of Eeyou Istchee Baie-James, in the administrative region of Nord-du-Québec, in Quebec.

The surface of the river is usually frozen from early November to mid-May, but safe circulation on the ice generally occurs generally from mid-November to the end of April.

== Geography ==
The main hydrographic slopes adjacent to the Again River are:

- North side: Harricana River;
- Eastern side: Harricana River, Mannerelle River, Malouin River, Breynat River, Despreux River;
- South side: Turgeon River, Detour River;
- West side: Lawagamau River (Ontario), Corner River (Ontario), Seal River (Ontario).

The Again River originates at the mouth of Lake Mine (length: 3.4 kilometres (2.1 mi), elevation: 267 metres (876 ft)) in the eastern part of the Cochrane District.

The source of the Again River is located at:

- 10.4 kilometres (6.5 mi) at the east of the Ontario border;
- 92.5 kilometres (57.5 mi) at the south of the mouth of the Again River;
- 37.6 kilometres (23.4 mi) east of Kesagami Lake (Ontario);
- 118.5 kilometres (73.6 mi) at the south of the mouth of the Harricana River, in Ontario.

From its source, the Again River runs more or less parallel to the Ontario border on 119.9 kilometres (74.5 mi) in the following segments:

- 16.0 kilometres (9.9 mi) to the north through three lakes, northeasterly through two lakes including Lake Favell (Ontario) and eastward up to a branch line (from the south- East) which drains the cross-border area between Quebec and Ontario;
- 55.0 kilometres (34.2 mi) to the boundary between Quebec and Ontario;
- 46.3 kilometres (28.8 mi) to the north in Quebec more or less along the interprovincial boundary and in a marsh area, until the cut between the boundary between Quebec and Ontario;
- 2.6 kilometres (1.6 mi) to the north-west in the Cochrane District in Ontario in the marsh area to the mouth.

The Again River flows into the southwestern shore of the Harricana River in front of Low Shoal Island. This confluence is located at:

- 31.0 kilometres (19.3 mi) at southeast of the mouth of the Harricana River;
- 2.6 kilometres (1.6 mi) at west of the boundary between Quebec and Ontario;
- 88.6 kilometres (55.1 mi) at south of the center of the village of Moosonee in Ontario.

== Toponymy ==
The hydronyme "rivière Again" was formalized on December 5, 1968, by the Commission de toponymie du Québec, at the creation of this commission.

== History ==
The river remained largely unexplored until 2012, when Canadian Adam Shoalts successfully canoed the entire length, discovering canyons and notably numerous previously unknown waterfalls. According to Shoalts in his book Alone Against the North, the name originates from a 1931 surveyor notebook. The surveyor, named King, had been questioning a local Indian trapper about the river, who did not speak English very well, and he kept repeating a word that sounded like "again". Shoalts also said it was believed the river followed a seam that joined Precambrian shield rock with Late Devonian rock.

== See also ==
- Cochrane District, an administrative region of Ontario
- Eeyou Istchee Baie-James (municipality), a municipality
- Jamésie, a region of Northwestern Quebec
- Harricana River, a watercourse
- James Bay, a body of water
- List of rivers of Quebec
- List of rivers in Ontario
