= Corner River =

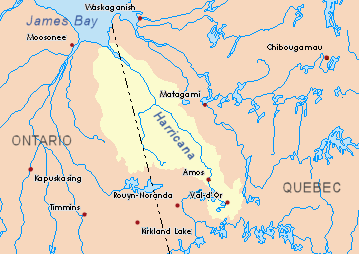
- Harricana River basin in yellow

Location
- Country: Canada
- Province: Ontario

Physical characteristics
- Source: Corner Lakes
  - location: District of Cochrane, Ontario
  - coordinates: 50°07′06″N 79°39′57″W
  - elevation: 266 m (873 ft)
- Mouth: Harricana River
  - location: District of Cochrane, Ontario
  - coordinates: 50°55′40″N 79°32′08″W
  - elevation: 7 m (23 ft)
- Length: 65.2 km (40.5 mi)

The Corner River is a tributary of the Harricana River, flowing in the Cochrane District in Ontario, in Canada.

The surface of the river is usually frozen from early November to mid-May, but safe circulation on the ice generally occurs from mid-November to the end of April.

== Geography ==
The major watersheds adjacent to the Corner River are:

- North side: Harricana River;
- East side: Harricana River, Again River, Mannerelle River, Malouin River;
- South side: Corner Lakes, Detour River;
- West side: Kattawagami River, Lawagamau River, Seal River, Atik River.

The Corner River originates at the mouth of an unidentified lake (length: 2.3 metres (7 ft 7 in); altitude: 269 metres (883 ft)) belonging to a group of lakes identified as "Corner Lakes" in the eastern part of the Cochrane District.

The mouth of this lake of head is located at:

- 8.4 kilometres (5.2 mi) east of the boundary between Ontario and Quebec;
- 72.5 kilometres (45.0 mi) south of the mouth of the Corner River;
- 40.8 kilometres (25.4 mi) east of Kesagami Lake (Ontario);
- 99.4 kilometres (61.8 mi) southwest of the mouth of the Harricana River, in Ontario.

From its source, the Corner River runs more or less parallel to the Ontario and Quebec boundary, on 65.2 kilometres (40.5 mi) in the following segments:

- 19.9 kilometres (12.4 mi) to the north through marsh areas, up to a stream (from the south);
- 22.1 kilometres (13.7 mi) to the North in marsh areas, up to the boundary between Quebec and Ontario;
- 15.8 kilometres (9.8 mi) to the north in Quebec in a marsh area, to a stream (coming from the southwest);
- 21.8 kilometres (13.5 mi) to the north in a marsh area, to a stream (coming from the south-east);
- 7.4 kilometres (4.6 mi) to the north-west, forming a large curve to the southwest, up to the mouth.

Corner River empties on the southwestern shore of the Harricana River in front of Low Shoal Island. This confluence is located at:

- 32.1 kilometres (19.9 mi) southeast of the mouth of the Harricana River;
- 4.3 kilometres (2.7 mi) west of the boundary between Quebec and Ontario;
- 83.1 kilometres (51.6 mi) south of the center of the village of Moosonee in Ontario.

== Toponymy ==
The hydronyme "River Corner" (English origin) is similar to the fact that the mouth of the river flows into a bend of river facing Low Shoal Island. Mariners navigating through the Harricana River through the southern part of the island to James Bay were passing by the river bend. The head lakes of this river are known as "Corner Lakes".

== See also ==
- Cochrane District, an administrative region of Ontario
- Harricana River, a watercourse
- James Bay, a body of water
- List of rivers in Ontario
