= Kesagami =

Kesagami may refer to the following places, all in northeastern Ontario, Canada:

- Kesagami Provincial Park
- Kesagami River, a tributary of the Harricana River
  - Little Kesagami River, a tributary of the Kesagami River
- Kesagami Lake
