= Martigny River =

Martigny
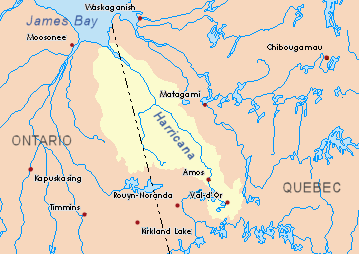
- Harricana River basin in yellow

Location
- Country: Canada
- Province: Quebec
- Region: Eeyou Istchee Baie-James (municipality)

Physical characteristics
- Source: Lac aux Épices
  - location: Eeyou Istchee Baie-James (municipality), Nord-du-Québec, Quebec
  - coordinates: 50°07′47″N 79°11′42″W
  - elevation: 241 m (791 ft)
- Mouth: Turgeon River
  - location: Eeyou Istchee Baie-James, Quebec
  - coordinates: 49°59′20″N 79°00′50″W
  - elevation: 235 m (771 ft)
- Length: 30.2 km (18.8 mi)

Basin features
- Tributaries
  - right: Discharge of Lemoyne Lake.

The Martigny River is a tributary of the Turgeon River, flowing into the Municipality of Eeyou Istchee James Bay (municipality), in Jamésie, in the administrative region from Nord-du-Québec, in Quebec, in Canada. The course of the river crosses the townships of Martigny, Martinière and Lanouillier.

This hydrographic slope is covered by several marsh areas. The surface of the river is usually frozen from early November to mid-May, however, safe ice movement is generally from mid-November to the end of April.

== Geography ==
The main hydrographic slopes near the Martigny River are:

- North side: Harricana River, Breynat River, Mannerelle River, Malouin River;
- East side: Harricana River, Samson River (Baie-James);
- South side: Turgeon River, Wawagosic River;
- West side: Turgeon River, Detour River.

The Martigny River derives its source from "Lac aux Épices" (length: 3.9 kilometres (2.4 mi), altitude: 241 metres (791 ft)), located in the township of Martigny, in the municipality of Eeyou Istchee James Bay (municipality).

The mouth of "Lac aux Épices" is located at:

- 20.7 kilometres (12.9 mi) Northwest of Martigny River mouth (confluence with Turgeon River);
- 103.6 kilometres (64.4 mi) Southeast of the mouth of Harricana River;
- 23.3 kilometres (14.5 mi) Northwest of the mouth of the Turgeon River;
- 23.0 kilometres (14.3 mi) East of the Ontario border.

From the source, the Martigny River flows over 30.2 kilometres (18.8 mi) according to the following segments:

- 4.3 kilometres (2.7 mi) Southeast, to the outlet (coming from the south) of a group of lakes, notably Lemoyne, Laforge and Bouchard;
- 6.0 kilometres (3.7 mi) Southeasterly to the west shore of Lac Martigny;
- 4.6 kilometres (2.9 mi) Southeast across Lake Martigny (length: 5.7 kilometres (3.5 mi); altitude: 242 metres (794 ft)), up to mouth;
- 8.4 kilometres (5.2 mi) Southeast across Finger Lake (length: 2.5 kilometres (1.6 mi); altitude: 242 metres (794 ft)), up to its mouth;
- 6.9 kilometres (4.3 mi) Southeasterly to mouth

The Martigny River flows on the north shore of the Turgeon River, to:

- 6.0 kilometres (3.7 mi) Southwest of the mouth of the Turgeon River;

South of the mouth of the Harricana River

- 36.2 kilometres (22.5 mi) east of the Ontario border;
- 102.3 kilometres (63.6 mi) west of downtown Matagami.

== Toponymy ==
The term "Martigny" is a surname of French origin.

The toponym "rivière Martigny" was formalized on December 5, 1968, at the Commission de toponymie du Québec, when it was founded.

== See also ==
- Eeyou Istchee Baie-James (municipality), a municipality
- Jamésie, a region
- Turgeon River, a watercourse
- Harricana River, a watercourse
- James Bay, a body of water
- List of rivers of Quebec
