= Mannerelle River =

Mannerelle
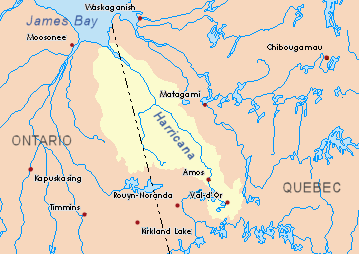
- Harricana River basin in yellow

Location
- Country: Canada
- Province: Quebec
- Region: Nord-du-Québec

Physical characteristics
- Source: Manthet lake
  - location: Eeyou Istchee Baie-James (municipality), Nord-du-Québec, Quebec
  - coordinates: 50°02′07″N 79°22′40″W
  - elevation: 258 m (846 ft)
- Mouth: Malouin River
  - location: Eeyou Istchee Baie-James (municipality), Nord-du-Québec, Quebec
  - coordinates: 50°35′27″N 79°19′01″W
  - elevation: 91 m (299 ft)
- Length: 83.3 km (51.8 mi)

The Mannerelle River is a tributary of the Malouin River, flowing into the municipality of Eeyou Istchee Baie-James (municipality), in the administrative region of Nord-du-Québec, in Quebec, in Canada. Its course crosses the cantons of Massicotte and Manthet.

The surface of the river is usually frozen from early November to mid-May, however, safe ice movement is generally from mid-November to the end of April.

== Geography ==
The main hydrographic slopes near the Mannerelle River are:

- North side: Harricana River, Malouin River;
- East side: Harricana River, Malouin River, Breynat River, Despreux River;
- South side: Turgeon River (Eeyou Istchee James Bay), Detour River;
- West side: Again River (Ontario), Corner River (Ontario), Kattawagami River (Ontario).

The Mannerelle River originates at the mouth of Manthet Lake (length: 2.6 kilometres (1.6 mi), elevation: 258 metres (846 ft)), in the southern part of the Eeyou Istchee James Bay (Municipality).

The source of the Mannerelle River is located at:

- 9.9 kilometres (6.2 mi) East of the Ontario border;
- 61.9 kilometres (38.5 mi) South of the mouth of the Mannerelle River;
- 127.7 kilometres (79.3 mi) West of downtown Matagami;
- 132.7 kilometres (82.5 mi) South-East of the mouth of the Harricana River.

From its source, the Mannerelle River flows more or less parallel to the Ontario border over 83.3 kilometres (51.8 mi) according to the following segments:

- 24.2 kilometres (15.0 mi) towards the North, until the discharge (coming from the South-East) of lakes Nicolas and Arquet;
- 29.1 kilometres (18.1 mi) Northward, to a stream (coming from the Southwest);
- 13.5 kilometres (8.4 mi) Northward, up to a river bend;
- 6.0 kilometres (3.7 mi) Northeasterly from marsh zone to river bend;
- 10.5 kilometres (6.5 mi) Northward in swamp area, to the mouth.

== Toponymy ==
The hydronym "Mannerelle River" was formalized on December 5, 1968, by the Commission de toponymie du Québec, at the creation of this commission.

== See also ==
- Eeyou Istchee Baie-James (municipality), a municipality
- Jamésie, a region
- Harricana River, a watercourse
- Malouin River, a watercourse
- James Bay, a body of water
- List of rivers of Quebec
