= Pesekanaskoskau River =

- Location of the mouth of the Pesekanaskoskau River in Ontario

Location
- Country: Canada
- Province: Ontario
- Region: Northeastern Ontario
- District: Cochrane

Physical characteristics
- Source: Unnamed muskeg
  - coordinates: 50°55′30″N 80°18′34″W
  - elevation: 41 m (135 ft)
- Mouth: Bodell River
  - coordinates: 50°54′25″N 79°56′20″W
  - elevation: 24 m (79 ft)

Basin features
- River system: James Bay drainage basin

The Pesekanaskoskau River is a river in northern Cochrane District in Northeastern Ontario, Canada. It is part of the James Bay drainage basin, and is a left tributary of the Bodell River.

The river begins in unnamed muskeg and flows east to its mouth at the Bodell River. The Bodell River flows via the Kesagami River and the Harricana River to James Bay.

== See also ==
- List of rivers of Ontario

== Sources ==
- Map 15 (PDF) (Map). 1 : 1,600,000. Official road map of Ontario. Ministry of Transportation of Ontario. 2014.
- Restructured municipalities - Ontario map #3 (Map). Restructuring Maps of Ontario. Ontario Ministry of Municipal Affairs and Housing. 2006. Archived from the original on 2014-04-10.
