= Little Shashiskau River =

- Location of the mouth of the Little Shashiskau River in Ontario

Location
- Country: Canada
- Province: Ontario
- Region: Northeastern Ontario
- District: Cochrane

Physical characteristics
- Source: Unnamed lake
  - coordinates: 50°13′31″N 80°00′31″W
  - elevation: 289 m (948 ft)
- Mouth: Shashiskau Lake on the Shashiskau River
  - coordinates: 50°18′58″N 80°01′45″W
  - elevation: 257 m (843 ft)

Basin features
- River system: James Bay drainage basin

The Little Shashiskau River is a river in northern Cochrane District in Northeastern Ontario, Canada. It is part of the James Bay drainage basin, and is a right tributary of the Shashiskau River.

The river begins at an unnamed lake in the Shashiskau Hills and flows north then northwest to Shashiskau Lake as a right tributary of the Shashiskau River. The Shashiskau River flows via the Kesagami River and the Harricana River to James Bay.

== See also ==
- List of rivers of Ontario

== Sources ==
- Map 15 (PDF) (Map). 1 : 1,600,000. Official road map of Ontario. Ministry of Transportation of Ontario. 2014.
- Restructured municipalities - Ontario map #3 (Map). Restructuring Maps of Ontario. Ontario Ministry of Municipal Affairs and Housing. 2006.
