= Shashiskau River =

- Location of the mouth of the Shashiskau River in Ontario

Location
- Country: Canada
- Province: Ontario
- Region: Northeastern Ontario
- District: Cochrane

Physical characteristics
- Source: Unnamed lake
  - coordinates: 50°12′38″N 80°05′09″W
  - elevation: 283 m (928 ft)
- Mouth: Kesagami River
  - coordinates: 50°56′02″N 79°46′55″W
  - elevation: 10 m (33 ft)

Basin features
- River system: James Bay drainage basin
- Tributaries
  - right: Little Shashiskau River

The Shashiskau River is a river in northern Cochrane District in Northeastern Ontario, Canada. It is part of the James Bay drainage basin, and is a right tributary of the Kesagami River.

The river begins at an unnamed lake in the Shashiskau Hills and adjacent to Kesagami Lake and flows north through Shashiskau Lake, where it takes in the right tributary Little Shashiskau River. It continues north, turns northeast, takes in the right tributary Harvey Creek, and reaches its mouth at the Kesagami River. The Kesagami River flows via the Harricana River to James Bay.

== Tributaries ==
- Harvey Creek (right)
- Amisk Creek (left)
- Little Shashiskau River (right)

== See also ==
- List of rivers of Ontario

== Sources ==
- Map 15 (PDF) (Map). 1 : 1,600,000. Official road map of Ontario. Ministry of Transportation of Ontario. 2014.
- Restructured municipalities - Ontario map #3 (Map). Restructuring Maps of Ontario. Ontario Ministry of Municipal Affairs and Housing. 2006. Archived from the original on 2014-04-10.
