= Black River (Bodell River tributary) =

- Location of the mouth of the Black River in Ontario

Location
- Country: Canada
- Province: Ontario
- Region: Northeastern Ontario
- District: Cochrane

Physical characteristics
- Source: Unnamed lake
  - coordinates: 50°28′11″N 80°08′06″W
  - elevation: 268 m (879 ft)
- Mouth: Bodell River
  - coordinates: 50°53′30″N 80°00′51″W
  - elevation: 32 m (105 ft)

Basin features
- River system: James Bay drainage basin

The Black River is a river in northern Cochrane District in Northwestern Ontario, Canada. It is part of the James Bay drainage basin, and is a right tributary of the Bodell River.

The river begins at an unnamed lake and flows north to its mouth at the Bodell River. The Bodell River flows via the Kesagami River and the Harricana River to James Bay.

== See also ==
- List of rivers of Ontario
