= Yolette Lévy =

Haitian-born Canadian politician and activist (1938–2018)

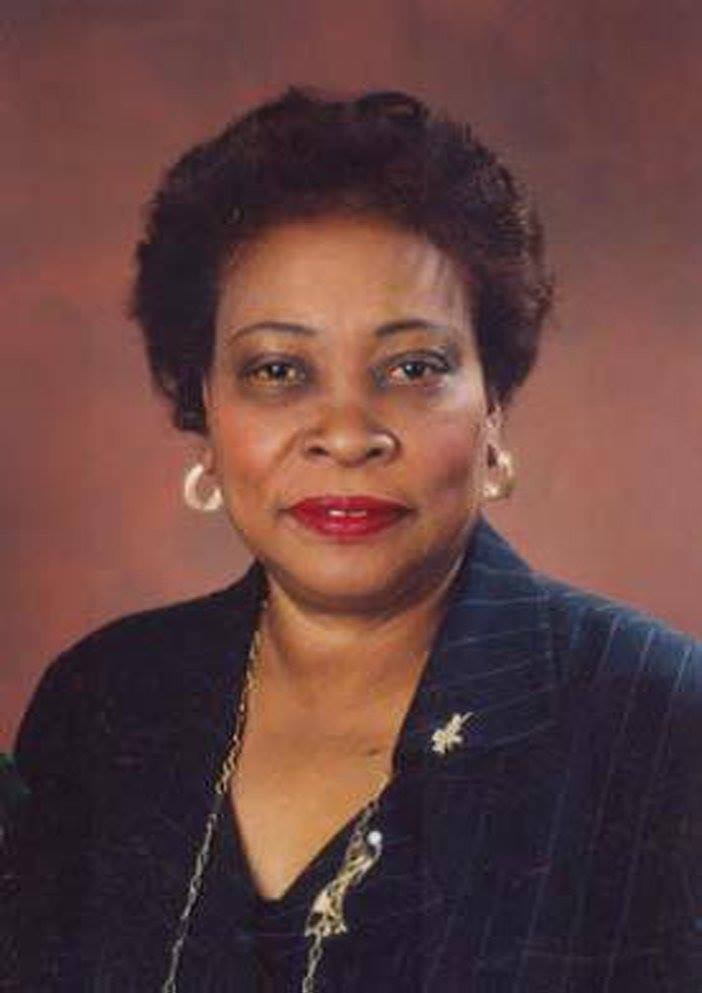
- (1996)
- Born: May 15, 1938; Haiti
- Died: December 6, 2018 (aged 80); Val-d'Or, Quebec, Canada
- Occupations: pharmacist; politician; unionist; feminist; activist
- Known for: Municipal councilor, Val-d'Or
- Spouse: Jean-Emmanuel Alfred
- Children: 3
- Awards: 2005: Alexina-Croteau Prize; 2007: Personality Award from the Val-d’Or Chamber of Commerce; 2007: Prix Charlie Biddle; 2017: Lieutenant Governor's Medal

Yolette Lévy (May 15, 1938 – December 6, 2018) was a Haitian-born Canadian politician and activist from Val-d'Or, in Abitibi-Témiscamingue, Quebec. She was for many years a municipal councilor in Val-d'Or. Originally a pharmacist, she also worked as a feminist activist, trade unionist, and defender of the rights of seniors.

== Early life ==
Yolette Lévy was born May 15, 1938, in Haiti. She hailed from Cap-Haïtien.

== Career ==
Levy worked as a pharmacist in Haiti, before fleeing Duvalierism, arriving in Zaire (now the Democratic Republic of Congo), and teaching for four years in the service of UNESCO. She and her husband, Jean-Emmanuel Alfred, then submitted their applications for teaching positions in Val-d'Or. She arrived in Val-d'Or in 1969, to work as a chemistry teacher at the Le Carrefour high school; her husband taught literature. Upon her arrival she and her husband were among the 12 Haitians in the city.

She became involved in the teachers' union in 1972. On April 8, 1982, she was elected president of the Syndicat des travailleurs de l'enseignement du Nord-Ouest québécois (Union of Education Workers of Northwestern Quebec) (STENOQ) and held this position until June 1984. In June 1984, she was elected to the executive council of the Commission des enseignants des commissions scolaires (School Board Teachers' Commission) of the Centrale des syndicats du Québec. During her union career, she defended several issues concerning women, such as maternity leave, the right to abortion, child care services, and led a major push for pay equity. She also led workshops on the involvement of women in politics.

Lévy was one of the founders of La Mosaïque, the intercultural association for welcoming and integrating immigrants in Abitibi-Témiscamingue. With several others, she filed the organization's letters patent on November 23, 1990, with the Quebec government. The association received its official recognition on February 13, 1991.

From 1996 to 2009, Lévy sat as a municipal councilor in Val-d'Or. She was re-elected in the municipal elections of 2000, 2001 and 2005, but lost the 2009 elections. During her mandates, she contributed to the revision of the family policy, the implementation of the Taxibus public transport service, defending community organizations, and supporting cultural development.

Lévy served as vice-president of the board of directors of the Université du Québec en Abitibi-Témiscamingue (UQAT) from 1998 to 2005.

In 2015, she became president of the section of the Association québécoise de défense des droits des retraités et préretraités (AQDR) (Quebec Association for the Defense of the Rights of Retired and Pre-Retired Persons) in Val-d’Or.

== Personal life ==
She was the mother of three children: Yolette, Jean-Emmanuel, and Henry-Philippe Alfred.

== Death and legacy ==
Yolette Lévy died December 6, 2018, at the Maison de la source Gabriel, a hospice in Val-d'Or, Quebec, Canada.

In December 2017, the Regroupement des femmes de l'Abitibi-Témiscamingue supported the creation of an honorary prize, the Yolette Lévy Award. Élizabeth Larouche was the first person to receive the prize inn 2019. In February 2019 a local beer is created in her memory : Yolette-du-Monde.

== Awards and honours ==
- 2005: Alexina-Croteau Prize, prize from the Regroupement des femmes de l'Abitibi-Témiscamingue which highlights the work of women who have distinguished themselves by their constant commitment to the cause of women in local and regional development
- 2007: Prix de la personnalité de la Chambre de commerce de Val-d'Or (Val-d'Or Chamber of Commerce Personality Award)
- 2007: Prix Charlie Biddle, prize that highlights the exceptional contribution of people who have immigrated to Quebec and whose personal or professional commitment contributes to the cultural and artistic development of Quebec
- 2017: Médaille du lieutenant-gouverneur (Lieutenant Governor's Medal)
