= Université du Québec =

System of public universities in Quebec, Canada

Coordinates: 46.8133°N 71.2223°W

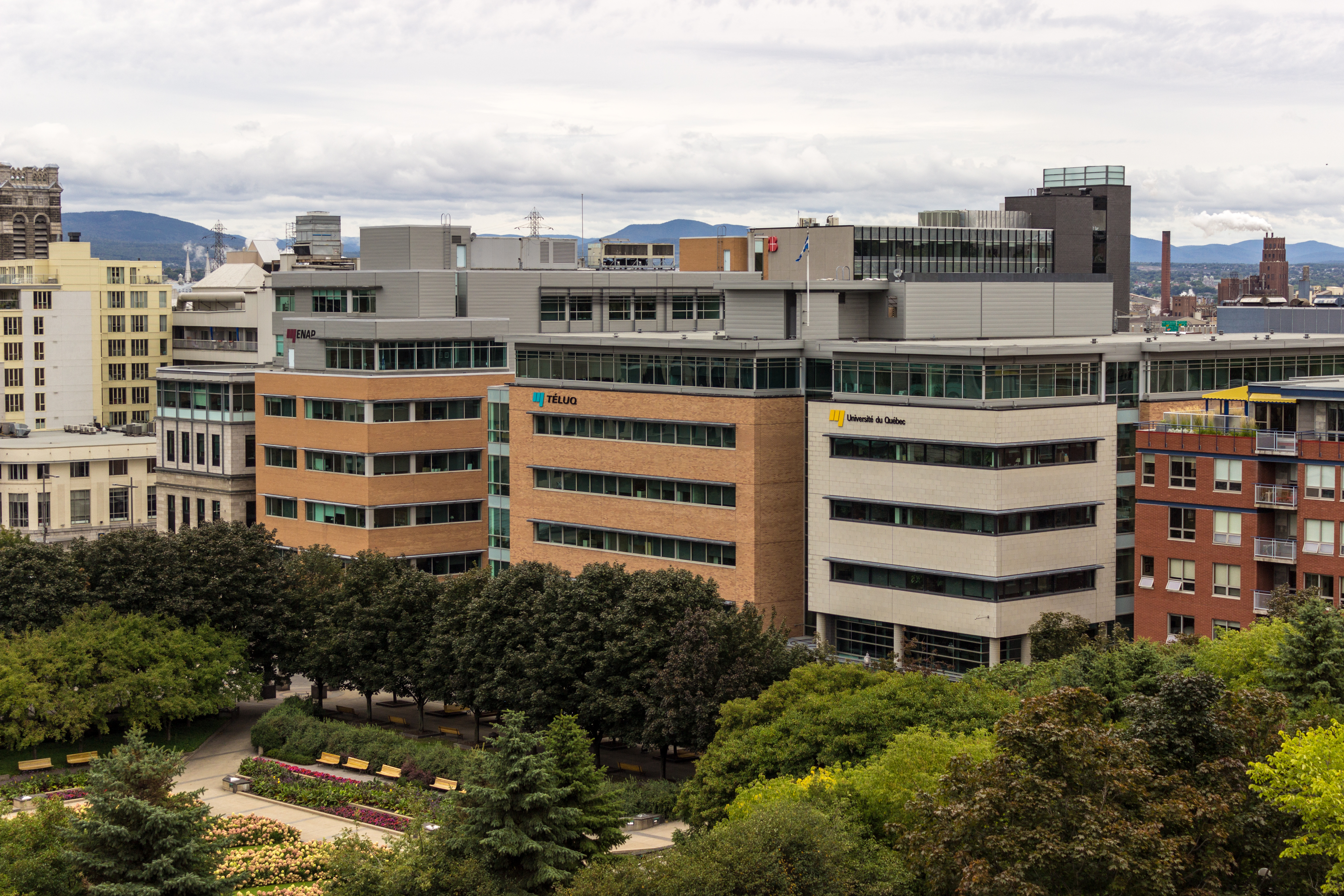
- Administrative headquarters in Quebec City
- Type: Public university system
- Established: 1968; 58 years ago
- Affiliations: AUCC, IAU, AUFC, CARL, CIS, CVU, CUSID,
- President: Alexandre Cloutier
- Academic staff: 3,000+
- Students: 100,000+
- Location: Quebec City, Quebec, Canada
- Campus: Various
Colours
Yellow, Black and Grey
- Website: uquebec.ca

The Université du Québec (French pronunciation: [ynivɛʁsite dy kebɛk]) is a system of ten provincially-run public universities in Quebec, Canada. Its headquarters are in Quebec City. The university coordinates 1400 programs for over 100,000 students. The government of Quebec founded the Université du Québec, a network of universities in several Quebec cities. In a similar fashion to other Canadian provinces, all universities in Quebec have since become public.

== History ==
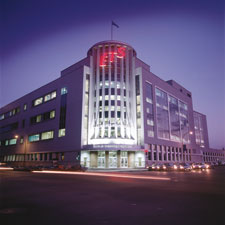
École de technologie supérieure

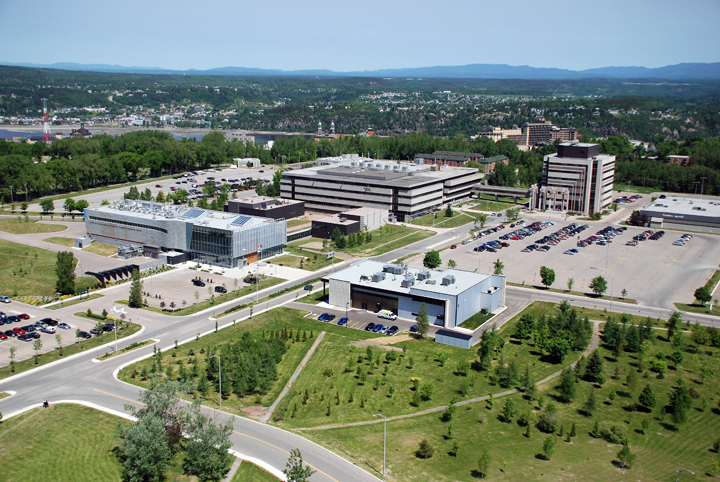
Université du Québec à Chicoutimi

The Université du Québec system was established in 1968 by the National Assembly of Quebec largely in response to widespread student protests that had broken out in the autumn of that year. In an effort to extend education to more Quebecois students, the government had created a system of CEGEPs to create a facilitated pathway into university. However, Quebec did not have enough French-language universities to accommodate the new influx of students applying after completing CEGEP. Only 40% of CEGEP graduates could be accommodated by existing Francophone universities, and job prospects were poor for students who only had a certificate from a CEGEP. As a result, student protests began to spread across the province, with 23 CEGEPs, the Université de Montréal, and Université Laval being occupied by student protesters. Thousands of Francophone students took to the streets in protest, as others barricaded themselves inside their CEGEPs, refusing to leave until their demands were met.

Although the students' demands were often not met and individual protests proved largely unsuccessful, they had captured the attention of Quebec's legislators. Partially as a result of this upheaval, Quebec's government decided to pass a resolution which would create a new network of Francophone universities across the province of Quebec. With the province in the midst of the Quiet Revolution, secularism was becoming pertinent to Quebec society and to a new generation of youth who rejected Catholic domination over Quebecois society, and alternatives to the traditional, existing religious institutions were demanded. Five universities were established in 1969 and 1970 to assuage the influx of CEGEP students, and they were placed in cities across the province to allow equal educational opportunities in areas where access to higher education had traditionally been limited, such as Rimouski and Abitibi. In the 1970s, a sixth university would be added to the network, the Université du Québec en Outaouais in Gatineau. This network of universities was modeled on the American university systems that already existed at that time.

The component institutions are:

- the École de technologie supérieure (ETS), in Montreal;
- the École nationale d'administration publique (ENAP), based in Quebec City, with campuses in Montreal, Gatineau, Trois-Rivières, and Saguenay;
- the Institut national de la recherche scientifique (INRS), based in Quebec City and a campus in Montreal;
- the Université du Québec à Chicoutimi (UQAC), in Saguenay;
- the Université du Québec à Montréal (UQAM), in Montreal;
- the Université du Québec à Rimouski (UQAR), based in Rimouski and a campus in Lévis;
- the Université du Québec à Trois-Rivières (UQTR), based in Trois-Rivières and a campus in Quebec City;
- the Université du Québec en Abitibi-Témiscamingue (UQAT), with campuses in Rouyn-Noranda, Val-d'Or, and other towns;
- the Université du Québec en Outaouais (UQO), in Gatineau with a campus in Saint-Jérôme.
- the Université TÉLUQ, distance education based in Quebec city

University rankings

Global – Overall
- QS World: 851-900 (2026)

== See also ==
- Quebec education system
- List of universities in Quebec
