= Bodell River =

- Location of the mouth of the Bodell River in Ontario

Location
- Country: Canada
- Province: Ontario
- Region: Northeastern Ontario
- District: Cochrane

Physical characteristics
- Source: Bodell Lake
  - coordinates: 50°27′38″N 80°15′48″W
  - elevation: 264 m (866 ft)
- Mouth: Kesagami River
  - coordinates: 50°55′11″N 79°52′54″W
  - elevation: 18 m (59 ft)

Basin features
- River system: James Bay drainage basin
- Tributaries
  - left: Pesekanaskoskau River
  - right: Black River

The Bodell River is a river in northern Cochrane District in Northeastern Ontario, Canada. It is part of the James Bay drainage basin, and is a left tributary of the Kesagami River.

The river begins at Bodell Lake and heads north. It turns northeast, takes in the right tributary Black River and left tributary Pesekanaskoskau River, and reaches its mouth at the Kesagami River. The Kesagami River flows via the Harricana River to James Bay.

== See also ==
- List of rivers of Ontario

== Sources ==
- Map 15 (PDF) (Map). 1 : 1,600,000. Official road map of Ontario. Ministry of Transportation of Ontario. 2014.
- Restructured municipalities - Ontario map #3 (Map). Restructuring Maps of Ontario. Ontario Ministry of Municipal Affairs and Housing. 2006. Archived from the original on 2014-04-10.
