= 2014 Quebec Scotties Tournament of Hearts =

- Host city: Val-d'Or, Quebec
- Arena: Belvedere Sports Club
- Dates: January 13–19
- Winner: Allison Ross
- Curling club: Glenmore CC, Dollard-des-Ormeaux
- Skip: Allison Ross
- Third: Melissa Gannon
- Second: Brittany O'Rourke
- Lead: Pamela Nugent
- Alternate: Lisa Davies
- Finalist: Kim Mastine

The 2014 Quebec Scotties Tournament of Hearts, the provincial women's curling championship for Quebec, was held from January 13 to 19 at the Belvedere Sports Club in Val-d'Or. The winning team of Allison Ross will represent Quebec for the second consecutive year at the 2014 Scotties Tournament of Hearts in her hometown of Montreal.

== Teams ==
The teams are listed as follows:

Skip	Third	Second	Lead	Alternate	Club(s)
Ève Bélisle	Joëlle Belley	Martine Comeau	Camille Lapierre	Laura Thomas	TMR Curling Club, Mont-Royal; Glenmore Curling Club, Dollard-des-Ormeaux
Geneviève Frappier	Josée Friolet	Catherine Lavigne	Kimberley Beardsell		Baie-d'Urfé Curling Club, Baie-d'Urfé; Club de curling Longue-Pointe, Montreal; TMR Curling Club, Mont-Royal
Mélissa Germain	Caroline Hains	Pascale Benoit	Lyne Caron	Isabelle Germain	Club Sports Belvédère, Val-d'Or
Kim Mastine	Nathalie Audet	Amélie Blais	Saskia Hollands		Club de curling Sherbrooke, Sherbrooke; Club de curling Etchemin, Saint-Romuald; Club de curling Boucherville, Boucherville
Sophie Morissette	Annie Cadorette	Anik Brascoup	Katia Brascoup		Club de curling Laviolette, Trois-Rivières
Roxane Perron	Marie-Josée Fortier	Miriam Perron	Sonia Delisle		Club de curling Trois-Rivières, Trois-Rivières
Allison Ross	Melissa Gannon	Brittany O'Rourke	Pamela Nugent	Lisa Davies	Glenmore Curling Club, Dollard-des-Ormeaux
Alanna Routledge	Sian Canavan	Laura Wood	Sarah Jane Sass		Glenmore Curling Club, Dollard-des-Ormeaux

== Round-robin standings ==
Final round-robin standings

Key
Teams to Playoffs

Skip (Club)	W	L
Allison Ross (Glenmore)	6	1
Kim Mastine (Sherbrooke/Etchemin/Boucherville)	6	1
Roxane Perron (Trois-Rivières)	5	2
Ève Bélisle (TMR/Glenmore)	4	3
Sophie Morissette (Laviolette)	3	4
Alanna Routledge (Glenmore)	2	5
Geneviève Frappier (Baie-d'Urfé/Longue-Pointe/TMR)	1	6
Mélissa Germain (Belvédère)	1	6

== Round-robin results ==
=== Draw 1 ===
Monday, January 13, 12:00

Sheet A	1	2	3	4	5	6	7	8	9	10	Final
Roxane Perron	0	1	0	1	0	1	0	2	0	X	5
Kim Mastine	0	0	2	0	4	0	3	0	2	X	11

Sheet B	1	2	3	4	5	6	7	8	9	10	Final
Sophie Morissette	0	0	0	2	1	0	2	1	0	1	7
Geneviève Frappier	0	1	1	0	0	1	0	0	3	0	6

Sheet C	1	2	3	4	5	6	7	8	9	10	Final
Mélissa Germain	1	0	0	0	0	1	0	1	0	X	3
Allison Ross	0	0	1	2	0	0	3	0	2	X	8

Sheet D	1	2	3	4	5	6	7	8	9	10	11	Final
Alanna Routledge	0	0	2	1	0	0	1	1	0	1	0	6
Ève Bélisle	0	1	0	0	2	2	0	0	1	0	1	7

=== Draw 2 ===
Monday, January 13, 19:30

Sheet A	1	2	3	4	5	6	7	8	9	10	Final
Ève Bélisle	1	1	0	1	0	0	5	X	X	X	8
Mélissa Germain	0	0	1	0	0	1	0	X	X	X	2

Sheet B	1	2	3	4	5	6	7	8	9	10	Final
Kim Mastine	1	3	0	1	1	1	X	X	X	X	7
Alanna Routledge	0	0	1	0	0	0	X	X	X	X	1

Sheet C	1	2	3	4	5	6	7	8	9	10	Final
Geneviève Frappier	2	0	1	0	0	2	0	0	0	X	5
Roxane Perron	0	2	0	1	1	0	2	1	1	X	8

Sheet D	1	2	3	4	5	6	7	8	9	10	Final
Allison Ross	2	0	0	3	1	0	1	2	X	X	9
Sophie Morissette	0	1	0	0	0	2	0	0	X	X	3

=== Draw 3 ===
Tuesday, January 14, 15:45

Sheet A	1	2	3	4	5	6	7	8	9	10	Final
Alanna Routledge	0	0	1	1	0	0	1	0	2	X	5
Allison Ross	1	1	0	0	2	3	0	1	0	X	8

Sheet B	1	2	3	4	5	6	7	8	9	10	Final
Roxane Perron	0	1	0	1	0	4	0	0	4	X	10
Ève Bélisle	1	0	0	0	1	0	2	2	0	X	6

Sheet C	1	2	3	4	5	6	7	8	9	10	11	Final
Sophie Morissette	0	0	1	0	2	1	0	0	3	0	0	7
Kim Mastine	1	1	0	1	0	0	0	2	0	2	1	8

Sheet D	1	2	3	4	5	6	7	8	9	10	Final
Mélissa Germain	0	3	2	0	0	1	0	0	1	0	7
Geneviève Frappier	1	0	0	1	2	0	1	2	0	2	9

=== Draw 4 ===
Wednesday, January 15, 8:15

Sheet A	1	2	3	4	5	6	7	8	9	10	Final
Sophie Morissette	0	0	0	0	0	X	X	X	X	X	0
Ève Bélisle	0	1	1	3	1	X	X	X	X	X	6

Sheet B	1	2	3	4	5	6	7	8	9	10	Final
Geneviève Frappier	1	1	0	0	0	1	1	0	1	0	5
Alanna Routledge	0	0	1	1	2	0	0	1	0	1	6

Sheet C	1	2	3	4	5	6	7	8	9	10	Final
Kim Mastine	1	0	2	0	0	2	2	2	X	X	9
Mélissa Germain	0	1	0	1	1	0	0	0	X	X	3

Sheet D	1	2	3	4	5	6	7	8	9	10	Final
Roxane Perron	0	0	1	0	1	0	0	2	1	X	5
Allison Ross	0	1	0	1	0	1	0	0	0	X	3

=== Draw 5 ===
Wednesday, January 15, 15:45

Sheet A	1	2	3	4	5	6	7	8	9	10	Final
Mélissa Germain	0	1	0	2	1	2	1	0	1	X	8
Roxane Perron	1	0	1	0	0	0	0	1	0	X	3

Sheet B	1	2	3	4	5	6	7	8	9	10	Final
Allison Ross	0	1	0	2	0	0	2	0	2	X	7
Kim Mastine	0	0	1	0	2	0	0	1	0	X	4

Sheet C	1	2	3	4	5	6	7	8	9	10	Final
Ève Bélisle	1	0	2	1	0	1	0	1	0	2	8
Geneviève Frappier	0	1	0	0	1	0	2	0	1	0	5

Sheet D	1	2	3	4	5	6	7	8	9	10	11	Final
Sophie Morissette	1	0	0	1	1	0	0	1	0	1	1	6
Alanna Routledge	0	0	1	0	0	2	1	0	1	0	0	5

=== Draw 6 ===
Thursday, January 16, 8:15

Sheet A	1	2	3	4	5	6	7	8	9	10	Final
Allison Ross	0	0	2	0	2	0	1	0	1	1	7
Geneviève Frappier	1	0	0	1	0	1	0	2	0	0	5

Sheet B	1	2	3	4	5	6	7	8	9	10	Final
Mélissa Germain	0	1	0	1	0	2	1	0	2	1	8
Sophie Morissette	2	0	4	0	1	0	0	2	0	0	9

Sheet C	1	2	3	4	5	6	7	8	9	10	Final
Roxane Perron	0	0	1	0	0	0	1	1	0	2	5
Alanna Routledge	0	0	0	0	3	0	0	0	1	0	4

Sheet D	1	2	3	4	5	6	7	8	9	10	Final
Ève Bélisle	0	1	0	2	2	0	0	2	0	0	7
Kim Mastine	0	0	2	0	0	2	0	0	2	2	8

=== Draw 7 ===
Thursday, January 16, 15:45

Sheet A	1	2	3	4	5	6	7	8	9	10	Final
Roxane Perron	2	0	0	2	0	2	0	1	0	3	10
Sophie Morissette	0	1	2	0	2	0	1	0	3	0	9

Sheet B	1	2	3	4	5	6	7	8	9	10	Final
Kim Mastine	2	1	0	1	0	0	3	1	X	X	8
Geneviève Frappier	0	0	1	0	0	1	0	0	X	X	2

Sheet C	1	2	3	4	5	6	7	8	9	10	11	Final
Allison Ross	0	0	2	0	0	2	0	0	0	1	1	6
Ève Bélisle	0	1	0	1	1	0	0	2	0	0	0	5

Sheet D	1	2	3	4	5	6	7	8	9	10	Final
Alanna Routledge	3	3	1	0	1	X	X	X	X	X	8
Mélissa Germain	0	0	0	1	0	X	X	X	X	X	1

== Playoffs ==
Semifinal			Final
			1	Allison Ross	7
2	Kim Mastine	6	2	Kim Mastine	4
3	Roxane Perron	5

=== Semifinal ===
Friday, January 17, 19:30

Sheet B	1	2	3	4	5	6	7	8	9	10	11	Final
Kim Mastine	0	0	1	1	0	1	0	0	2	0	1	6
Roxane Perron	0	2	0	0	0	0	1	1	0	1	0	5

=== Final ===
Saturday, January 18, 13:00

Sheet C	1	2	3	4	5	6	7	8	9	10	Final
Allison Ross	0	0	1	2	0	2	1	1	0	X	7
Kim Mastine	2	0	0	0	1	0	0	0	1	X	4

2014 Quebec Scotties Tournament of Hearts

Allison Ross
3rd Quebec Provincial Championship title
