= Despreux River =

Despreux
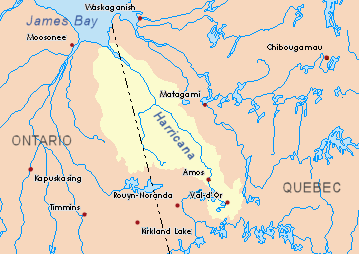
- Harricana River basin in yellow

Location
- Country: Canada
- Province: Quebec
- Region: Nord-du-Québec

Physical characteristics
- Source
  - location: Eeyou Istchee Baie-James (municipality), Nord-du-Québec, Quebec
  - coordinates: 50°10′32″N 79°04′53″W
  - elevation: 261 m (856 ft)
- Mouth: Harricana River
  - location: Eeyou Istchee Baie-James (municipality), Nord-du-Québec, Quebec
  - coordinates: 50°30′54″N 79°08′14″W
  - elevation: 97 m (318 ft)
- Length: 44.7 km (27.8 mi)

The Despreux River is a tributary of the Harricana River, flowing into the municipalities of Eeyou Istchee Baie-James (municipality), in Jamésie, in the administrative region from Nord-du-Québec, in Quebec, in Canada.

The surface of the river is usually frozen from early November to mid-May, however, safe ice movement is generally from mid-November to the end of April.

== Geography ==
The main hydrographic slopes near the Despreux River are:

- North side: Breynat River, Harricana River, Joncas River;
- East side: Harricana River, Joncas River;
- South side: Turgeon River (Eeyou Istchee James Bay), Martigny River;
- West side: Breynat River, Malouin River, Mannerelle River.

The Despreux River derives its source from a forest stream (elevation: 261 metres (856 ft)), located in the municipality of Eeyou Istchee James Bay (municipality).

The source of the Despreux River located at:

- 8.5 kilometres (5.3 mi) West of the Harricana River;
- 15.1 kilometres (9.4 mi) East of the source of the Malouin River;
- 30.5 kilometres (19.0 mi) East of the Ontario border.

From the source, the Despreux River flows over 44.7 kilometres (27.8 mi) according to the following segments:

- 15.4 kilometres (9.6 mi) north, to the dump (coming from the South-East) of Lake Despreux;
- 24.9 kilometres (15.5 mi) to the North, to a creek (coming from the South);
- 4.4 kilometres (2.7 mi) northeasterly to mouth.

The Despreux River flows on the west bank of the Harricana River across the Island of Seven Mile, to:

- 88.6 kilometres (55.1 mi) South-East of the mouth of the Harricana River;
- 26.9 kilometres (16.7 mi) East of the Ontario border;
- 136 kilometres (85 mi) North-West of downtown Matagami, Quebec.

== Toponymy ==
The toponym "Despreux River" was formalized on December 5, 1968, at the Commission de toponymie du Québec, when it was founded.

== See also ==
- List of rivers of Quebec
