= Little Kesagami River =

- Location of the mouth of the Little Kesagami River in Ontario

Location
- Country: Canada
- Province: Ontario
- Region: Northeastern Ontario
- District: Cochrane

Physical characteristics
- Source: Little Kesagami Lake
  - coordinates: 49°46′09″N 80°17′14″W
  - elevation: 298 m (978 ft)
- Mouth: Kesagami River
  - coordinates: 49°55′01″N 80°19′45″W
  - elevation: 282 m (925 ft)

Basin features
- River system: James Bay drainage basin

The Little Kesagami River is a river in northern Cochrane District in Northeastern Ontario, Canada. It is part of the James Bay drainage basin, and is a right tributary of the Kesagami River.

The river begins at Little Kesagami Lake just west of Ontario Highway 652 and flows north to its mouth at the Kesagami River. The Kesagami River flows via the Harricana River to James Bay.

== See also ==
- List of rivers of Ontario

== Sources ==
- Map 15 (PDF) (Map). 1 : 1,600,000. Official road map of Ontario. Ministry of Transportation of Ontario. 2014.
- Restructured municipalities - Ontario map #3 (Map). Restructuring Maps of Ontario. Ontario Ministry of Municipal Affairs and Housing. 2006.
