= Adam Shoalts =

Canadian writer (born 1986)

- Born: 1986 (age 39–40); Fenwick, Ontario, Canada
- Occupations: Writer, explorer
- Known for: Alone Against the North

Adam Shoalts (b. 1986) is a Canadian historian, archaeologist, author and explorer. His books focus on exploration and natural history in the Canadian far north. Canadian Geographic included him on their list of the 90 most influential explorers in Canadian history

== Biography ==
Shoalts was born in 1986 and raised in Ontario near Fenwick, about 10 miles west of Niagara Falls, adjacent to a wooded area that he explored as a child. His father instilled a love of the outdoors, and skills like canoe building and fishing. He earned a BA from Brock University (2009), and a multidisciplinary Masters and Doctorate from McMaster University (2019) that included studies in nature, history, archaeology, and geography. Shoalts' thesis is titled The Evolution of "Monsters" in North American Exploration and Travel Literature 1607-1930 in which he explores the stories of the "sasquatch", "windigo", and "grisly bear" in North American history.

== Writings ==
He has published over 100 articles on topics such as edible mushrooms, African explorers and watershed pollution in northern Canada.

The novel Sense of Adventure: An Account of a Journey in the Canadian Wilderness was his first published book.

Alone Against the North is a composite memoir of two solo exploration trips made in his 20s. In 2011, he explored by canoe the 96-kilometre length of the so-called "nameless river", because it had never been named or explored according to historical records. The unnamed river is a tributary of the Sutton River which itself empties into Hudson Bay. In 2012, he explored by canoe the full length of the Again River from headwaters to near the mouth of the Harricana River on James Bay, roughly traversing south to north along the Quebec-Ontario border. There he discovered numerous cataract, canyons, waterfalls, lakes, groves, islands - most previously not visible in old satellite and airplane surveys. Both trips were sponsored by the Royal Canadian Geographical Society, "Shoalts's work will change the map of Canada – a rarity in 21st century exploration," said the RCGS. One of the waterfalls he discovered was over 40 feet tall, possibly the largest waterfall discovered in Canada for nearly 100 years.

The CBC placed his book, Beyond the Trees: A Journey Alone Across Canada's Arctic, on their recommended reading list for the winter of 2020. The book chronicles a 4,000 kilometres (2,500 mi) wilderness canoe trip he took to celebrate Canada's sesquicentennial. The trek was also featured in the documentary Alone Across the Arctic.

== Awards and honors ==
He is an elected Fellow of the Royal Canadian Geographical Society. In 2020, Canadian Geographic included him on their list of the 90 most influential explorers in Canadian history.

In 2016, Shoalts was named a national champion of the Trans-Canada Trail. In 2018 he was named Explorer-in-Residence of the Royal Canadian Geographical Society. In 2021, the Writers' Trust of Canada asked him to serve as a judge for the Weston Prize. In 2022, he was given the Louie Kamookak Medal.

== Publications ==
- Adam Shoalts (2025). Vanished Beyond the Map: The Mystery of Lost Explorer Hubert Darrell. Allen Lane. ISBN 978-0735236868.
- Adam Shoalts (2023). Where the Falcon Flies: A 3,400 Kilometre Odyssey From My Doorstep to the Arctic. Penguin Books. ISBN 9780735241015.
- Adam Shoalts (2021). The Whisper On The Night Wind: The True History Of A Wilderness Legend. Penguin Books. ISBN 9780735241060.
- Adam Shoalts (2019). Beyond the Trees: A Journey Alone Across Canada's Arctic. Penguin Books. ISBN 9780735236844.
- Adam Shoalts (2017). A History of Canada in Ten Maps: Epic Stories of Charting a Mysterious Land. Penguin Books. ISBN 9780143194002.
- Adam Shoalts (2015). Alone Against the North: An Expedition into the Unknown. Penguin Books. ISBN 9780143193999.
- Adam Shoalts (2006). Sense of Adventure: An Account of a Journey in the Canadian Wilderness. Cedar Tree Press.
