= Malouin River =

Malouin
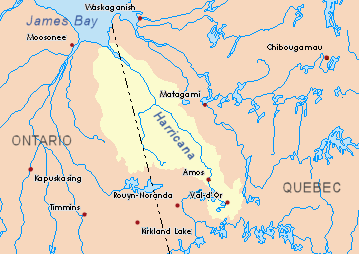
- Harricana River basin in yellow

Location
- Country: Canada
- Province: Quebec
- Region: Nord-du-Québec

Physical characteristics
- Source
  - location: Eeyou Istchee Baie-James (municipality), Nord-du-Québec, Quebec
  - coordinates: 50°11′42″N 79°18′00″W
  - elevation: 264 m (866 ft)
- Mouth: Turgeon River (Eeyou Istchee Baie-James)
  - location: Eeyou Istchee Baie-James (municipality), Nord-du-Québec, Quebec
  - coordinates: 50°42′03″N 79°19′23″W
  - elevation: 34 m (112 ft)
- Length: 67.2 km (41.8 mi)

The Malouin River is a tributary of the Harricana River, flowing into the municipality of Eeyou Istchee Baie-James (municipality), in the administrative region of Nord-du-Québec, in Quebec, in Canada. Its course crosses the townships of Massicotte and Manthet.

The surface of the river is usually frozen from early November to mid-May, however, safe ice movement is generally from mid-November to the end of April.

== Geography ==
The main hydrographic slopes near the Malouin River are:

- North side: Harricana River, Mannerelle River;
- East side: Harricana River, Breynat River, Despreux River;
- South side: Turgeon River (Eeyou Istchee James Bay), Detour River;
- West side: Again River (Ontario and Quebec), Lawagamau River (Ontario), Mannerelle River.

The Malouin River originates from a forest stream (elevation: 264 metres (866 ft)), in the southern part of the municipality of Eeyou Istchee James Bay (municipality).

The source of the Malouin River is located at:

- 21.5 kilometres (13.4 mi) West of the Harricana River;
- 56.4 kilometres (35.0 mi) South of the mouth of the Malouin River;
- 16.5 kilometres (10.3 mi) West of the Ontario border.

From its source, the Malouin River flows more or less parallel to the Ontario border over 67.2 kilometres (41.8 mi) according to the following segments:

- 25.2 kilometres (15.7 mi) North in a marsh zone, up to a bend in the river;
- 17.1 kilometres (10.6 mi) North in a marsh zone, to a creek (coming from the South-East);
- 5.6 kilometres (3.5 mi) North of the marsh zone to the confluence of the Mannerelle River;
- 19.3 kilometres (12.0 mi) North to marsh area to mouth.

The Malouin River flows on the southwestern shore of the Harricana River to:

- 32.8 kilometres (20.4 mi) upstream of Low Shoal Island (in Ontario);
- 64.3 kilometres (40.0 mi) South-East of the mouth of the Harricana River;
- 14.1 kilometres (8.8 mi) East of the Ontario border;
- 158 kilometres (98 mi) North-West of downtown Matagami.

== Toponymy ==
This hydronym evokes the work of life of the surveyor Paul Malouin (1884–1945), born in Quebec City. The latter undertook studies at the School of Surveying at Laval University in 1904. Received surveyor-surveyor in 1910, he joined the same year with the surveyor Paul Joncas under the enterprise name "Joncas and Malouin".

The designation "Malouin River" is indicated on a regional map of the Abitibi of the Department of Lands and Forests in 1962. In 1895, explorer Henry O'Sullivan named this watercourse "Rivière du Mariage" (English: The River of Marriage) or "Birthday", having discovered him on September 15, 20th anniversary day of his marriage.

The hydronym "Malouin River" was formalized on December 5, 1968, by the Commission de toponymie du Québec, i.e. at the creation of this commission.

== See also ==
- Eeyou Istchee Baie-James (municipality), a municipality
- Jamésie, a region
- Harricana River, a watercourse
- Mannerelle River, a watercourse
- James Bay, a body of water
- List of rivers of Quebec
