= Centre de services scolaire de l'Or-et-des-Bois =

Francophone school district in Quebec, Canada

The Centre de services scolaire de l'Or-et-des-Bois (CSSOB) is a Francophone school district headquartered in Val-d'Or, Quebec.

== Schools ==
Secondary:

- École secondaire La Concorde (Senneterre)
- École secondaire Le Transit (Val-d'Or)
- École secondaire Le Tremplin (Malartic)
- Polyvalente Le Carrefour (Val-d'Or)

Preschool/Primary:

- Chanoine-Delisle (Senneterre)
- Charles-René-Lalande (Rivière-Héva)
- Des Explorateurs (Malartic)
- Louis-Querbes (Cadillac)
- Notre-Dame-de-l'Assomption (Vassan)
- Notre-Dame-de-Fatima (Val-d'Or)
- Notre-Dame-du-Rosaire (Sullivan
- Papillon-d'Or (Val-d'Or) - Alternative school
- Pavillon Saint-Paul (Senneterre)
- Saint-Isidore (Val-Senneville)
- Saint-Joseph (Val-d'Or)
- Sainte-Lucie (Val-d'Or)
- Sainte-Marie (Val-d'Or)
- Saint-Philippe (Dubuisson)
- Saint-Sauveur (Val-d'Or)

== See also ==
- Western Quebec School Board which operates Anglophone schools in CSOB areas
