= Kesagami Provincial Park =

Provincial park and wilderness area in Ontario, Canada

- IUCN category Ib (wilderness area)
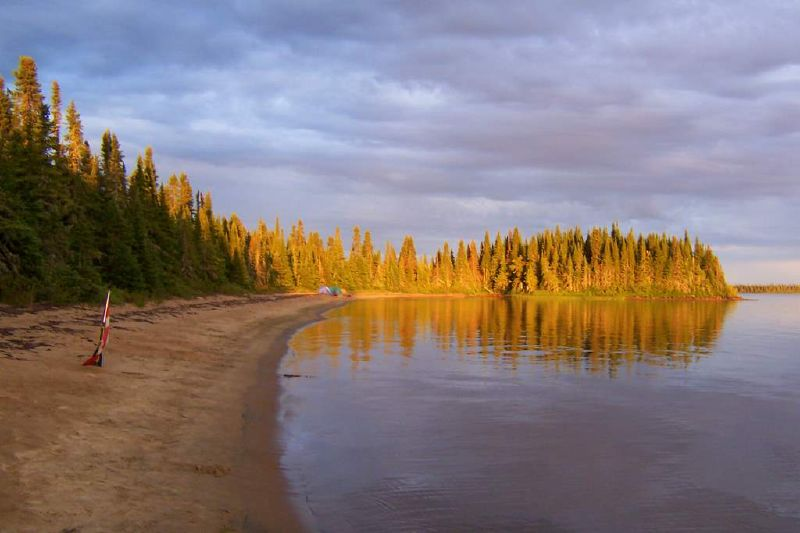
- Sunset on Kesagami Lake

- Location within Ontario
- Location: Cochrane District, Ontario, Canada
- Coordinates: 50°19′55″N 80°16′03″W
- Area: 55,977.00 ha (216.1284 sq mi)
- Designation: Wilderness
- Established: 1983
- Governing body: Ontario Parks
- Website: www.ontarioparks.com/park/kesagami

Kesagami Provincial Park is in Cochrane District of Northern Ontario, Canada. It was established in 1983 and provides backcountry canoeing, camping, and fishing opportunities. The bulk of the park consists of a large near-rectangular piece of land surrounding Kesagami Lake, as well as a linear park that protects a 200 metres (660 ft) wide strip of land on both sides of the Kesagami River from Kesagami Lake to its mouth at the Harricana River. Its name means "warm water".

The remote park, one of the most northerly in the province and just south of the tree line, is in the James Bay lowlands. Its flat, poorly drained terrain is frozen for much of the year.

Notable features of the park include historical and archeological locations, calving sites of boreal woodland caribou, the Kesagami River canoe route from Kesagami Lake to Hannah Bay, and typical flora and fauna of boreal forest. Another highlight of the park is the 20,780 hectares (51,300 acres) Kesagami Lake, unique for its size in the James Bay area. This shallow lake is renowned for its trophy pike and walleye fishing. Furthermore, the 4-metre-high (13 ft) peat cliffs along the shores of Kesagami Lake, which have been carved by the waves into bizarre forms of deep caverns and thick columns, have long been recognized as "exceptional".

It is a non-operating park, meaning that there are no facilities or services, and is only accessible via air or water. There is one commercial lodge present on Kesagami Lake.

== History ==
In 1777, the Hudson's Bay Company opened Mesackamee House, a trading post on Kesagami Lake, which was formerly also called Mesackamee or Mesackamy Lake. While the post was intended to protect business at Abitibi from competitors, it was abandoned by October 1779.

The park was established on June 7, 1983, and expanded by 1,777 hectares (4,390 acres) the following year.

== Flora and fauna ==
Its terrain is characterized by peat bogs, muskegs, and large fen-meadows. Stunted black spruce (Picea mariana) are the dominant tree species, with sporadic balsam, fir, and larch stands. Other tree species found are tamarack (Larix laricina), trembling aspen (Populus tremuloides), and white birch (Betula papyrifera)

Animals in the park include moose, woodland caribou, bear, wolf, bog lemmings, otters, and martens.

Fish species in Kesagami Lake include burbot, herring, northern pike, common white sucker and longnose sucker, perch, walleye, and lake whitefish.
