= Parc Roland-Veillet =

Park in Val-d'Or, Quebec, Canada

Roland-Veillet Park
- Parc Roland-Veillet
- Location within Quebec
- Location: Val-d'Or, Abitibi-Témiscamingue, Quebec, Canada
- Coordinates: 48°05′32″N 77°49′42″W
- Operator: City of Val-d'Or

The Rolland-Veillet Park is a public park located at the intersection of Bussières and Mercedès-Bourgeois streets, in the western part of the town of Val-d'Or, in the Regional County Municipality of La Vallée-de-l'Or Regional County Municipality, in the administrative region of Abitibi-Témiscamingue, in Quebec, in Canada.

This municipal park is intended for recreational activities.

== Toponymy ==
Arrived in Val-d'Or in 1936, Roland Veillet (1918–2001), electrician entrepreneur, founded, with Paul Gosselin, the company Veillet and Gosselin. Roland Veillet was the warden of the parish of Saint-Sauveur (Val-d'Or), from 1939 to 1946, president of the Club Richelieu, and commissioner and president of the Val-d'Or Regional School Board. The toponym "Parc Roland-Veillet" was formalized on April 26, 2011 at the Commission de toponymie du Québec.

== See also ==
Media related to Category: Rolland-Veillet park at Wikimedia Commons

- Val-d'Or
