= Lake Blouin =

Lake in Val-d'Or, Quebec, Canada

Lac Blouin
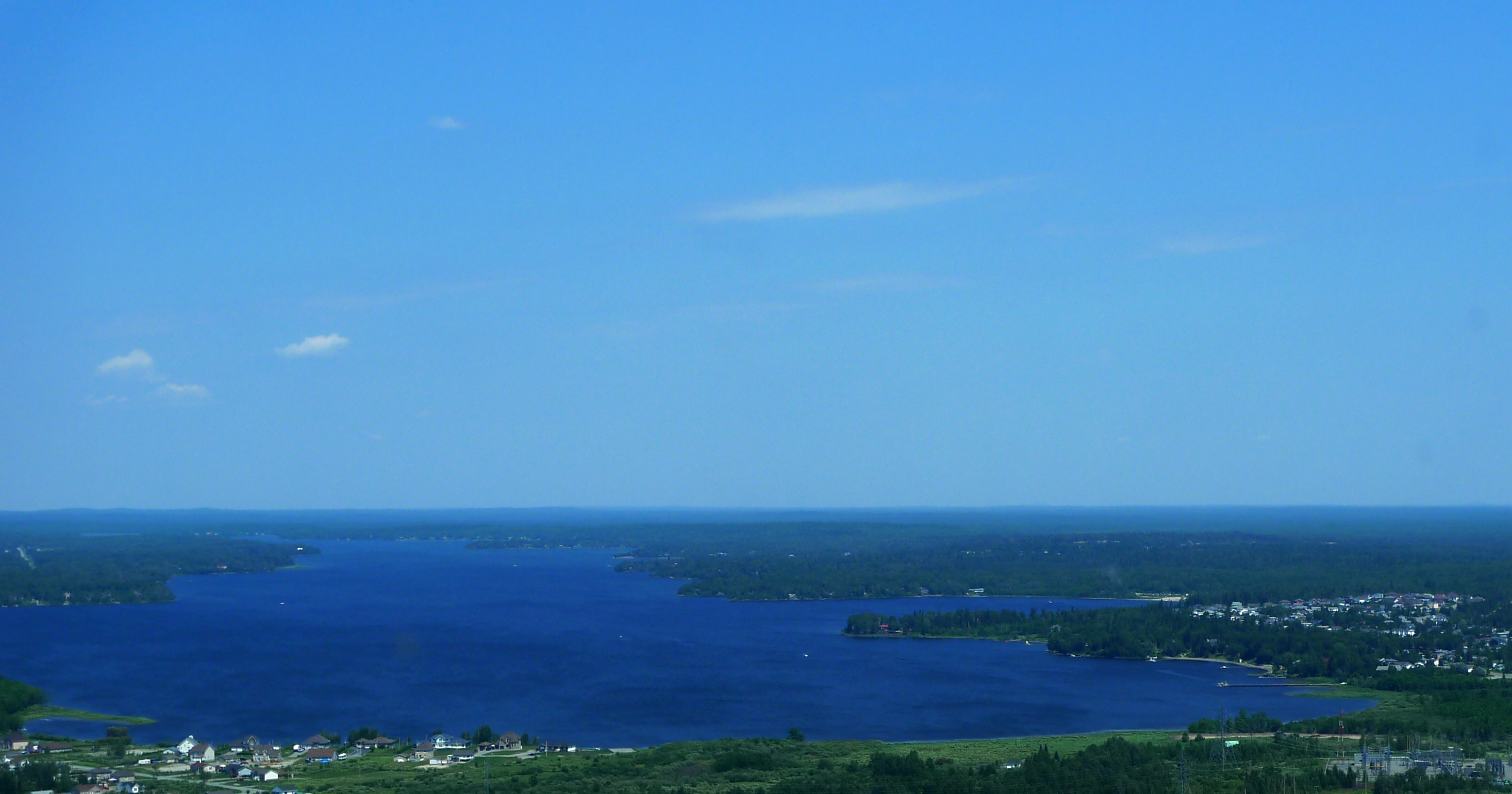
- Lake Blouin viewed from the south

- Location within Quebec
- Location: Val-d'Or, Quebec / Vallee de l'Or Regional County Municipality, Quebec
- Coordinates: 48°9′12″N 77°45′58″W
- Primary inflows: Bourlamaque River Senneville River
- Primary outflows: Harricana River
- Basin countries: Canada
- Max. length: 13.5 km (8 mi)
- Max. width: 2 km (1 mi)
- Surface area: 13 km^{2} (5.0 sq mi)
- Max. depth: 30 m (98 ft)
- Surface elevation: 304 m (997 ft)
- Settlements: Val-d'Or

Lake Blouin (French: lac Blouin) is an ellipse shaped natural fresh water lake in the Abitibi-Témiscamingue Administrative Region, Quebec, Canada. The lake, oriented on a southwest–northeast axis, measures 13.5 km (8 mi) in length and has a maximum width of 2 km (1 mi). It is relatively shallow with a maximum depth of 30 m (98 ft), and is located just north of the city of Val-d’Or, Quebec. It is fed by the Bourlamaque and Senneville rivers and is the headwater of the Harricana River. All three rivers are situated near its northeastern end. The shore of lake Blouin is lined with small rocky outcrops and sandy beaches. The lake lies within the Clay Belt, a vast tract of fairly flat land with fertile soil covering 180,000 km^{2} (69,000 sq mi) in northwest Quebec and northeast Ontario.

== Name ==
Lake Blouin takes its name from Alphonse Blouin, a surveyor for Quebec’s Ministry of Lands and Forests who made a number of journeys to the area in 1905 and 1906 . At the time, the lake was called Pakitanika which means "Lake of the Goose" in the Algonquian language.

== History ==
Lake Blouin played a key role in the development of Val-d’Or and the gold mines on which its economy is based. It was the main access route for prospectors and surveyors at the beginning of the 20th century. In the early 1920s, when a number of gold mines were starting up around what was to become Val-d’Or, Lake Blouin allowed heavy equipment required for mining operations to be transported by boat from the town of Amos. A dock was built for that purpose at the south east end of the lake in 1925. Settlers and miners also use this route to access the area.

As early as 1920, the lake was used as landing site for floatplanes providing services to the area. In 1946, a dock and fuelling station for these planes was opened on the south east shore of the lake. In 1949, a daily flight, using amphibious aircraft landing on Lake Blouin, linked Val-d’Or to Montreal.

Lake Blouin was also for a brief period used for timber rafting logs from the Val-d’Or area to the sawmill in Amos.

== Fauna ==
Fish species found in lake Blouin are: brown bullhead, yellow walleye, black walleye, Northern pike, Burbot, White sucker, Longnose Sucker, and Yellow perch.

== Culture ==
Lake Blouin is featured in a popular song by Val-d’Or native Raôul Duguay called "La bitt à Tibi".

The Rotary municipal beach on Lake Blouin is a popular summer attraction.
