= Université du Québec en Abitibi-Témiscamingue =

Public university in Quebec, Canada

Coordinates: 48°13′55″N 79°0′20″W

University of Quebec in Abitibi-Témiscamingue
- Université du Québec en Abitibi-Témiscamingue
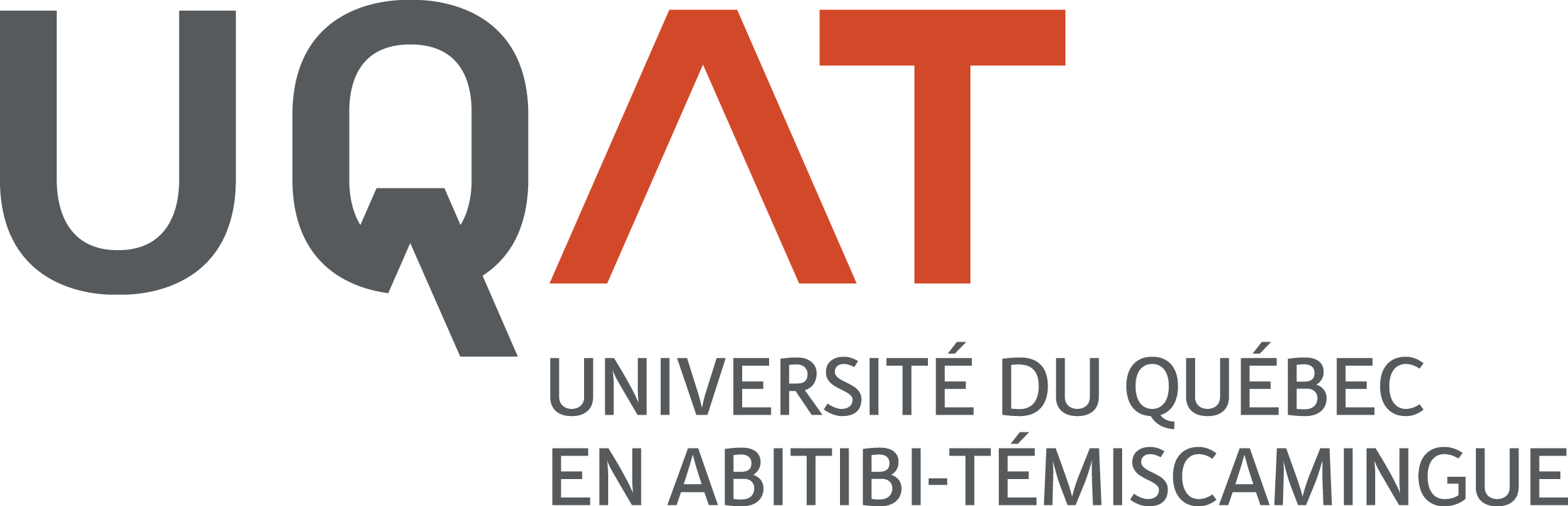
- Motto: Il faut le savoir
- Motto in English: It must be known
- Type: Constituent of the University of Quebec system
- Established: 1970 (legally 1983)
- Parent institution: Université du Québec
- Affiliations: UACC
- Students: 5,200
- Postgraduates: 708
- Location: 445, boul. de l’Université Rouyn-Noranda, Quebec, Canada
- Campus: Urban/Suburban, five campuses throughout Quebec, with campuses in Quebec City, Montreal, Laval, and Varennes
Colours
Orange and Grey
- Nickname: UQAT
- Website: www.uqat.ca

The Université du Québec en Abitibi-Témiscamingue (French pronunciation: [ynivɛʁsite dy kebɛk ɑ̃.n‿abitibi temiskamɛ̃ɡ], University of Quebec in Abitibi-Témiscamingue, UQAT) is a public university within the Université du Québec network, with campuses in Val-d'Or and Rouyn-Noranda. It takes its name from the region it primarily serves.

== Programs ==
The Université du Québec en Abitibi-Témiscamingue offers 95 programs in administration, accounting, teaching, engineering, multimedia, psychology, nursing, social work, interactive multimedia, youth communications, and art therapy. Students can choose to specialize in the disciplines of Electromechanical Engineering and Mechanical Engineering.

== History ==
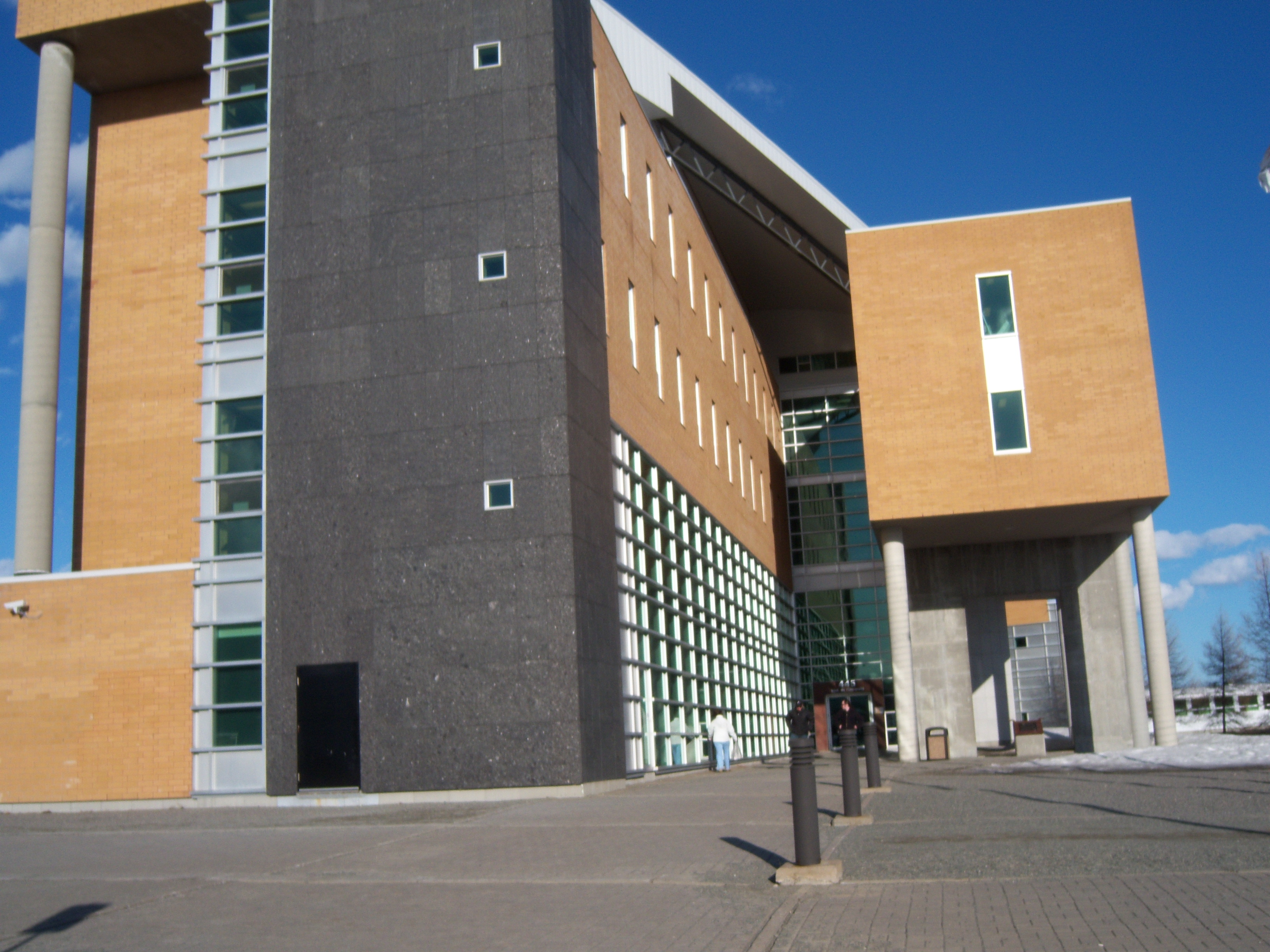
UQAT campus in Rouyn-Noranda

The Université was founded in 1970 as "Services universitaires dans le Nord-Ouest québécois". The university was subsequently renamed "Direction des études universitaires dans l’Ouest québécois" (1972), "Centre d’études universitaires dans l’Ouest québécois" (1976), and "Centre d’études universitaires en Abitibi-Témiscamingue" (1981). The university has been known as Université du Québec en Abitibi-Témiscamingue since 1983, when it split away from the administration of the Université du Québec à Trois-Rivières.

== Residences ==
On-campus residences are now available in Rouyn-Noranda and Val-d'Or. Rental accommodations are also available in these communities.

== Campuses ==
The Université du Québec en Abitibi-Témiscamingue is based in Rouyn-Noranda, Quebec. Additional satellite campuses are located in Val-d'Or (Centre d'Etude Supérieures Lucien-Cliche), which includes a pavilion for First Nations studies, and in Amos (Pavilion des Rapides), which specializes in forestry with a research centre focusing on ligniculture and silviculture, and in hydrogeology with a laboratory for groundwater research.

UQAT also has smaller learning centres in Notre-Dame-du-Nord, La Sarre, Matagami, and Duparquet.

== Notable alumni ==
Notable people who have attended the university include:

- Christine Moore – NDP politician
