= Breynat River =

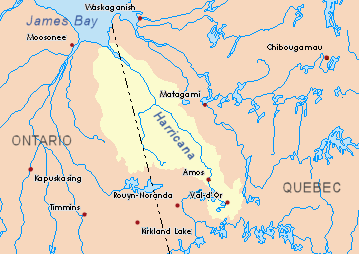
- Harricana River basin in yellow

Location
- Country: Canada
- Province: Quebec

Physical characteristics
- Source: Streams
  - location: Baie-James, Jamésie, Quebec
  - coordinates: 50°09′51″N 79°13′05″W
  - elevation: 263 m (863 ft)
- Mouth: Harricana River
  - location: Baie-James, Jamésie, Quebec
  - coordinates: 50°36′10″N 79°11′14″W
  - elevation: 44 m (144 ft)
- Length: 61.1 km (38.0 mi)

Basin features
- Tributaries
  - left: Discharge of Linda Lake, discharge of Breynat Lake.

The Breynat River is a tributary of the Harricana River in the municipality of Baie-James in the administrative region of Nord-du-Québec, in Quebec, in Canada.

The surface of the river is usually frozen from early November to mid-May, but safe circulation on the ice generally occurs from mid-November to the end of April.

== Geography ==
The main hydrographic slopes adjacent to the Breynat River are:

- North side: Harricana River, Joncas River;
- East side: Harricana River, Joncas River, Despreux River;
- South side: Turgeon River, Martigny River;
- West side: Malouin River, River Mannerelle.

The Breynat River derives its source from a forest brook (altitude: 263 metres (863 ft)), located in the Township of Martigny in the municipality of Eeyou Istchee Baie-James (Municipality), at the Northwest of "Lac aux Épices".

The source of the Breynat River is located at:

- 1.0 kilometre (0.62 mi) at the North of "Lac aux Épices" (translation: spices lake);
- 20.6 kilometres (12.8 mi) at the West of the Harricana River;
- 4.6 kilometres (2.9 mi) at the Southeast of the source of the Malouin River;
- 18.6 kilometres (11.6 mi) at the East of the Ontario border.

From the source, the Breynat River flows more or less in parallel to the Harricana River on 61.1 kilometres (38.0 mi) in the following segments:

- 0.3 kilometres (0.19 mi) at the north, to the northern limit of the township of Martigny;
- 15.4 kilometres (9.6 mi) at the north, to a stream (coming from the south);
- 10.1 kilometres (6.3 mi) at the north, to a stream (coming from the south-east);
- 4.4 kilometres (2.7 mi) at the north, to the outlet of Lake Breynat (coming from the West);
- 17.9 kilometres (11.1 mi) at the north, then turning north-east, winding at the end of the segment, to a stream (coming from the South);
- 13.0 kilometres (8.1 mi) at the north, in marsh zone, then crossing the Rapides des Roches Rouges, winding to its mouth

The Breynat River flows on the West bank of the Harricana River to:

- 5.0 kilometres (3.1 mi) downstream of "Île des Sept Milles" (translation: "Island of Seven Milles");
- 78.3 kilometres (48.7 mi) at South-East of the mouth of the Harricana River;
- 23.4 kilometres (14.5 mi) at East of the border of Ontario;
- 145.3 kilometres (90.3 mi) at the Northwest of downtown Matagami.

== Toponymy ==
The name "rivière Breynat" was officialized on December 5, 1968, at the Commission de toponymie du Québec, meanings at the time of its founding of this commission.

== See also ==
- List of rivers of Quebec
