= Val-d'Or =

- City
- Val-d'Or city

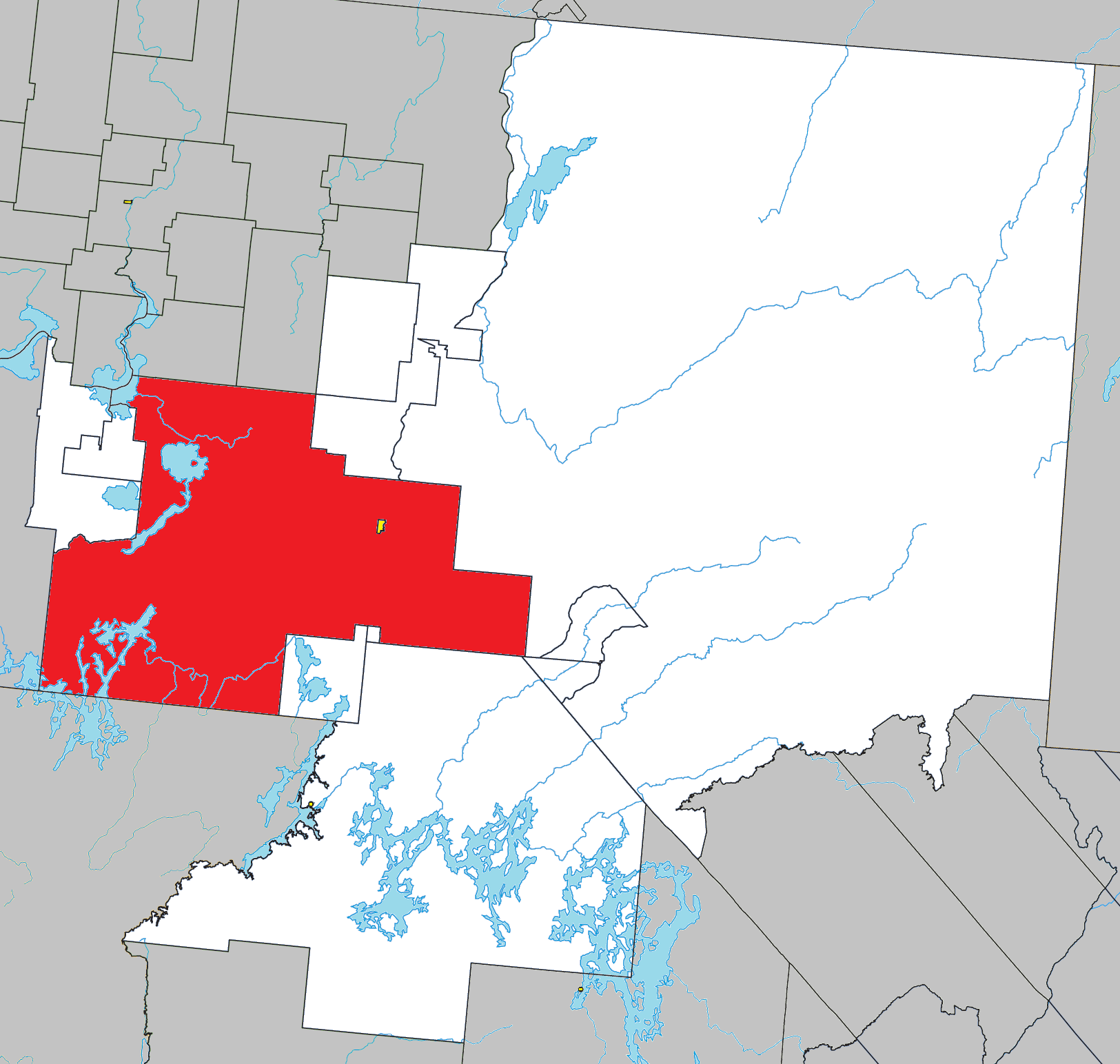
- Location within La Vallée-de-l'Or RCM

- Location in western Quebec
- Coordinates: 48°06′N 77°47′W
- Country: Canada
- Province: Quebec
- Region: Abitibi-Témiscamingue
- RCM: La Vallée-de-l'Or
- Constituted: January 1, 2002

Government
  - Mayor: Serge Allard
  - Federal riding: Abitibi—Baie-James— Nunavik—Eeyou
  - Prov. riding: Abitibi-Est

Area
  - City: 3,979.63 km^{2} (1,536.54 sq mi)
  - Land: 3,536.84 km^{2} (1,365.58 sq mi)
  - Urban: 25.17 km^{2} (9.72 sq mi)
  - Metro: 3,539.98 km^{2} (1,366.79 sq mi)
- Elevation: 306 m (1,004 ft)

Population (2021)
  - City: 32,752
  - Density: 9.3/km^{2} (24/sq mi)
  - Urban: 25,473
  - Urban density: 1,011.9/km^{2} (2,621/sq mi)
  - Metro: 34,037
  - Metro density: 9.6/km^{2} (25/sq mi)
  - Pop (2016-21): ▲0.8%
  - Dwellings: 15,884
- Time zone: UTC−05:00 (EST)
  - Summer (DST): UTC−04:00 (EDT)
- Postal code(s): J9P
- Area codes: 819/873
- Highways: R-111 R-113; R-117 (TCH) R-397
- Website: www.ville.valdor.qc.ca

Val-d'Or (/ˈvældɔːr/ VAL-dor, French: [val dɔʁ], locally [val dɑɔ̯ʁ]; meaning "Valley of Gold" or "Golden Valley") is a city in Quebec, Canada with a population of 32,752 inhabitants according to the 2021 Canadian census. The city is located in the Abitibi-Témiscamingue region near La Vérendrye Wildlife Reserve.

The Algonquin toponym of the town is Ozawaconia Odena.

== History ==
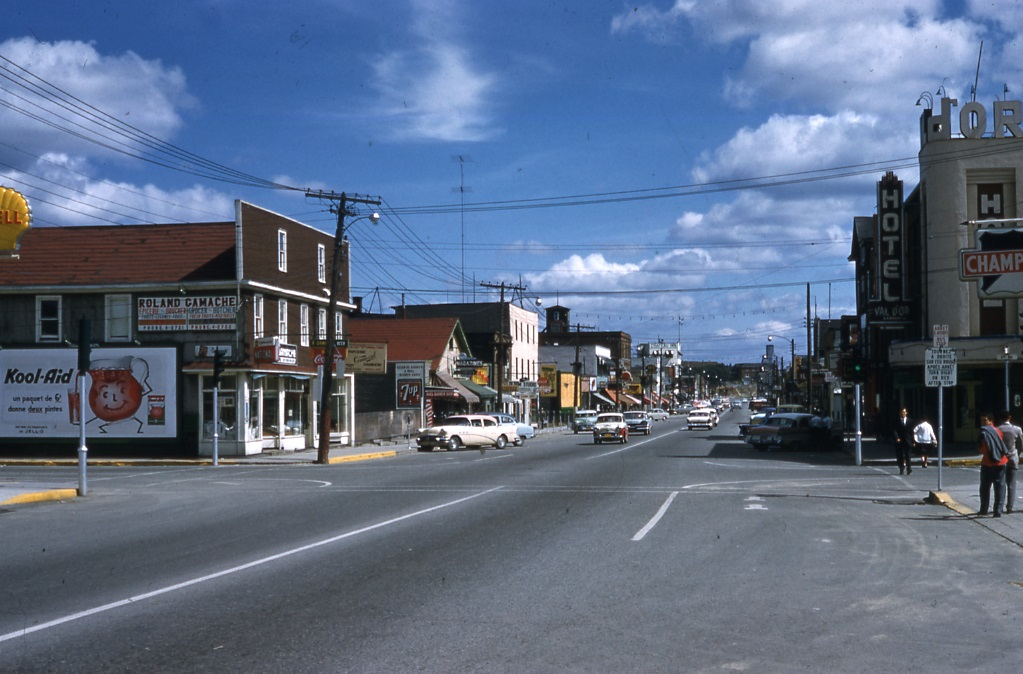
Centrale Street in Val-d'Or in 1959

Gold was discovered in the area in 1923. The name of the town is French for "Valley of Gold." While gold is still mined in the area today, base metals, such as copper (Cu), zinc (Zn), and lead (Pb) have become increasingly important resources. The ore is usually found in volcanic rocks that were deposited on the sea floor over 2.7 billion years ago. They are referred to as volcanic-hosted (or volcanogenic) massive sulphide deposits (VMS).

The city is known for its vast parks, cycle tracks, and forests. Some other attractions include the City of Gold and the mining village of Bourlamaque, which were officially proclaimed historic sites in 1979.

The city hosted the Quebec Games in 1987. The local hockey team, the Val-d'Or Foreurs, have played in the QMJHL since 1993, winning the league championship in 1998, 2001 and 2014 to claim a spot in the Memorial Cup. They play at Centre Air Creebec. The Foreurs' mascot is called Dynamit, named after dynamite which was extensively used by the mining industry of Val-d'Or.

Val-d'Or was once home to CFS Val-d'Or, a Canadian Forces Station.

In the municipal reorganizations of January 1, 2002, Val-d'Or was merged with the neighbouring municipalities of Dubuisson, Sullivan, Val-Senneville and Vassan.

The Radio-Canada investigative television program, Enquête, revealed in October 2015 numerous allegations of assault and sexual abuse of local aboriginal women by members of the provincial police, the Sûreté du Québec. The news propelled the town into the national spotlight, causing Québec's Public Safety Minister, Lise Thériault, to suspend the officers and launch an independent investigation led by the Montréal police force.

== Geography ==
Val-d'Or is situated on the Canadian Shield at an elevation of 1100 feet (330m) above sea level. Although its name refers to a valley ("Val"), the city is actually situated on a vast, slightly undulating plain.

Val-d'Or is at the heart of a vast hydrographic network which includes to the north Lake Blouin, the head water of the Harricana River and to the south Baie Carrière, a reservoir which feeds the Ottawa River.

=== Climate ===
Val-d'Or has a humid continental climate (Köppen Climate Classification Dfb), closely bordering on a subarctic climate (Dfc) with warm, humid summers and severely cold winters. Winters are snowy with a January mean of −17.4 °C (0.7 °F). There are 18.4 days where the temperature will fall below −30 °C (−22.0 °F) although with the wind chill factored in, it can occasionally drop below −40 °C (−40.0 °F). Snowfall totals are heavy, averaging 288 centimetres (113 in) with reliable snow cover from November to April. Summers are warm with a July daily high of 23.7 °C (74.7 °F) though highs reach above 30.0 °C (86.0 °F) an average of 4.3 days per year. Val-d'Or receives 905 millimetres (36 in) of precipitation per year which is fairly evenly distributed throughout the year, though precipitation is heaviest during the warmest months. Val-d'Or receives 1853 hours of sunshine per or about 39.5 of possible daylight hours, ranging from a low of 19.2% in November to a high of 52.9% in July.

Climate data for Val-d'Or (1981−2010)
Month	Jan	Feb	Mar	Apr	May	Jun	Jul	Aug	Sep	Oct	Nov	Dec	Year
Record high humidex	10.6	11.9	17.9	29.0	39.3	46.0	47.9	41.5	39.9	31.5	20.8	16.2	47.9
Record high °C (°F)	9.7 (49.5)	12.3 (54.1)	25.0 (77.0)	28.2 (82.8)	32.8 (91.0)	34.0 (93.2)	36.1 (97.0)	36.1 (97.0)	32.2 (90.0)	26.1 (79.0)	18.3 (64.9)	13.7 (56.7)	36.1 (97.0)
Mean daily maximum °C (°F)	−10.9 (12.4)	−7.9 (17.8)	−1.5 (29.3)	7.2 (45.0)	15.9 (60.6)	21.1 (70.0)	23.7 (74.7)	21.9 (71.4)	16.0 (60.8)	8.9 (48.0)	0.2 (32.4)	−7.0 (19.4)	7.3 (45.1)
Daily mean °C (°F)	−17.4 (0.7)	−14.7 (5.5)	−8.1 (17.4)	1.4 (34.5)	9.2 (48.6)	14.6 (58.3)	17.5 (63.5)	15.9 (60.6)	10.5 (50.9)	4.4 (39.9)	−4.1 (24.6)	−12.5 (9.5)	1.4 (34.5)
Mean daily minimum °C (°F)	−23.9 (−11.0)	−21.4 (−6.5)	−14.7 (5.5)	−4.5 (23.9)	2.5 (36.5)	7.9 (46.2)	11.3 (52.3)	9.8 (49.6)	5.0 (41.0)	−0.2 (31.6)	−8.3 (17.1)	−18.0 (−0.4)	−4.5 (23.9)
Record low °C (°F)	−43.9 (−47.0)	−42.2 (−44.0)	−36.1 (−33.0)	−26.1 (−15.0)	−11.1 (12.0)	−3.9 (25.0)	−0.1 (31.8)	−2.8 (27.0)	−6.2 (20.8)	−13.3 (8.1)	−30.0 (−22.0)	−40.6 (−41.1)	−43.9 (−47.0)
Record low wind chill	−55.2	−53.5	−47.2	−32.8	−18.7	−9.2	0.0	−2.9	−10.0	−18.3	−36.0	−50.1	−55.2
Average precipitation mm (inches)	51.7 (2.04)	39.3 (1.55)	58.6 (2.31)	66.4 (2.61)	85.1 (3.35)	90.4 (3.56)	97.4 (3.83)	93.5 (3.68)	94.8 (3.73)	83.7 (3.30)	83.9 (3.30)	60.4 (2.38)	905.1 (35.63)
Average rainfall mm (inches)	5.6 (0.22)	4.2 (0.17)	16.5 (0.65)	35.3 (1.39)	82.3 (3.24)	90.3 (3.56)	97.4 (3.83)	93.5 (3.68)	93.3 (3.67)	70.8 (2.79)	40.9 (1.61)	9.4 (0.37)	639.4 (25.17)
Average snowfall cm (inches)	52.2 (20.6)	39.6 (15.6)	44.3 (17.4)	29.9 (11.8)	2.6 (1.0)	0.07 (0.03)	0.0 (0.0)	0.0 (0.0)	1.5 (0.6)	12.6 (5.0)	46.6 (18.3)	58.8 (23.1)	288.1 (113.4)
Average precipitation days (≥ 0.2 mm)	18.3	15.6	14.4	13.8	14.3	14.4	15.1	14.5	16.6	17.8	20.6	21.4	196.8
Average rainy days (≥ 0.2 mm)	2.1	1.5	4.0	8.9	13.7	14.4	15.3	14.4	16.6	13.8	7.7	2.7	115.1
Average snowy days (≥ 0.2 cm)	18.2	14.9	12.6	8.3	1.7	0.27	0.0	0.0	1.0	6.9	16.3	20.9	101.0
Mean monthly sunshine hours	86.5	124.4	162.3	177.8	220.7	243.0	255.9	227.2	139.9	99.0	53.7	62.9	1,853.4
Percentage possible sunshine	31.5	43.3	44.1	43.5	47.0	50.7	52.9	51.3	37.0	29.4	19.2	24.0	39.5
Source: Environment Canada

== Demographics ==
In the 2021 Census of Population conducted by Statistics Canada, Val-d'Or had a population of 32,752 living in 15,033 of its 15,884 total private dwellings, a change of 0.8% from its 2016 population of 32,491. With a land area of 3,536.84 km^{2} (1,365.58 sq mi), it had a population density of 9.3/km^{2} (24.0/sq mi) in 2021.

Canada census – Val-d'Or community profile

	2021	2016
Population	32,752 (+0.8% from 2016)	32,491 (+2.0% from 2011)
Land area	3,536.84 km^{2} (1,365.58 sq mi)	3,550.70 km^{2} (1,370.93 sq mi)
Population density	9.3/km^{2} (24/sq mi)	9.2/km^{2} (24/sq mi)
Median age	43.2 (M: 42.0, F: 44.0)	42.5 (M: 41.4, F: 43.8)
Private dwellings	15,884 (total) 15,033 (occupied)	15,352 (total) 14,565 (occupied)
Median household income	$75,500	$64,864

References: 2021 2016

Historical census populations – Val-d'Or

Year	Pop.	±%
1941	4,385	—
1951	8,685	+98.1%
1956	9,876	+13.7%
1961	10,983	+11.2%
1966	12,147	+10.6%
1971	17,421	+43.4%

Year	Pop.	±%
1976	19,915	+14.3%
1981	21,371	+7.3%
1986	22,252	+4.1%
1991	23,842	+7.1%
1996	24,285	+1.9%
2001	22,748	−6.3%

Year	Pop.	±%
2006	31,123	+36.8%
2011	31,862	+2.4%
2016	32,491	+2.0%
2021	32,752	+0.8%

Population counts are not adjusted for boundary changes.
Source: Statistics Canada

Mother Tongue (2021):

- English: 2.6%
- French: 93.3%
- English and French: 1.1%
- Other only: 2.4%

== Economy ==
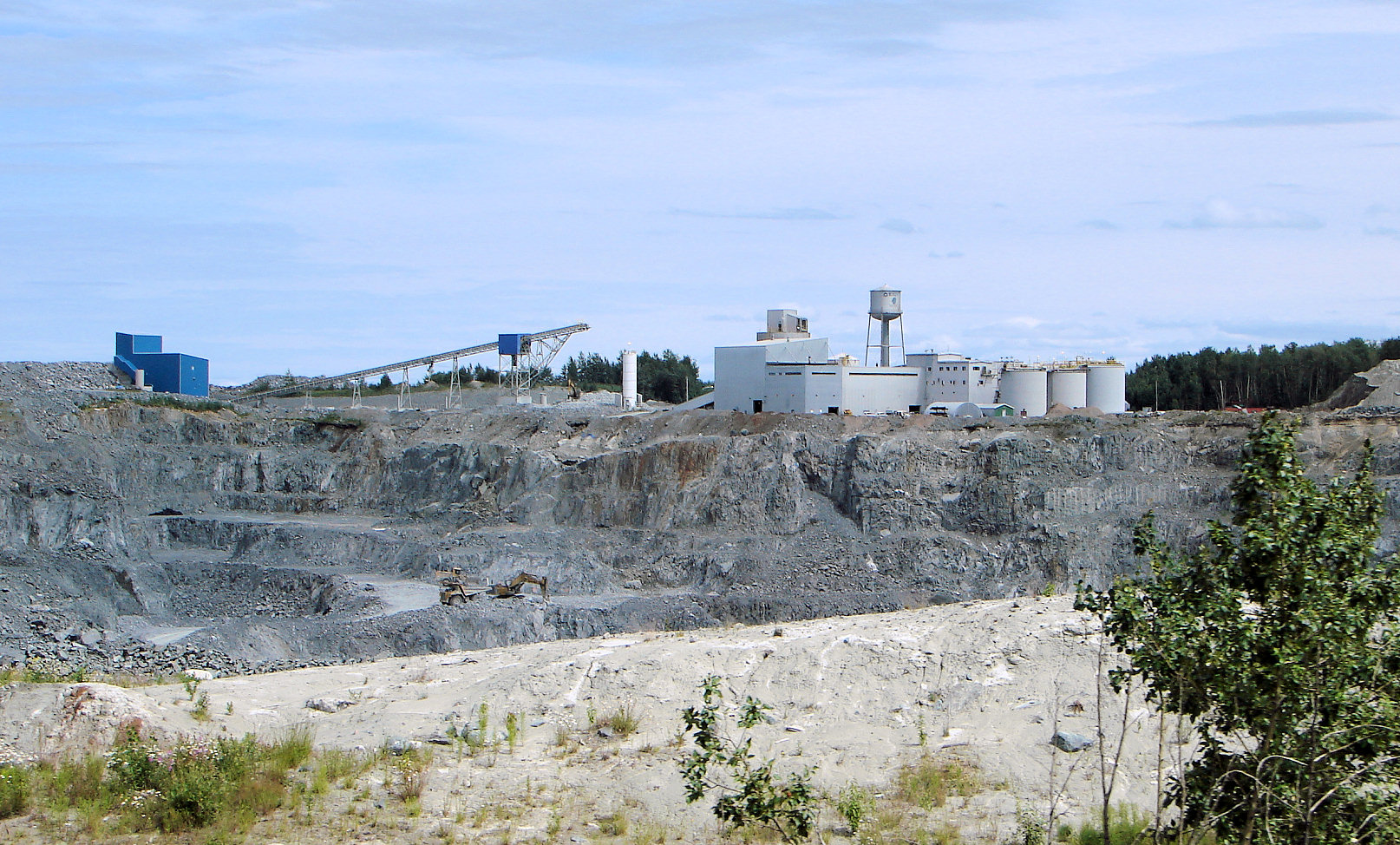
Open pit mine in Val-d'Or. Mining forms a major part of its economy.

Air Creebec, a regional airline, has its headquarters in Val-d'Or and the Val-d'Or Airport serves as its hub.

Val-d'Or's proximity to the Abitibi gold belt has made it a large gold producer, being part of a region that produced 45 million ounces of gold since the 1930s.

In 2012, Quebec Lithium Corp. re-opened a lithium mine which had operated as an underground mine from 1955–65, planning to carve an open pit mine over pegmatite dikes. the mine is about 60 kilometres (37 mi) north of Val-d'Or, 38 kilometres (24 mi) southeast of Amos, and 15 kilometres (9.3 mi) km west of Barraute. Access to the mine is via paved road from Val-d'Or.

A Canadian National line passes through the community. The Val-d'Or station formerly served Canadian National and Via Rail passenger trains.

Transit and paratransit services within Val-d'Or are provided by a contractor. Intercity bus service from and to Val-d'Or is provided by Autobus Maheux.

== Government ==
City council (as of 2026):

- Mayor: Serge Allard
- Councillors: Marc Boulianne, Dave Tremblay, Valérie Dufour, Maryse Ouellet, Cathy Elliott Morneau, Frédéric Vincent, Jean St-Jules, Sylvie Hébert.

List of former mayors since 2002 amalgamation:

- Fernand Trahan (2002–2013)
- Pierre Corbeil (2013–2021)
- Céline Brindamour (2021–2025)
- Serge Allard (2025-present)

== Education ==
The Centre de services scolaire de l'Or-et-des-Bois operates French-language public schools, while the Western Quebec School Board operates English-language public schools.

The city also hosts campuses of Cégep de l'Abitibi-Témiscamingue and of UQAT.

== Media ==
Almost all media in Val-d'Or and the nearby city of Rouyn-Noranda serves both cities. Although the cities are far enough apart that radio and television stations in the area serve the cities from separate transmitters, almost every broadcast station in either city has a rebroadcaster in the other city. The only nominal exceptions are the cities' separate Énergie stations, although at present even these stations share the majority of their broadcast schedule.

== Notable people ==
- Yolette Lévy (1938–2018), Haitian-born Canadian politician and activist
- Serge Aubin, hockey player
- Dany Bédar, musician and singer
- Pierre Brassard, actor and comedian
- Lucien Cliche, politician
- Boom Desjardins, singer
- Raôul Duguay, singer and poet
- Sophie Dupuis, director
- Robin L'Houmeau, actor
- Anthony Mantha, hockey player
- Dany Sabourin, hockey player
- Diane Tell, singer
- Pierre Yergeau, writer

== See also ==
- Parc Roland-Veillet, a public park
- List of towns in Quebec
