= Detour River =

Detour
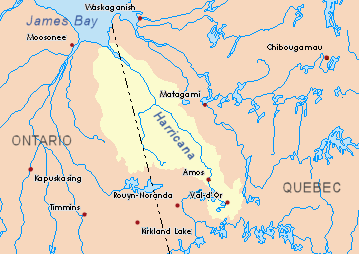
- Harricana River basin in yellow

Location
- Country: Canada
- Provinces: Ontario; Quebec
- District: Cochrane

Physical characteristics
- Source: Turgeon Lake
  - location: Eeyou Istchee Baie-James (municipality), Nord-du-Québec, Quebec
  - coordinates: 49°43′44″N 79°51′39″W
  - elevation: 313 m (1,027 ft)
- Mouth: Turgeon River
  - location: Eeyou Istchee Baie-James (municipalité), Quebec
  - coordinates: 49°56′20″N 79°25′30″W
  - elevation: 246 m (807 ft)
- Length: 80.0 km (49.7 mi)

Basin features
- Tributaries
  - left: (from de mouth) Bourgeois creek, Dugas creek, Little Detour River

The Detour River is a tributary of the Turgeon River, which flows in Canada through the administrative regions of:

- Northeastern Ontario, in Cochrane District;
- Nord-du-Québec, in the municipality of Eeyou Istchee Baie-James (municipality), in the administrative region of Nord-du-Québec, in Québec.

== Geography ==
The hydrographic slopes adjacent to the Detour River are:

- North side: Lawagamau River (Ontario), Malouin River (Quebec);
- East side: Turgeon River (Quebec);
- Southern side: Chabbie River (Ontario), Little Turcotte River (Ontario), Turgeon River (Quebec and Ontario);
- West side: Lawagamau River (Ontario).

The Detour River originates in Northeastern Ontario, at the mouth of the "Upper Lake Detour" (length: 2.4 kilometres (1.5 mi), elevation: 314 metres (1,030 ft)), southeast of the lake Lawagamau, east of the Chabbie River and north of "North Chabbie Lake". The "Upper Detour Lake" has three parts bounded by peninsulas. Its mouth is situated on the eastern shore of the northern part of the lake.

River course in Northeastern Ontario

From "Upper Detour Lake", the Detour River flows:

- 5.5 kilometres (3.4 mi) to the north by collecting the waters of six streams;
- 8.0 kilometres (5.0 mi) to the east, to a stream from the south;
- 5.2 kilometres (3.2 mi) to the north;
- 4.0 kilometres (2.5 mi) to east to Monaghan Lake landfill (length: 2.4 kilometres (1.5 mi), elevation: 275 metres (902 ft));
- 22.0 kilometres (13.7 mi) to northeast, along the eastern shore of Detour Lake (length: 4.0 kilometres (2.5 mi); elevation: 266 metres (873 ft)) where the river will be discharged at the tip of a point the northeast shore, in the marsh area. This lake receives the waters of five surrounding lakes, through four landfills. The current crosses the river to the north for about 350 metres (1,150 ft). Then the current branches off towards the east where the river resumes its course;
- 13.9 kilometres (8.6 mi) southeast to the west shore of Lower Detour Lake (length: 5.5 kilometres (3.4 mi); width: 2 kilometres (1.2 mi); altitude: 252 metres (827 ft)). This lake receives from the north the waters of Stake Lake (altitude: 252 metres (827 ft)) and two lakes to the south;
- 11.6 kilometres (7.2 mi) to the east, then to the south, through marsh areas, to the Quebec border.

Course of the river in Northeast of Quebec

From the Quebec - Ontario border, the Detour River flows 9.8 kilometres (6.1 mi) eastward to the Turgeon River. In this segment of Quebec, the Detour River collects the waters of:

- "Sunday Creek" (Ontario) from the north, draining the waters of several Ontario lakes including Kitchin Lake (elevation 262 metres (860 ft)), Sunday Lake (elevation 257 metres (843 ft)) et Auger Lake (elevation: 252 metres (827 ft)) in Quebec;
- the discharge of lake Lambert (Quebec) (coming from the south) which is 2.5 kilometres (1.6 mi) long;
- the discharge of Lac Geoffrion (3.2 kilometres (2.0 mi) long, elevation: 282 metres (925 ft)), which drains upstream the waters of the Quebec lakes Grady (altitude: 260 metres (850 ft), Lavoie (altitude: 255 metres (837 ft)) and Carrier (altitude: 256 metres (840 ft)). The upper part of this branch drains wetlands in Ontario;
- unloading of an unnamed lake (from the north).

The mouth of the Detour River flows into the Turgeon River at 52 kilometres (32 mi) upstream of its confluence.

== Toponymy ==
The following place names are interrelated: Upper Detour Lake, Little Detour Lake, Detour Lake, Lower Detour Lake and Detour River.

The place name Detour River (or "rivière de Détour", in French) was officially registered on December 5, 1968, at the Bank of Place Names of the Commission de toponymie du Québec.

== See also ==
- Turgeon River, a watercourse
- Harricana River, a watercourse
- James Bay, a body of water
- Eeyou Istchee Baie-James
- List of rivers of Quebec
- List of rivers of Ontario
