= Kesagami Lake =

Lake in Ontario, Canada

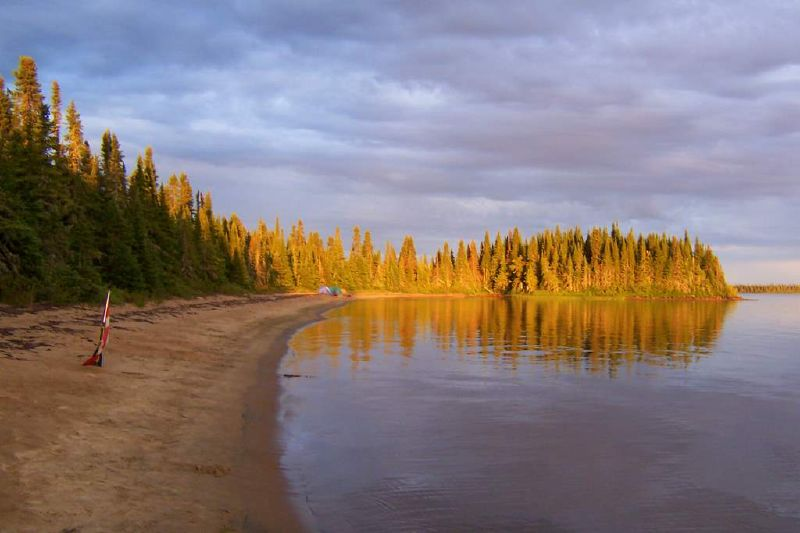

- Location within Ontario
- Location: Ontario
- Coordinates: 50.375°N 80.240°W
- Primary inflows: Kesagami River
- Primary outflows: Kesagami River
- Basin countries: Canada
- Max. length: 37 km (23 mi)
- Max. width: 11 km (7 mi)
- Surface area: 207.80 km^{2} (80.23 sq mi)
- Average depth: 2 m (6 ft 7 in)
- Max. depth: 6 m (20 ft)
- Islands: 6

Kesagami Lake is a lake of Cochrane District, in Northeastern Ontario, in Canada. It is a shallow lake that was formed assumedly by glacial erosion and unique for its size in the James Bay area. Entirely protected within Kesagami Provincial Park, it is notable in particular for its trophy pike and walleye fishing.

The lake, formerly also called Mesackamee or Mesackamy Lake, was home to a Hudson's Bay Company trading post, called Mesackamee House, between 1777 and 1780. George Atkinson, Peter Liske, William Thomas, and William Robinson were sent there from Moose Factory along with two indigenous families to settle the area in order to protect business at Abitibi from competitors. The post was abandoned by October 1779.

Fish species in Kesagami Lake include burbot, herring, northern pike, common white sucker and longnose sucker, perch, walleye, and lake whitefish.

== Description ==
The lake is irregularly shaped with some long and large bays; from its wide open northern portion three large bays stretch off to the south, including Opimiskau Bay, which measures about 8.0 by 6.4 kilometres (5 by 4 mi), and Newnham Bay, that is 37 kilometres (23 mi) long. Three short bays extend to the north. The Kesagami River enters the most eastern of the large southern bays (Newnham Bay) and flows out by the most eastern of the small northern bays (Kochichi Bay). With shores unprotected either by large forests or significant hills, the lake is exposed to the continual sweep of storms from James Bay.

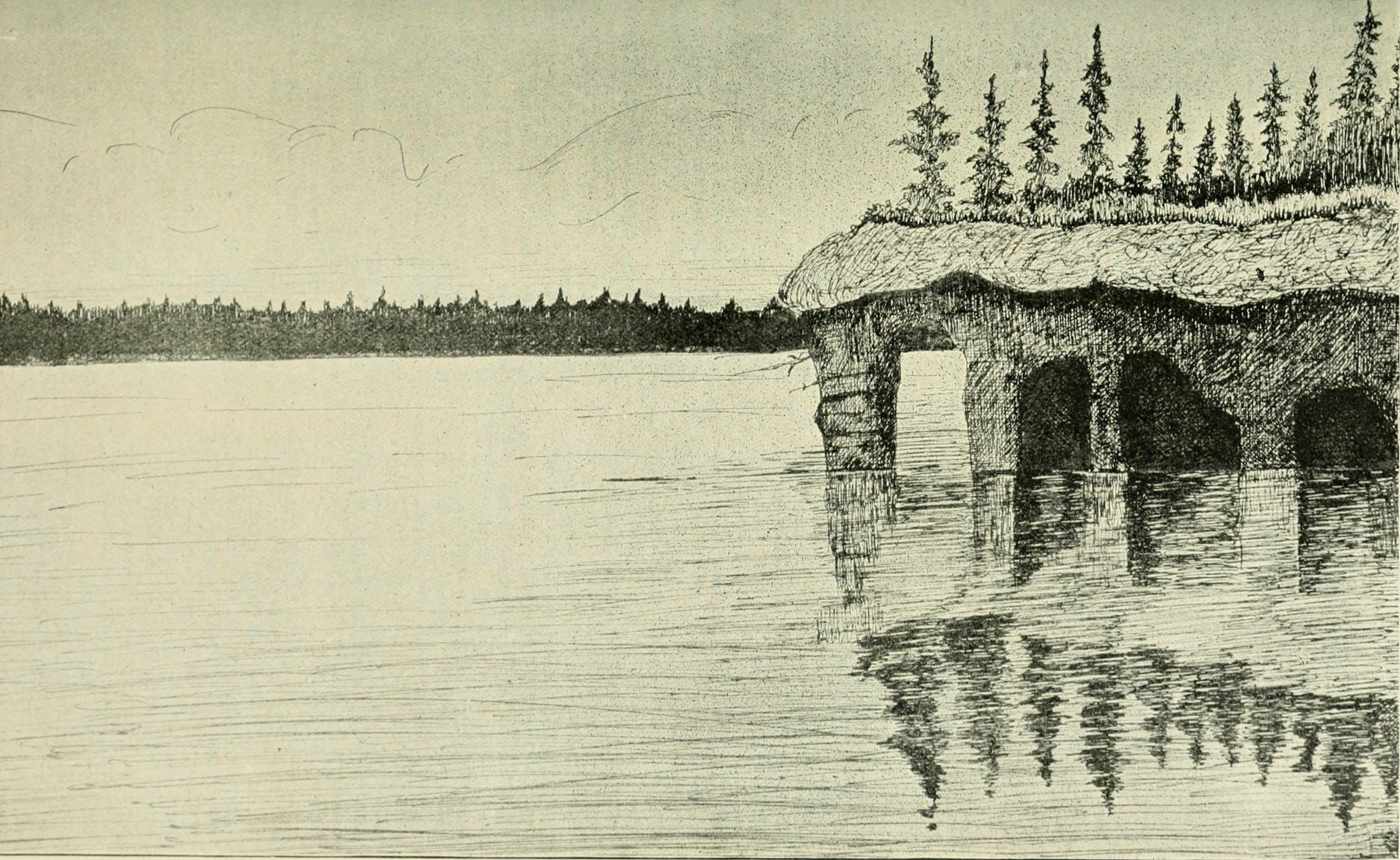
Sketch of the peat cliffs of Kesagami Lake

Its shores are almost entirely surrounded by peat cliffs which have long been recognized as "exceptional". These cliffs, that comprise not only the shores of the mainland but also those of the main islands, rise above the water sometimes only a few feet, but are often 3.7 to 4.3 m (12 to 14 ft) in height. The dash of waves on the soft, spongy material has worn away the banks to a marked degree, forming along the waterfront bizarre forms of overhanging cliffs, deep caves, caverns, thick columns, and pillars. From time to time huge sections of these cliffs fall off, and are soon worn to a black powder, which is washed up and down by the surf along the shore. At many locations along the shore where peat beds do not appear, only sphagnum grows. The surrounding terrain area is flat, poorly drained and dominated by peat bogs, muskegs and large fen-meadows.

The exposed points, such as those between the bays, are long, narrow gravel spits from which all the peat has been removed. Many of the smaller points, as well as a portion of the eastern coast south of the lake's outlet, are heaped with large rolled gallet. The bays often have narrow sand beaches bordering the shore, covering the base of the peat cliffs. At a few points the stratum beneath the peat is exposed, and is composed of a hard dense, almost boulderless bluish clay, evidently glacial.

== See also ==
- List of lakes in Ontario
