= Kesagami River =

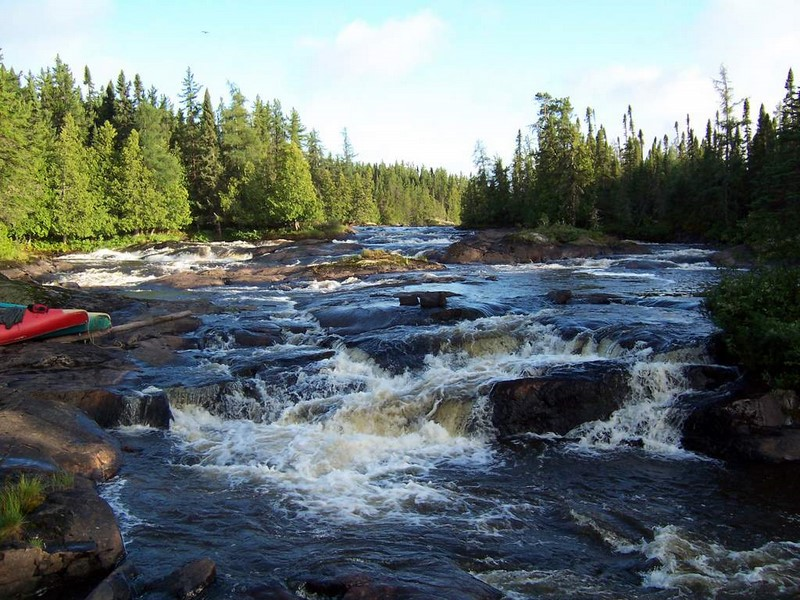

- Location of the mouth of the Kesagami River in Ontario

Location
- Country: Canada
- Province: Ontario
- Region: Northeastern Ontario
- District: Cochrane

Physical characteristics
- Source: Unnamed lake
  - coordinates: 49°40′49″N 80°20′02″W
  - elevation: 300 m (980 ft)
- Mouth: Harricana River
  - coordinates: 51°08′54″N 79°46′46″W
  - elevation: 1 m (3 ft 3 in)

Basin features
- River system: James Bay drainage basin
- Tributaries
  - left: Bodell River
  - right: Lawagamau River, Seal River, Little Seal River, Shashiskau River, Little Kesagami River

The Kesagami River is a river in northern Cochrane District in Northeastern Ontario, Canada. It is part of the James Bay drainage basin, and is a left tributary of the Harricana River. The lower two-thirds of the river, from about Kesagami Lake and downstream for 112 kilometres (70 mi) to its mouth, are part of Kesagami Provincial Park.

== Geography ==
The river begins at an unnamed lake in the Abitibi Uplands just west of Ontario Highway 652 and flows north to the large Kesagami Lake. It exits the lake at the northeast, continues north and descends rapidly to the James Bay Lowlands, where it takes in several tributaries before reaching its mouth at the Harricana River, just upstream of that river's mouth at James Bay.

From Kesagami Lake downstream, the river can be traversed as a canoe route. Since the river drops 250 metres (820 ft) over 112 kilometres (70 mi) to its mouth, whitewater canoeing is challenging, and extreme during spring conditions.

The entire course of the Kesagami River lies within the Hudson (James) Bay Lowland and, like all other streams in that region, it flows with a swift current in a channel cut through the marine clay deposits overlying limestone rocks of Paleozoic age. The banks are generally steep. The thickness of the overburden diminishes as the river nears its mouth, and in places it flows over beds of horizontal limestone. The Kesagami has few tributaries, and these are small because of the impervious nature of the clay through which they run.

The greater part of its course, which is generally in a north-northeast direction, is through a muskeg country with mostly dwarf black spruce and tamarack trees. Second-growth timber consists chiefly of Banksian pine, poplar, and birch. Owing to the amount of moisture in the ground, trees in this region do not attain a greater average height than about 9.1 metres (30 ft), and have a maximum diameter of 10 to 13 centimetres (4 to 5 in) in a growing period of between 100 and 150 years.

=== Tributaries ===
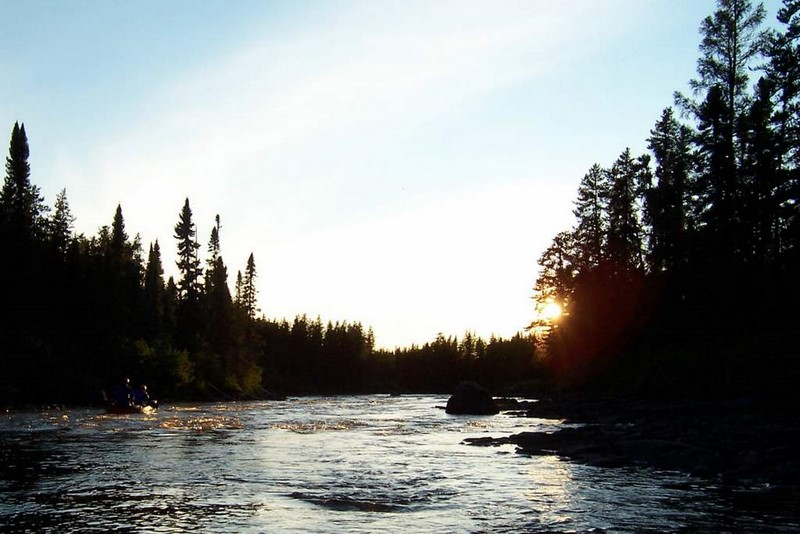
Kesagami River

- Shonaniwau Creek (left)
- Kapichilewau Creek (left)
- Lawagamau River (right)
- Kwastigam Creek (left)
- Kachigaskotik Creek (left)
- Seal River (right)
- Little Seal River (right)
- Shashiskau River (right)
- Bodell River (left)
- Kesagami Lake
  - Wikweyau Creek (right)
- Little Kesagami River (right)

== See also ==
- List of rivers of Ontario

== Sources ==
- Map 15 (PDF) (Map). 1 : 1,600,000. Official road map of Ontario. Ministry of Transportation of Ontario. 2014.
- Restructured municipalities - Ontario map #3 (Map). Restructuring Maps of Ontario. Ontario Ministry of Municipal Affairs and Housing. 2006. Archived from the original on 2014-04-10.
