= Lawagamau River =

Lawagamau River Kattawagami River
- Location of the mouth of the Lawagamau River in Ontario

Location
- Country: Canada
- Province: Ontario
- Region: Northeastern Ontario
- District: Cochrane

Physical characteristics
- Source: Upper Lawagamau Lake
  - coordinates: 49°44′16″N 79°59′28″W
  - elevation: 304 m (997 ft)
- Mouth: Kesagami River
  - coordinates: 51°03′57″N 79°43′55″W
  - elevation: 1 m (3 ft 3 in)

Basin features
- River system: James Bay drainage basin
- Tributaries
  - left: Hoelke Creek
  - right: Hopper Creek

The Lawagamau River, also known as the Kattawagami River, is a river in northern Cochrane District in Northeastern Ontario, Canada. It is part of the James Bay drainage basin, and is a right tributary of the Kesagami River.

The river begins at Upper Lawagamau Lake and heads north through Lawagamau Lake and under Ontario Highway 652. It turns northeast then east, takes in the right tributary Hopper Creek, then once again heads north. The river takes in the left tributary Hoelke Creek, and reaches its mouth at the Kesagami River. The Kesagami River flows via the Harricana River to James Bay.

== Tributaries ==
- Hoelke Creek (left)
- Hopper Creek (right)

== See also ==
- List of rivers of Ontario

== Sources ==
- Map 15 (PDF) (Map). 1 : 1,600,000. Official road map of Ontario. Ministry of Transportation of Ontario. 2014.
- Restructured municipalities - Ontario map #3 (Map). Restructuring Maps of Ontario. Ontario Ministry of Municipal Affairs and Housing. 2006. Archived from the original on 2014-04-10.
