= Harricana River =

River in Quebec and Ontario, Canada

Harricana
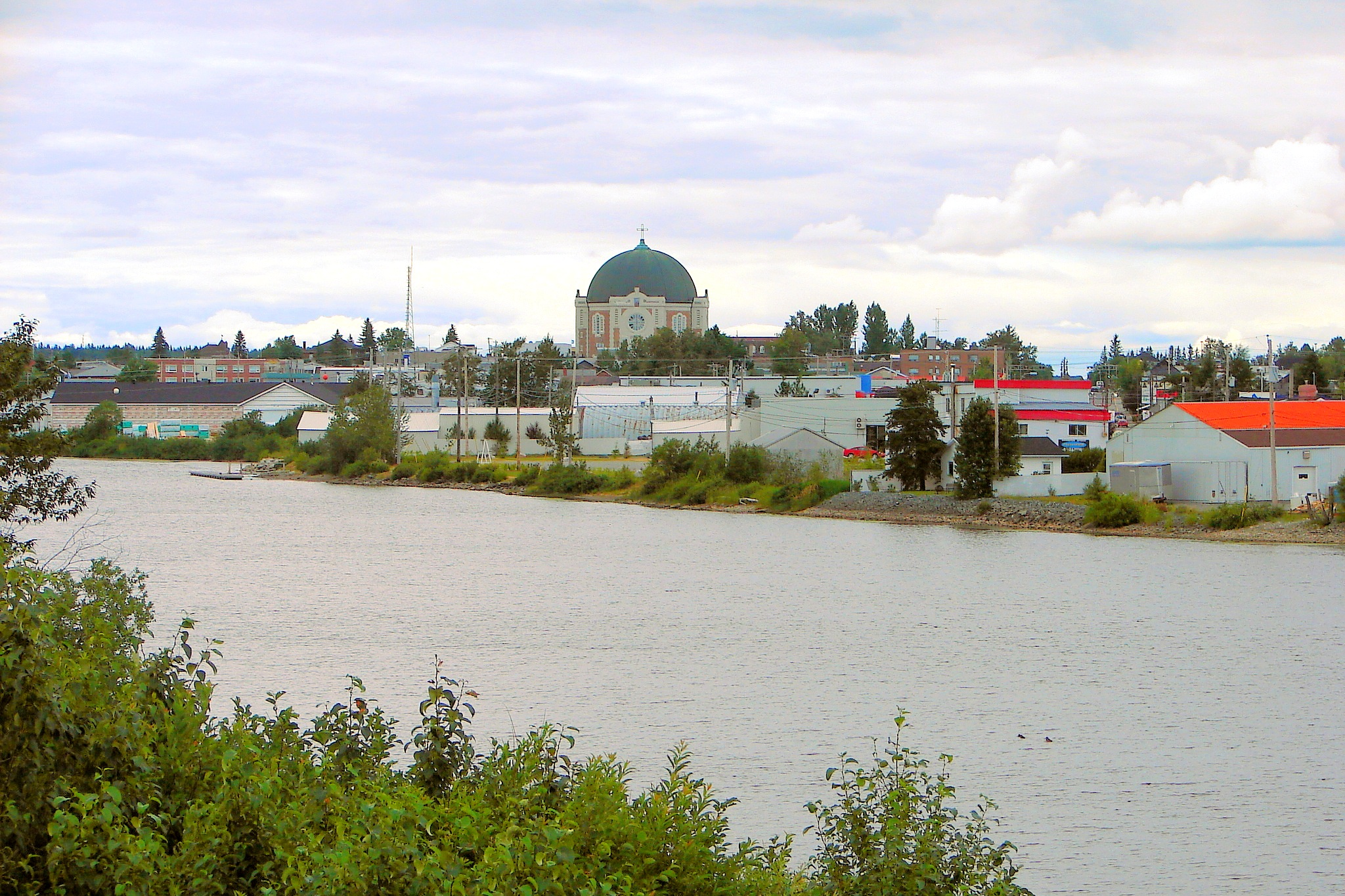
- The Harricana River in Amos

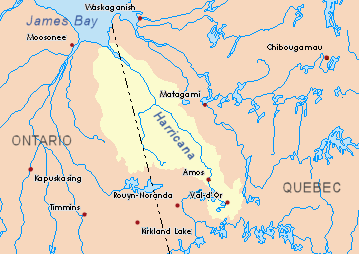
- Harricana River basin in yellow

Location
- Country: Canada
- Provinces: Quebec; Ontario

Physical characteristics
- Source: Lake Blouin
  - location: Val-d'Or, Jamésie, Quebec
  - coordinates: 48°11′45″N 77°44′50″W
- Mouth: Hannah Bay off James Bay
  - location: 60 km east of Moosonee, Ontario
  - coordinates: 51°10′00″N 79°47′30″W
  - elevation: 0 m (0 ft)
- Length: 533 km (331 mi)
- Basin size: 29,300 km^{2} (11,300 sq mi)
- Discharge
  - average: 570 m^{3}/s (20,000 cu ft/s)

The Harricana River (French: Rivière Harricana, pronounced [ʁivjɛʁ aʁikana]) (also known as Harricanaw River) is a river in western Quebec and northeastern Ontario, Canada. It is 533 kilometres (331 mi) long, has a drainage area of 29,300 square kilometres (11,300 sq mi), and has a mean discharge of 570 cubic metres per second (20,000 cu ft/s). While 80% of its drainage area is in Quebec, the river flows for a short distance through Ontario before it ends in Hannah Bay off James Bay.

Because of its undeveloped nature, easy upstream access, and the possibility to paddle to and take out at Moosonee, the Harricana River is popular for canoeing trips to James Bay.

== Geography ==
The Harricana originates at Lake Blouin just north of Val-d'Or. From here De Montigny and Lemoine Lakes add to it before it flows through a series of lakes such as Malartic, La Motte, and Figuery Lakes. After flowing through the town of Amos, one more significant lake follows: Lake Obalski.

North of Amos the river crosses lush boreal forests, where extensive logging takes place. Toward its mouth at Hannah Bay, the forest gradually decreases and is replaced with many wetlands. Here the Harricana has considerable speed and a flat relief, flowing through undeveloped wilderness.

=== Notable tributaries ===
(from headwaters to mouth)

- Berry River
- Desboues River
- Miniac River
- Octave River
- Coigny River
- Plamondon River
- Samson River
- Turgeon River
  - Theo River
  - Wawagosic River
- Again River
- Kesagami River

== History ==
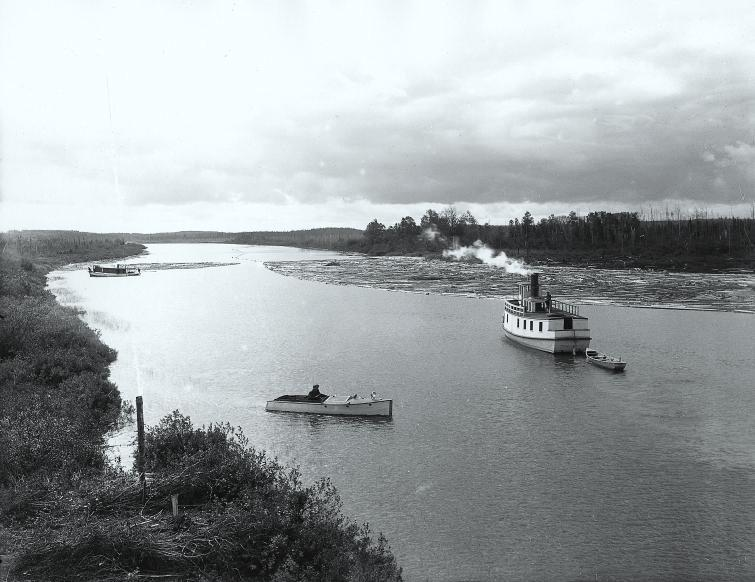
Log driving on the Harricana at Amos, circa 1916.

The Harricana was first used by the Algonquins as a river route.

As a tributary of the James Bay, and thus of the Hudson Bay, the Harricana River and its basin were part of Rupert's Land, de facto property of the Hudson's Bay Company by exclusive charter of 1670. But not until 1801, Alexander MacKenzie mapped the entire route of the river for the first time and identified it by name Harricanaw. In 1835, the map of Bradford called it Harricana. The Rupert's Land Act 1868 transferred the river and its basin to Canada and was officially annexed to the Province of Quebec in 1898. Thereafter colonization and settlement on the upper Harricana began in earnest.

In 1906, Henry O' Sullivan explored the shores of Harricana and in 1908, the first camps were established on its banks at the rapids. These were provisioning camps for the transcontinental railroad construction. A few years later, in 1910, the first colonists arrive and found the town of Amos at the place where the railroad crosses the river.

== Toponymy ==
The river's name originates from the Algonquin word Nanikana, meaning "the main way" or "Biscuit River", depending on the source. Biscuit (or ànakonà in Algonquin, aanakonaa in Ojibwe, and aaihkunaau in East James Bay Cree) refers to bannock-like the unusual flat stones, sand, limestone and clay concretions, which are found in the river, called Pierres de fée or "fairy stones."

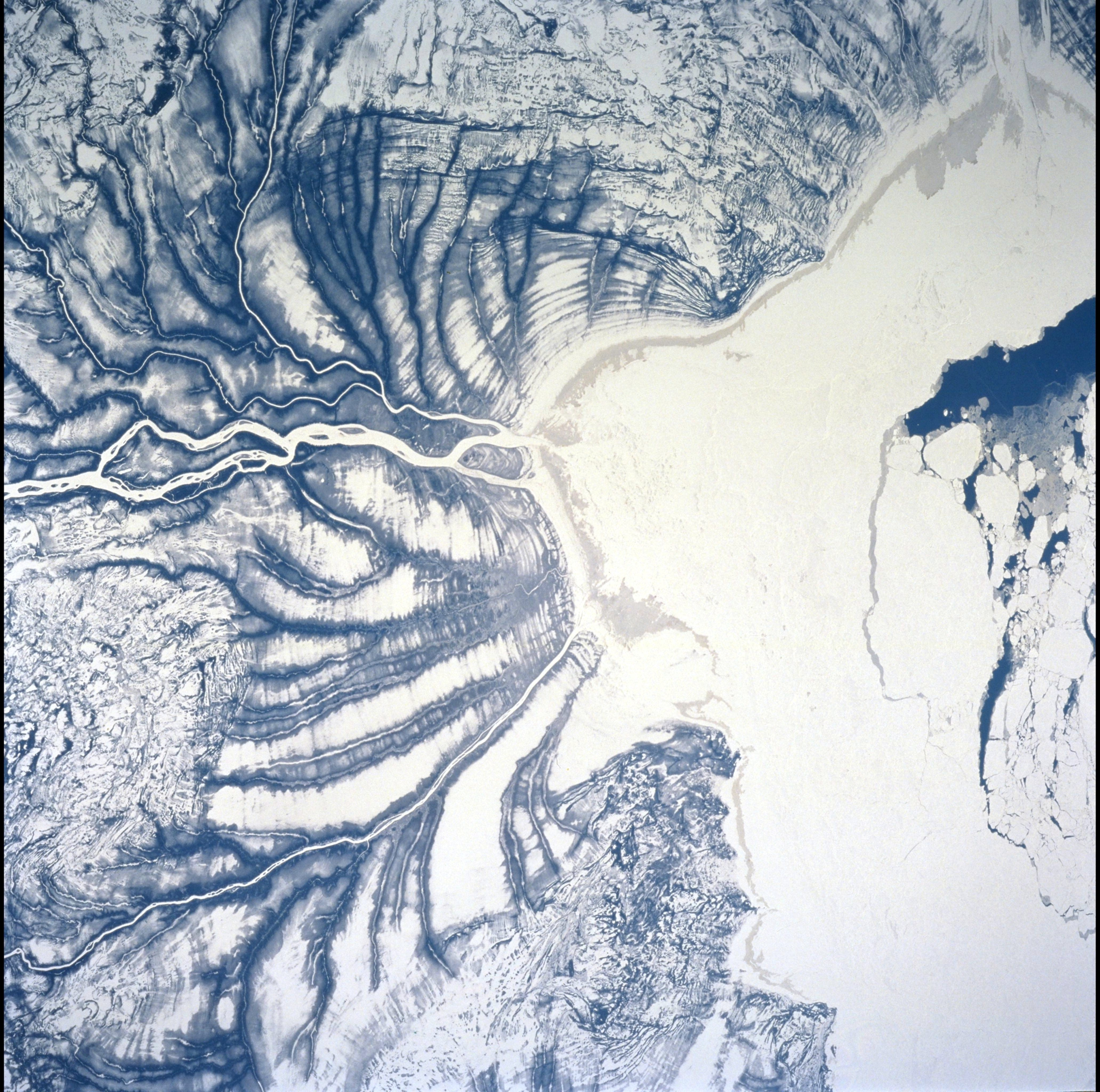
The Harricana River and its mouth at Hannah Bay is visible on the left.

Through history various spellings have been reported: "ᴀʌᴀᴋoʌᴀ" (anàkonà) (Algonquin), "anâkona" or "uhnahkoonah" (anaakonaa) (Ojibwe) and "ayukoona'w" (aaihkunaau) (Cree). The Algonquins also use the name Inikana, meaning "river route". A segment of the river in East James Bay Cree was called Waashahaau Siipii, which means "river to the bay".

== See also ==
- List of rivers of Ontario
- List of rivers of Quebec
