= Black Lake =

Black Lake or Black Lakes may refer to:

== Places ==
=== Canada ===
- Black Lake (Nova Scotia), several lakes
- Black Lake (Saskatchewan)
  - Black Lake Denesuline First Nation, a Denesuline First Nations band government on the northwest shore
- Black Lake, Quebec, a former city that is now part of Thetford Mines

==== Ontario ====
- Algoma District
  - Black Lake (Blind River)
  - Black Lake (Barager Township)
  - Black Lake (LeCaron Township)
- Black Lake (Central Frontenac), Frontenac County
- Haliburton County
  - Black Lake (Dysart et al)
  - Black Lake (Minden Hills)
- Kenora District
  - Black Lake (Marchington River)
  - Black Lake (Sioux Narrows-Nestor Falls)
  - Black Lakes (Ontario), a pair of lakes

=== Mongolia ===
- Khar Lake (Khovd)
- Khar Lake (Zavkhan)

=== Switzerland ===
- Lago Nero (Ticino) (Black Lake)
- Lai Nair, Tarasp, Grisons (Black Lake)
- Lai Neir (Alp Flix), Sur, Grisons (Black Lake)
- Lej Nair (Bernina), Pontresina, Grisons (Black Lake)
- Schwarzsee/Lac Noir (Black Lake)
- Schwarzsee (Zermatt), Valais (Black Lake)
- Schwarzsee (Oberems), Valais (Black Lake)
- Schwarzsee (Blatten), Valais (Black Lake)
- Schwarzsee (Pizol), canton of St. Gallen

=== United Kingdom ===
- Black Lake, Sandwell, in the List of areas in Sandwell, England
  - Black Lake tram stop, and the surrounding area and lake
- Black Lake Nature Reserve, Cheshire, England
- Llyn Dulyn (Black Lake), Wales

=== United States ===
- Black Lake (Arkansas County, Arkansas), in List of lakes of Arkansas County, Arkansas
- Black Lake (Bradley County, Arkansas), in List of lakes in Bradley County, Arkansas
- Black Lake (Calhoun County, Arkansas), in List of lakes in Calhoun County, Arkansas
- Black Lake (Eagle County, Colorado)
- Black Lake (Florida), in Orange County
- Black Lake (Louisiana), in Natchitoches Parish
- Black Lake, Michigan, an unincorporated community
- Black Lake (Michigan), in Cheboygan and Presque Isle counties
- Black Lake (Berrien County, Michigan)
- Black Lake (Montana), in List of lakes in Missoula County, Montana
- Black Lake (New York), in Saint Lawrence County
- Black Lake (Washington), in Thurston County

=== Elsewhere ===
- Černé jezero (Black Lake), the largest lake in the Czech Republic
- Black Lake (Kerry), a mountain pass in Ireland
- Black Lake (Montenegro)
- Black Lake (Triglav Lakes Valley) or Črno jezero, Slovenia
- Karagöl, Giresun (Black lake), Turkey

== Arts and entertainment ==
- Black Lake, a fictional loch near Hogwarts in the Harry Potter films
- Black Lake, the home of the Old Gregg character from The Mighty Boosh BBC television show
- Black Lake, a fictional location in the TV series Twin Peaks
- Black Lake (TV series), a 2016 Swedish TV series
- "Black Lake" a song by Björk from the album Vulnicura
- Black Lake, Maine, a fictional lake in the movie Lake Placid (film). (There is also a real Black Lake in Maine.)
- Black Lakes, Rock Band

== See also ==
- Black Lakes (disambiguation)
- Lac Noir (disambiguation)
- Lago Nero (disambiguation)
- Lai Neir (disambiguation)
- Lej Nair (disambiguation)
- Schwarzer See (disambiguation)
- Schwarzsee (disambiguation)
- Svartsjön, Hanveden (Black Lake), a lake in Södermanland, Sweden
- Crna Bara (disambiguation)
