= List of lakes of Ontario: B =

List of lakes of Ontario beginning with the letter B

This is a list of lakes of Ontario beginning with the letter B.

== B–Bac ==
- Lake B
- B Lake
- Bab Lake
- Babcock Lake
- Babey Lake
- Babiche Lake
- Babin Lake
- Babs Lake
- Baby Joe Lake
- Baby Lake (Joseph Lake, Seguin)
- Baby Lake (Sudbury District)
- Baby Lake (Clear Lake, Seguin)
- Baby Lake
- Baby Shingwak Lake
- Babycoot Lake
- Bacchus Mud Lake
- Bach Lake (Thunder Bay District)
- Bach Lake (Timiskaming District)
- Back Lake (Algoma District)
- Back Lake (Thunder Bay District)
- Back Lake (Parry Sound District)
- Back Lake (Hastings County)
- Backup Lake
- Backward Lake
- Bacon Lake (Parry Sound District)
- Bacon Lake (Algoma District)

== Bad—Bam ==
- Bad Lake (Sudbury District)
- Bad Lake (Nipissing District)
- Bad Lake (Cochrane District)
- Bad Medicine Lake
- Bad Vermilion Lake
- Baden-Powell Lake
- Bader Lake
- Badesdawa Lake
- Badge Lake
- Badgeley Lake
- Badger Lake (Sudbury District)
- Badger Lake (Thunder Bay District)
- Badgerow Lake
- Badgley Lake
- Badland Lake
- Badour Lake
- Badrock Lake
- Badshaw Lake
- Badshot Lake
- Badwater Lake (Thunder Bay District)
- Badwater Lake (Rainy River District)
- Baerr Lake
- Baffle Lake
- Bag Lake
- Baggy Lake
- Bagot Long Lake
- Bagpipe Lake
- Bagsverd Lake
- Bailey Lake (Frechette Township, Sudbury District)
- Bailey Lake (Ulster Township, Sudbury District)
- Bailey Lake (Lennox and Addington County)
- Bailey Lake (Renfrew County)
- Bailey Lake (Bridgland Township, Algoma District)
- Bailey Lake (Kenora District)
- Bailey Lake (Muskoka District)
- Bailey Lake (Nipissing District)
- Bailey Lake (Opasatika Township, Algoma District)
- Bailey Lake (Timiskaming District)
- Baileys Lake
- Baillargeon Lake
- Baimwawa Lake
- Bain Lake (Parry Sound District)
- Bain Lake (Nipissing District)
- Bain Lake (Sudbury District)
- Bain Lake (Kenora District)
- Baird Lake (Algoma District)
- Baird Lake (Rainy River District)
- Baisley Lake
- Bait Lake
- Baize Lake
- Bajoras Lake
- Bakado Lake
- Bake Lake
- Baker Lake (Howells Township, Cochrane District)
- Baker Lake (Timmins)
- Baker Lake (Kenora District)
- Baker Lake (Timiskaming District)
- Baker Lake (Haliburton County)
- Baker Lake (Tweed Township, Cochrane District)
- Baker Lake (Thunder Bay District)
- Baker Lake (Sudbury District)
- Balancing Lake
- Bald Lake
- Baldcoot Lake
- Baldhead Lake (Algoma District)
- Baldhead Lake (Thunder Bay District)
- Baldwin Lake (Nipissing District)
- Baldwin Lake (Thunder Bay District)
- Baldwin Lake (Rainy River District)
- Baldwins Lake
- Baldy Lake
- Bale Lake
- Bales Lake
- Balfour Lake (Cochrane District)
- Balfour Lake (Nipissing District)
- Balfour Lake (Sudbury District)
- Balkam Lake
- Ball Lake (Kenora District)
- Ball Lake (Parry Sound District)
- Ball Lake (Thunder Bay District)
- Ball Lake (Lennox and Addington County)
- Ballantyne Lake (Wikweyau Creek, Cochrane District)
- Ballantyne Lake (Mowbray Township, Cochrane District)
- Ballantyne Lake (Nipissing District)
- Ballard Lake (Algoma District)
- Ballard Lake (Rainy River District)
- Ballast Lake
- Ballina Lake
- Ballinafad Lake
- Ballon Lake
- Balmain Lake
- Balmer Lake (Kenora District)
- Balmer Lake (Renfrew County)
- Balmoral Lake
- Balne Lake
- Balog Lake
- Baloney Lake (Algoma District)
- Baloney Lake (Thunder Bay District)
- Balsam Lake (Nipissing District)
- Balsam Lake (Kawartha Lakes)
- Balsam Lake (Killarney)
- Balsam Lake (Cochrane District)
- Balsam Lake (Frechette Township, Sudbury District)
- Balsam Lake (Thunder Bay District)
- Balsam Lake (Parry Sound District)
- Balsawood Lake
- Balson Lake
- Baltic Lake
- Baltimore Lake
- Baltzer Lake
- Bamaji Lake
- Bambino Lake
- Bamboo Lake
- Bamford Lake (Cochrane District)
- Bamford Lake (Kenora District)
- Bamoos Lake

== Ban ==
- Banak Lake
- Banana Lake (Dalmas Township, Sudbury District)
- Banana Lake (Topham Township, Sudbury District)
- Banana Lake (Nickle Township, Thunder Bay District)
- Banana Lake (Kenora District)
- Banana Lake (Valin Township, Sudbury District)
- Banana Lake (Timiskaming District)
- Banana Lake (Temagami)
- Banana Lake (Hornepayne)
- Banana Lake (Rainy River District)
- Banana Lake (Garrow Township, Nipissing District)
- Banana Lake (Winston Creek, Thunder Bay District)
- Banana Lake (Elliot Lake)
- Bananish Lake
- Bancar Lake
- Bancroft Lake
- Band Lake (Nipissing District)
- Band Lake (Sudbury District)
- Bandit Lake
- Bangs Lake
- Bank Lake
- Banker Lake
- Bankfield Lake
- Banks Lake (Timiskaming District)
- Banks Lake (Cochrane District)
- Bannagan Lake
- Banner Lake (Timiskaming District)
- Banner Lake (Hastings County)
- Bannerman Lake (Cochrane District)
- Bannerman Lake (Sudbury District)
- Banning Lake
- Bannister Lake (Waterloo Region)
- Bannister Lake (Thunder Bay District)
- Bannockburn Lake
- Banquet Lake
- Banshee Lake (Canisbay Township, Nipissing District)
- Banshee Lake (West Nipissing)
- Banville Lake

== Bap ==
- Baptism Lake
- Baptiste Lake (Timiskaming District)
- Baptiste Lake (Hastings County)

== Bar ==
- Bar Lake (Sudbury District)
- Bar Lake (Kenora District)
- Baragar Lake
- Barager's Lake
- Barbara Lake (Namewaminikan River, Thunder Bay District)
- Barbara Lake (Barbara Creek, Thunder Bay District)
- Barbara Lake (Algoma District)
- Barbaro Lake
- Barbe Lake
- Barber Lake (Cochrane District)
- Barber Lake (Speight Township, Timiskaming District)
- Barber Lake (McGarry)
- Barber Lake (Rainy River District)
- Barbers Lake
- Lac Barbotte
- Barbut Lake
- Barclay Lake
- Bard Lake
- Bardney Lake
- Bardwell Lake
- Bare Hill Lake
- Bare Lake
- Bare Tent Lake
- Barefoot Lakes
- Barehead Lake
- Barfoot Lake
- Barge Lake
- Baril Lake
- Barite Lake
- Bark Lake, Renfrew County and Nipissing District
- Bark Lake (Keikewabik Lake, Kenora District)
- Bark Lake (Haliburton County)
- Bark Lake (Lumby Creek, Kenora District)
- Bark Lake (Assad Township, Algoma District)
- Bark Lake (Sudbury District)
- Bark Lake (Barnes Township, Algoma District)
- Barker Lake
- Barkley Lake
- Barkway Lake
- Barland Lake
- Barlow Lake (MacBeth Township, Sudbury District)
- Barlow Lake (Hendrie Township, Sudbury District)
- Barmac Lake
- Barn Lake (Bikerace Lake, Thunder Bay District)
- Barn Lake (Algoma District)
- Barn Lake (Oboshkegan Township, Thunder Bay District)
- Barnabe Lake
- Barnacle Lake
- Barnard Lake (Lennox and Addington County)
- Barnard Lake (Thunder Bay District)
- Barnard Lake (Timiskaming District)
- Barnes Lake (Muskoka District)
- Barnes Lake (Nipissing District)
- Barnes Lake (Kenora District)
- Barnes Lake (Cochrane District)
- Barnet Lake (Cochrane District)
- Barnet Lake (Sudbury District)
- Barnett Lake
- Barney Lake (Algoma District)
- Barney Lake (Parry Sound District)
- Barney Lake (Bruce County)
- Barnhart Lake
- Barns Lake
- Barnspoon Lake
- Barnston Lake
- Barnum Lake (Jacques Township, Thunder Bay District)
- Barnum Lake (Haliburton County)
- Barnum Lake (McGillis Township, Thunder Bay District)
- Barr Lake (Kenora District)
- Barr Lake (Timiskaming District)
- Barr Lake (Algoma District)
- Barr Lake (Renfrew County)
- Barr Lake (Thunder Bay District)
- Barrage Lake
- Barras Lake
- Barre Lake
- Barred Owl Lake
- Barrel Lake
- Barrett Lake
- Barrett Pond
- Barrette Lake
- Barretts Lake
- Barretts Pond
- Barrhead Mill Pond
- Barrie Lake
- Barrie's Lake
- Barrigar Lake
- Barrington Lake
- Barris Lake
- Barron Lake
- Barron's Lake
- Lac Barroque
- Barrs Lake (Renfrew County)
- Barrs Lake (Frontenac County)
- Barry Lake (Northumberland County)
- Barry Lake (Renfrew County)
- Barse Lake
- Bart Lake
- Barter Lake
- Barth Lake (Kenora District)
- Barth Lake (Timiskaming District)
- Bartle Lake
- Bartlett Lake (Timiskaming District)
- Bartlett Lake (Nipissing District)
- Bartlett Lake (Hastings County)
- Bartley Lake (Bruce County)
- Bartley Lake (Kenora District)
- Bartman Lake
- Barton Lake (Frontenac County)
- Barton Lake (Parry Sound District)
- Bartraw Lake
- Barty Lake

== Bas ==
- Base Lake (Jackman Township, Kenora District)
- Base Lake (Algoma District)
- Base Lake (Base Creek, Kenora District)
- Baseline Lake
- Basen Lake
- Basher Lake
- Basil Lake (Kenora District)
- Basil Lake (Nipissing District)
- Basils Lake
- Basin Lake (Kenora District)
- Basin Lake (Nipissing District)
- Basin Lake (Leeds and Grenville United Counties)
- Basket Lake (Basket River, Kenora District)
- Basket Lake (Redditt Township, Kenora District)
- Bass Lake (Kashabowie Lake, Thunder Bay District)
- Bass Lake (Valley East, Greater Sudbury)
- Bass Lake (Timiskaming District)
- Bass Lake (Grey County)
- Bass Lake (Manitoulin District)
- Bass Lake (Patterson Township, Parry Sound District)
- Bass Lake (Killarney)
- Bass Lake (Renfrew County)
- Bass Lake (Simcoe County)
- Bass Lake (Shuniah)
- Bass Lake (Haentschel Township, Sudbury District)
- Bass Lake (South Frontenac)
- Bass Lake (Central Frontenac)
- Bass Lake (Rainy River District)
- Bass Lake (Telfer Township, Sudbury District)
- Bass Lake (Aberdeen Township, Algoma District)
- Bass Lake (Blind River)
- Bass Lake (Wilson Township, Parry Sound District)
- Bass Lake (Whitefish Lake 6)
- Bass Lake (Baril Lake, Thunder Bay District)
- Bass Lake (Syine Township, Thunder Bay District)
- Bass Lake (Walden, Greater Sudbury)
- Bass Lake (Peterborough County)
- Bass Lake (Eagle Lake, Kenora District)
- Bass Lake (Leeds and the Thousand Islands)
- Bass Lake (Mongowin Township, Sudbury District)
- Bass Lake (Rideau Lakes)
- Bass Lake (Parkin Township, Greater Sudbury)
- Bass Lake (Roughrock Lake, Kenora District)
- Bass Lake (Muskoka Lakes)
- Bass Lake (Morse Township, Sudbury District)
- Bass Lake (Cameron Lake, Kenora District)
- Bass Lake (Gravenhurst)
- Bass Pond
- Bassfin Lake
- Basshaunt Lake
- Basshook Lake
- Bassoon Lake
- Basswood Lake (Algoma District)
- Basswood Lake (Rainy River District)
- Bassy Lake
- Bastedo Lake
- Bastian Lake

== Bat–Bau ==
- Bat Lake (Nipissing District)
- Bat Lake (Parry Sound District)
- Bat Lake (Minden Hills)
- Bat Lake (Sudbury District)
- Bat Lake (Dysart et al)
- Bat Lake (Dorion)
- Bat Lake (Barnacle Lake, Thunder Bay District)
- Bat Lake (Rainy River District)
- Batchawana Lake
- Batchelor Lake
- Batchewaung Lake
- Bate Lake (Thunder Bay District)
- Bate Lake (Kenora District)
- Batelle Lake
- Bateman Lake
- Bates Lake
- Bath Lake (Pays Plat River, Thunder Bay District)
- Bath Lake (Boiling Sand River, Thunder Bay District)
- Bathurst Lake
- Batise Lake (Nipissing District)
- Batise Lake (Thunder Bay District)
- Lac Batiste
- Batters Lake
- Battersby Lake
- Battery Lake
- Battley Lake
- Batwing Lake
- Baubee Lake
- Baudette Lake
- Baumheur Lake

== Baw–Bay ==
- Bawden Lake
- Bawk Lake
- Baxter Lake (Cochrane District)
- Baxter Lake (Lanark County)
- Baxter Lake (Muskoka District)
- Bay Berry Lakes
- Bay Lake (Tweedle Township, Algoma District)
- Bay Lake (Cochrane District)
- Bay Lake (Patton Township, Algoma District)
- Bay Lake (Blind River)
- Bay Lake (Hastings County)
- Bay Lake (Parry Sound District)
- Bay Lake (Timiskaming District)
- Bay Lake (Nipissing District)
- Bay Lake (Lessard Township, Algoma District)
- Bay Lake (Sudbury District)
- Bayfield Lake
- Bayly Lake (Sudbury District)
- Bayly Lake (Kenora District)
- Bayly Lake (Cochrane District)
- Baynes Lake
- Lake of Bays (Muskoka District)
- Lake of Bays (Kenora District)
- Lake of the Bays
- Bays Lake
- Bayshell Lake
- Bayson Lake
- Bayswater Lake
- Baytree Lake
- Bayview Lake

== Bea ==
- Bea Lake (Cochrane District)
- Bea Lake (Hastings County)
- Beach Lake (Nipissing District)
- Beach Lake (Kenora District)
- Beacon Lake
- Beadle Lake
- Beagle Lake
- Beak Lake (Kenora District)
- Beak Lake (Algoma District)
- Beales Lake
- Beamish Lake
- Bean Lake (Bean Creek, Kenora District)
- Bean Lake (MacNicol Township, Kenora District)
- Bean Lake (Thunder Bay District)
- Bean Lake (Straight Lake, Kenora District)
- Bean Lake (Algoma District)
- Bean Lake (Cochrane District)
- Beanpod Lake
- Beanpole Lake
- Bear Den Lake
- Bear Head Lake
- Bear Lake (Roosevelt Township, Sudbury District)
- Bear Lake (French River)
- Bear Lake (Hornepayne)
- Bear Lake (Manitoulin District)
- Bear Lake (East Burpee Township, Whitestone)
- Bear Lake (Georgian Bay)
- Bear Lake (North Frontenac)
- Bear Lake (Thunder Bay District)
- Bear Lake (Renfrew County)
- Bear Lake (Hunter Township, Nipissing District)
- Bear Lake (Pistol Creek, Kenora District)
- Bear Lake (West Nipissing)
- Bear Lake (Hastings County)
- Bear Lake (McMurrich/Monteith)
- Bear Lake (Lennox and Addington County)
- Bear Lake (Haliburton County)
- Bear Lake (Bedford Township, South Frontenac)
- Bear Lake (South Algonquin)
- Bear Lake (Hammell Township, Nipissing District)
- Bear Lake (Lehman Township, Algoma District)
- Bear Lake (Muskoka Lakes)
- Bear Lake (Burton Township, Whitestone)
- Bear Lake (Pettypiece Township, Kenora District)
- Bear Lake (Timiskaming District)
- Bear Lake (Loughborough Township, South Frontenac)
- Bear Lake (Yeo Township, Sudbury District)
- Bear Lake (Hollinger Township, Sudbury District)
- Bear Lake (Cochrane District)
- Bear Lake (Rice Lake, Kenora District)
- Bear Mountain Lake
- Bear Pond (Kenora District)
- Bear Pond (Lennox and Addington County)
- Bear Shanty Lake
- Bear Tooth Lake
- Bear Trap Lake
- Bearbone Lake
- Bearcub Lake
- Beardens Lake
- Beardmore Lake
- Bearhead Lake
- Bearpad Lake
- Bearpaw Lake (Kenora District)
- Bearpaw Lake (Muskoka District)
- Bearpaw Lake (Algoma District)
- Bearpelt Lake
- Bearshead Lake
- Bearskin Lake (Kenora District)
- Bearskin Lake (Thunder Bay District)
- Bearskull Lake
- Bearsmouth Lake
- Beartrack Lake (Sudbury District)
- Beartrack Lake (Kenora District)
- Beartrap Lake (Banner Creek, Thunder Bay District)
- Beartrap Lake (Blackwater River, Thunder Bay District)
- Beasley Lake
- Beast Lake
- Beath Lake
- Beaton Lake (Muskoka District)
- Beaton Lake (Algoma District)
- Beatrice Lake
- Beatrix Lake
- Beattie Lake (Sudbury District)
- Beattie Lake (Cochrane District)
- Beattie Lake (Bruce County)
- Beattie Lake (Muskoka District)
- Beattie Pond
- Beatty Lake (Lennox and Addington County)
- Beatty Lake (Lynch Creek, Thunder Bay District)
- Beatty Lake (Greenstone)
- Beatty's Lake
- Beau Lake (Sudbury District)
- Beau Lake (Nipissing District)
- Beaubien Lake
- Beaucage Lake (Cochrane District)
- Beaucage Lake (Sudbury District)
- Beaucoup Lakes
- Beaudin Lake
- Beaudry Lake (Sudbury District)
- Beaudry Lake (Parry Sound District)
- Beaudry Lake (Nipissing District)
- Beauport Lake
- Beauregard Lake
- Beautiful Lake
- Beauty Lake (Kenora District)
- Beauty Lake (Timiskaming District)
- Beaver Dam Lake
- Beaver House Lake
- Beaver Lake (Copenace Township, Algoma District)
- Beaver Lake (Nipissing)
- Beaver Lake (Lanark County)
- Beaver Lake (Griffith Township, Greater Madawaska)
- Beaver Lake (Greater Sudbury)
- Beaver Lake (Pukaskwa River, Thunder Bay District)
- Beaver Lake (Valin Township, Sudbury District)
- Beaver Lake (Kearney)
- Beaver Lake (Simcoe County)
- Beaver Lake (Carling)
- Beaver Lake (Chain Creek, Thunder Bay District)
- Beaver Lake (Gunterman Township, Elliot Lake)
- Beaver Lake (Bear Lake, Kenora District)
- Beaver Lake (Begin Township, Thunder Bay District)
- Beaver Lake (Lipton Township, Algoma District)
- Beaver Lake (Keesickquayash Township, Algoma District)
- Beaver Lake (Beange Township, Elliot Lake)
- Beaver Lake (Roosevelt Township, Sudbury District)
- Beaver Lake (Lennox and Addington County)
- Beaver Lake (Zealand Township, Kenora District)
- Beaver Lake (Timmins)
- Beaver Lake (Magnetawan)
- Beaver Lake (Gooseneck Lake, Kenora District)
- Beaver Lake (Head, Clara and Maria)
- Beaver Lake (Haliburton County)
- Beaver Lake (Kennedy Township, Cochrane District)
- Beaver Lake (Rainy River District)
- Beaver Lake (Oso Township, Central Frontenac)
- Beaver Lake (McGarry)
- Beaver Lake (Haycock Township, Kenora District)
- Beaver Lake (Matachewan 72)
- Beaver Lake (Matawatchan Township, Greater Madawaska)
- Beaver Lake (Peterborough County)
- Beaver Lake (Olden Township, Central Frontenac)
- Beaver Lake (Bayly Township, Timiskaming District)
- Beaver Lake (Mackenzie River, Thunder Bay District)
- Beaver Lake (Lessard Township, Algoma District)
- Beaver Lakes (Greater Sudbury)
- Beaver Lakes (Cochrane District)
- Beaver Lakes (Sudbury District)
- Beaver Meadow Lakes
- Beaver Pond (Lennox and Addington County)
- Beaver Pond (Thunder Bay District)
- Beaver Pond (Renfrew County)
- Beavercross Lake
- Beaverdam Lake (Thunder Bay District)
- Beaverdam Lake (Renfrew County)
- Beaverflood Lake (Algoma District)
- Beaverflood Lake (Sudbury District)
- Beaverhide Lake
- Beaverhouse Lake (Timiskaming District)
- Beaverhouse Lake (Kenora District)
- Beaverhouse Lake (Thunder Bay District)
- Beaverhouse Lake (Algoma District)
- Beaverhouse Lake (Rainy River District)
- Beaverkit Lake (Thunder Bay District)
- Beaverkit Lake (Algoma District)
- Beaverlea Lake
- Beaverlodge Lake
- Beaverly Lake
- Beavermud Lake
- Beaverpaw Lake
- Beaverpond Lake
- Beaverskin Lake
- Beaverstone Lake
- Beavertail Lake (Cochrane District)
- Beavertail Lake (Algoma District)
- Beavertail Lake (Sudbury District)
- Beavertooth Lake (Sudbury District)
- Beavertooth Lake (Nipissing District)
- Beavertrap Lake (Algoma District)
- Beavertrap Lake (Thunder Bay District)
- Beavis Lake

== Beb–Bem ==
- Bebees Lake
- Beck Lake
- Becker Lake
- Beckett Lake (Sudbury District)
- Beckett Lake (Parry Sound District)
- Beckham Lake
- Becking Lake
- Beckington Lake
- Becor Lake
- Bedard Ponds
- Bedford Lake
- Bedivere Lake
- Bednargik Lake
- Bedore Lake
- Bee Lake (Rainy River District)
- Bee Lake (Nipissing District)
- Bee Lake (Lac Seul, Kenora District)
- Bee Lake (Tustin Township, Kenora District)
- Bee Lake (Thunder Bay District)
- Bee Lake (Cochrane District)
- Bee Lake (Manigotagan River, Kenora District)
- Bee Pond
- Beebee Lake (Kenora District)
- Beebee Lake (Lennox and Addington County)
- Beech Lake (Kawartha Lakes)
- Beech Lake (Haliburton County)
- Beech Lake (Lennox and Addington County)
- Beech-drops Pond
- Beecher Lake
- Beeches Lake
- Beechnut Lake
- Beef Lake
- Beeftea Lake
- Beeline Lake
- Beeney Lake
- Beer Lake (Kenora District)
- Beer Lake (Haliburton County)
- Beerman Lake
- Beers Lake
- Beeswax Lake
- Beetle Lake
- Beeva Lake
- Beg Lake
- Beggs Lake (Thunder Bay District)
- Beggs Lake (Kenora District)
- Begley Lake
- Begonia Lake
- Behan Lake
- Beilby Lake
- Beilhartz Lake
- Beishlag Lake
- Bejeau Lake
- Beker Lake
- Belair Lake
- Belaire Lake
- Beland Lake
- Belanger Lake (Lascelles Township, Algoma District)
- Belanger Lake (Renfrew County)
- Belanger Lake (Nipissing District)
- Belanger Lake (Asselin Township, Algoma District)
- Belanger Lakes
- Belcoure Lake
- Belec Lakes
- Belfry Lake
- Belgium Lake
- Belisle Lake
- Bell Lake (Kearney)
- Bell Lake (Rainy River District)
- Bell Lake (Thunder Bay District)
- Bell Lake (Nipissing District)
- Bell Lake (Machin)
- Bell Lake (Greater Sudbury)
- Bell Lake (Ferguson Township, McDougall)
- Bell Lake (Algoma District)
- Bell Lake (Timmins)
- Bell Lake (Whitestone)
- Bell Lake (GTP Block 7 Township)
- Bell Lake (McDougall Township, McDougall)
- Bell Lake (Mulvey Township, Cochrane District)
- Bell Lake (Carter Township, Sudbury District)
- Bell Lake (Badgley Lake, Kenora District)
- Bell Rapids Lake
- Bell's Lake
- Bell's Pond
- Bella Lake
- Bellamys Lake
- Lac la Belle
- Belle Lake (Timiskaming District)
- Belle Lake (Nipissing District)
- Belle Lake (Kenora District)
- Belleau Lake (Tupper Township, Algoma District)
- Belleau Lake (Garden River 14)
- Belleek Lake
- Belle Isle Lake
- Bellmore Lake
- Bells Lake (Thunder Bay District)
- Bells Lake (Parry Sound District)
- Bells Lake (Grey County)
- Bellsmith Lake
- Belmont Lake
- Beloporine Lake
- Below Bow Lake
- Belt Lake
- Belton Lake
- Lake Belwood
- Bemar Lake

== Ben ==
- Ben Lake (Kenora District)
- Ben Lake (Muskoka District)
- Ben's Pond
- Bena Lake
- Benbow Lake
- Bend Lake (Rainy River District)
- Bend Lake (Sudbury District)
- Bendall Lake
- Bender Lake
- Bending Knee Lake
- Bending Lake
- Benedict Lake
- Benelux Lake
- Beniah Lake
- Benjamin Lake
- Benmeen Lake
- Benner Lake (Algoma District)
- Benner Lake (Sudbury District)
- Bennet Lake (Cochrane District)
- Bennet Lake (Sudbury District)
- Bennett Lake (Sudbury District)
- Bennett Lake (Kenora District)
- Bennett Lake (Lanark County)
- Bennett Lake (Rainy River District)
- Bennett Lake (Parry Sound District)
- Bennett Lake (Hastings County)
- Bennetts Lake
- Benneweis Lake
- Benninger Lake
- Benny Lake
- Benny's Lake
- Benoir Lake
- Benoit Lake
- Benson Lake (Leeds and Grenville United Counties)
- Benson Lake (Sudbury District)
- Benson Lake (Muskoka District)
- Benson Lake (Thunder Bay District)
- Benson Lake (Timiskaming District)
- Benson Lake (Kenora District)
- Benstead Lake
- Benstewart Lake
- Bent Lake (Kenora District)
- Bent Lake (Sudbury District)
- Bentarm Lake (Kenora District)
- Bentarm Lake (Thunder Bay District)
- Bentarm Lake (Haliburton County)
- Bentley Lake (Hastings County)
- Bentley Lake (Thunder Bay District)
- Bentley Lake (Cochrane District)
- Bentpine Lake
- Bentshoe Lakes
- Bentti Lake

== Beo–Bey ==
- Beo Lake
- Berberis Lake
- Bercole Lake
- Beresford Lake (Sudbury District)
- Beresford Lake (Kenora District)
- Berford Lake
- Berg Lake
- Berger Lake
- Bergeron Lake
- Berglund Lake
- Bergman Lakes
- Bergsma Lake
- Berkstrom Lake
- Berm Lake
- Bernadine Lake (Kenora District)
- Bernadine Lake (Thunder Bay District)
- Lake Bernard
- Bernard Lake (Sudbury District)
- Bernard Lake (Renfrew County)
- Bernard Lake (Algoma District)
- Berndt Lake
- Bernhardt Lake
- Bernice Lake (Nipissing District)
- Bernice Lake (Sudbury District)
- Bernice Lake (Thunder Bay District)
- Berniece Lake
- Berry Lake (Muskoka District)
- Berry Lake (Algoma District)
- Berry Lake (Cochrane District)
- Berry Lake (Nango River, Kenora District)
- Berry Lake (Thunder Bay District)
- Berry Lake (Sioux Narrows-Nestor Falls)
- Berry Lakes
- Berryblue Lake
- Berrycan Lake
- Berryman Lake
- Bert Lake
- Bertaud Lake
- Bertha Lake (Thunder Bay District)
- Bertha Lake (Kenora District)
- Bertha Lake (Nipissing District)
- Berthier Lake
- Bertie Lake
- Bertoia Lake
- Bertrand Lake (Kenora District)
- Bertrand Lake (Sudbury District)
- Bertrand Lake (Algoma District)
- Berube Lake (Kenora District)
- Berube Lake (Timiskaming District)
- Berwick Lake
- Beshta Lake
- Besley Lake
- Bess Lake
- Bessie Lake (Sudbury District)
- Bessie Lake (Timiskaming District)
- Bessie Lake (Thunder Bay District)
- Best Lake
- Best's Pond
- Bester Lake
- Beta Lake (Thunder Bay District)
- Beta Lake (Sudbury District)
- Beta Lake (Algoma District)
- Beteau Lake
- Beth Lake (Cochrane District)
- Beth Lake (Nipissing District)
- Beth Lake (Thunder Bay District)
- Bethel Lake
- Bethune Lake (Darrow Lake, Rainy River District)
- Bethune Lake (Hardtack Creek, Rainy River District)
- Betsy Lake
- Betty Lake (Thunder Bay District)
- Betty Lake (Nipissing District)
- Betty Lake (Algoma District)
- Betty Lake (Killarney)
- Betty Lake (Tooms Township, Sudbury District)
- Betula Lake
- Between Lake
- Beulah Lake (Thunder Bay District)
- Beulah Lake (Sudbury District)
- Bevan Lake (Cochrane District)
- Bevan Lake (Parry Sound District)
- Bevans Lake
- Bevens Lake
- Beverly Lake
- Bevin Lake (Druillettes Township, Sudbury District)
- Bevin Lake (Thunder Bay District)
- Bevin Lake (Bevin Township, Sudbury District)
- Bewag Lake
- Bews Lake
- Beynon Lake
- Beyond Lake

== Bi ==
- Bianco Lake
- Biber Lake
- Biceps Lake
- Bickford Lake
- Bicknell Lake
- Biddison Lake
- Biddys Lake
- Bidgood Pothole
- Bidwell Lake
- Bieber Lake
- Biederman Pond
- Bienda Lake
- Bierce Lake
- Biernacki Lake
- Biff Lake
- Big Bald Lake
- Big Bass Lake
- Big Bear Lake (Thunder Bay District)
- Big Bear Lake (Algoma District)
- Big Beaver Lake
- Big Ben Lake
- Big Bend Lake
- Big Bilsky Lake
- Big Birch Lake
- Big Bissett Lake
- Big Bob Lake
- Big Boot Lake
- Big Brother Lake
- Big Buck Lake
- Big Burnt Lake
- Big Canoe Lake
- Big Canon Lake
- Big Caribou Lake
- Big Cedar Lake
- Big Clear Lake (South Frontenac)
- Big Clear Lake (Central Frontenac)
- Big Club Lake
- Big Cranberry Lake
- Big Crow Lake
- Big Dawson Lake
- Big Deer Lake
- Big Duck Lake (Kawartha Lakes)
- Big Duck Lake (Thunder Bay District)
- Big Duck Pond
- Big East Lake
- Big Eneas Lake
- Big Finlander Lake
- Big Fish Lake
- Big Fox Lake
- Big George Lake
- Big Ghee Lake
- Big Gibson Lake
- Big Goose Lake
- Big Gull Lake (Sudbury District)
- Big Gull Lake (Frontenac County)
- Big Hardings Lake
- Big Hawk Lake
- Big Herring Lake
- Big Hoover Lake
- Big Horseshoe Lake
- Big Hungry Lake
- Big Island Lake (Big Island, Kenora District)
- Big Island Lake (Shrub Creek, Kenora District)
- Big Jawbone Lake
- Big Jet Lake
- Big Joe Lake (Rainy River District)
- Big Joe Lake (Thunder Bay District)
- Big John Lake
- Big Lake (Frontenac County)
- Big Lake (Corbiere Township, Algoma District)
- Big Lake (Manitoulin District)
- Big Lake (Kenora District)
- Big Lake (Thunder Bay District)
- Big Lake (Renfrew County)
- Big Lake (Blind River)
- Big Lighthouse Lake
- Big Limestone Lake
- Big Lynx Lake
- Big Marconi Lake
- Big Marl Lake
- Big Marsh Lake (Sudbury District)
- Big Marsh Lake (Algoma District)
- Big McCaw Lake
- Big McDougal Lake
- Big McGarry Lake
- Big McLouds Lake
- Big McNeil Lake
- Big Mink Lake
- Big Moon Lake
- Big Moose Lake (Kenora District)
- Big Moose Lake (Timiskaming District)
- Big Mountain Lake
- Big Mud Lake (Bruce County)
- Big Mud Lake (Kenora District)
- Big Mud Lake (Lanark County)
- Big North Lake
- Big Ohlmann Lake
- Big Orillia Lake
- Big Otter Lake
- Big Paddy Lake
- Big Pearl Lake
- Big Pike Lake (Algoma District)
- Big Pike Lake (Cochrane District)
- Big Pine Lake (Hendrie Township, Sudbury District)
- Big Pine Lake (Gilliland Township, Sudbury District)
- Big Point Pond
- Big Poplar Lake
- Big Porcupine Lake
- Big Rae Lake
- Big Rat Lake
- Big Red Lake
- Big Rice Lake
- Big Rideau Lake
- Big Rock Lake
- Big Salmon Lake
- Big Sand Lake
- Big Sandy Lake
- Big Sawbill Lake
- Big Shingle Lake
- Big Skunk Lake
- Big Spring Lake
- Big Stephen Lake
- Big Sunfish Lake
- Big Swamp Lake
- Big Swan Lake
- Big Swawell Lake
- Big Thunder Lake
- Big Trout Lake (Thunder Bay District)
- Big Trout Lake (Nipissing District)
- Big Trout Lake (Kenora District)
- Big Trout Lake (Slievert Township, Algoma District)
- Big Trout Lake (Sudbury District)
- Big Trout Lake (Renfrew County)
- Big Trout Lake (Kawartha Lakes)
- Big Trout Lake (Cadeau Township, Algoma District)
- Big Twin Lake
- Big Valley Lake
- Big Vermilion Lake
- Big Webb Lake
- Big Yirkie Lake
- Bigamy Lake
- Bigfault Lake
- Bigfish Lake
- Bigfools Lake
- Bigford Lake
- Bigfour Lake
- Biggar Lake (Renfrew County)
- Biggar Lake (Nipissing District)
- Bigger Lake (Thunder Bay District)
- Bigger Lake (Rainy River District)
- Biggs Lake (Renfrew County)
- Biggs Lake (Sudbury District)
- Bigham Lake
- Bigmarsh Lake
- Bigrock Lake
- Bigshell Lake
- Bigwalk Lake
- Bigwater Lake
- Bigwind Lake
- Bigwood Lake
- Bijou Lake (Nipissing District)
- Bijou Lake (Algoma District)
- Bikerace Lake
- Bilbe Lake
- Bilge Lake
- Bilkey Lake
- Bill Lake (Selkirk Township, Sudbury District)
- Bill Lake (Rainy River District)
- Bill Lake (Thunder Bay District)
- Bill Lake (Nipissing District)
- Bill Lake (Kenora District)
- Bill Lake (D'Arcy Township, Sudbury District)
- Bill Lake (Kenora District)
- Bill's Lake
- Billboy Lake
- Billet Lake
- Billett Lake
- Billie Lake
- Billinger Lake
- Billings Lake (Highlands East)
- Billings Lake (Nipissing District)
- Billings Lake (Dysart et al)
- Billings Lake (Sudbury District)
- Bills Pond
- Billy Lake (Nipissing District)
- Billy Lake (Sudbury District)
- Billy Lake (Dorion)
- Billy Lake (Killraine Township, Thunder Bay District)
- Billy Lake (Thunder Bay District)
- Billys Lake
- Bilsky Lake
- Bilton Lake
- Binabick Lake
- Binch Lake
- Binder Lake
- Bindo Lake
- Binekan Lake
- Bing Lake (Timiskaming District)
- Bing Lake (Thunder Bay District)
- Bing Lake (Sudbury District)
- Bingle Lake
- Bingley Lake
- Bingo Lake
- Binney Lake
- Binns Lake
- Binson Lake
- Bipemaejoe Lake
- Birch Lake (Sables-Spanish Rivers)
- Birch Lake (Frontenac County)
- Birch Lake (Cochrane District)
- Birch Lake (Killraine Township, Thunder Bay District)
- Birch Lake (Nipissing District)
- Birch Lake (Michipicoten Island, Thunder Bay District)
- Birch Lake (Macdonald, Meredith and Aberdeen Additional)
- Birch Lake (Frechette Township, Sudbury District)
- Birch Lake (Parry Sound District)
- Birch Lake (French River)
- Birch Lake (Huron Shores)
- Birch Lake (Kane Township, Algoma District)
- Birch Lake (Lurch River, Thunder Bay District)
- Birch Lake (Timiskaming District)
- Birch Lake (Slatterly Lake, Kenora District)
- Birch Lake (Evans Township, Sudbury District)
- Birch Lake (Rainy River District)
- Birch Lake (Redditt Township, Kenora District)
- Birch Lake (War Eagle Lake, Kenora District)
- Birch Pond
- Birchall Lake
- Bircham Lake
- Birchbark Lake (Manitoulin District)
- Birchbark Lake (Peterborough County)
- Birchcliffe Lake
- Bird Lake (Nipissing District)
- Bird Lake (Rainy River District)
- Bird Lake (Muskoka District)
- Bird Lake (Sudbury District)
- Bird Lake (Parry Sound District)
- Bird Lake (Timiskaming District)
- Bird Lake (Hastings County)
- Birdie Lake
- Birmingham Lake
- Birston Lake
- Birthday Lake
- Biscotasi Lake
- Biscuit Lake
- Bisect Lake
- Bishop Lake (Nipissing District)
- Bishop Lake (White Otter River, Thunder Bay District)
- Bishop Lake (Cochrane District)
- Bishop Lake (Frontenac County)
- Bishop Lake (Bishop Creek, Thunder Bay District)
- Bishops Lake
- Bisk Lake
- Bissett Lake
- Bissonnette Lake
- Bit Lake (Nipissing District)
- Bit Lake (Rainy River District)
- Bitch Lake
- Bitchu Lake
- Bite Lake (Biff Lake, Thunder Bay District)
- Bite Lake (Bite Creek, Thunder Bay District)
- Bithrey Lake
- Biting Lake
- Bitten Lake
- Bitter Lake
- Bittern Lake (Rainy River District)
- Bittern Lake (Parry Sound District)
- Bittern Lake (Cochrane District)
- Bittern Lake (Thunder Bay District)
- Bittern Lake (Algoma District)
- Bittern Lake (Sudbury District)
- Bivo Lake
- Bivouac Lake (Haliburton County)
- Bivouac Lake (Kenora District)
- Biz Lake
- Bizhiw Lake
- Biznar Lake

== Bl ==
- Black Bass Lake
- Black Bear Lake
- Black Beaver Lake (Lessard Township, Algoma District)
- Black Beaver Lake (Kenora District)
- Black Beaver Lake (Greenwood Township, Algoma District)
- Black Beaver Lake (Beaton Township, Algoma District)
- Black Birch Lake
- Black Donald Lake
- Black Duck Lake
- Black Feather Lake
- Black Fox Lake (Thunder Bay District)
- Black Fox Lake (Algoma District)
- Black Lake (Minden Hills)
- Black Lake (Lockeyer Township, Algoma District)
- Black Lake (Parry Sound District)
- Black Lake (Thunder Bay District)
- Black Lake (Peterborough County)
- Black Lake (Lanark County)
- Black Lake (Lake of Bays)
- Black Lake (Central Frontenac)
- Black Lake (North Frontenac)
- Black Lake (Sioux Narrows-Nestor Falls)
- Black Lake (Brougham Township, Greater Madawaska)
- Black Lake (Barager Township, Algoma District)
- Black Lake (LeCaron Township, Algoma District)
- Black Lake (Portland Township, South Frontenac)
- Black Lake (Grey County)
- Black Lake (Bedford Township, South Frontenac)
- Black Lake (Bagot Township, Greater Madawaska)
- Black Lake (Rainy River District)
- Black Lake (Marchington River), Kenora District
- Black Lake (Muskoka Lakes)
- Black Lake (Cochrane District)
- Black Lake (Spanish)
- Black Lake (Dysart et al)
- Black Lake (Stormont, Dundas and Glengarry United Counties)
- Black Lake (Blind River)
- Black Lakes
- Black Mandyn Lake
- Black Mountain Lake
- Black Oak Lake
- Black Sturgeon Lake
- Black Sturgeon Lakes
- Black Trout Lake
- Black's Lake
- Blackbass Lake (Lennox and Addington County)
- Blackbass Lake (Nipissing District)
- Blackbear Lake (Swan Lake, Kenora District)
- Blackbear Lake (Trout Lake, Kenora District)
- Blackberry Lake (Haliburton County)
- Blackberry Lake (Parry Sound District)
- Blackbill Lake
- Blackbirch Lake
- Blackbird Lake
- Blackbluff Lake
- Blackburn Lake (Cochrane District)
- Blackburn Lake (Timiskaming District)
- Blackcat Lake
- Blackduck Lake
- Blackett Lake
- Blackfish Lake
- Blackfox Lake (Nipissing District)
- Blackfox Lake (Timiskaming District)
- Blackfox Lake (Kenora District)
- Blackie's Lake
- Blackington Lake
- Blackmoore Lake
- Blackmud Lake
- Blackout Lake
- Blackpelt Lake
- Blackspruce Lake
- Blackstar Lake
- Blackstone Lake (Kenora District)
- Blackstone Lake (Rainy River District)
- Blackstone Lake (Parry Sound District)
- Blackthorn Lake
- Blackwater Lake (Thunder Bay District)
- Blackwater Lake (Whitefish Lake 6)
- Blackwater Lake (Cochrane District)
- Blackwater Lake (Stobie Township, Sudbury District)
- Blackwater Lake (Warren Township, Sudbury District)
- Blackwater Lake (Parry Sound District)
- Blackwell Lake (Muskoka District)
- Blackwell Lake (Timiskaming District)
- Blades Lake
- Blair Lake (Thunder Bay District)
- Blair Lake (Sudbury District)
- Blair Lake (Kenora District)
- Blair Lake (Parry Sound District)
- Blairs Lake
- Blake Lake (Manitoulin District)
- Blake Lake (Timiskaming District)
- Blake Lake (Kenora District)
- Blakelock Lake
- Blakely Lake
- Blakes Lake
- Blanchard Lake
- Blanchards Lake
- Blanche Lake (Timiskaming District)
- Blanche Lake (Algoma District)
- Blanco Lake
- Bland Lake
- Blank Lake
- Blanket Lake
- Blasko Lake
- Blay Lake
- Blende Lake
- Blimkie Lake
- Blind Beaver Lake
- Blind Lake (Frontenac County)
- Blind Lake (Peterborough County)
- Blind Lake (Algoma District)
- Blind Lake (Renfrew County)
- Blind Lake (Huron County)
- Blindfold Lake
- Blinko Lake
- Bliss Lake (Rainy River District)
- Bliss Lake (Thunder Bay District)
- Bliss Lake (Sudbury District)
- Blithfield Long Lake
- Blob Lake
- Bloch Lake
- Block Lake
- Block's Pond
- Blockville Lake
- Blonde Lake
- Blondin Lake
- Blood Lake
- Bloody Lake
- Bloom Lake
- Bloomfield Mill Pond
- Bloor Lake
- Blossom Lake
- Blotter Lake (Haliburton County)
- Blotter Lake (Thunder Bay District)
- Blount Lake
- Blowdown Lake (Nipissing District)
- Blowdown Lake (Algoma District)
- Blowing Lake
- Blowout Lake
- Bloxham Lake
- Bludgeon Lake
- Blue Cedar Lake
- Blue Chalk Lake
- Blue Coat Lakes
- Blue Goose Lake
- Blue Hawk Lake
- Blue Heaven Lake
- Blue Lagoon
- Blue Lake (Brant County)
- Blue Lake (North Frontenac)
- Blue Lake (Clute Township, Cochrane District)
- Blue Lake (South Frontenac)
- Blue Lake (Seguin)
- Blue Lake (McCaul Township, Rainy River District)
- Blue Lake (Algoma District)
- Blue Lake (Kearney)
- Blue Lake (East Burpee Township, Whitestone)
- Blue Lake (Hagerman Township, Whitestone)
- Blue Lake (Whitesand River, Thunder Bay District)
- Blue Lake (Kenora District)
- Blue Lake (Thompson Lake, Rainy River District)
- Blue Lake (Greenstone)
- Blue Lake (Sudbury District)
- Blue Lake (Bishop Township, Nipissing District)
- Blue Lake (Peterborough County)
- Blue Lake (McAuslan Township, Nipissing District)
- Blue Lake (Timmins)
- Blue Pine Lake
- Blue Sea Lakes
- Blue Sky Lake
- Blue Springs Pond
- Blue-winged Teal Lake
- Bluebeard Lake
- Bluebell Lake (Nipissing District)
- Bluebell Lake (Kenora District)
- Bluebelle Lake
- Blueberry Lake (Roughrock Lake, Kenora District)
- Blueberry Lake (Hodgins Lake, Kenora District)
- Blueberry Lake (Wild Lake, Kenora District)
- Blueberry Lake (Nipissing District)
- Blueberry Lake (Haliburton County)
- Blueberry Lake (Algoma District)
- Blueberry Lake (Lanark County)
- Blueberry Lake (Frontenac County)
- Blueberry Lake (Sudbury District)
- Blueberry Lake (Timiskaming District)
- Blueberry Lake (Cochrane District)
- Bluebill Lake (Thunder Bay District)
- Bluebill Lake (Nipissing District)
- Bluebird Lake (Algoma District)
- Bluebird Lake (Thunder Bay District)
- Bluebird Lake (Nipissing District)
- Bluebottle Lake
- Blueboy Lake
- Blueglass Lake
- Bluegoose Lake
- Bluejay Lake (Cochrane District)
- Bluejay Lake (Thunder Bay District)
- Bluejay Lake (Nipissing District)
- Blues Lake
- Bluesea Lake
- Bluesky Lake
- Bluesucker Lake
- Bluett Lake
- Bluewater Lake
- Bluewater Lakes
- Bluff Lake (Thunder Bay District)
- Bluff Lake (Hastings County)
- Bluff Lake (Stobie Township, Sudbury District)
- Bluff Lake (Tilton Township, Sudbury District)
- Bluff Lake (Algoma District)
- Bluff Lake (Kenora District)
- Bluff Pond
- Bluffpoint Lake
- Bluffy Lake (Kenora District)
- Bluffy Lake (Thunder Bay District)
- Blunder Lake
- Blush Lake
- Blyth Lake

== Bo–Bob ==
- Bo Lake
- Boat Lake (Algoma District)
- Boat Lake (Kenora District)
- Boat Lake (Bruce County)
- Boat Lake (Thunder Bay District)
- Bob Chips Lake
- Bob Lake (Nipissing District)
- Bob Lake (Algoma District)
- Bob Lake (Parry Sound District)
- Bob Lake (Scotia Township, Sudbury District)
- Bob Lake (Van Horne Township, Kenora District)
- Bob Lake (MacMurchy Township, Sudbury District)
- Bob Lake (Norm Lake, Kenora District)
- Bob Lake (Haliburton County)
- Bob's Lake (Cochrane District)
- Bob's Lake (Hastings County)
- Bob's Lake (Parry Sound District)
- Bobalong Lake
- Bobbie Lake
- Bobcam Lake
- Bobcat Lake
- Bobo Lake
- Bobowash Lake
- Bobs Lake (Renfrew County)
- Bobs Lake (North Frontenac)
- Bobs Lake (Sudbury District)
- Bobs Lake (Cochrane District)
- Bobs Lake (South Frontenac)
- Bobsled Lake
- Bobtail Lake (Sudbury District)
- Bobtail Lake (Timiskaming District)
- Bobwhite Lake

== Boc–Bom ==
- Bock Lake (Algoma District)
- Bock Lake (Rainy River District)
- Bodell Lake
- Bodina Lake
- Bodkin Lake
- Bodner Lake
- Boehmes Pond
- Boer Lake
- Boffin Lake
- Bog Lake (Corbiere Township, Algoma District)
- Bog Lake (Kenora District)
- Bog Lake (Peterborough County)
- Bog Lake (Rainy River District)
- Bog Lake (Johnson)
- Bog Lake (Keating Additional Township, Algoma District)
- Bog Pond
- Bogart Lake
- Bogert Lake
- Boggy Lake (Nipissing District)
- Boggy Lake (Thunder Bay District)
- Boggy Pond
- Bogie Lake
- Bogle Lake
- Bogus Lake
- Boice Lake
- Boil Lake
- Lac du Bois Dur
- Boisey Lake
- Boisvert Lake
- Boivin Lake (Sudbury District)
- Boivin Lake (Nipissing District)
- Bojack Lake
- Bolan Lake
- Boland Lake (Algoma District)
- Boland Lake (Nipissing District)
- Boland Lake (Timiskaming District)
- Boland's Lake
- Bolands Lake
- Bold Lake (Rainy River District)
- Bold Lake (Thunder Bay District)
- Bolduc Lake
- Bolger Lake (Parry Sound District)
- Bolger Lake (Peterborough County)
- Bolger's Lake
- Boling Lake
- Bolio Lake
- Bolkow Lake
- Bolster Lake
- Bolt Lake
- Bolton Lake (Kenora District)
- Bolton Lake (Timiskaming District)
- Bolton Lake (Cochrane District)
- Bolton Lakes
- Bompas Lake

== Bon–Boy ==
- Bon Echo Lake
- Bonamico Lake
- Bonanza Lake (Sudbury District)
- Bonanza Lake (Kenora District)
- Bonar Lake
- Bonasa Lake
- Bond Lake (York Region)
- Bond Lake (Rioux Township, Algoma District)
- Bond Lake (Wawa)
- Bond Lake (Timiskaming District)
- Bondy Lake
- Bone Lake (Timiskaming District)
- Bone Lake (Rainy River District)
- Bone Lake (Haliburton County)
- Bone Lake (Brule Township, Algoma District)
- Bone Lake (Bayfield Township, Algoma District)
- Bone Lake (Tupper Township, Algoma District)
- Bonesteel Lake
- Bonfield Lake
- Bonhomme Lake
- Bonis Lake
- Bonita Lake
- Bonne Lake
- Bonnechere Lake
- Bonnell Lake
- Bonner Lake (Cochrane District)
- Bonner Lake (Thunder Bay District)
- Bonnet Lake (Algoma District)
- Bonnet Lake (Kenora District)
- Bonnie Lake (Thunder Bay District)
- Bonnie Lake (Muskoka District)
- Bonsall Lake
- Boobus Lake
- Boodis Lake
- Booger Lake
- Book Lake (Algoma District)
- Book Lake (Kenora District)
- Boom Lake (Nipissing District)
- Boom Lake (Algoma District)
- Boom Lake (Cochrane District)
- Boom Lake (Thunder Bay District)
- Boomer Lake (Kenora District)
- Boomer Lake (Ball Lake, Thunder Bay District)
- Boomer Lake (Rabbitbelly Lake, Thunder Bay District)
- Boomerang Lake (Timiskaming District)
- Boomerang Lake (Thunder Bay District)
- Boomerang Lake (Sudbury District)
- Boomerang Lake (Winkler Township, Algoma District)
- Boomerang Lake (Walls Township, Algoma District)
- Boon Lake
- Boot Lake (Gibson Township, Georgian Bay)
- Boot Lake (Jackson Township, Algoma District)
- Boot Lake (Preston Township, Nipissing District)
- Boot Lake (Timiskaming District)
- Boot Lake (Kawartha Lakes)
- Boot Lake (Reilly Township, Algoma District)
- Boot Lake (Butler Township, Nipissing District)
- Boot Lake (Greater Sudbury)
- Boot Lake (Redditt Township, Kenora District)
- Boot Lake (Arden Township, Sudbury District)
- Boot Lake (Press Lake, Kenora District)
- Boot Lake (Tadpole Lake, Kenora District)
- Boot Lake (Baxter Township, Georgian Bay)
- Boot Lake (Rainy River District)
- Boot Lake (Kagiano River, Thunder Bay District)
- Boot Lake (Chaplin Township, Sudbury District)
- Boot Lake (Eula Lake, Thunder Bay District)
- Bootee Lake (Nipissing District)
- Bootee Lake (Algoma District)
- Booth Lake (Blyth Township, Nipissing District)
- Booth Lake (Preston Township, Nipissing District)
- Bootleg Lake (Rainy River District)
- Bootleg Lake (Sudbury District)
- Booty Lake
- Bopeep Lake
- Borden Lake (Timiskaming District)
- Borden Lake (Sudbury District)
- Border Lake
- Borderline Lake
- Borel Lake
- Borgford Lake
- Borland Lake
- Bornite Lake
- Borthwick Lake
- Borutski Lake
- Borzoi Lake
- Boshkung Lake
- Bosley Pond
- Boss Lake (Parry Sound District)
- Boss Lake (Garden River 14)
- Boss Lake (Meath Township, Algoma District)
- Bostebel Lake
- Boston Lake
- Bostwick Lake (Kenora District)
- Bostwick Lake (Renfrew County)
- Boswell Lake
- Bosworth Lake
- Botanist Lake
- Botha Lake (Sudbury District)
- Botha Lake (Timiskaming District)
- Botham Lake
- Bothnia Lake
- Botink Lake
- Botsford Lake
- Bott's Lake
- Bottle Bay Lake
- Bottle Lake (Rabazo Township, Algoma District)
- Bottle Lake (Rainy River District)
- Bottle Lake (Lanark County)
- Bottle Lake (White River)
- Bottle Lake (Havelock-Belmont-Methuen)
- Bottle Lake (Parry Sound District)
- Bottle Lake (McMahon Township, Algoma District)
- Bottle Lake (Trent Lakes)
- Bottley Lake
- Bottom Lake (Sudbury District)
- Bottom Lake (Nipissing District)
- Bouchard Lake (Timmins)
- Bouchard Lake (O'Brien Township, Cochrane District)
- Bouchard Lake (Ledger Township, Thunder Bay District)
- Bouchard Lake (Sudbury District)
- Bouchard Lake (Algoma District)
- Bouchard Lake (Bryant Township, Thunder Bay District)
- Boucher Lake (Sudbury District)
- Boucher Lake (Kenora District)
- Boucher Lake (Greater Sudbury)
- Boucher Lake (Timiskaming District)
- Boucher Lake (Nipissing District)
- Bouck Pond
- Bough Lake
- Boughton Lake
- Bougie Lake
- Bouillon Lake (Biggar Township, Nipissing District)
- Bouillon Lake (Calvin)
- Boulay Lake
- Boulder Lake (Kenora District)
- Boulder Lake (Thunder Bay District)
- Boulder Lake (Muskego Township, Sudbury District)
- Boulder Lake (Hendrie Township, Sudbury District)
- Boulder Lake (Algoma District)
- Boulder Lake (Rainy River District)
- Boulevard Lake
- Boulter Lake (Hastings County)
- Boulter Lake (Nipissing District)
- Boulton Lake
- Boumage Lake
- Bound Lake
- Boundary Lake (Rasin Creek, Kenora District)
- Boundary Lake (Menard Township, Algoma District)
- Boundary Lake (Haughton Township, Algoma District)
- Boundary Lake (Muskoka District)
- Boundary Lake (Blind River)
- Boundary Lake (GTP Block 8 Township, Kenora District)
- Boundary Lake (Duncan Township, Algoma District)
- Boundary Lake (Point Lake, Kenora District)
- Boundary Lake (Laidlaw Township, Cochrane District)
- Boundary Lake (Spanish-Sable Rivers)
- Boundary Lake (St-Louis Township, Sudbury District)
- Boundary Lake (Timmins)
- Boundary Lake (Parry Sound District)
- Boundary Lake (Hastings County)
- Boundary Lake (Elbow Lake, Thunder Bay District)
- Boundary Lake (Rainy River District)
- Boundary Lake (Huffman Township, Sudbury District)
- Boundary Lake (Killarney)
- Boundary Lake (Joynt Township, Thunder Bay District)
- Boundary Lake (Renfrew County)
- Boundary Lakes
- Bourassa Lake
- Bourdon Lake
- Bourgeois Lake
- Bourinot Lake
- Bourke Lake
- Bourzk Lake
- Lac Bouts
- Bouzan Lake
- Bovin Lake
- Bovril Lake
- Bow Lake (Otoskwin River, Kenora District)
- Bow Lake (Peterborough County)
- Bow Lake (Sudbury District)
- Bow Lake (Lanark County)
- Bow Lake (Hastings County)
- Bow Lake (Little Turtle River, Thunder Bay District)
- Bow Lake (Haliburton County)
- Bow Lake (Algoma District)
- Bow Lake (Cochrane District)
- Bowcott Lake
- Bowden Lake
- Bowen Lake
- Bowen Pond
- Bower Lake (Cochrane District)
- Bower Lake (Nipissing District)
- Bowern Lake
- Bowers Lake
- Bowes Lake
- Bowl Lake (Sudbury District)
- Bowl Lake (Thunder Bay District)
- Bowland Lake
- Bowler Lake
- Bowley Lake
- Bowman Lake (Kenora District)
- Bowman Lake (Algoma District)
- Bowsfield Lake
- Bowstring Lake
- Box Lake (Ogoki River, Thunder Bay District)
- Box Lake (Syine Township, Thunder Bay District)
- Box Lake (Rainy River District)
- Box Lake (Sauerbrei Lake, Thunder Bay District)
- Boxer Lake
- Boy Lake
- Boy Scout Lake
- Boyce Lake (Nipissing District)
- Boyce Lake (Rainy River District)
- Boyce Lake (Kenora District)
- Boyd Lake (Parry Sound District)
- Boyd Lake (Cochrane District)
- Boyd Lake (Grey County)
- Boyd Lake (Sudbury District)
- Boyd Lake (Timiskaming District)
- Boyd Lake (Thunder Bay District)
- Boyd Lake (Lanark County)
- Boyd Lake (Nipissing District)
- Boyden Lake
- Boyea Lake
- Boyer Lake (Timiskaming District)
- Boyer Lake (Kenora District)
- Boyer Lake (Thunder Bay District)
- Boyer Lake (Algoma District)
- Boyes Lake
- Boyle Lake (Boyle Township, Cochrane District)
- Boyle Lake (Algoma District)
- Boyle Lake (Nassau Township, Cochrane District)
- Boyne Lake
- Boys Lake

== Bra–Bri ==
- Brac Lake
- Brace Lake (Timiskaming District)
- Brace Lake (Thunder Bay District)
- Bradburn Lake (Kenora District)
- Bradburn Lake (Cochrane District)
- Bradburn Lakes
- Bradden Lake
- Bradette Lake
- Bradford Lakes
- Bradfords Lake
- Bradley Lake (Frontenac County)
- Bradley Lake (Thunder Bay District)
- Bradley Lake (Kenora District)
- Bradley Lake (Hastings County)
- Bradley Lake (Cochrane District)
- Bradshaw Lake
- Brady Lake (Haliburton County)
- Brady Lake (Greater Sudbury)
- Brady Lake (Frontenac County)
- Brady Lake (Knight Township, Timiskaming District)
- Brady Lake (Coleman)
- Brady Lake (Sudbury District)
- Bragg Lake (Cochrane District)
- Bragg Lake (Sudbury District)
- Braggan Lake
- Bragh Lake
- Braidwood Lake
- Brain Lake
- Brampton Lake
- Branch Lake
- Brandon Lake
- Brandy Lake (Thunder Bay District)
- Brandy Lake (Muskoka District)
- Brandy Lake (Lanark County)
- Branstrom Lake
- Brant Lake (Palmer Township, Algoma District)
- Brant Lake (Beauparlant Township, Algoma District)
- Brant Lake (Nipissing District)
- Brant Lake (Lalibert Township, Algoma District)
- Brasees Lake
- Brash Lake
- Brass Lake
- Brave Lake
- Brawny Lake
- Bray Lake (Timiskaming District)
- Bray Lake (Parry Sound District)
- Bray Lake (Cochrane District)
- Bray Lake (Thunder Bay District)
- Brayley Lake
- Brazeau Lake
- Brazil Lake
- Bread Lake
- Breadalbane Lake
- Breadner Lake
- Breakneck Lake
- Breben Lake
- Brebeuf Lake
- Breck Lake (Usnac Township, Algoma District)
- Breck Lake (Roy Township, Algoma District)
- Breckenridge Lake
- Breeches Lake
- Breen Lake
- Breeze Lake
- Breezy Lake (Nipissing District)
- Breezy Lake (Thunder Bay District)
- Bregent Lake
- Bremner Lake (Cochrane District)
- Bremner Lake (Algoma District)
- Bren Lake
- Brennan Lake (Greater Madawaska)
- Brennan Lake (Sudbury District)
- Brennan Lake (Petawawa)
- Brennan Lake (North Onaman River, Thunder Bay District)
- Brennan Lake (Timiskaming District)
- Brennan Lake (Allan Water, Thunder Bay District)
- Brennan Lake (Parry Sound District)
- Brent Lake
- Brenton Lake
- Bresnahan Lake (Kenora District)
- Bresnahan Lake (Hastings County)
- Bressette Lake
- Brethour Lake
- Brett Lake (Sudbury District)
- Brett Lake (Timiskaming District)
- Brett Lake (Thunder Bay District)
- Brett Lake (Hastings County)
- Bretz Lake
- Brewer Lake (Nipissing District)
- Brewer Lake (Rainy River District)
- Brewer Lake (Frontenac County)
- Brewer Park Pond
- Brewery Lake
- Brewster Lake
- Brewster's Lake
- Brian Lake (Kenora District)
- Brian Lake (Algoma District)
- Briarcliffe Lake
- Bridge Lake (Parry Sound District)
- Bridge Lake (Kenora District)
- Bridge Lake (Algoma District)
- Bridge Pond
- Bridget Lake (Kenora District)
- Bridget Lake (White River)
- Bridget Lake (Rabazo Township, Algoma District)
- Bridle Lake
- Brief Lake
- Brigam Lake
- Briggs Lake (Kenora District)
- Briggs Lake (Sudbury District)
- Brigham Lake
- Bright Lake (Thunder Bay District)
- Bright Lake (Haliburton County)
- Bright Lake (Algoma District)
- Bright Lake (Parry Sound District)
- Brightsand Lake
- Brightwater Lake
- Brigstocke Lake
- Brik Lake
- Brill Lake
- Brilliant Lake
- Brim Lake
- Brimson Lake
- Brink Lake
- Brinka Lake
- Brinklow Lake
- Brinnie Lake
- Brisbois Pond
- Brislan Lake
- Brisson Lake
- Bristol Lake
- Britain Lake
- Britches Lake
- Britchless Lake
- British Lake
- Britton Lake

== Broa–Brom ==
- Broad Lake
- Broadbent Lake
- Broadcast Lake
- Broadley Lake
- Broadside Lake
- Broadsword Lake
- Broadtail Lake
- Broadwell Lake
- Lac Brochet (Sudbury District)
- Lac Brochet (Cochrane District)
- Lac à Brochets
- Brock Lake (Sudbury District)
- Brock Lake (Kenora District)
- Brock Lake (Renfrew County)
- Brock Lake (Parry Sound District)
- Brock Lakes
- Brocket Lake
- Brockway Lake
- Broddy Lake
- Brodeur Lake
- Brodill Lake
- Broke Lake
- Broken Paddle Lake
- Broken Shoe Lake
- Broker Lake
- Bromley Lake

== Bron–Brou ==
- Bronson Lake (Sudbury District)
- Bronson Lake (Nipissing District)
- Bronson Lake (Hastings County)
- Brook Lake (Algoma District)
- Brook Lake (Lanark County)
- Brook Lake (Thunder Bay District)
- Brookdale Pond
- Brooks Lake (Lennox and Addington County)
- Brooks Lake (Hastings County)
- Brooks Lake (Kenora District)
- Brooks Lake (Muskoka District)
- Brooks Lake (Algoma District)
- Brooks Lake (Cochrane District)
- Broom Lake (Thunder Bay District)
- Broom Lake (Nipissing District)
- Brophy Lake (Thunder Bay District)
- Brophy Lake (Nipissing District)
- Brophys Lake
- Brothers Lake
- Brotherson's Lake
- Brotske Lake
- Lac à Brouard
- Brough Lake
- Brougham Lake
- Broughton Lake
- Bround Lake
- Brouse Lake (Kenora District)
- Brouse Lake (Thunder Bay District)
- Brouse Pond

== Brow ==
- Brow Lake
- Brown Bear Lake
- Brown Lake (Durham Region)
- Brown Lake (Colquhoun Township, Cochrane District)
- Brown Lake (Kenora District)
- Brown Lake (Thunder Bay District)
- Brown Lake (Squirrel River, Cochrane District)
- Brown Lake (Root Township, Algoma District)
- Brown Lake (Rainy River District)
- Brown Lake (Nipissing District)
- Brown Lake (Sayer Township, Algoma District)
- Brown Lake (Timmins)
- Brown Trout Lake (Sioux Narrows-Nestor Falls)
- Brown Trout Lake (Trout Lake, Kenora District)
- Brown's Lake
- Brownbear Lake
- Browne Lake
- Brownie Lake (Kenora District)
- Brownie Lake (Nipissing District)
- Browning Lake
- Brownings Pond
- Brownlee Lake
- Brownley Lake
- Browns Lake (Haliburton County)
- Browns Lake (Renfrew County)
- Browns Lake (Nipissing District)
- Browns Lake (Kawartha Lakes)
- Browns Lake (Lennox and Addington County)
- Brownstone Lake
- Browse Lake

== Bru–Bry ==
- Bruce Lake (Shingwaukonce Township, Algoma District)
- Bruce Lake (Muskoka District)
- Bruce Lake (Rambault Township, Algoma District)
- Bruce Lake (Dowsley Township, Algoma District)
- Bruce Lake (Nicol Township, Timiskaming District)
- Bruce Lake (Kenny Township, Nipissing District)
- Bruce Lake (Parry Sound District)
- Bruce Lake (Kenora District)
- Bruce Lake (Fripp Township, Algoma District)
- Bruce Lake (Peck Township, Nipissing District)
- Bruce Pond
- Bruchardt Pond
- Brucite Lake
- Brue Lake
- Bruin Lake
- Lac Brulé
- Brule Lake (Frontenac County)
- Brule Lake (Haley Lake, Griffith Township, Greater Madawaska)
- Brule Lake (Madawaska Valley)
- Brule Lake (McDougalls Creek, Griffith Township, Greater Madawaska)
- Brûlé Lake (Thunder Bay District)
- Brûlé Lake (Hunter Township, Nipissing District)
- Brûlé Lake (Stewart Township, Nipissing District)
- Brumal Lake
- Brundrit Lake
- Brunelle Lake
- Brunette Lake
- Brunner Lake
- Bruno Lake
- Brunswick Lake
- Brunton Lake
- Brusaw Lake
- Brush Lake (Parry Sound District)
- Brush Lake (Kawartha Lakes)
- Brush Lake (Reef Lake, Thunder Bay District)
- Brush Lake (Brush Creek, Thunder Bay District)
- Brush Lake (Timiskaming District)
- Brush Lakes
- Brute Lake
- Brutus Lake (Moen Township, Sudbury District)
- Brutus Lake (Brutus Township, Sudbury District)
- Bryan Lake
- Bryce Lake (Cochrane District)
- Bryce Lake (Sudbury District)
- Bryn Lake

== Bu ==
- Bubble Lake
- Buch Lake
- Buchan Lake
- Buchanan Lake (Cochrane District)
- Buchanan Lake (Haliburton County)
- Buchanan Lake (Muskoka District)
- Buchanan Lake (Flindt River, Thunder Bay District)
- Buchanan Lake (Byron Township, Thunder Bay District)
- Buchanan Lake (Oxford County)
- Bucheski Lake
- Bucholtz Lake
- Buck Lake (North Frontenac)
- Buck Lake (Georgian Bay)
- Buck Lake (Sudbury District)
- Buck Lake (Kawartha Lakes)
- Buck Lake (Lunkie Township, Algoma District)
- Buck Lake (Central Frontenac)
- Buck Lake (Simcoe County)
- Buck Lake (Lake of Bays)
- Buck Lake (Killaloe, Hagarty and Richards)
- Buck Lake (Tudor and Cashel)
- Buck Lake (Gravenhurst)
- Buck Lake (Hastings Highlands)
- Buck Lake (McEwing Township, Algoma District)
- Buck Lake (South Frontenac)
- Buck Lake (Lennox and Addington County)
- Buck Lake (Kenora District)
- Buck Lake (McMurrich/Monteith)
- Buck Lake (Cecile Township, Thunder Bay District)
- Buck Lake (Brudenell, Lyndoch and Raglan)
- Buck Lake (Kearney)
- Buck Lake (Buck Creek, Thunder Bay District)
- Buck Pond
- Buck Shanty Lake
- Buckaday Lake
- Buckdeer Lake
- Bucke Lake
- Buckett Lake
- Buckhorn Lake (Muskoka District)
- Buckhorn Lake (Haliburton County)
- Buckhorn Lake (Peterborough County)
- Buckhorn Lake (Sudbury District)
- Buckingham Lake
- Buckingham Lakes
- Buckley Lake
- Buckram Lake
- Bucksaw Lake
- Buckshee Lake
- Buckshot Lake (Algoma District)
- Buckshot Lake (Sudbury District)
- Buckshot Lake (Frontenac County)
- Buckskin Lake (Highlands East)
- Buckskin Lake (Algonquin Highlands)
- Buckskin Lake (Renfrew County)
- Buckskin Lakes
- Buckwheat Lake
- Bucky Pond
- Bud Lake (Thunder Bay District)
- Bud Lake (Nipissing District)
- Bud Lake (Rainy River District)
- Bud Lake (Algoma District)
- Bud Lake (Sudbury District)
- Buda Lake
- Budall Lake
- Budarick Lake
- Budd Lake (Quill Township, Algoma District)
- Budd Lake (McEwing Township, Algoma District)
- Budd Lake (Sudbury District)
- Buddell Lake
- Buddy Lake
- Budworm Lake
- Buell Lake
- Buells Creek Reservoir
- Buff Lake
- Buffalo Island Lake
- Buffalo Lake
- Buffington Lake
- Bufflehead Lake
- Buffy Lake
- Bufo Lake
- Bug Lake (Gooch Creek, Kenora District)
- Bug Lake (Big Trout Lake, Kenora District)
- Bug Lake (Sioux Narrows-Nestor Falls)
- Bug Lake (Gullrock Lake, Kenora District)
- Bug Lake (Bug Creek, Kenora District)
- Bug Lake (Nipissing District)
- Bugbee Lake
- Buge Lake
- Bugg Lake
- Buhl Lake (Sudbury District)
- Buhl Lake (Thunder Bay District)
- Buie Lake
- Bukadawin Lake
- Bukemiga Lake
- Buker Lake
- Bukwaskeagog Lake
- Bulge Lake
- Bulging Lake
- Bull Lake (Sioux Narrows-Nestor Falls)
- Bull Lake (Sheppard Township, Sudbury District)
- Bull Lake (Varley Township, Algoma District)
- Bull Lake (Frontenac County)
- Bull Lake (Fox Creek, Kenora District)
- Bull Lake (Boon Township, Algoma District)
- Bull Lake (Thunder Bay District)
- Bull Lake (Turner Township, Sudbury District)
- Bullbat Lake
- Bulldozer Lake
- Buller Lake
- Bulley Lake
- Bullfrog Lake (Cochrane District)
- Bullfrog Lake (Algoma District)
- Bullfrog Pond
- Bullmoose Lake (Rainy River District)
- Bullmoose Lake (Thunder Bay District)
- Bullock Lake
- Bullring Lake
- Bullrush Lake
- Bulls Eye Lake
- Bullseye Lake (Kenora District)
- Bullseye Lake (Frontenac County)
- Bulpit Lake
- Bulrush Lake (Algoma District)
- Bulrush Lake (Kenora District)
- Bulsch Lake
- Bump Lake
- Bumpy Lake
- Bun Lake
- Bunchberry Lake
- Bundy Lake
- Bungy Lake
- Bunion Lake
- Bunn Lake
- Bunny Lake (Sioux Narrows-Nestor Falls)
- Bunny Lake (Algoma District)
- Bunny Lake (Rainy River District)
- Bunny Lake (Thunder Bay District)
- Bunny Lake (Leano Creek, Kenora District)
- Bunnyrabbit Lake
- Buntain Lake
- Bunting Lake
- Bunty Lake
- Bunyan Lake
- Bur Lake
- Burbee Lake
- Burbidge Lake
- Burbot Lake
- Burchell Lake
- Burd Lake
- Burden Lake (Algoma District)
- Burden Lake (Kenora District)
- Burditt Lake
- Burdock Lake
- Bures Lake
- Burgess Lake (Timiskaming District)
- Burgess Lake (Oxford County)
- Burk Lake (Thunder Bay District)
- Burk Lake (Timiskaming District)
- Burke Lake (Nipissing District)
- Burke Lake (Rainy River District)
- Burke Lake (Manitoulin District)
- Burke Lake (Kenora District)
- Burke Lake (Hastings County)
- Burke Pond
- Burl Lakes
- Burlap Lake
- Burley Lake
- Burling Lake
- Burn Lake
- Burnaby Lake (Thunder Bay District)
- Burnaby Lake (Nipissing District)
- Burness Lake
- Burnet Lake
- Burnett Lake (Parry Sound District)
- Burnett Lake (Manitoulin District)
- Burnett Lake (Algoma District)
- Burnetts Pond
- Burnfield Lake
- Burning Lake
- Burnish Lake
- Burns Lake (Greater Madawaska)
- Burns Lake (Varley Township, Algoma District)
- Burns Lake (Muskoka District)
- Burns Lake (Sudbury District)
- Burns Lake (Madawaska Valley)
- Burns Lake (Riggs Township, Algoma District)
- Burns Long Lake
- Burns Pond
- Burnside Lake (Thunder Bay District)
- Burnside Lake (Parry Sound District)
- Burnt Dam Lake
- Burnt Island Lake (Thunder Bay District)
- Burnt Island Lake (Nipissing District)
- Burnt Lake (Burton Township, Whitestone)
- Burnt Lake (Beaton Township, Algoma District)
- Burnt Lake (Viel Township, Algoma District)
- Burnt Lake (Nipissing District)
- Burnt Lake (Patterson Township, Parry Sound District)
- Burnt Lake (Kearney)
- Burnt Lake (East Burpee Township, Whitestone)
- Burnt Lake (Seguin)
- Burnt Lake (McConkey Township, Parry Sound District)
- Burnt Lake (Secord Township, Sudbury District)
- Burnt Lake (Royal Township, Algoma District)
- Burnt Lake (Delmage Township, Sudbury District)
- Burnt Lake (Kenora District)
- Burnt Point Lake
- Burnt Ridge Lake
- Burntbush Lake
- Burntrock Lake
- Burntroot Lake
- Burntshanty Lake
- Burntside Lake
- Burntwood Lake (Kenora District)
- Burntwood Lake (Sudbury District)
- Burr Lake (Kenora District)
- Burr Lake (Parry Sound District)
- Burr Lake (Algoma District)
- Burrell Lake
- Burridge Lake
- Burritt Lake
- Burrow Lake
- Burrows Lake (Thunder Bay District)
- Burrows Lake (Simcoe County)
- Burrows Lake (Algoma District)
- Burrows Lake (Sudbury District)
- Burslem Lake
- Burt Lake (Rainy River District)
- Burt Lake (Nipissing District)
- Burt Lake (Timiskaming District)
- Burton Lake (Sudbury District)
- Burton Lake (Rainy River District)
- Burton Lake (Kenora District)
- Burtt Lake (Algoma District)
- Burtt Lake (Thunder Bay District)
- Burwash Lake (Muskoka District)
- Burwash Lake (Sudbury District)
- Burwash Lake (Nipissing District)
- Burwash Lake (Malachi Township, Kenora District)
- Burwash Lake (Ryerson Creek, Kenora District)
- Bury Lake (Kenora District)
- Bury Lake (Thunder Bay District)
- Burying Lake
- Bus Lake
- Busby Lake
- Busch Lake (Rainy River District)
- Busch Lake (Parry Sound District)
- Bush Lake (Algoma District)
- Bush Lake (Thunder Bay District)
- Bush Lake (Cochrane District)
- Bush Lake (Nipissing District)
- Bush Pond
- Bushtail Lake
- Bushtrail Lake
- Bushwolf Lake
- Bushy Lake
- Business Lake
- Bussineau Lake
- Butchart Lake
- Butcher Lake
- Butcherhook Lake
- Butland Lake
- Butler Lake (Bradshaw Township, Kenora District)
- Butler Lake (Sudbury District)
- Butler Lake (Cochrane District)
- Butler Lake (Nipissing District)
- Butler Lake (Wabigoon Lake, Kenora District)
- Butson Lake
- Butt Lake
- Butter Lake (Kenora District)
- Butter Lake (Algoma District)
- Butter Tin Lake
- Butterfield Lake
- Butterfly Lake (Sioux Lookout)
- Butterfly Lake (Muskoka District)
- Butterfly Lake (Wawapus Creek, Kenora District)
- Butterill Lake
- Buttermilk Lake (Marmora and Lake)
- Buttermilk Lake (Limerick)
- Butternut Lake
- Butters Lake
- Button Lake (Thunder Bay District)
- Button Lake (Sudbury District)
- Buttonshoe Lake
- Buxus Lake
- Buzz Lake
- Buzzard Lake
- Buzzer Lake

== Bw–By ==
- Bwan Lake
- Bye Lake
- Byers Lake (Cochrane District)
- Byers Lake (Rainy River District)
- Byers Lake (Haliburton County)
- Byford Lake
- Byline Lake
- Byng Lake (Algoma District)
- Byng Lake (Timiskaming District)
- Byril Lake
- Byrne Lake (Parry Sound District)
- Byrne Lake (Kenora District)
- Byrnes Lake (Hanna Township, Cochrane District)
- Byrnes Lake (Algoma District)
- Byrnes Lake (Ridge River, Cochrane District)
- Byron Lake (Abotossaway Township, Algoma District)
- Byron Lake (Nebonaionquet Township, Algoma District)
