= Lai Neir =

Lai Neir may refer to:

- Lai Neir (Alp Flix), Sur, a lake in the Grisons, Switzerland ("black lake")

== See also ==
- Lai Nair, Tarasp
- Lej Nair (Bernina), Pontresina
- Lej Nair (Silvaplana)
- Black Lake (disambiguation)
