= Lej Nair =

Lej Nair may refer to:

- Lej Nair (Bernina), a lake in the Grisons, Switzerland
- Lej Nair (Silvaplana), a lake in the Grisons, Switzerland

== See also ==
- Lai Nair, Tarasp
- Lai Neir (Alp Flix), Sur
- Black Lake (disambiguation)
