= Bolton Lake =

Bolton Lake may refer to:

In Canada:

- Bolton Lake (British Columbia)
- Bolton Lake (Manitoba)
- Bolton Lake (New Brunswick)
- In Ontario
  - Bolton Lake (Cochrane District, Ontario)
  - Bolton Lake (Kenora District)
  - Bolton Lake (Timiskaming District)
- Bolton Lake (Saskatchewan)

== See also ==
- Bolton Lakes (Ontario)
