= Buckley Lake =

Buckley Lake may refer to:

- Buckley Lake (British Columbia), in Mount Edziza Provincial Park
- Buckley Lake (Ontario), in Peterborough County
