= Blos =

Blos is a surname. Notable people with the surname include:

- Anna Blos (1866–1933), German educator and politician
- Carl Blos (1860–1941), German painter
- Gabriel Blos (born 1989), Brazilian footballer
- Joan Blos (1928–2017), American writer and teacher
- Martina Blos (born 1957), German former sprinter
- Michael Blos (born 1976), German politician
- Peter Blos (1904–1997), German-American psychologist
- Wilhelm Blos (1849–1927), German politician

== See also ==
- Lai Blos, two small lakes in the Grisons, Switzerland
