= Big Rob =

Big Rob may refer to:

- Robert Feggans, bodyguard to the Jonas Brothers, Britney Spears, Demi Lovato, and Fifth Harmony
- Rob Terry (born 1980), Welsh professional wrestler

== See also ==
- Big Bob (disambiguation)
