= Black River (Kenora District) =

Black River rivière Black
- Location of the mouth of the Black River in Ontario

Location
- Country: Canada
- Province: Ontario
- Region: Northwestern Ontario
- District: Kenora
- Municipality: Sioux Narrows-Nestor Falls

Physical characteristics
- Source: Unnamed lake
  - location: Work Township
  - coordinates: 49°35′27″N 93°57′50″W
  - elevation: 378 m (1,240 ft)
- Mouth: Lake of the Woods
  - location: MacQuarrie Township
  - coordinates: 49°29′56″N 94°11′46″W
  - elevation: 322 m (1,056 ft)

Basin features
- River system: Nelson River

The Black River (French: rivière Black) is a river in the municipality of Sioux Narrows-Nestor Falls, Kenora District in Northwestern Ontario, Canada. It is part of the Hudson Bay drainage basin, and is a tributary of the Lake of the Woods.

== Course ==
The river begins at an unnamed lake in geographic Work Township and heads southwest through Ulster Lake and under Ontario Highway 71 to Black Lake. It continues southwest, passes into geographic MacQuarrie Township then Yellow Girl Bay 32B Indian Reserve (part of the Naotkamegwanning First Nation), and reaches its mouth at Long Bay on the northeast side of the Lake of the Woods. The Lake of the Woods flows via the Winnipeg River and the Nelson River to Hudson Bay.

== Tributaries ==
- Graphic Creek (right)
- Johnny Creek (left)

== See also ==
- List of rivers of Ontario

== Other external map sources ==
- Map 13 (PDF) (Map). 1 : 1,600,000. Official road map of Ontario. Ministry of Transportation of Ontario. 2010-01-01.
- Restructured municipalities - Ontario map #1 (Map). Restructuring Maps of Ontario. Ontario Ministry of Municipal Affairs and Housing. 2006. Archived from the original on 2012-05-05.
- Township of Sioux Narrows Nestor Falls - Schedule C (PDF) (Map). Official Plan - Land Use Designations. Municipality of Sioux Narrows-Nestor Falls. May 2007. Archived from the original (PDF) on 2015-07-07.
