= Lac Noir =

Lac Noir may refer to:

- Lac Noir (Vosges), a lake in Alsace, France
- Schwarzsee or Lac Noir, a lake in the canton of Fribourg, Switzerland
- Lac Noir, ex-USS Guyandot (AOG-16), a gasoline tanker of the United States Navy

== See also ==
- Black Lake (disambiguation)
