= Lake Tilden (Florida) =

- Location within Florida Location within the United States
- Location: Orange County, Florida
- Coordinates: 28.5193828°N 81.5934849°W
- Type: Natural freshwater lake
- Basin countries: United States
- Max. length: 2,080 ft (630 m)
- Max. width: 1,880 ft (570 m)
- Surface area: 40.16 acres (16.25 ha)
- Average depth: 10 ft (3.0 m)
- Water volume: 132,947,383 US gal (503,260,590 L; 110,701,854 imp gal)
- Surface elevation: ca. 98 ft (30 m)

Lake Tilden, also considered part of nearby Black Lake, is a natural freshwater lake on the west side of Orlando, Florida, in Orange County, Florida, United States. This lake, with some swampy shores, meets Black Lake on its northwest side. To the south side of the lake is Florida State Road 429, a toll highway. Residential housing developments are on the southwest and north sides of the lake. The entire lake is surrounded by private property, so there is no public access to this lake.

Compared to other lakes in the area, Lake Tilden is quite small, only having a surface area of about 40 acres. The lake's average depth is 10 ft, but its deepest point is 36 ft. This depth allows for many different species of wildlife and vegetation.

== Water quality ==
The water quality in Lake Tilden is very stable. Dating back to September 1, 1971, approximately 7,082 water samples have been collected from Lake Tilden, measured on a scale from 0 (highest quality) to 100 (lowest quality). The current water quality of Lake Tilden is 54, and has ranged from 38 to 65 since the first sample was collected in 1971. The limiting nutrient in Lake Tilden is phosphorus. The lake contains nitrogen, another nutrient required by plant life, and chlorophyll, which is a measure of algae abundance. Water clarity is also another feature of Lake Tilden, with the latest Secchi disk reading being 1.97 feet (0.60 m), with a historic range of 0.33 to 12 feet (0.10 to 3.66 m).

== Wildlife ==
The lake is home to many of Central Florida's native species. One of the most common species found in Lake Tilden is the largemouth bass, a common freshwater sport fishing species. The lake also has catfish, tilapia, and bass.

== Location ==
Lake Tilden is located at 28.5199° N, 81.5932° W. It is approximately 12 miles west-southwest of downtown Orlando. The area surrounding the lake is very industrialized, with many neighborhoods and shopping centers. Winter Garden Regional shopping center and Winter Garden Regal are two huge shopping centers within 2.5 miles. Windsor Park Golf Club is within 2 miles of the lake. These developments raise concern for the future of the water quality in Lake Tilden, due to the pesticides that golf courses use to fertilize the land, as well as the pollution that comes from shopping malls.
