= Coldwater River (Algoma District) =

- Location of the mouth of the Coldwater River in Ontario.

Location
- Country: Canada
- Province: Ontario
- Region: Northeastern Ontario
- District: Algoma
- Part: Algoma, Unorganized, North

Physical characteristics
- Source: Black Lake
  - location: Barager Township
  - coordinates: 47°35′59″N 84°42′20″W
  - elevation: 370 m (1,210 ft)
- Mouth: Lake Superior
  - location: Giles Township
  - coordinates: 47°28′05″N 84°47′17″W
  - elevation: 180 m (590 ft)

Basin features
- River system: Great Lakes Basin
- Tributaries
  - right: June Creek

The Coldwater River is a river in the Unorganized North Part of Algoma District in Northeastern Ontario, Canada. It is in the Great Lakes Basin, is a tributary of Lake Superior, and its entire course lies within Lake Superior Provincial Park.

== Course ==
The Coldwater River begins at Black Lake, in geographic Barager Township, and travels south through geographic Broome Township, and the southeast corner of geographic Brimbacombe Township before flowing into geographic Giles Township, where it takes in the right tributary June Creek, passes under Ontario Highway 17, and reaches its mouth at Lake Superior.

== Tributaries ==
- June Creek

== See also ==
- List of rivers of Ontario
