= Sharbot Lake Provincial Park =

Provincial park in Ontario, Canada

- IUCN category II (national park)
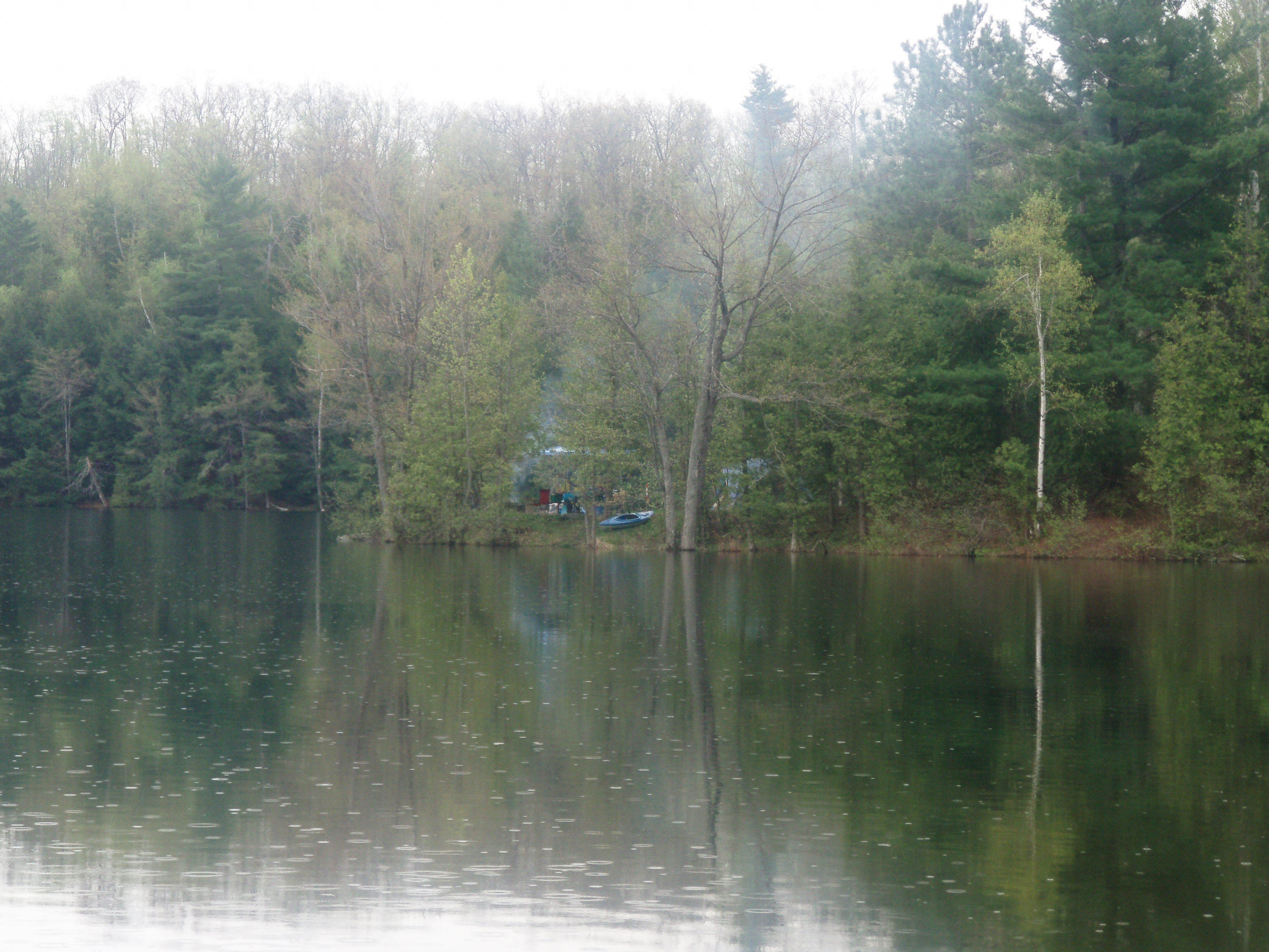
- Sharbot Lake camp site 121 (The Point) as seen from Black Lake

- Location within Southern Ontario
- Interactive map of Sharbot Lake Provincial Park
- Location: Frontenac County, Ontario, Canada
- Nearest city: Sharbot Lake, Ontario
- Coordinates: 44°46′17″N 76°43′31″W
- Area: 80 ha (198 acres)
- Established: 1958
- Visitors: 50,910 (in 2022)
- Governing body: Ontario Parks
- Website: www.ontarioparks.com/park/sharbotlake

Sharbot Lake Provincial Park is a park under the auspices of Ontario Parks in the municipality of Central Frontenac, Frontenac County in Eastern Ontario, Canada. The park has an area of 80 hectares (198 acres) and was established in 1958.

This recreation class campground has 194 camp sites, 178 of which are treed. In 2010 the campground hosted more than twenty-nine thousand visitors, of which more than twenty-six thousand were overnight campers. Although the park is on the northwest shore of Sharbot Lake, it is mostly along the shore line of the neighbouring Black Lake, having two sandy beaches on this latter lake.

Ontario Highway 7 parallels much of the park.

== See also ==
- List of Canadian provincial parks – for parks in other Canadian provinces
- List of Ontario parks
