= Mac Johnson Wildlife Area =

Wildlife conservation area in Ontario, Canada

Coordinates: 44.6293°N 75.7184°W

The Mac Johnson Wildlife Area (colloquially known as the Back Pond) is a 532-hectare (1,310-acre) wildlife area north of Brockville, Ontario, Canada, that includes wetland, fields, and forest land, as well as a reservoir that maintains water levels for the Buells Creek watershed flowing through the Township of Elizabethtown-Kitley and the City of Brockville. The wildlife area is managed by the Cataraqui Region Conservation Authority (CRCA). The area is open to visitors and offers 11 km (6.8 mi) of walking paths through woodland, wetland and open fields.

== History ==
Early settlement of the land comprising the future wildlife area occurred in the late 18th century to early 19th century, largely as the result of the potential for Buells Creek to power mills for industry. Settlement continued to expand for the next 100 years, and industry turned to the harvesting of peat moss, which required draining the marshlands. Eventually, the land was no longer suitable for harvesting peat moss, and further draining was attempted to create new agricultural areas. However, it was discovered that the soggy land would not support heavy objects, such as farm equipment and cattle, which are vital to agricultural growth. A 1958 report by the CRCA deemed the land a "floating bog". In 1967 the Broome-Runciman Dam was built to stabilize and regulate water flow in the area. From 1966 through 1970 the CRCA purchased the land surrounding Buells Creek and formed the wildlife area. Originally known as the Back Pond, the area was renamed by the CRCA in 1987 to recognize the conservation efforts of the early CRCA member Mac Johnson.
