= Big Bob =

Big Bob may refer to:

== People ==
- Robert Brady (criminal) (1904–1934), American bank robber
- "Big Bob" Carlisle, a regular audience member of the British show Al Murray's Happy Hour
- Bob Hazell (born 1959), Jamaican-born former footballer in the English Football League
- Bob Isbister (1885–1963), Canadian football player
- Bob Johnson (Australian footballer, born 1935) (1935–2001), Australian rules footballer
- Bob Lee (baseball) (1937–2020), American Major League Baseball pitcher
- Bob McLean (Australian footballer) (1914–1989), Australian rules footballer
- Robert Middleton (1911–1977), American actor
- Big Bob Windham, a ring name, along with Blackjack Mulligan, for professional wrestler Robert Windham (1942–2016)

== Fictional characters ==
- Robert "Big Bob" Belcher, Sr., a character in the animated television series Bob's Burgers
- Robert "Big Bob" Gupt, a character in the British soap opera Hollyoaks
- Bob "Big Bob" O'Hara, a character in the Scottish soap opera River City
- "Big Bob" Joylove, in the British sketch show Harry Enfield & Chums
- Robert "Big Bob" Pataki, a character in the animated television series Hey Arnold!
- Robert "Big Bob" Paulson, in the novel Fight Club and the film adaptation
- Big Bob, in the children's stories Bobobobs

== Other uses ==
- Big Bob, a sandwich offered by Brazilian fast food chain Bob's
- Big Bob, an outflow channel of Sturgeon Lake (Ontario), Canada
- Big Bob Lake, a lake in Ontario
- Big Bob, a 1954 novel by Georges Simenon
- "Big Bob", a season 3 episode of Rob & Big
- "Big Bob", a song by Bill Frisell from the 1999 album Ghost Town
- Big Bob, the 1962 and 1963 winner of the Lee Steere Stakes Australian Thoroughbred horse race
- Big Bob, name sometimes used to refer to the Bob Semple tank
- Big Bob, the cannon used in Paper Mario: The Thousand-Year Door
