= Little Yirkie Lake =

Lake in Ontario, Canada

- Location within Ontario
- Coordinates: 45.15°N 77.32°W
- Type: Glacial
- Primary inflows: One creek from Big Yirkie Lake
- Primary outflows: None
- Basin countries: Canada
- Max. length: 475 m (1,558 ft)
- Max. width: 100 m (330 ft)
- Residence time: None
- Surface elevation: 390 m (1,280 ft) above sea level
- Islands: None
- Settlements: None

Little Yirkie Lake is a small, bottle shaped lake in Lennox and Addington County, Ontario. It can be found on the north side of highway 28, near its larger counterpart, Big Yirkie Lake. The lake is small, measuring only 100 metres by 475 metres.
