= Black Lake (Eagle County, Colorado) =

- Black Lake #1
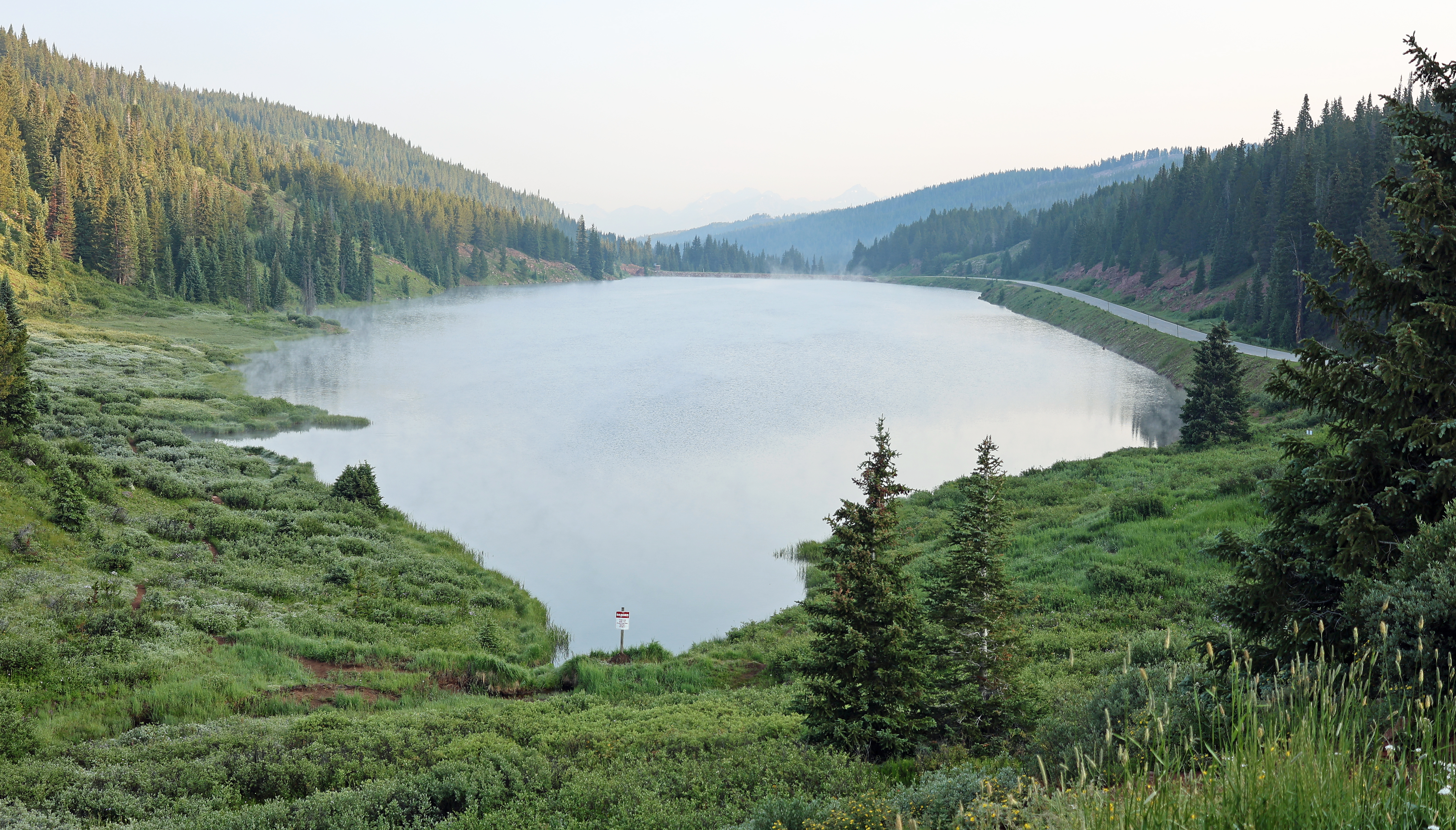
- The reservoir in 2024

- The reservoir's location in Colorado
- Location: Eagle
- Group: The Black Lakes
- Coordinates: 39°32′23.36″N 106°13′7.24″W
- Type: reservoir
- Primary inflows: Black Gore Creek
- Primary outflows: Black Gore Creek
- Basin countries: United States
- Managing agency: Eagle River Water & Sanitation District
- Built: 1939
- Water volume: 642 acre-feet (792,000 cubic meters)
- Surface elevation: 10,509 feet (3,203 meters)
- Frozen: Freezes in winter

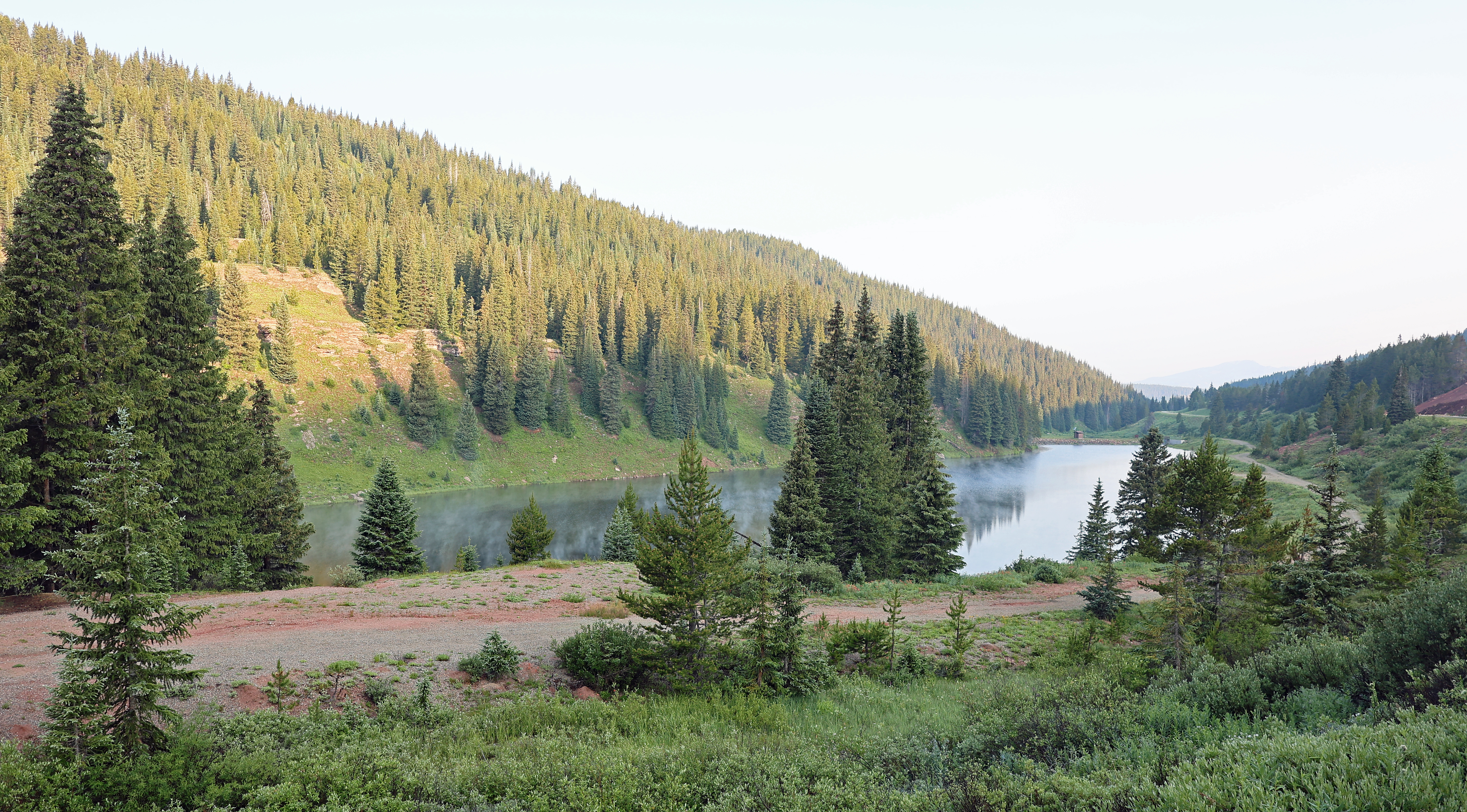
Black Lake #2

Black Lake is a reservoir at Vail Pass in Eagle County, Colorado. The reservoir collects and stores water for the Eagle River Water & Sanitation District. It lies at an elevation of over 10,000 feet (3,000 meters) and sits alongside Interstate 70.

== Dam ==
The dam, Black Lake #1 Dam, has NID ID CO02188 and is a 73-foot (22-meter) high earthen dam that can store up to 642 acre-feet (792,000 cubic meters) of water. It was built in 1939 and is 400 feet (120 meters) wide.

== Black Lake #2 ==
A second reservoir — Black Lake #2 — lies approximately 100 yards (91 meters) north of Black Lake #1 along the bike path on the west side of Interstate 70. Located at 39°32′53.86″N 106°13′23.16″W and at an elevation of 10,509 feet (3,203 meters), Black Lake #2 is smaller than Black Lake #1, with a storage capacity of 148 acre-feet (183,000 cubic meters) of water. Its 30-foot (9.1-meter) high dam is owned by Colorado Parks and Wildlife and was built in 1957.

== Recreation ==
Jointly, the two lakes are often referred to simply as "The Black Lakes." Both dams impound Black Gore Creek, a tributary of Gore Creek. The reservoirs are stocked twice yearly with rainbow trout, so they are popular with anglers. Black Lake #1 also has a fishing pier. In addition, the White River National Forest manages the Black Lakes Picnic Site, which includes the areas around both lakes.
