= Black Lake (Florida) =

Lake in Orange County, Florida, USA

Coordinates: 28°31′03″N 81°34′17″W

- Location within Florida Location within the United States
- Location: Winter Garden, Florida
- Basin countries: United States
- Max. length: 3,150 ft (960 m)
- Max. width: 1,875 ft (572 m)
- Surface area: 116 acres (47 ha)
- Average depth: 12 ft (3.7 m)
- Water volume: 582,100,992 US gal (2.20349195×10^{9} L; 484,700,469 imp gal)

Black Lake, connected to nearby Lake Tilden, is a 233-acre natural freshwater lake on the west side of Orlando, Florida, in Orange County, Florida, United States. This lake, with some swampy shores, meets Black Lake on its northwest side. To the south side of the lake is Florida State Road 429, a toll highway. Residential housing developments are on the southwest and north sides of the lake.

The entire lake is surrounded by private property, so there is no public access to this lake.

== Black Lake Preserve ==
In August 2026, the county opened a new 287-acre nature preserve, Black Lake Preserve, half a mile west of the lake. The eastern portion of the preserve borders the southern part of Black Lake, but is not publicly accessible. The western part of the preserve is publicly accessible and includes parking, several hiking trails, and a 500-foot wheelchair-accessible sidewalk.
