= Bamaji Lake =

Lake in Ontario, Canada

- Location within Ontario
- Location: Kenora District, Ontario
- Coordinates: 51°07′44″N 91°28′31″W
- Primary inflows: Bamaji Creek, Brokenmouth River, Cat River from North Bamaji Lake, channel from Fry Lake
- Primary outflows: Cat River
- Basin countries: Canada
- Max. length: 30 kilometres (18.6 mi)
- Max. width: 5 kilometres (3.1 mi)

Bamaji Lake is a lake in the Albany River and James Bay drainage basins in Kenora District, Ontario, Canada located about 120 kilometres (75 mi) north of Sioux Lookout. It is about 30 kilometres (19 mi) long and 5 kilometres (3.1 mi) wide at its widest, but typically only 1 kilometre (0.6 mi) wide.

The primary inflow, from North Bamaji Lake, and outflow, to Roadhouse Lake, is the Cat River, which flows into Lake St. Joseph and then via the Albany River to James Bay. Secondary inflows are Bamaji Creek, the Brokenmouth River, and an outlet channel from Fry Lake.

The Slate Falls First Nation and associated Slate Falls Airport are just to the north on North Bamaji Lake.

== See also ==
- List of lakes in Ontario
