= Schwarzsee (Blatten) =

Lake at Blatten in the Lötschental Valley, Switzerland

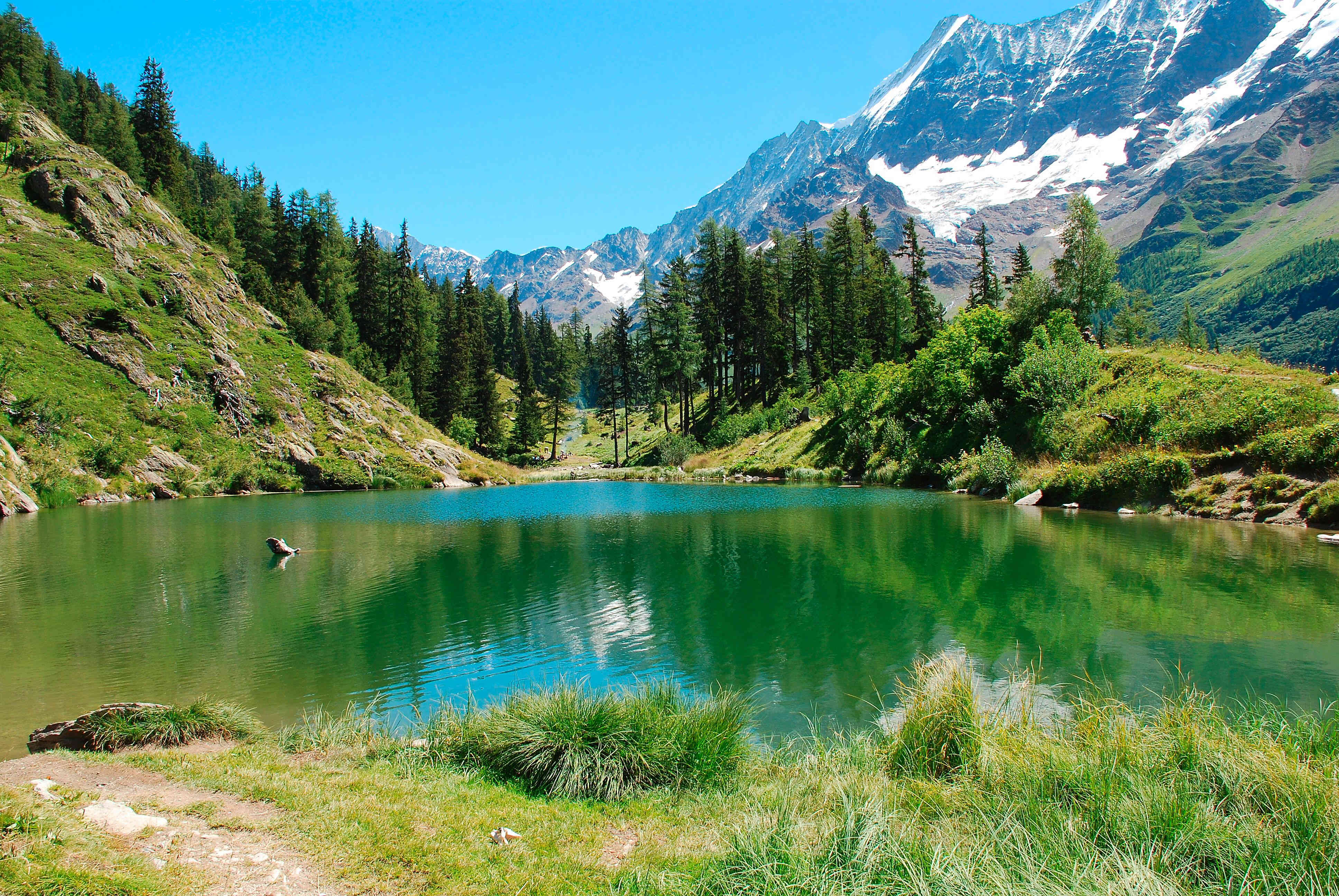

- Location within Canton of Valais Location within Switzerland Location within Alps
- Interactive map of Schwarzsee
- Location: Blatten, Valais
- Coordinates: 46°25′52″N 7°50′8″E
- Basin countries: Switzerland

Schwarzsee (literally "Black Lake") is a lake at Blatten in the Lötschental valley in the canton of Valais, Switzerland.
