= Buells Creek Reservoir =

Artificial lake in Ontario, Canada

- Location within Ontario
- Location: Mac Johnson Wildlife Area, Ontario, Canada
- Coordinates: 44.6235°N 75.7238°W
- Type: reservoir

Buell's Creek Reservoir is an anthropogenic reservoir north of Brockville, Ontario, in Mac Johnson Wildlife Area. It can be accessed from Debruge Road. There is a 2.7 kilometre walking trail around the lake that is accessible from Centennial Road.
