= Crna Bara =

Crna Bara (Serbian meaning "Black Pond") may refer to:

- Crna Bara (Čoka), a village in the municipality of Aleksinac, Serbia
- Crna Bara (Bogatić), a village in the municipality of Bogatić, Serbia
- Crna Bara (Aleksinac), a village in the municipality of Aleksinac, Serbia
- Crna Bara (Vlasotince), a village in the municipality of Vlasotince, Serbia
