= Big Yirkie Lake =

Lake in Ontario, Canada

- Location in eastern Ontario
- Coordinates: 45.15°N 77.33°W
- Basin countries: Canada
- Max. length: 1.04 km (0.65 mi)
- Max. width: 200 m (660 ft)
- Residence time: Several cottages are inhabited in Summer
- Surface elevation: 386 m (1,266 ft) above sea level
- Islands: Two unnamed islands
- Settlements: None

Big Yirkie Lake is a small lake in eastern Ontario, Canada. It can be found off of Highway 28, between Bancroft and Denbigh. The shape of the lake is triangular and long. Although it is a small lake, it has two islands, and it is bigger than its counterpart, Little Yirkie Lake. People fish in the lake for Pike, Bass, Pickerel and Perch.
