= Lai Blos =

Lake in Graubünden, Switzerland

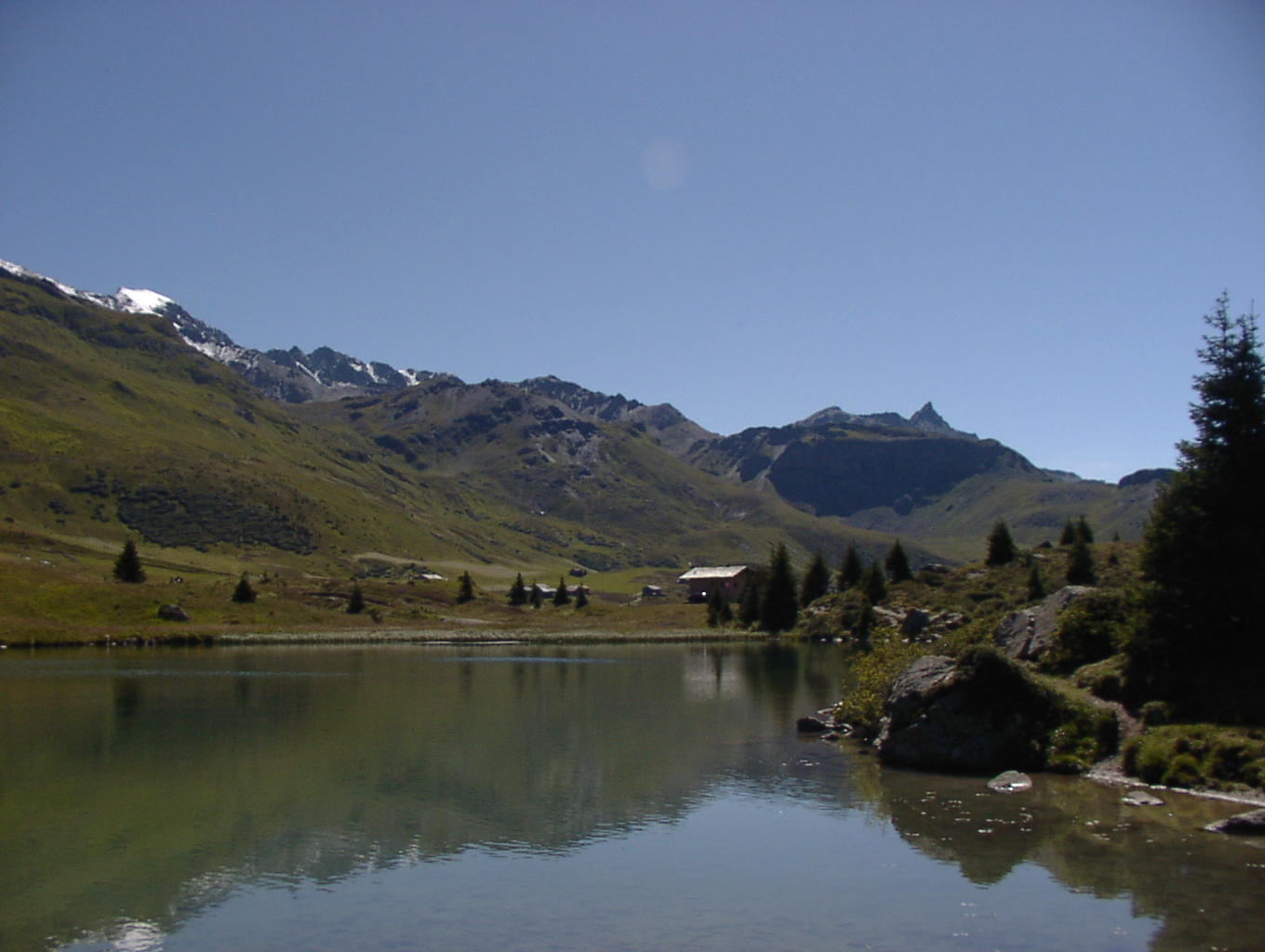

- Location within Canton of Graubünden Location within Switzerland Location within Italy Location within Alps
- Interactive map of Lai Blos
- Location: Alp Flix, Grisons
- Coordinates: 46°32′08″N 9°38′31″E
- Basin countries: Switzerland
- Surface elevation: 1,960 m (6,430 ft)

Lai Blos or Lais Blos are two small lakes on Alp Flix, at an elevation of 1960 m, in the Grisons, Switzerland. They are located near to Lai Neir.

The alp is listed in the Inventory of Mire Landscapes of Particular Beauty and National Importance.
