= Black Lake (Berrien County, Michigan) =

- Location within Michigan Location within the United States
- Location: Berrien County, Michigan
- Coordinates: 42°03′44″N 86°17′09″W
- Type: Lake
- Surface area: 25.103 acres (10.159 ha)
- Surface elevation: 696 feet (212 m)

Black Lake is a lake in Berrien County, in the U.S. state of Michigan. The lake has a surface area of 25.103 acres (10.159 ha).

Black Lake was so named on account of the dark character of its water.
