= Hahnensee =

Lake in the Grisons, Switzerland

- Location within Canton of Graubünden Location within Switzerland Location within Italy Location within Alps
- Interactive map of Hahnensee
- Location: St. Moritz, Grisons
- Coordinates: 46°28′03″N 9°49′43″E
- Basin countries: Switzerland
- Surface elevation: 2,153 m (7,064 ft)

Hahnensee (Romansh: Lej dals Chöds) is a lake above St. Moritz in the Grisons, Switzerland, at 2153 m above sealevel.

Next to the lake there is a restaurant of the same name. In the summer time, the area can be reached by several hiking trails. In the Winter skiers coming from the Piz Corvatsch can take the Giand'Alva skilift and ski down the almost 9 km long ski run, also called Hahnensee, into St. Mortitz-Bad. Though the run can only be opened after significant snowfall has accumulated.
