= Lej Nair (Silvaplana) =

Lake in the Grisons, Switzerland

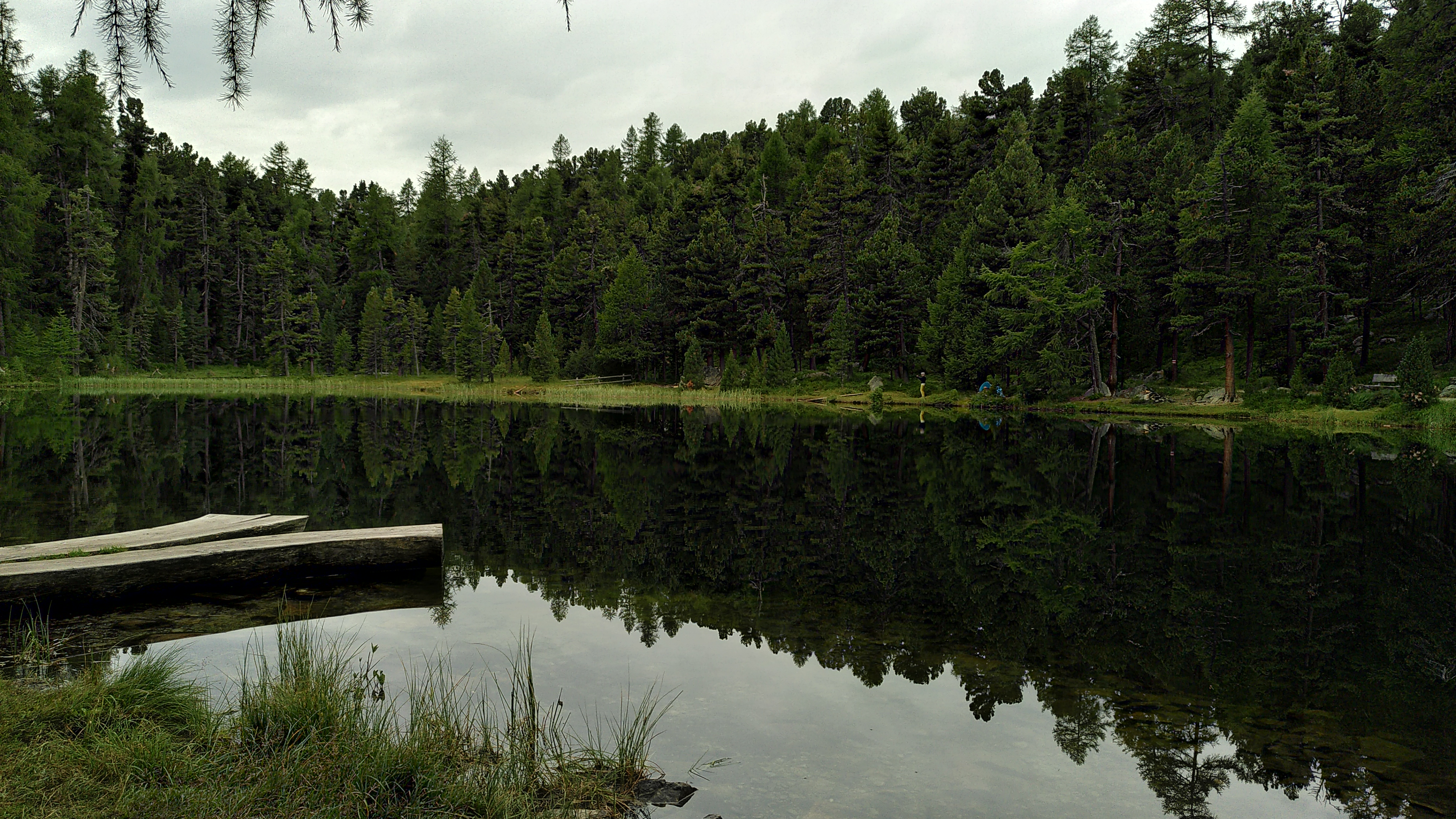

- Location within Canton of Graubünden Location within Switzerland Location within Italy Location within Alps
- Interactive map of Lej Nair
- Location: Silvaplana, Engadin, Grisons
- Coordinates: 46°28′15″N 9°49′7″E
- Basin countries: Switzerland
- Surface elevation: 1,864 m (6,115 ft)

Lej Nair (literally "Black Lake") is a lake above Silvaplana in the Engadin valley, Grisons, Switzerland.

A hiking trail leads from Lej Marsch to Lej Nair. Hahnensee (Lej dals Chöds) and Lej Zuppo are located close by.
