= Svartsjön, Hanveden =

Lake in Sweden

Svartsjön
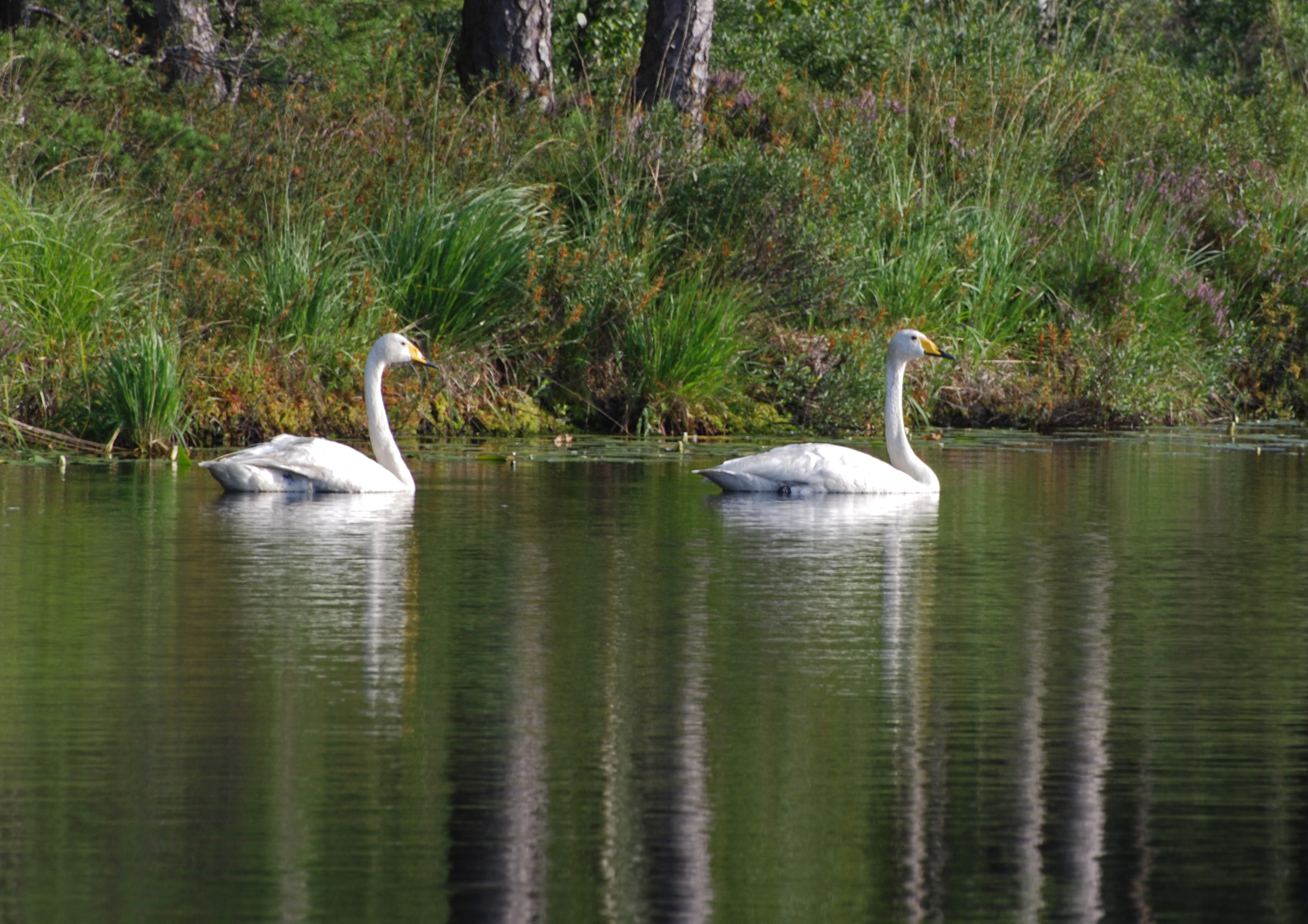

- Location within Stockholm
- Coordinates: 59°08′33″N 18°02′31″E
- Basin countries: Sweden

Svartsjön is a lake in Stockholm County, Södermanland, Sweden.
