= Buckley Lake (Ontario) =

Lake in Ontario, Canada

- Location: Peterborough County, Ontario
- Coordinates: 44°25′05″N 78°13′47″W

Buckley Lake, elevation 230 m (750 ft), is a small lake in Peterborough County of Southern Ontario, Canada. It is located just east of Lakefield in the Sawer Creek wetland.
