= Black Lake (Minden Hills) =

Lake in Haliburton County, Ontario, Canada

- Location in Southern Ontario
- Location: Haliburton County, Ontario
- Coordinates: 44°49′07″N 78°49′29″W
- Primary inflows: South Portage Creek
- Primary outflows: South Portage Creek
- Basin countries: Canada
- Max. length: 2.2 metres (7 ft 3 in)
- Max. width: 0.9 metres (2 ft 11 in)
- Surface elevation: 270 metres (890 ft)

Black Lake is a lake in the municipality of Minden Hills, Haliburton County in Central Ontario, Canada. It is part of the Great Lakes Basin and lies within geographic Lutterworth Township.

The lake is approximately 2 kilometres long and 1 kilometre at its widest point, and the primary inflow, at the north, and outflow, at the south, is Black Creek. Black Creek flows to Moore Lake, which drains via the Gull River, which in turn flows via the Kawartha Lakes, the Otonabee River and the Trent River to Lake Ontario. There is one named and privately owned island, Casimir Island.

Access to the lake is via two privately maintained roads leading east off of Ontario Highway 35, between the communities of Norland and Minden. There is a shared dock and approximately 100 cottages on the lake.

At the southern outflow, Black Creek offers marshy habitat to wildlife, such as loons, deer, beavers, and herons, as well as boating access to Moore Lake on the eastern side of Highway 35. At the south-eastern end, there are several cliffs.

== See also ==
- List of lakes in Ontario
