= Black Lake (Blind River) =

Lake in Ontario, Canada

- Location in Ontario
- Location: Algoma District, Ontario
- Coordinates: 46°16′40″N 82°52′38″W
- Part of: Great Lakes Basin
- Primary outflows: Black Creek
- Basin countries: Canada
- Max. length: 630 metres (2,070 ft)
- Max. width: 430 metres (1,410 ft)
- Surface elevation: 214 metres (702 ft)

Black Lake is a lake in the municipality of Blind River, Algoma District in Northeastern Ontario, Canada. It is part of the Great Lakes Basin.

The primary outflow, at the south, is Black Creek, which flows to Lake Duborne, which in turn flows via the Blind River to the North Channel on Lake Huron.

== See also ==
- List of lakes of Ontario
