= Bolton Lake (Timiskaming District) =

Lake in Timiskaming District, Ontario, Canada

- Location within Ontario
- Location: Timiskaming District, Ontario
- Coordinates: 47°51′09″N 81°01′43″W
- Primary inflows: Unnamed creek from Winding Lake
- Primary outflows: Unnamed creek to Lloyd Lake
- Basin countries: Canada
- Max. length: 0.64 km (0.40 mi)
- Max. width: 0.38 km (0.24 mi)
- Surface elevation: 357 m (1,171 ft)

Bolton Lake is a lake in the Moose River drainage basin in Timiskaming District, Ontario, Canada. It is about 640 metres (2,100 ft) long and 380 metres (1,247 ft) wide, and lies at an elevation of 357 metres (1,171 ft), 30 kilometres (19 mi) west southwest of the community of Matachewan. The primary inflow is an unnamed creek from Winding Lake, and the primary outflow is an unnamed creek to Lloyd Lake, which eventually flows into the Grassy River, and then the Mattagami River into the Moose River.
