= Black Lakes (Ontario) =

Pair of lakes in Ontario, Canada

- Location within Ontario
- Location: Kenora District, Ontario
- Coordinates: 49°45′44″N 93°31′05″W
- Primary outflows: Unnamed creek to Walleye Lake
- Basin countries: Canada

Black Lakes is a pair of lakes that are part of a small endorheic basin in Kenora District, Ontario, Canada, about 14 kilometres (9 mi) southwest of the community of Vermilion Bay. The western lake is larger, about 810 metres (2,657 ft) long and 480 metres (1,575 ft) wide and lies at an elevation of 374 metres (1,227 ft). It flows into the smaller eastern lake, which is about 560 metres (1,837 ft) long and 270 metres (886 ft) wide and lies at an elevation of 370 metres (1,214 ft). The eastern lake flows via an unnamed creek into Walleye Lake, which has no outlet.

== See also ==
- List of lakes in Ontario
