= Black Lake (Central Frontenac) =

Lake in Frontenac County, Ontario, Canada

- Location in Southern Ontario
- Location: Frontenac County, Ontario
- Coordinates: 44°46′35″N 76°43′14″W
- Part of: Saint Lawrence River drainage basin
- Primary outflows: Unnamed creek
- Basin countries: Canada
- Max. length: 1,160 metres (3,810 ft)
- Max. width: 600 metres (2,000 ft)
- Surface elevation: 205 metres (673 ft)

Black Lake is a lake in the municipality of Central Frontenac, Frontenac County in Eastern Ontario, Canada. It is part of the Saint Lawrence River drainage basin.

The primary outflow, at the west, is an unnamed creek that flows to Sharbot Lake, which in turn flows via the Fall River, the Mississippi River and the Ottawa River to the Saint Lawrence River.

Sharbot Lake Provincial Park envelops the northern, western and southern sides of the lake. Ontario Highway 7 runs along the north side of the lake.

== See also ==
- List of rivers of Ontario
