= Black Lake (Sioux Narrows-Nestor Falls) =

Lake in Kenora District, Ontario, Canada

- Location in Ontario
- Location: Kenora District, Ontario
- Coordinates: 49°32′28″N 94°04′47″W
- Primary inflows: Black River
- Primary outflows: Black River
- Basin countries: Canada
- Max. length: 5.4 kilometres (3.4 mi)
- Max. width: 1.9 kilometres (1.2 mi)
- Surface elevation: 348 metres (1,142 ft)

Black Lake is a lake in the municipality of Sioux Narrows-Nestor Falls, Kenora District in Northwestern Ontario, Canada. It is part of the Hudson Bay drainage basin, and is on the Black River, which is its primary inflow at the east and outflow at the southwest.

== Tributaries ==
- Black River
- Graphic Creek
- Johnny Creek

== See also ==
- List of lakes in Ontario
