= Black Lake (LeCaron Township) =

Lake in Ontario, Canada

- Location in Ontario
- Location: Algoma District, Ontario
- Coordinates: 46°38′13″N 83°01′51″W
- Part of: Great Lakes Basin
- Primary outflows: Black Creek
- Basin countries: Canada
- Max. length: 1,360 metres (4,460 ft)
- Max. width: 990 metres (3,250 ft)
- Surface elevation: 377 metres (1,237 ft)

Black Lake is a lake in geographic LeCaron Township in the Unorganized North Part of Algoma District in Northeastern Ontario, Canada. It is part of the Great Lakes Basin.

There are four unnamed inflows: two at the west, including one that arrives from Portage Lake; and two at the northeast. The primary outflow, at the southeast, is an unnamed creek that flows to Endikai Lake, which in turn flows via the West Little White River, the Little White River and the Mississagi River to the North Channel on Lake Huron.

== See also ==
- List of lakes of Ontario
