= Bolton Lake (Kenora District) =

Lake in Kenora District, Ontario, Canada

- Location within Ontario
- Location: Kenora District, Ontario
- Coordinates: 49°20′48″N 92°49′38″W
- Primary outflows: Unnamed creek to Lower Manitou Lake
- Basin countries: Canada
- Max. length: .73 km (0.45 mi)
- Max. width: .32 km (0.20 mi)
- Surface elevation: 382 m (1,253 ft)

Bolton Lake is a lake in Kenora District, Ontario, Canada. It is about 730 metres (2,395 ft) long and 320 metres (1,050 ft) wide, and lies at an elevation of 382 metres (1,253 ft) about 48 kilometres (30 mi) south of the community of Dryden. The primary outflow is an unnamed creek, which flows into Lower Manitou Lake just south of Watson's Narrows. Bolton Lake lies just west over a small ridge of Bolton Bay on Lower Manitou Lake.

== See also ==
- List of lakes in Ontario
