= Bolton Lakes (Ontario) =

Group of lakes in Ontario, Canada

- Location within Ontario
- Location: Central Frontenac, Frontenac County, Ontario
- Coordinates: 44°48′26″N 76°46′03″W
- Primary outflows: Bolton Creek
- Basin countries: Canada
- Max. length: 5.2 km (3.2 mi)
- Max. width: 0.5 km (0.31 mi)
- Surface elevation: 214 m (702 ft)

Bolton Lakes is a lake in the Ottawa River drainage basin in Central Frontenac, Frontenac County, Ontario, Canada. It is about 5.2 kilometres (3.2 mi) long and 0.5 kilometres (0.3 mi) wide, and lies at an elevation of 214 metres (702 ft), 7.5 kilometres (4.7 mi) northwest of the community of Sharbot Lake and 3.5 kilometres (2.2 mi) north of Highway 7. The primary outflow is Bolton Creek, which flows via the Fall River, and then the Mississippi River into the Ottawa River.

== See also ==
- List of lakes in Ontario
