= Black Lake (Barager Township) =

- Location in Ontario
- Location: Algoma District, Ontario
- Coordinates: 47°36′02″N 84°42′44″W
- Type: natural freshwater lake
- Part of: Great Lakes Basin
- Primary outflows: Coldwater River
- Basin countries: Canada
- Max. length: 1.2 kilometres (0.7 mi)
- Max. width: 1.0 kilometre (0.6 mi)
- Surface elevation: 370 metres (1,210 ft)
- Islands: 2

Black Lake is a lake in geographic Barager Township in the Unorganized North Part of Algoma District in Northeastern Ontario, Canada. It is part of the Great Lakes Basin, lies entirely within Lake Superior Provincial Park, and is the source of the Coldwater River, which is its primary outflow at the east. The Coldwater River flows to Lake Superior.

== See also ==
- List of lakes in Ontario
