= Black Lake (Dysart et al) =

Lake in Haliburton County, Ontario, Canada

- Location in Southern Ontario
- Location: Haliburton County, Ontario
- Coordinates: 45°01′55″N 78°25′00″W
- Primary inflows: South Portage Creek
- Primary outflows: South Portage Creek
- Basin countries: Canada
- Max. length: 870 metres (2,850 ft)
- Max. width: 450 metres (1,480 ft)
- Surface elevation: 361 metres (1,184 ft)

Black Lake is a lake in the municipality of Dysart et al, Haliburton County in Central Ontario, Canada. It is part of the Great Lakes Basin and lies within geographic Dysart Township.

The primary inflow, at the north, and outflow, at the southwest, is South Portage Creek, which flows via Haas Creek to the Burnt River, which in turn flows via the Kawartha Lakes, the Otonabee River and the Trent River to Lake Ontario. Ontario Highway 118 passes the east side of the lake.

== See also ==
- List of rivers of Ontario
