= Lai Nair =

Lake in the Grisons, Switzerland

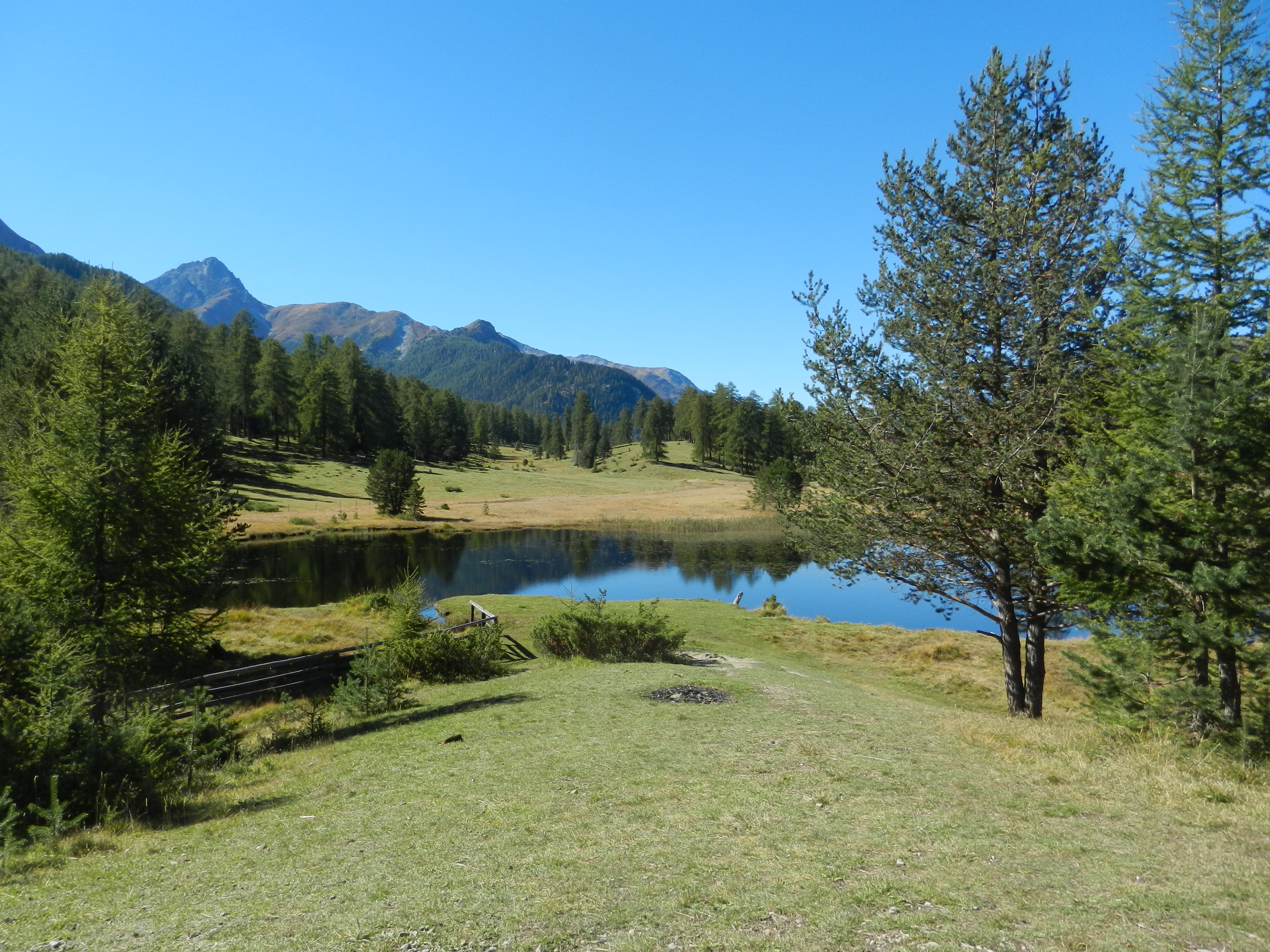

- Location within Canton of Graubünden Location within Switzerland Location within Italy Location within Alps
- Interactive map of Lai Nair
- Location: Tarasp, Lower Engadine, Grisons
- Coordinates: 46°46′34″N 10°16′41″E
- Basin countries: Switzerland
- Surface elevation: 1,544 m (5,066 ft)

Lai Nair (literally "Black Lake") is a small lake above Tarasp in the Lower Engadine, Graubünden, Switzerland.

The site is listed in the Inventory of Raised and Transitional Bogs of National Importance.
