= Lai Neir (Alp Flix) =

Lake in the Grisons, Switzerland

- Location within Canton of Graubünden Location within Switzerland Location within Italy Location within Alps
- Interactive map of Lai Neir
- Location: Alp Flix, Sur, Grisons
- Coordinates: 46.535°N 9.638°E
- Basin countries: Switzerland

Lai Neir is a small lake on Alp Flix, in the Grisons, Switzerland. It is listed in the Inventory of Raised and Transitional Bogs of National Importance.

Lai Neir and Lai Blos are part of Alp Flix, a site listed in the Inventory of Mire Landscapes of Particular Beauty and National Importance.
