= Lej Nair (Bernina) =

Lake in the Grisons, Switzerland

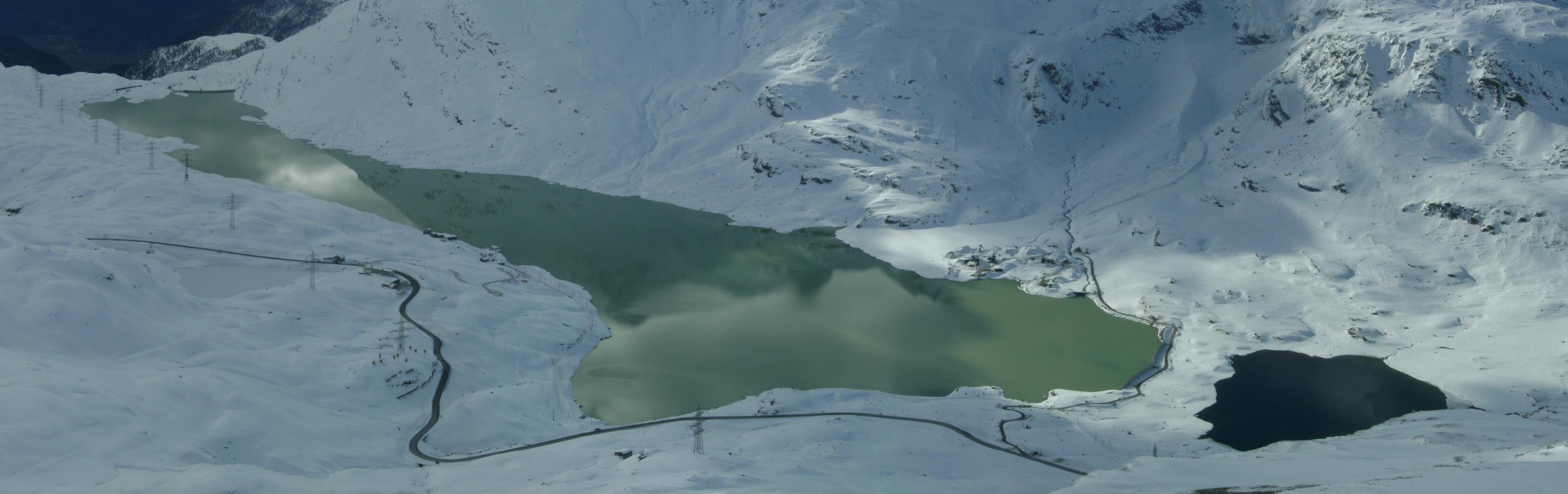
- Lago Bianco (left) and Lej Nair (right)

- Location within Canton of Graubünden Location within Switzerland Location within Italy Location within Alps
- Interactive map of Lej Nair
- Location: Bernina Pass, Pontresina, Grisons
- Coordinates: 46°24′58″N 10°00′26″E
- Basin countries: Switzerland
- Surface elevation: 2,223 m (7,293 ft)

Lej Nair (literally "black lake" in Romansh) is a small lake on Bernina Pass in the canton of Grisons, Switzerland. It is located near the summit of the pass, between Lago Bianco ("white lake") and Lej Pitschen ("small lake"). While Lago Bianco drains to the Adriatic Sea, Lej Nair and Lej Pitschen are part of the basin of the Inn River draining into the Black Sea.

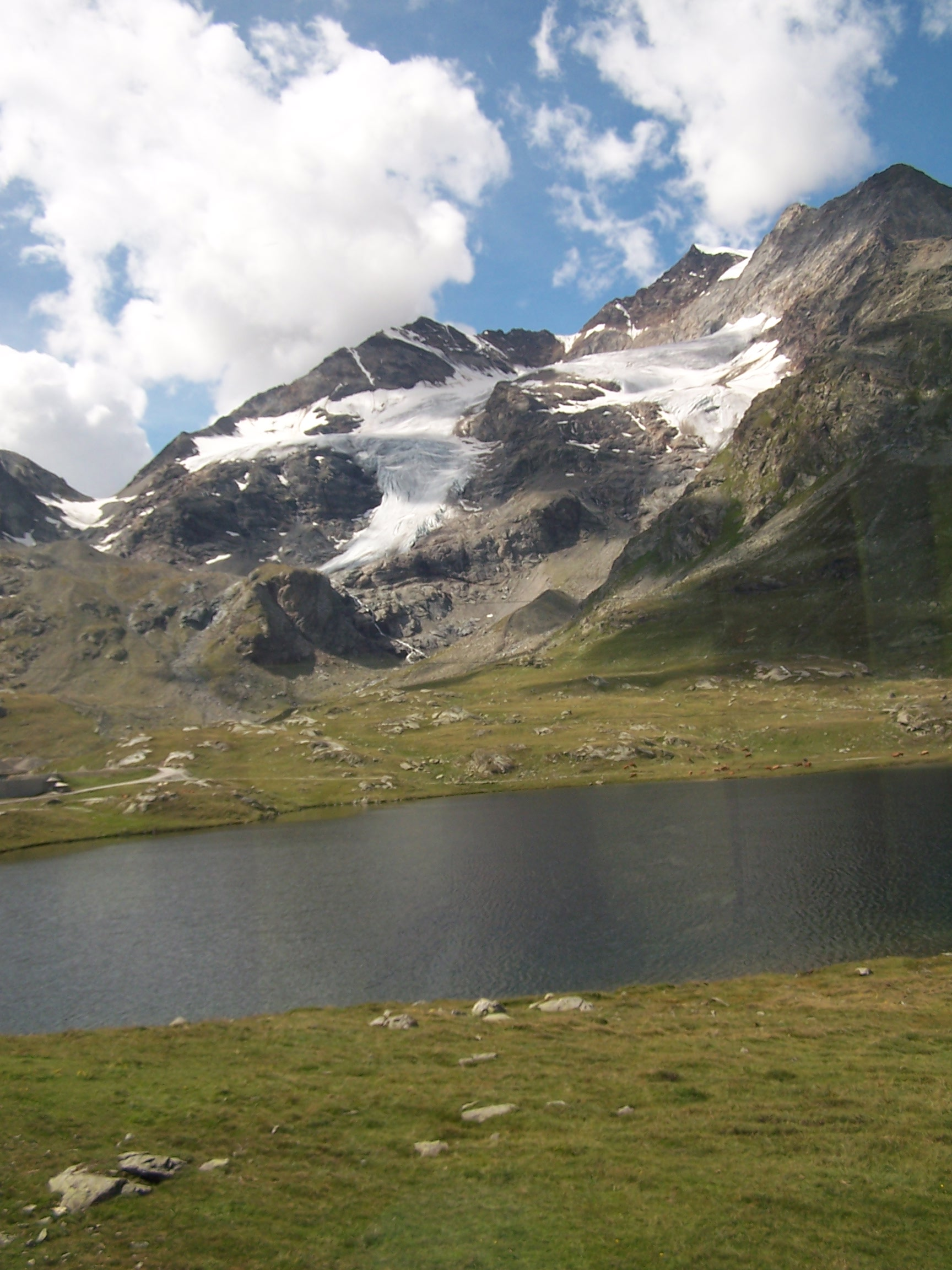
Lej Nair, Switzerland

== See also ==
- List of mountain lakes of Switzerland
