= Jocko (disambiguation) =

Jocko is a masculine nickname. It may also refer to:

== Places ==
- Jocko, Ontario, a dispersed rural community in Ontario, Canada
- Jocko River (Ontario)
- Jocko River (Montana), United States
- Jocko Valley, Montana, United States

== Other uses ==
- Jocko ou le Singe du Brésil (Jocko or the Monkey of Brazil), a 19th-century play by Edmond Rochefort
- a monkey in Jo, Zette and Jocko, a Franco-Belgian comic book series
- Jocko (walrus), a character in the movie 50 First Dates and the walrus who played him
- jocko, a short version of a lawn jockey
- Jocko (TV series), a 1981 New Zealand TV series

== See also ==
- Little Jocko River, Ontario, Canada
