= Sucker Lake (Nipissing District) =

- Location in Ontario
- Location: Nipissing District, Ontario
- Coordinates: 46°43′06″N 79°25′05″W
- Type: Lake
- Part of: Saint Lawrence River drainage basin
- Primary outflows: Sucker Creek
- Basin countries: Canada
- Max. length: 2.8 km (1.7 mi)
- Max. width: 1.4 km (0.9 mi)
- Surface elevation: 306 m (1,004 ft)
- Islands: 1

Sucker Lake is a lake in geographic La Salle Township and geographic Osborne Township in the Unorganized North Part of Nipissing District in Northeastern Ontario, Canada, about 5.5 kilometres (3.4 mi) east of the railway point of Diver on the Ontario Northland Railway. It is in the Saint Lawrence River drainage basin and is the source of Sucker Creek.

The lake has three unnamed inflows: at the west, arriving from the direction of La Salle Lakes; at the north, arriving from the direction of Serene Lake; at the east, arriving from an unnamed lake. The primary outflow, at the south, is Sucker Creek, which flows via Little Sucker Lake, the Jocko River, and the Ottawa River to the Saint Lawrence River. The lake has one island, at the west.

The southwest shore of the lake, from the unnamed inflow arriving at the west from La Salle Lakes to the Succker Creek outflow at the south, is along the border with Jocko Rivers Provincial Park.

The lake can be accessed from a tertiary road that leads: from Diver northeast to the community of McLaren's Bay on Lake Timiskaming; or, via a subsequent branching tertiary road, southeast to Ontario Highway 63, at a point about halfway between that highway's crossing over the Jocko River and Lake Timiskaming.

== See also ==
- List of lakes in Ontario
