= Boland Lake =

- Location in Ontario
- Location: Nipissing District, Ontario
- Coordinates: 46°44′38″N 79°25′53″W
- Type: Endorheic lake
- Basin countries: Canada
- Max. length: 1.6 km (1.0 mi)
- Max. width: .9 km (0.6 mi)
- Surface elevation: 311 m (1,020 ft)
- Islands: 1

Boland Lake is an endorheic lake in geographic La Salle Township in the Unorganized North Part of Nipissing District in Northeastern Ontario, Canada. It is adjacent to (just east of) the La Salle Lakes and is about 5.5 kilometres (3.4 mi) northeast of the railway point of Diver, on the Ontario Northland Railway. The lake has one, unnamed island.

== Access ==
Boland Lake lies on the north side of a tertiary road that leads: from Diver northeast to the community of McLaren's Bay on Lake Timiskaming; or, via a subsequent branching tertiary road, southeast to Ontario Highway 63, at a point about halfway between that highway's crossing over the Jocko River and Lake Timiskaming.

== Recreation ==
The Boland Lake campsite of the McConnell Lake Campgrounds is on the southern shore of the lake with road access.

== See also ==
- List of lakes in Ontario
