= List of lakes of Ontario: F =

This is a list of lakes of Ontario beginning with the letter F.

== Fab–Fal ==
- Faber Lake
- Factor Lake (Rainy River District)
- Factor Lake (Algoma District)
- Fade Lake
- Fagan Lake
- Fagan Ponds
- Fahey Lake
- Fair Lake (Parry Sound District)
- Fair Lake (Peterborough County)
- Fair Lake (Rainy River District)
- Fairbairn Lake (Thunder Bay District)
- Fairbairn Lake (Sudbury District)
- Fairbank Lake
- Fairchild Lake
- Faircloth Lake
- Fairholme Lake
- Fairloch Lake
- Fairplay Lake
- Fairview Lake
- Fairy Lake (Georgian Bay)
- Fairy Lake (Nipissing District)
- Fairy Lake (Algoma District)
- Fairy Lake (Huntsville)
- Fairy Lake (Peterborough County)
- Fairy Lake (Halton Region)
- Faith Lake
- Fakeloo Lake
- Falan Lake
- Falby Lake
- Falcon Gold Lake
- Falcon Lake (Nipissing District)
- Falcon Lake (Thunder Bay District)
- Fall Lake (Nipissing District)
- Fall Lake (GTP Block 4 Township, Thunder Bay District)
- Fall Lake (Dorion)
- Fall Lake (Kenora District)
- Fall-In Lake
- Fallduck Lakes
- Fallen Lake
- Fallingsnow Lake
- Fallis Pond
- Falloon Lake
- Falls Lake (Algoma District)
- Falls Lake (Manitoulin District)
- Fallscamp Lake
- False Lake
- Falsetto Lake

== Fan–Fay ==
- Fan Lake (Thunder Bay District)
- Fan Lake (Timiskaming District)
- Fanny Lake
- Fanshawe Lake
- Far Lake (Sudbury District)
- Far Lake (Thunder Bay District)
- Faraday Lake
- Farah Lake
- Farden Lake
- Farewell Lake
- Fargo Lake
- Faries Lake
- Faris Lake
- Farlain Lake
- Farlane Lake
- Farlette Lake
- Farley Lake
- Farlinger Lake
- Farm Bay Lake
- Farm Lake (Sudbury District)
- Farm Lake (Farm Creek, Kenora District)
- Farm Lake (Greater Sudbury)
- Farm Lake (Nipissing District)
- Farm Lake (Lac Seul, Kenora District)
- Farmer Lake (Sudbury District)
- Farmer Lake (Kenora District)
- Farmer Lake (Thunder Bay District)
- Farncomb Lake
- Farner Lake
- Farnes Lake
- Farquhar Lake (Haliburton County)
- Farquhar Lake (Algoma District)
- Farrel Lake (Haliburton County)
- Farrel Lake (Algoma District)
- Farrell Lake
- Farren Lake
- Farrer Lake (Thunder Bay District)
- Farrer Lake (Kenora District)
- Farrington Lake
- Farrow Lake
- Fassett Lake
- Fat Lake (Kenora District)
- Fat Lake (Nipissing District)
- Fatima Lake
- Fatty Lake
- Faubert Lake
- Faulk Lake
- Faulkenham Lake
- Faulkner Lake
- Fault Lake (Timiskaming District)
- Fault Lake (Sudbury District)
- Fault Lake (Kenora District)
- Faultside Lake
- Fauquier Lake (Nipissing District)
- Fauquier Lake (Rainy River District)
- Lac Faux-Pas
- Favel Lake
- Favell Lake (Cochrane District)
- Favell Lake (Kenora District)
- Favot Lake
- Favourable Lake
- Fawcett Lake (Sudbury District)
- Fawcett Lake (Pelican Creek, Kenora District)
- Fawcett Lake (Cat River, Kenora District)
- Fawcett Lake Chain
- Fawn Lake (Thunder Bay District)
- Fawn Lake (Sioux Narrows-Nestor Falls)
- Fawn Lake (Macaulay Township, Bracebridge)
- Fawn Lake (Fawn River, Kenora District)
- Fawn Lake (Nipissing District)
- Fawn Lake (Draper Township, Bracebridge)
- Fawn Lake (Parry Sound District)
- Fawn Lake (Miller Township, North Frontenac)
- Fawn Lake (Clarendon Township, North Frontenac)
- Fawthrop Lake
- Faya Lake

== Fe ==
- Feagan Lake
- Fear Lake
- Fearless Lake
- Feather Lake
- Feaver Lake
- Fecteau Lake
- Fee Lake
- Feely Lake
- Feeny Lake
- Feist Lake
- Felcite Lake
- Feldman Lake (Kenora District)
- Feldman Lake (Cochrane District)
- Feldman Lake (Timiskaming District)
- Feline Lake
- Felix Lake (Thunder Bay District)
- Felix Lake (Kenora District)
- Felix Lake (Potier Township, Sudbury District)
- Felix Lake (Marshay Township, Sudbury District)
- Felsen Lake
- Felsia Lake
- Felst Lake
- Felt Lake
- Felto Lake
- Fen Lake (Nipissing District)
- Fen Lake (Sudbury District)
- Fen Lake (Kenora District)
- Fen Lake (Thunder Bay District)
- Fenn Lake
- Fennah Lake
- Fennell Lake
- Fenson Lake
- Fenton Lake (Algoma District)
- Fenton Lake (Muskoka District)
- Ferdinand Lake
- Fergus Lake (Sudbury District)
- Fergus Lake (Cochrane District)
- Ferguson Lake (Thunder Bay District)
- Ferguson Lake (Stewart Township, Nipissing District)
- Ferguson Lake (Timiskaming District)
- Ferguson Lake (Kenora District)
- Ferguson Lake (Rainy River District)
- Ferguson Lake (Sudbury District)
- Ferguson Lake (Lanark County)
- Ferguson Lake (Temagami)
- Fergusons Lake
- Fergusons Mud Lake
- Ferland's Lake
- Fermoy Lake
- Fern Lake (Whitman Township, Algoma District)
- Fern Lake (Quill Township, Algoma District)
- Fern Lake (Nipissing District)
- Fern Lake (Rainy River District)
- Fernlund Lake
- Fernow Lake
- Ferns Lake
- Ferrier Lake
- Ferrim Lake
- Ferris Lake
- Festuca Lake
- Fetter Lake

== Fi ==
- Fib Lake
- Ficht Lake
- Fiddler Lake
- Fidler Lake
- Fido Lake
- Fields Lake
- Fife Lake (Thunder Bay District)
- Fife Lake (Sudbury District)
- Fife Lake (Algoma District)
- Fifteen Lake
- Fifteen Mile Lake (Parry Sound District)
- Fifteen Mile Lake (Muskoka District)
- Fifteen Mile Pond
- Fifth Depot Lake
- Fifth Lake
- Fifty Dollar Lake
- Fifty Nine Lake
- Fifty Two Lake
- Fifty-five Mile Lake
- Fillet Lake
- Fillion Lake
- Fills Lake
- Film Lake
- Filter Lake
- Fin Lake (White Township, Nipissing District)
- Fin Lake (Thunder Bay District)
- Fin Lake (Canisbay Township, Nipissing District)
- Final Lake (Kenora District)
- Final Lake (Thunder Bay District)
- Finch Lake (Nipissing District)
- Finch Lake (Lennox and Addington County)
- Findlay Lake (Cochrane District)
- Findlay Lake (Kenora District)
- Findlay Lake (Renfrew County)
- Fine Lake
- Finger Lake (Cochrane District)
- Finger Lake (Severn River, Kenora District)
- Finger Lake (Corbriere Township, Algoma District)
- Finger Lake (Ferdinand Lake, Kenora District)
- Finger Lake (Parry Sound District)
- Finger Lake (Nipissing District)
- Finger Lake (Tweedle Township, Algoma District)
- Finger Lake (Rainy River District)
- Finger Lake (Thunder Bay District)
- Finish Lake
- Fink Lake
- Finlay Lake
- Finlayson Lake (Nipissing District)
- Finlayson Lake (Kenora District)
- Finlayson Lake (Rainy River District)
- Finlayson Lake (Thunder Bay District)
- Finn Lake (Simons Township, Algoma District)
- Finn Lake (Aweres Township, Algoma District)
- Finn Lake (McMeekin Township, Kenora District)
- Finn Lake (McCauley River, Kenora District)
- Finn Lake (Nadjiwon Township, Algoma District)
- Finnegan Lake
- Finney Lake
- Finton Lake
- Fir Lake (Kenora District)
- Fir Lake (Algoma District)
- Fire Hill Lake
- Fire Island Lake
- Fire Lake (Aberdeen Creek, Thunder Bay District)
- Fire Lake (Rainy River District)
- Fire Lake (Kenora District)
- Fire Lake (Sudbury District)
- Fire Lake (Algoma District)
- Fire Lake (Weikwabinonaw River, Thunder Bay District)
- Firefly Lake
- Fireline Lake
- Firetrail Lake
- First Depot Lake
- First Egan Lake
- First Government Lake
- First James Lake
- First Justin Lake
- First Kargus Lake
- First Lake (Gravel River, Thunder Bay District)
- First Lake (Hall Township, Sudbury District)
- First Lake (Western Peninsula, Kenora District)
- First Lake (Lone Isle Creek, Thunder Bay District)
- First Lake (Cavana Township, Sudbury District)
- First Lake (Elliot Lake)
- First Lake (Seguin)
- First Lake (Labelle Township, Algoma District)
- First Lake (Selkirk Township, Sudbury District)
- First Lake (Cromlech Township, Algoma District)
- First Lake (Big Sand Lake, Kenora District)
- First Lake (Nipissing)
- First Loon Lake
- First Twin Pond
- Firth Lake
- Fischer Lake
- Fish Hawk Lake (Sudbury District)
- Fish Hawk Lake (Kenora District)
- Fish Hook Lake
- Fish Lake (Parry Sound District)
- Fish Lake (Kenora District)
- Fish Lake (Prince Edward County)
- Fish Lake (Algoma District)
- Fish Lake (Nairn and Hyman)
- Fish Lake (Frontenac County)
- Fish Lake (Lyell Township, South Algonquin)
- Fish Lake (Killarney)
- Fish Lake (Dickens Township, South Algonquin)
- Fishbasket Lake
- Fishbox Lake
- Fisher Lake (Kashaweogama Lake, Thunder Bay District)
- Fisher Lake (Populus Lake, Kenora District)
- Fisher Lake (Wilkie Lake, Kenora District)
- Fisher Lake (Haliburton County)
- Fisher Lake (McNamara Township, Sudbury District)
- Fisher Lake (Golden Gate Lake, Thunder Bay District)
- Fisher Lake (Redsky Township, Algoma District)
- Fisher Lake (Sweeny Township, Sudbury District)
- Fisher Lake (Timiskaming District)
- Fisher Lake (McConnell Township, Sudbury District)
- Fisher Lake (Cochrane District)
- Fisher Lake (Kawartha Lakes)
- Fisher Lake (Rainy River District)
- Fisher Lake (Arnott Township, Algoma District)
- Fisher Lake (Nipissing District)
- Fisher's Pond
- Fishery Lake
- Fishing Lake
- Fishnet Lake
- Fishog Lake
- Fishtail Lake
- Fishtrap Lake (Attawapiskat River, Kenora District)
- Fishtrap Lake (Fishtrap Creek, Kenora District)
- Fission Lake
- Fitchie Lake
- Fitter Lake
- Fitz Lake
- Fitzell Lake
- Fitzgerald Lake
- Fitzgibbon Lake
- Fitzpatrick Lake (Escape Lake, Thunder Bay District)
- Fitzpatrick Lake (Kenogamisis River, Thunder Bay District)
- Fitzpatrick Lake (Algoma District)
- Five Cross Lake
- Five Mile Lake (Sudbury District)
- Five Mile Lake (Rainy River District)
- Five Minute Lake
- Five Pines Lake
- Five Star Lake
- Fiveash Lake
- Fizell Lake

== Fl ==
- Flack Lake
- Flag Lake (Timiskaming District)
- Flag Lake (Elliot Lake)
- Flag Lake (Worton Township, Algoma District)
- Flag Lake (Thunder Bay District)
- Flagg Lake
- Flail Lake
- Flake Lake
- Flambeau Lake
- Flame Lake (Sudbury District)
- Flame Lake (Kenora District)
- Flamingo Lake (Algoma District)
- Flamingo Lake (Cochrane District)
- Flanagan Lake
- Flanders Lake
- Flange Lake
- Flannery Lake
- Flapjack Lake (Kenora District)
- Flapjack Lake (Nipissing District)
- Flash Lake
- Flat Iron Lake
- Flat Lake (Timiskaming District)
- Flat Lake (Kenora District)
- Flat Lake (Thunder Bay District)
- Flat Lake (Algoma District)
- Flatrock Lake (Thunder Bay District)
- Flatrock Lake (Muskoka District)
- Flats Lake
- Flatstone Lake
- Flatt Lake
- Flavelle Lake
- Flavour Lake
- Flaxman Lake
- Fleck Lake
- Fleet Lake
- Flegg Lake
- Fleming Lake (Thunder Bay District)
- Fleming Lake (Cochrane District)
- Fleming Lake (Lake of Bays)
- Fleming Lake (Huntsville)
- Flemings Lake
- Flesch Lake
- Flesher Lake
- Flesherton Community Pond
- Flet Lake
- Fletcher Lake (Haliburton County)
- Fletcher Lake (Thunder Bay District)
- Fletcher Lake (Kenora District)
- Fletcher Lake (Algoma District)
- Fletchers Lake
- Flett Lake
- Flew Lake
- Flex Lake
- Flicker Lake (Sudbury District)
- Flicker Lake (Thunder Bay District)
- Flindt Lake
- Flint Lake (Kenora District)
- Flint Lake (Thunder Bay District)
- Flint Lake (Algoma District)
- Float Lake
- Floating Heart Lake (Nipissing District)
- Floating Heart Lake (Thunder Bay District)
- Floating Island Lake
- Floating Rock Lake
- Flood Lake (Cochrane District)
- Flood Lake (Terrace Bay)
- Flood Lake (Flood Township, Thunder Bay District)
- Flood Lake (Rainy River District)
- Floodwood Lake
- Flora Lake (Rainy River District)
- Flora Lake (Kenora District)
- Floranna Lake
- Florence Lake (Haliburton County)
- Florence Lake (Kenora District)
- Florence Lake (Thunder Bay District)
- Florence Lake (Nipissing District)
- Florence Lake (Parker Township, Sudbury District)
- Florence Lake (Cochrane District)
- Florence Lake (Mongowin Township, Sudbury District)
- Florence Lake (De Gaulle Township, Sudbury District)
- Florence Lake (Huotari Township, Algoma District)
- Florence Lake (Grossman Township, Algoma District)
- Florin Lake (Cochrane District)
- Florin Lake (Kenora District)
- Flory Lake
- Floss Lake
- Flossie Lake (Kenora District)
- Flossie Lake (Muskoka District)
- Flossie Lake (Thunder Bay District)
- Flounder Lake
- Flower Lake (Thunder Bay District)
- Flower Lake (Kenora District)
- Flower Round Lake
- Floyd Lake
- Fluke Lake
- Fluker Lake
- Flundra Lake
- Flute Lake
- Fly Lake (Muskoka District)
- Fly Lake (Kenora District)
- Fly Lake (Cochrane District)
- Fly Lake (Nipissing District)
- Fly Lake (McLeod Township, Sudbury District)
- Fly Lake (Thunder Bay District)
- Fly Lake (Whitefish Lake 6)
- Fly Lake (Algoma District)
- Flying Fisher Lake
- Flying Goose Lake
- Flying Loon Lake
- Flyline Lake
- Flynn Lake
- Flynne Lake

== Foa–Fol ==
- Foam Lake (East Jackpine River, Thunder Bay District)
- Foam Lake (Algoma District)
- Foam Lake (Furlonge Township, Thunder Bay District)
- Foch Lake
- Fodder Lake
- Fog Lake (Rainy River District)
- Fog Lake (Fog Creek, Thunder Bay District)
- Fog Lake (Kenora District)
- Fog Lake (Cockeram Township, Thunder Bay District)
- Fog Lake (Manion Township, Thunder Bay District)
- Fog Lake (Nipissing District)
- Fogal Lake
- Fogerty Lake
- Fogg Lake
- Foisey Lake
- Fold Lake
- Foley Lake (Ball Township, Kenora District)
- Foley Lake (Yet Creek, Kenora District)
- Foley Lake (Renfrew County)
- Foley Lake (Nipissing District)
- Foley Lake (Sudbury District)
- Folkard Lake
- Folly Lake
- Folsom Lake
- Folson Lake

== Foo–Foy ==
- Fool Lake
- Foolem Lake
- Fools Lake
- Foot Lake (Behmann Township, Algoma District)
- Foot Lake (Sudbury District)
- Foot Lake (Thunder Bay District)
- Foot Lake (Timiskaming District)
- Foot Lake (Huron Shores)
- Foot Lake (Kenora District)
- Foot Lake (Cochrane District)
- Foote Lake (Nipissing District)
- Foote Lake (Parry Sound District)
- Foote Lake (Thunder Bay District)
- Footprint Lake (Rainy River District)
- Footprint Lake (Algoma District)
- Footprint Lake (Cochrane District)
- Footprint Lakes
- Forbes Lake (Nipissing District)
- Forbes Lake (Cochrane District)
- Forbes Lake (Parry Sound District)
- Forbes Lake (Thunder Bay District)
- Forbes Lake (Kenora District)
- Ford Lake (Ontario–Manitoba)
- Ford Lake (Parry Sound District)
- Ford Lake (Cochrane District)
- Ford Lake (Sudbury District)
- Ford Lake (Algoma District)
- Ford Lake (Osaquan Township, Kenora District)
- Forde Lake
- Fore Lake
- Forearm Lake
- Foref Lake
- Foreman Lake (Kenora District)
- Foreman Lake (Muskoka District)
- Foreshew Lake
- Forest Lake (Smellie Township, Kenora District)
- Forest Lake (Wind Creek, Kenora District)
- Forest Lake (Sudbury District)
- Forest Lake (Parry Sound District)
- Forestell Lake
- Forester Lake (Kenora District)
- Forester Lake (Algoma District)
- Forgan Lake
- Forge Lake (Thunder Bay District)
- Forge Lake (Algoma District)
- Forget Lake (Thunder Bay District)
- Forget Lake (Parry Sound District)
- Forgotten Lake
- Foris Lake
- Fork Lake (Timiskaming District)
- Fork Lake (Kenora District)
- Fork Lake (Hastings County)
- Fork Lake (Sudbury District)
- Fork Lake (Sproule Township, Nipissing District)
- Fork Lake (Boyd Township, Nipissing District)
- Fork Lake (Algoma District)
- Fork Lake (Thunder Bay District)
- Forks Lake
- Forlise Lake
- Forlorn Lake
- Forrest Lake
- Forrester Lake
- Forron Lake
- Forsberg Lake
- Forsyth Lake (Timiskaming District)
- Forsyth Lake (Thunder Bay District)
- Forsythe Lake
- Fortes Lake
- Fortescue Lake
- Forth Lake
- Fortune Lake (Frontenac County)
- Fortune Lake (Timiskaming District)
- Fortune Lake (Thunder Bay District)
- Fortune Lake (Kenora District)
- Fortune Lake (Sudbury District)
- Fortune Lake (Cochrane District)
- Lake Forty-four
- Forty Four Lake
- Forty Mile Lake
- Foss Lake
- Foster Lake (Sudbury District)
- Foster Lake (Greater Sudbury)
- Foster Lake (Thunder Bay District)
- Foster Lake (Hastings County)
- Foster Lake (Kenora District)
- Foster Lake (Algoma District)
- Foster Ponds
- Fosters Lake
- Fotheringham Lake
- Found Lake (Thunder Bay District)
- Found Lake (Kenora District)
- Found Lake (Nipissing District)
- Found Lake (Algoma District)
- Founders Lake
- Fountain Lake
- Four Corner Lake
- Four Island Lake
- Four Line Lake
- Four Mile Lake (Kawartha Lakes)
- Four Mile Lake (Kenora District)
- Four Mile Lake (Sudbury District)
- Four Mile Lake (Nipissing District)
- Four Mile Pond
- Four Wells Lake
- Fourbass Lake
- Fourbay Lake (Fourbay Creek, Thunder Bay District)
- Fourbay Lake (Sturgeon River, Thunder Bay District)
- Fourclaim Lake
- Fourcorner Lake
- Fournier Lake (Rainy River District)
- Fournier Lake (Cochrane District)
- Fournier Lake (Algoma District)
- Fournier Lake (Thunder Bay District)
- Fournier Lake (Nipissing District)
- Fournier Lake (Timiskaming District)
- Fourstar Lake
- Fourteen Island Lake
- Fourteen Lake
- Fourth Depot Lake
- Fourth Lake (Thunder Bay District)
- Fourth Lake (Kenora District)
- Fourth Lake (Sudbury District)
- Fowler Lake (Thunder Bay District)
- Fowler Lake (Cochrane District)
- Fowler Lake (Muskoka District)
- Fowlers Pond
- Fowlkes Lakes
- Fox Lagoon
- Fox Lake (Sword Creek, Kenora District)
- Fox Lake (Little Jet Lake, Kenora District)
- Fox Lake (Frontenac County)
- Fox Lake (Venturi Township, Sudbury District)
- Fox Lake (Lennox and Addington County)
- Fox Lake (Matachewan)
- Fox Lake (Wilson Township, Parry Sound District)
- Fox Lake (Fox River, Thunder Bay District)
- Fox Lake (Kearney)
- Fox Lake (Press Lake, Kenora District)
- Fox Lake (Fox Creek, Thunder Bay District)
- Fox Lake (Margaret Township, Sudbury District)
- Fox Lake (Renfrew County)
- Fox Lake (Boston Township, Timiskaming District)
- Fox Lake (Cochrane District)
- Fox Lake (Muskoka District)
- Fox Lake (Ignace)
- Fox Lake (Lake of the Woods, Kenora District)
- Fox Lake (Algoma District)
- Fox Lake (Goschen Township, Killarney)
- Fox Lake (Fox Creek, Killarney)
- Fox Lake (Mongowin Township, Sudbury District)
- Fox Lake (Whitestone)
- Foxear Lake
- Foxhead Lake (Thunder Bay District)
- Foxhead Lake (Kenora District)
- Foxhead Lake (Timiskaming District)
- Foxpaw Lake
- Foxtail Lake
- Foxtrap Lake
- Foxxe Lake
- Foy Lake (Cochrane District)
- Foy Lake (Nipissing District)
- Foy Lake (Foy Township, Sudbury District)
- Foy Lake (Semple Township, Sudbury District)
- Foyross Lake
- Foys Lake (Nipissing District)
- Foys Lake (Renfrew County)

== Fr ==
- Fra Lake
- Fradin Lake
- Frain Lake
- Frair Lake
- Fraleck Lake
- Fraleck's Pond
- Fraleigh Lake
- Framan Lake
- Frame Lake
- Fran Lake (Algoma District)
- Fran Lake (Rainy River District)
- Frances Lake (Sudbury District)
- Frances Lake (Nipissing District)
- Frances Lake (Kenora District)
- Frances Lake (Cochrane District)
- Francesca Lake
- Francille Lake
- Francis Lake (Algoma District)
- Francis Lake (Eldridge Township, Nipissing District)
- Francis Lake (Kenora District)
- Francis Lake (Grey County)
- Francis Lake (Lennox and Addington County)
- Francis Lake (Thunder Bay District)
- Francis Lake (Edgar Township, Nipissing District)
- Francis Lake (White Township, Nipissing District)
- Francis Lake (Olrig Township, Nipissing District)
- Franciscan Lake
- Francklyn Lake
- Frank Lake (Thunder Bay District)
- Frank Lake (Sudbury District)
- Frank Lake (Parry Sound District)
- Frank Lake (Timiskaming District)
- Frank Lake (Haliburton County)
- Frank Ponds
- Frank's Lake
- Frankfurth Lake
- Frankish Lake
- Franklin Lake (Kenora District)
- Franklin Lake (Rainy River District)
- Franklin Lake (Algoma District)
- Franklin Lake (Sudbury District)
- Franklin Pond
- Franks Lake (Sudbury District)
- Franks Lake (Madawaska Valley)
- Franks Lake (Algoma District)
- Franks Lake (Greater Madawaska)
- Franky Lake
- Frantz Pond
- François Lake
- Frappier Lake (Thunder Bay District)
- Frappier Lake (Sudbury District)
- Fraser Lake (Frontenac County)
- Fraser Lake (Haliburton County)
- Fraser Lake (Sturgeon Lake, Thunder Bay District)
- Fraser Lake (Renfrew County)
- Fraser Lake (Haines Township, Thunder Bay District)
- Fraser Lake (Parry Sound District)
- Fraser Lake (Muskoka District)
- Fraser Lake (Greater Sudbury)
- Fraser Lake (Hastings County)
- Fraser Lake (Algoma District)
- Fraser Lake (Sudbury District)
- Fraser Lake (Timiskaming District)
- Frater Lake
- Fraud Lake
- Frawley Lake
- Frawly Lake
- Frazer Lake
- Frazier Lake
- Frechette Lake
- Fred Lake (St. Ignace Island, Thunder Bay District)
- Fred Lake (Timiskaming District)
- Fred Lake (Rainy River District)
- Fred Lake (Nickle Township, Thunder Bay District)
- Fredart Lake
- Freddie Lake
- Frederick House Lake
- Frederick Lake (Timiskaming District)
- Frederick Lake (Sudbury District)
- Frederickson Lake
- Freds Lake
- Free Lake
- Freeborn Lake
- Freed Lake
- Freeland Lake
- Freele Lake
- Freeman Lake (Cochrane District)
- Freeman Lake (Frontenac County)
- Freeman Lake (Sudbury District)
- Freen Lake
- French Lake (Kenora District)
- French Lake (Thunder Bay District)
- French Lake (Rainy River District)
- French Lake (Cochrane Disitrct)
- Frenchman Lake
- Frenchmans Lake
- Frere Lake
- Fresque Lake
- Freure Lake
- Freve Lake
- Frey Lake (Parry Sound District)
- Frey Lake (Sudbury District)
- Freymond Lake
- Fricker Lake
- Friday Lake (Cochrane District)
- Friday Lake (Nipissing District)
- Friday Lake (Sudbury District)
- Friday Lake (McEwing Township, Algoma District)
- Friday Lake (Royal Township, Algoma District)
- Friendly Lake (Broughton Township, Algoma District)
- Friendly Lake (McIlveen Township, Algoma District)
- Frigid Lake
- Frill Lake
- Frise Lake
- Frith Lake (Thunder Bay District)
- Frith Lake (Sudbury District)
- Fritsch Lake
- Fritz Lake
- Froats Lake
- Frobel Lake
- Frog Lake (Creelman Township, Sudbury District)
- Frog Lake (Coleman)
- Frog Lake (Lincoln Township, Sudbury District)
- Frog Lake (Ray Township, Timiskaming District)
- Frog Lake (Frontenac County)
- Frog Lake (Nipissing District)
- Frog Lake (Thunder Bay District)
- Frog Pond
- Frogfly Lake
- Froggy Lake (Thunder Bay District)
- Froggy Lake (Nipissing District)
- Frogharbour Lake
- Frond Lake
- Frontier Lake (Cochrane District)
- Frontier Lake (Nipissing District)
- Frood Lake
- Froome Lake
- Frost Lake (Sudbury District)
- Frost Lake (Nebonaionquet Township, Algoma District)
- Frost Lake (Frost Township, Algoma District)
- Frost Lake (Haliburton County)
- Frost Lake (Parry Sound District)
- Froude Lake
- Fry Lake (Kenora District)
- Fry Lake (Sudbury District)
- Fryer Lake
- Frying Pan Lake (Thunder Bay District)
- Frying Pan Lake (Algoma District)
- Fryingpan Lake (Cochrane District)
- Fryingpan Lake (Timiskaming District)
- Frypan Lake

== Fu–Fy ==
- Fuchsite Lake
- Fugere Lake
- Fulcher Lake
- Fulford Lake
- Fuller Lake
- Fullerton Lake (Algoma District)
- Fullerton Lake (Thunder Bay District)
- Fume Lake
- Fummerton Lake
- Funger Lake
- Fungus Lake
- Funnel Lake
- Funnybone Lake
- Funston Lake
- Furcate Lake
- Furlonge Lake
- Furniss Lake
- Furnival Lake
- Furrow Lake
- Furry Lake
- Fushimi Lake
- Futh Lake
- Futile Lake
- Fyfe Lake
