= Jocko River =

Jocko River may refer to:

- Jocko River (Ontario), Canada
- Jocko River (Montana), United States

== See also ==
- Little Jocko River, Ontario, Canada
