= Ferguson Lake =

Ferguson Lake may refer to:

== Canada ==
- Hector Ferguson Lake, British Columbia
- Nunavut
  - Ferguson Lake (Kivalliq Region)
  - Tahiryuaq formerly known as Ferguson Lake
- Nova Scotia
  - Ferguson Lake (Nova Scotia), Cape Breton Regional Municipality
- Ontario
  - Nipissing District
    - Ferguson Lake (Stewart Township)
    - Ferguson Lake (Temagami)
  - Ferguson Lake (Sudbury District)

== Greenland ==
- Ferguson Lake (Tasersuatsiaq)

== United States ==
- Ferguson Lake, Pulaski County, Arkansas
- Ferguson Lake, Searcy County, Arkansas
- Ferguson Lake, southwest Arizona
- Ferguson Lake, California
- Ferguson Lake, Pasco County, Florida
- Ferguson Lake, Penobscot County, Maine
- Ferguson Lake, Michigan
- Ferguson Lake, Montana
- Ferguson Lake, Colfax County, New Mexico
- Ferguson Lake, Westchester County, New York
- Ferguson Lake, Allendale County, South Carolina
- Ferguson Lake, Texas
- Ferguson Lake, Washington
- Ferguson Lake, Douglas County, Wisconsin
- Lake Ferguson, Mississippi
