= Brule Lake (Ontario) =

Brule Lake or Brûlé Lake or Lac Brûlé or Lac Brulé may refer to one of nine lakes in Ontario, Canada:

- Brule Lake (Frontenac County)
- Nipissing District
  - Brûlé Lake (Stewart Township)

== See also ==
- Brule Lake (disambiguation)
