= Fisher Lake =

Fisher Lake may refer to:

- Many lakes in Ontario - see List of lakes of Ontario: F#Fi
- Fisher Lake (Michigan), Gogebic County, Michigan
- Fisher Lake (Minnesota), Scott County, Minnesota
- O.C. Fisher Lake, San Angelo, Texas

== See also ==
- Fishers Lake (Arkansas), Ouachita County, Arkansas
- Fishers Lake (Michigan), St Joseph County, Michigan
- Fischer Lake, Orlando, Florida
