= Black Duck Creek (Ontario) =

- Location of the mouth of Black Duck Creek in Ontario

Location
- Country: Canada
- Province: Ontario
- Region: Northeastern Ontario
- District: Nipissing

Physical characteristics
- Source: Unnamed bog
  - coordinates: 46°41′12″N 79°29′05″W
  - elevation: 315 m (1,033 ft)
- Mouth: Jocko River
  - coordinates: 46°39′39″N 79°27′24″W
  - elevation: 308 m (1,010 ft)

Basin features
- River system: Saint Lawrence River drainage basin

Black Duck Creek is a stream in geographic Osborne Township in the Unorganized North Part of Nipissing District in Northeastern Ontario, Canada. It is in the Saint Lawrence River drainage basin, is a left tributary of the Jocko River, and lies entirely within Jocko Rivers Provincial Park.

Black Duck Creek begins at an unnamed bog next to the community of Osborne on the Ontario Northland Railway. It travels south adjacent to the railway, takes in one and then a second unnamed right tributary, and turns east. The creek takes in an unnamed left tributary, and reaches its mouth at the Jocko River, immediately after that river flows out of its source at Jocko Lake. The Jocko River flows via the Ottawa River to the Saint Lawrence River.

== See also ==
- List of rivers of Ontario
