= Foxear Creek =

- Location of the creek mouth in Ontario

Location
- Country: Canada
- State: Ontario
- Region: Northwestern Ontario
- District: Thunder Bay
- Municipality: Greenstone

Physical characteristics
- Source: Foxear Lake
  - coordinates: 49°42′57″N 87°39′41″W
  - elevation: 326 m (1,070 ft)
- Mouth: Namewaminikan River
  - coordinates: 49°43′15″N 87°55′25″W
  - elevation: 299 m (981 ft)

Basin features
- River system: Great Lakes Basin

Foxear Creek is a stream in the municipality of Greenstone, Thunder Bay District in northwestern Ontario, Canada. It is in the Great Lakes Basin and is a left tributary of the Namewaminikan River. The river lies in the geographic townships of Sandra, Irwin and Walters.

== Course ==
The river begins at Foxear Lake. It travels west through a series of lakes, flows under Ontario Highway 801, and arrives at Bearskin Lake. It continues west through Windigokan Lake before reaching its mouth at the Namewaminikan River. The Namewaminikan River flows via Lake Nipigon and the Nipigon River to Lake Superior.

== Sources ==
- Map 14 (PDF) (Map). 1 : 1,600,000. Official road map of Ontario. Ministry of Transportation of Ontario. 2014.
- Restructured municipalities - Ontario map #2 (Map). Restructuring Maps of Ontario. Ontario Ministry of Municipal Affairs and Housing. 2006. Archived from the original on 2014-04-10.
