= Gathering Lake =

Lake in Ontario, Canada

- Location in Ontario
- Location: Thunder Bay District, Ontario
- Coordinates: 49°25′30″N 87°27′51″W
- Part of: Great Lakes Basin
- Primary inflows: Namewaminikan River, Roslyn River, Margret Creek
- Primary outflows: Namewaminikan River
- Basin countries: Canada
- Max. length: 12.5 km (7.8 mi)
- Max. width: 1.2 km (0.7 mi)
- Surface elevation: 378 metres (1,240 ft)

Gathering Lake is a long, narrow lake in Thunder Bay District in northwestern Ontario, Canada. It is in the Great Lakes Basin.

The main inflow is the Namewaminikan River at the east. Secondary inflows are the Roslyn River at the south and Margret Creek northeast. The major outflow, at the north, is also the Namewaminikan River, which flows via Lake Nipigon and the Nipigon River to Lake Superior.
