= Sucker Creek (Osborne Township) =

- Location of the mouth of Sucker Creek in Ontario

Location
- Country: Canada
- Province: Ontario
- Region: Northeastern Ontario
- District: Nipissing
- Geographic township: Osborne Township

Physical characteristics
- Source: Sucker Lake
  - coordinates: 46°42′19″N 79°24′55″W
  - elevation: 306 m (1,004 ft)
- Mouth: Little Sucker Lake
  - coordinates: 46°41′55″N 79°23′55″W
  - elevation: 306 m (1,004 ft)
- Length: 2.5 km (1.6 mi)

Basin features
- River system: Saint Lawrence River drainage basin

Sucker Creek is a stream in geographic Osborne Township in the Unorganized North Part of Nipissing District in Northeastern Ontario, Canada. It is in the Saint Lawrence River drainage basin and is a tributary of Little Sucker Lake. Sucker Creek forms part of the border of Jocko Rivers Provincial Park.

== Course ==
Sucker Creek begins at the southern tip of Sucker Lake and flows 2.5 kilometres (1.6 mi) southeast along a boggy course to the northwest side of Little Sucker Lake. Little Sucker Lake flows via the Jocko River and the Ottawa River to the Saint Lawrence River. The creek has one, unnamed right tributary, arriving mid-course from an unnamed lake.

== See also ==
- List of rivers of Ontario
