= Foxear Lake =

Lake in Ontario, Canada

- Location in Ontario
- Location: Thunder Bay District, Ontario
- Coordinates: 49°43′11″N 87°38′46″W
- Part of: Great Lakes Basin
- Primary inflows: Unnamed creek
- Primary outflows: Foxear Creek
- Basin countries: Canada
- Max. length: 2 km (1.2 mi)
- Max. width: .5 km (0.3 mi)
- Surface elevation: 326 metres (1,070 ft)

Foxear Lake is a lake in the municipality of Greenstone, Thunder Bay District in northwestern Ontario, Canada. It is in the Great Lakes Basin, lies in the geographic township of Walters, and is the source of Foxear Creek.

The main inflow is an unnamed creek at the northwest. The major outflow, at the west, is Foxear Creek, which flows via the Namewaminikan River, Lake Nipigon and the Nipigon River to Lake Superior.

Ontario Highway 801 passes 4 kilometres (2.5 mi) to the west.
