= Corrigan Lake (Thunder Bay District) =

Lake in Ontario, Canada

- Location in Ontario
- Location: Thunder Bay District, Ontario
- Coordinates: 49°42′25″N 87°54′38″W
- Part of: Great Lakes Basin
- Primary inflows: Unnamed creek
- Primary outflows: Corrigan Creek
- Basin countries: Canada
- Max. length: 1.7 km (1.1 mi)
- Max. width: .2 km (0.1 mi)
- Surface elevation: 321 m (1,053 ft)

Corrigan Lake is a lake in the municipality of Greenstone, Thunder Bay District in northwestern Ontario, Canada. It is in the Great Lakes Basin, lies in the geographic townships of Sandra and Irwin, and is the source of Corrigan Creek.

The main inflow is an unnamed creek at the east. The major outflow, at the west, is Corrigan Creek, which flows via the Namewaminikan River, Lake Nipigon and the Nipigon River to Lake Superior.
