= Little Sucker Lake =

- Location in Ontario
- Location: Nipissing District, Ontario
- Coordinates: 46°41′50″N 79°23′49″W
- Type: Lake
- Part of: Saint Lawrence River drainage basin
- Primary inflows: Sucker Creek
- Primary outflows: Jocko River
- Basin countries: Canada
- Max. length: 1,100 m (3,608.9 ft)
- Max. width: 300 m (984.3 ft)
- Surface elevation: 306 m (1,004 ft)

Little Sucker Lake is a lake in geographic Osborne Township in the Unorganized North Part of Nipissing District in Northeastern Ontario, Canada, about 7 kilometres (4.3 mi) east of the railway point of Osborne on the Ontario Northland Railway. It is in the Saint Lawrence River drainage basin, and is the location of the mouth of Sucker Creek, the lake's only inflow, arriving at the northwest of the lake from the direction of Sucker Lake. The outflow from Little Sucker Lake flows out at the south as a left tributary of the Jocko River, which flows via Ottawa River to the Saint Lawrence River. The lake is entirely within Jocko Rivers Provincial Park.

== See also ==
- Sucker Lake (Nipissing District)
- List of lakes in Ontario
