= Ontario Highway 533 =

Ontario provincial highway

Highway 533

Route information
- Maintained by Ministry of Transportation of Ontario
- Length: 53.2 km (33.1 mi)
- Existed: 1956–present

Major junctions
- South end: Highway 17 in Mattawa
- Highway 656
- North end: Highway 63 near Eldee

Location
- Country: Canada
- Province: Ontario
- Divisions: Nipissing District
- Towns: Mattawa

Highway system
- Ontario provincial highways; Current; Former; 400-series
← Highway 532	→ Highway 534

Secondary Highway 533, commonly referred to as Highway 533, is a provincially maintained secondary highway in the Canadian province of Ontario. The route begins in the town of Mattawa, at Highway 17, and travels north to Highway 63. Between these two junctions is a large barren expanse of wilderness with almost no habitation. Mattawa is the only community along the route. Highway 533 was assumed in 1956, along with many of the secondary highways in the province. It was later extended to Highway 63 in 1958, establishing the route as it remains today. A roundabout with Highway 17 was opened in late 2011, the first on a provincial highway in Ontario.

== Route description ==
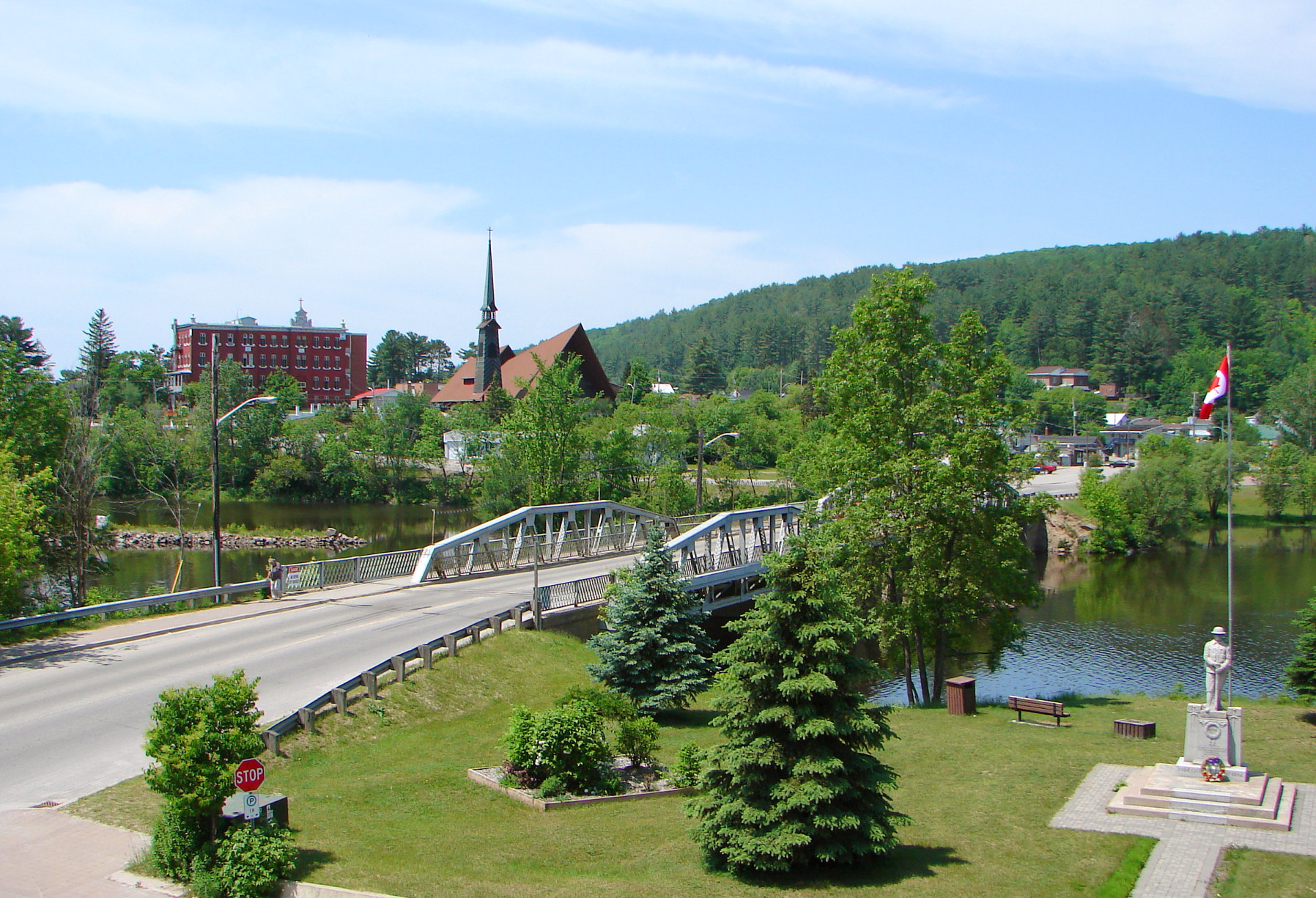
Highway 533 through Mattawa

At Mattawa, Highway 533 meets Highway 17 at a roundabout in the town's downtown area, adjacent to the shore of the Ottawa River. The route proceeds northwest as Main Street through the town before crossing the Mattawa River, north of which it is known as First Street. It continues out of the town alongside the Ottawa River for several kilometres before venturing eastward inland.

The route continues through the isolated terrain of the Canadian Shield, with the Boreal Forest surrounding the highway on both sides and very few signs of human habitation outside of Mattawa. It zig-zags north and northeast, avoiding numerous lakes and muskeg that dot the region, providing access to Alexander Lake Forest Provincial Park around its midpoint.

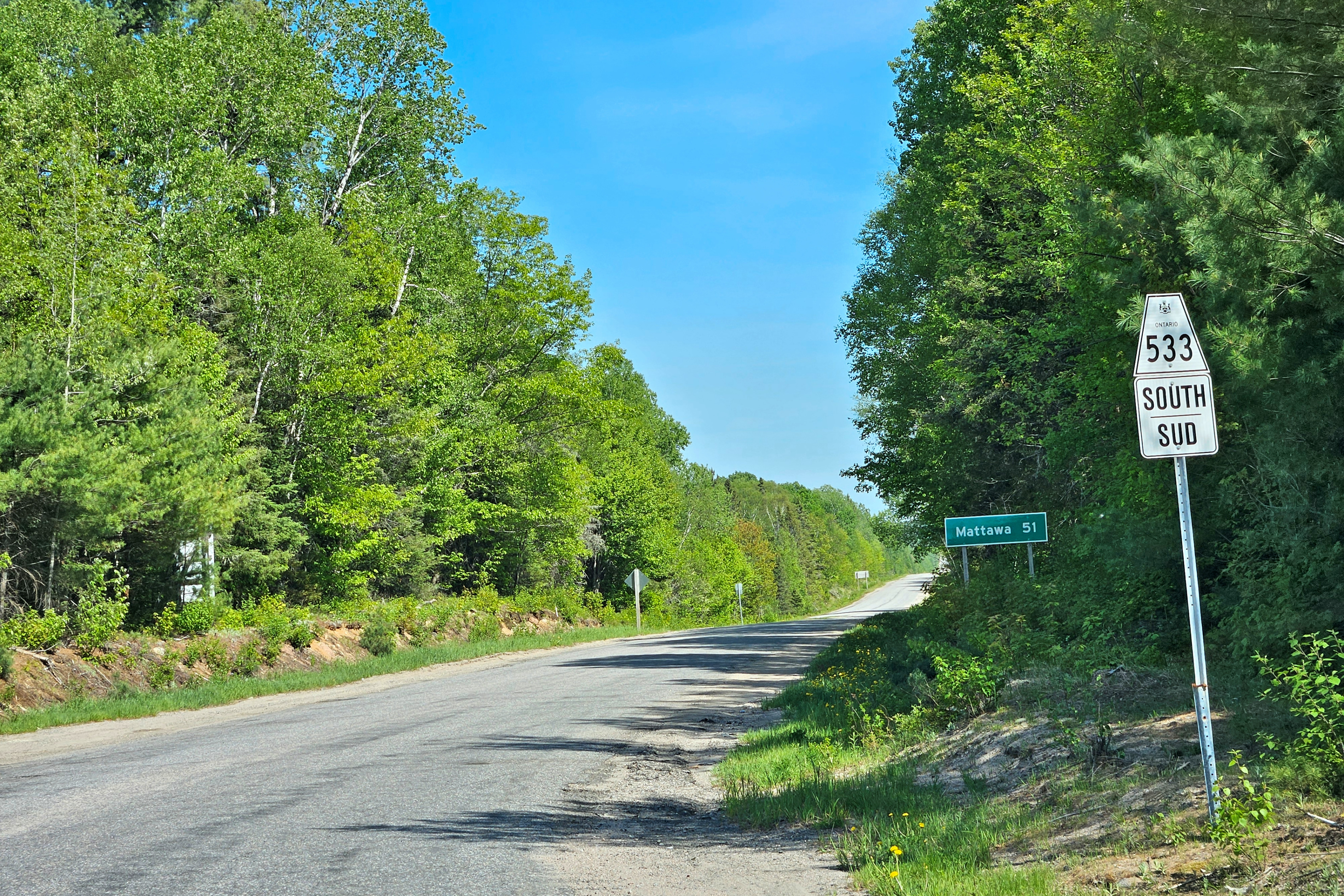
Highway 533 at its terminus with Highway 63

Highway 533 ends at an isolated junction with Highway 63 approximately 23.8 kilometres (14.8 mi) southwest of Témiscaming.

== History ==
The current route of Highway 533 was first assumed by the Department of Highways in early 1956, along with several dozen other secondary highways. It was likely maintained as a development road prior to that. When it was assumed, the route was approximately 15 kilometres (9.3 mi) in length, terminating at its present intersection with Forest Acres Road. It was paved as far north as the Antoine Creek crossing. By 1958 the route was extended north to Highway 63. In 1962, work began on paving the gravel sections of the highway. Construction was completed by 1973, and the route has remained unchanged since then.

In September 2010, the Ministry of Transportation of Ontario announced upgrades to the intersection with Highway 17, including the construction of the first roundabout on a provincial highway. Construction began later that month and was completed in late November 2011.

== Major intersections ==
The following table lists the major junctions along Highway 533. The entirety of the route is located within Nipissing District.

Location	km	Destinations	Notes
Mattawa	0.0	Highway 17 – North Bay, Ottawa	Roundabout
Mattawan Township	4.7	Highway 656 (La Cave Road)	Access to Holden Generating Station
Unorganized Nipissing District	53.2	Highway 63 – North Bay, Quebec	
1.000 mi = 1.609 km; 1.000 km = 0.621 mi
