= Bearskin Lake (Thunder Bay District) =

Lake in Thunder Bay District, Ontario, Canada

- Location in Ontario
- Location: Thunder Bay District, Ontario
- Coordinates: 49°42′23″N 87°45′58″W
- Part of: Great Lakes Basin
- Primary inflows: Foxear Creek
- Primary outflows: Foxear Creek
- Basin countries: Canada
- Max. length: 1.2 km (0.7 mi)
- Max. width: .5 km (0.3 mi)
- Surface elevation: 323 m (1,060 ft)

Bearskin Lake is a lake in the municipality of Greenstone, Thunder Bay District in northwestern Ontario, Canada. It is in the Great Lakes Basin and lies in the geographic townships of Irwin and Walters. Ontario Highway 11, forming at this point part of the Trans-Canada Highway, passes 4.5 kilometres (2.8 mi) to the south, and Ontario Highway 801 passes 2.3 kilometres (1.4 mi) to the east.

The main inflow is Foxear Creek arriving at the south from Clearall Lake. A secondary inflow is an unnamed creek at the east. The major outflow, at the west, is also the Foxear Creek, which flows via the Namewaminikan River, Lake Nipigon and the Nipigon River to Lake Superior.
