= Sturgeon Lake (Nipissing District) =

- Location in Ontario
- Location: Nipissing District, Ontario
- Coordinates: 46°32′41″N 79°25′06″W
- Type: Lake
- Part of: Great Lakes Basin
- Primary outflows: channel to Little Tomiko Lake
- Basin countries: Canada
- Max. length: 1.2 km (0.7 mi)
- Max. width: 0.68 km (0.42 mi)
- Surface elevation: 351 m (1,152 ft)

Sturgeon Lake is a lake located 2.0 km (1.2 mi) south of Tomiko and 8.0 km (5.0 mi) north-east of Highway 11 / Trans-Canada Highway in the Nipissing District of northeastern Ontario, Canada. It is in geographic Stewart Township and is part of the Great Lakes Basin.

The lake flows west through a 550 m (1,804 ft) channel into Little Tomiko Lake; the Ontario Northland Railway line from North Bay to Cochrane crosses that channel. Little Tomiko Lake empties via the Little Tomiko River, the Tomiko River, the Sturgeon River, Lake Nipissing, and the French River to Georgian Bay on Lake Huron.

== See also ==
- List of lakes of Ontario
