= McLaren's Bay =

- Dispersed rural community
- Location in Ontario
- Coordinates: 46°51′05″N 79°14′30″W
- Country: Canada
- Province: Ontario
- District: Nipissing
- Geographic Township: Parkman
- Elevation: 196 m (643 ft)
- Time zone: UTC-5 (Eastern Time Zone)
  - Summer (DST): UTC-4 (Eastern Time Zone)
- Area codes: 705, 249

McLaren's Bay is a Dispersed rural community and unincorporated place in geographic Parkman Township in the Unorganized North Part of Nipissing District in Central Ontario, Canada. The community lies on the eponymous McLaren's Bay on the west shore of Lake Timiskaming, at the mouth of Opimika Creek. McLaren's Point is just north of the community.

A tertiary road leads from McLaren's Bay southwest to the railway point of Diver, on the Ontario Northland Railway, and—via a subsequent branching tertiary road—south to Ontario Highway 63, at a point about halfway between that highway's crossing over the Jocko River and Lake Timiskaming.
