= Brule Lake =

Brule Lake, Brûlé Lake or Lac Brûlé may refer to:

== Canada ==
- Brûlé Lake (Alberta)
- Brule Lake (Frontenac County), one of nine lakes with this name in Ontario
- Brûlé Lake (Stewart Township), one of nine lakes with this name in Ontario
- Brûlé Lake (Romaine), a lake on the Romaine River in Quebec
- Brûlé Lake (Lac-Jacques-Cartier), in Lac-Jacques-Cartier, La Côte-de-Beaupré Regional County Municipality, Capitale-Nationale, Quebec

== United States ==
- Brule Lake (Michigan-Wisconsin), on the Michigan/Wisconsin border
- Brule Lake (Minnesota)
