= Tilden Lake =

- Unincorporated community
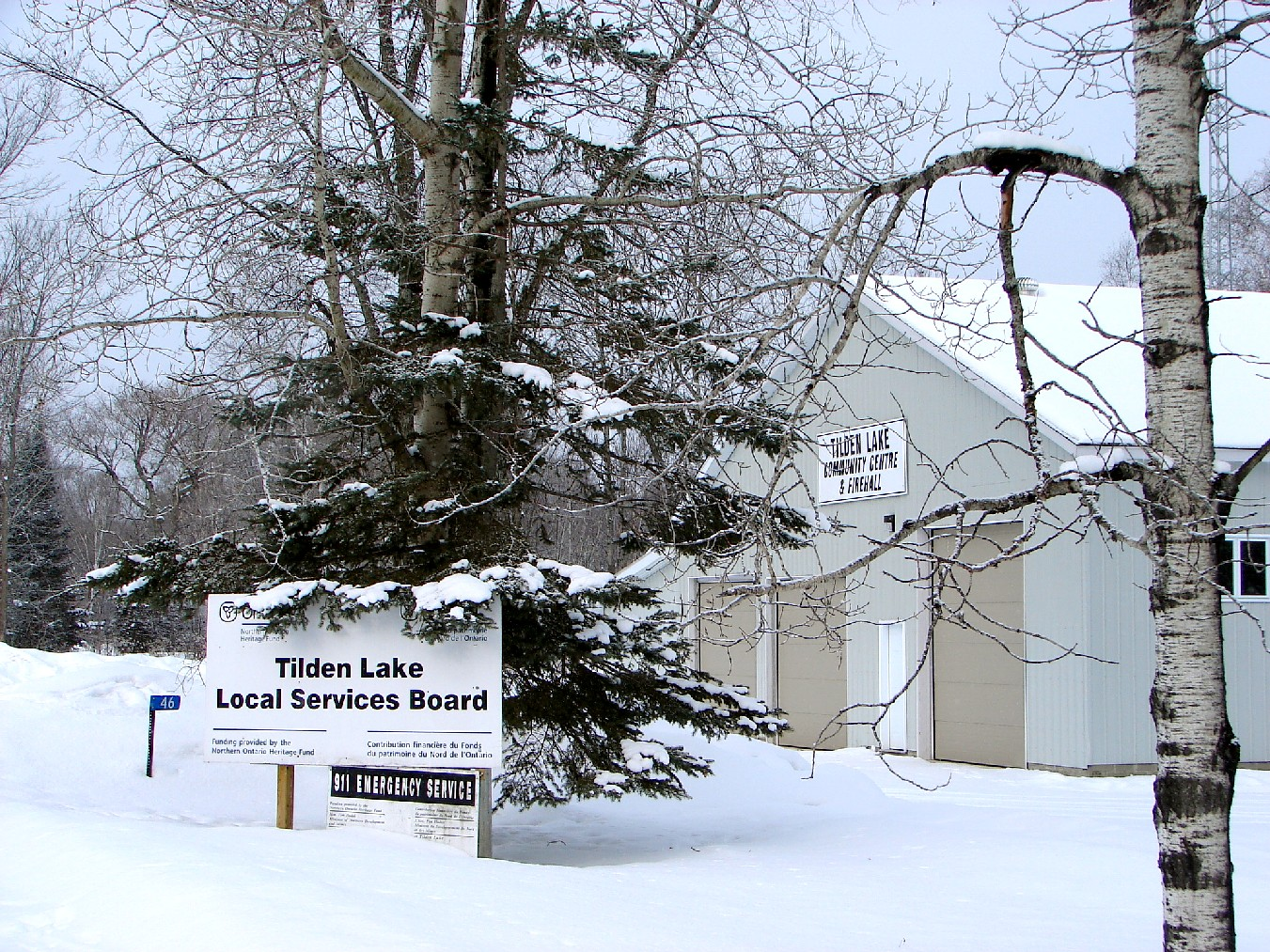
- Tilden Lake community and fire hall

- Location within Ontario
- Coordinates: 46°35′30″N 79°38′18″W
- Country: Canada
- Province: Ontario
- District: Nipissing
- Census subdiv.: Unorg. North Nipissing

Government
  - Fed. riding: Nipissing—Timiskaming
  - Prov. riding: Timiskaming—Cochrane
- Elevation: 286 m (938 ft)
- Time zone: UTC−5 (EST)
  - Summer (DST): UTC−4 (EDT)
- Postal code: P0H 2K0
- Area code(s): 705

Tilden Lake is a community in Ontario, Canada, about 35 kilometres (22 mi) from North Bay along Highway 11. It is in the unorganized North Part of the Nipissing census subdivision. The community, located on the namesake lake, is administered by a local services board.

== History ==
Logging of the area began in the early 1900s. The Ferguson Highway (now Highway 11) was built in 1926. In the 1940s, the government sold lots and cottages were built on the lake.

Tilden Lake was a timber mill in the 1920s and '30s and part of the '40s. The mill was owned by the Ellsmere Brothers and employed over 500 strong lumberjacks and millers. A fire destroyed the mill and it shut down for good in the early 1950s for economic reasons. However, a few families stayed behind and made the commute to nearby North Bay and Temagami. The main village road was named for the brothers and now is called the village road and Ellsmere road. The actual Tilden Lake was the upper lake where the timber was left to take on water before it was "run" down the river to Elbo Lake to be processed in the mill.
