= Ferguson Lake (Stewart Township) =

- Location in Ontario
- Location: Nipissing District, Ontario
- Coordinates: 46°33′36″N 79°24′29″W
- Type: Lake
- Part of: Saint Lawrence River drainage basin
- Basin countries: Canada
- Max. length: 930 metres (3,050 ft)
- Max. width: 440 metres (1,440 ft)
- Surface elevation: 350 metres (1,150 ft)

Ferguson Lake is a lake in the geographic Stewart Township, Nipissing District in Northeastern Ontario, Canada. It is part of the Saint Lawrence River drainage basin.

Ferguson Lake has two unnamed inflows, both at the southwest. The primary outflow is an unnamed creek at the east which flows through several lakes and eventually to the Little Jocko River. The Little Jocko River flows via the Jocko River and the Ottawa River to the Saint Lawrence River.

The Ontario Northland Railway passes through the community of Tomiko about 500 metres (1,600 ft) northwest of the lake.

== See also ==
- List of lakes in Ontario
