= Weepine Lake =

- Location in Southern Ontario
- Location: Haliburton County, Ontario
- Coordinates: 45°10′36″N 78°16′25″W
- Type: lake
- Part of: Ottawa River drainage basin
- Primary outflows: unnamed stream to Fourcorner Lake
- Basin countries: Canada
- Max. length: 390 metres (1,280 ft)
- Max. width: 300 metres (980 ft)
- Surface area: 4.14 hectares (10.2 acres)
- Surface elevation: 453 metres (1,486 ft)

Weepine Lake (French: lac Weepine) is a small lake in the municipality of Dysart et al, Haliburton County in Central Ontario, Canada. It is within Algonquin Provincial Park and is part of the Ottawa River drainage basin.

== Geography ==
Weepine Lake has an area of 4.14 hectares (10.2 acres) and lies at an elevation of 453 metres (1,486 ft). It is 390 metres (1,280 ft) long and 300 metres (980 ft) wide. The nearest named community is Kennaway, 8.5 kilometres (5.3 mi) to the east.

There two unnamed inflows, one at the north and one at the west. The primary outflow, at the south end of the lake, is an unnamed stream that flows south to Fourcorner Lake. Fourcorner Lake flows via Fourcorner Creek, Benoir Lake, the York River and the Madawaska River to the Ottawa River.
