= Jocko =

Male given name

Jocko is a nickname, often for John or Joseph. Notable people named Jocko include:

- Jocko Anderson (1892–1960), Canadian professional ice hockey player
- Joseph J. Clark (1893–1971), Native American US Navy admiral
- Jocko Collins (1905–1986), National Basketball Association referee and supervisor of officials
- Jocko Conlan (1899–1989), American Hall-of-Fame Major League Baseball umpire
- Jocko Conlon (1897–1987), Major League Baseball player
- Jocko Cunningham (born 1950), former racing driver who competed in the SCCA/ECAR Formula Atlantic series from 1986 to 1990
- Jocko Fields (1864–1950), Major League Baseball player
- Jocko Flynn (1864–1907), Major League Baseball pitcher
- Joaquín "Jack" García (born 1952), retired undercover FBI agent
- Jack Gotta (1929–2013), American football player, coach and general manager, mainly in the Canadian Football League
- Jocko Halligan (1868–1945), Major League Baseball player
- Jocko Henderson (1918–2000), American radio personality
- Luke Johnson (drummer) (born 1981), English rock drummer
- Jocko Maggiacomo (born 1947), NASCAR Winston Cup series driver
- Jocko Marcellino (born 1950), American musician and one of the founders of Sha Na Na
- Sherman Maxwell (1907–2008), African-American sportscaster and chronicler of Negro league baseball
- Jocko Milligan (1861–1923), Major League Baseball catcher
- Jack Nelson (American football coach) (1927–1978), American college and National Football League coach
- Jocko Sims (born 1981), American actor best known for his role as Anthony Adams (aka Panic) on the Starz network series Crash
- Gwyn Thomas (reporter) (1913–2010), Canadian crime reporter
- Jocko Thompson (1917–1988), Major League Baseball pitcher
- Jocko Willink (born 1972), retired United States Navy SEAL, author of Extreme Ownership, host of Jocko Podcast

== See also ==
- Jocko (walrus), a Pacific walrus at the Six Flags Discovery Kingdom in Vallejo California
- Jock (disambiguation)
