= Corrigan Creek (Ontario) =

- Location of the creek mouth in Ontario

Location
- Country: Canada
- State: Ontario
- Region: Northwestern Ontario
- District: Thunder Bay
- Municipality: Greenstone

Physical characteristics
- Source: Corrigan Lake
  - coordinates: 49°42′32″N 87°55′10″W
  - elevation: 321 m (1,053 ft)
- Mouth: Namewaminikan River
  - coordinates: 49°43′23″N 87°56′37″W
  - elevation: 300 m (980 ft)
- Length: 2.5 km (1.6 mi)

Basin features
- River system: Great Lakes Basin

Corrigan Creek is a stream in the municipality of Greenstone, Thunder Bay District in northwestern Ontario, Canada. It is in the Great Lakes Basin, is a left tributary of the Namewaminikan River, and lies in the geographic township of Sandra.

The river flows northwest 2.5 kilometres (1.6 mi) from Corrigan Lake to its mouth at the Namewaminikan River. The Namewaminikan River flows via Lake Nipigon and the Nipigon River to Lake Superior.

== Sources ==
- Map 14 (PDF) (Map). 1 : 1,600,000. Official road map of Ontario. Ministry of Transportation of Ontario. 2014.
- Restructured municipalities - Ontario map #2 (Map). Restructuring Maps of Ontario. Ontario Ministry of Municipal Affairs and Housing. 2006. Archived from the original on 2014-04-10.
