= La Salle Township, Ontario =

La Salle Township
- Geographic township
- Location in Ontario
- Coordinates: 46°45′12″N 79°26′41″W
- Country: Canada
- Province: Ontario
- District: Nipissing
- Part: Unorganized North
- Time zone: UTC-5 (Eastern Time Zone)
  - Summer (DST): UTC-4 (Eastern Time Zone)
- Area codes: 705, 249

La Salle Township is a geographic township in the Unorganized North Part of Nipissing District in Northeastern Ontario, Canada. The Ontario Northland Railway, constructed in the early 20th century, runs through the southwestern tip of the township.

Opimika Creek, a tributary of Lake Timiskaming, is in the township, as are — all or in part — the following lakes: Boland Lake, La Salle Lakes, Modder Lake, Opimika Lake, Raft Lake, Secord Lake, Serene Lake, Sucker Lake, Susy Lake.

A Hydro One transmission line traverses the township from north to south.
