= Partridge Lake (Namewaminikan River) =

Lake in Thunder Bay District, Ontario, Canada

- Location in Ontario
- Location: Thunder Bay District, Ontario
- Coordinates: 49°43′09″N 87°23′09″W
- Part of: Great Lakes Basin
- Primary inflows: Namewaminikan River
- Primary outflows: Namewaminikan River
- Basin countries: Canada
- Max. length: 10.5 km (6.5 mi)
- Max. width: 2 km (1.2 mi)
- Surface elevation: 328 m (1,076 ft)

Partridge Lake is a lake in the municipality of Greenstone, Thunder Bay District in northwestern Ontario, Canada. It is in the Great Lakes Basin.

The main inflow is the Namewaminikan River at the east. A secondary inflow is Legault Creek at the south. The major outflow, at the northwest, is also the Namewaminikan River which flows via Lake Nipigon and the Nipigon River to Lake Superior.
