= Brûlé Lake (Stewart Township) =

- Location in Ontario
- Location: Nipissing District, Ontario
- Coordinates: 46°36′31″N 79°25′53″W
- Type: Lake
- Part of: Saint Lawrence River drainage basin
- Primary outflows: Unnamed creek
- Basin countries: Canada
- Max. length: 2.0 kilometres (1.2 mi)
- Max. width: 1.0 kilometre (0.62 mi)
- Surface elevation: 329 metres (1,079 ft)

Brûlé Lake is a lake in geographic Stewart Township, Nipissing District in Northeastern Ontario, Canada. It is part of the Saint Lawrence River drainage basin.

Brûlé Lake has five unnamed inflows: one at the east; one at the southeast; one at the south; one at the west; and one at the north. The primary outflow is an unnamed creek at the north which heads in the direction of Jocko Lake, which flows via the Jocko River and the Ottawa River to the Saint Lawrence River.

The Ontario Northland Railway runs along the northeast shore of the lake; the railway passes through the community of Jocko about 2 kilometres (1.2 mi) north of the lake.

== See also ==
- List of lakes in Ontario
