= Roslyn River =

- Location of the river mouth in Ontario

Location
- Country: Canada
- State: Ontario
- Region: Northwestern Ontario
- District: Thunder Bay

Physical characteristics
- Source: Unnamed lake
  - coordinates: 49°11′03″N 87°30′16″W
  - elevation: 454 m (1,490 ft)
- Mouth: Gathering Lake
  - coordinates: 49°22′02″N 87°28′11″W
  - elevation: 378 m (1,240 ft)

Basin features
- River system: Great Lakes Basin

The Roslyn River is a river in Thunder Bay District in northwestern Ontario, Canada. It is in the Great Lakes Basin and is a right tributary of the Namewaminikan River.

== Course ==
The river begins at an unnamed lake in and flows north to Upper Roslyn Lake, where it takes in the three tributary creeks. It continues north, through the Rightwheel Narrows to Roslyn Lake, where it takes in the right tributary Drape Creek. The river heads northwest and reaches its mouth at Gathering Lake on the Namewaminikan River. The Namewaminikan River flows via Lake Nipigon and the Nipigon River to Lake Superior.

== Tributaries ==
- Roslyn Lake
  - Drape Creek (right)
- Upper Roslyn Lake
  - Candy Creek (left)
  - Klersy Creek (left)
  - Liver Creek (right)

== Sources ==
- Map 14 (PDF) (Map). 1 : 1,600,000. Official road map of Ontario. Ministry of Transportation of Ontario. 2014.
- Restructured municipalities - Ontario map #2 (Map). Restructuring Maps of Ontario. Ontario Ministry of Municipal Affairs and Housing. 2006.
