= Osborne Township, Ontario =

Osborne Township
- Geographic township
- Location in Ontario
- Coordinates: 46°39′51″N 79°26′49″W
- Country: Canada
- Province: Ontario
- District: Nipissing
- Part: Unorganized North
- Time zone: UTC-5 (Eastern Time Zone)
  - Summer (DST): UTC-4 (Eastern Time Zone)
- Area codes: 705, 249

Osborne Township is a geographic township in the Unorganized North Part of Nipissing District in Northeastern Ontario, Canada. The Ontario Northland Railway, constructed in the early 20th century, runs from the middle south to the northwest of the township. The dispersed rural community of Jocko, without any passing sidings, and the railway point of Osborne, with one passing siding, are at the middle south and northwest of the township respectively.

Osborne Township also contains the majority of the northwest part of Jocko Rivers Provincial Park. Within the park borders are Jocko Lake, the source of the Jocko River, and two tributaries of the Jocko River (in downstream order): Black Duck Creek and (via Little Sucker Lake) Sucker Creek. Other lakes all or in part in the township are Little Sucker Lake, Malone Lake and Sucker Lake. All are in the Saint Lawrence River drainage basin.

A Hydro One transmission line traverses the township from north to south.
