= Michaud River =

- Location of the mouth of the Michaud River in Ontario

Location
- Country: Canada
- Province: Ontario
- Region: Northeastern Ontario
- District: Sudbury

Physical characteristics
- Source: Little Michaud Lake
  - location: Tyrone Township
  - coordinates: 46°48′00″N 81°14′37″W
  - elevation: 427 m (1,401 ft)
- Mouth: Onaping River
  - location: Leinster Township
  - coordinates: 46°50′55″N 81°23′09″W
  - elevation: 389 m (1,276 ft)

Basin features
- River system: Great Lakes Basin

The Michaud River is a river in Sudbury District in Northeastern Ontario, Canada. It is in the Great Lakes Basin and is a left tributary of the Onaping River.

== Course ==
The creek begins at Little Michaud Lake in geographic Tyrone Township, and flows north to Michaud Lake. It exits the lake at the northwest and flows northwest to Shkowona Lake, then heads west, passes into geographic Leinster Township, and reaches its mouth at the Onaping River. The Onaping River flows via the Vermilion River and the Spanish River to Lake Huron.

== Tributaries ==
Both enter at Shkowona Lake.

- Venetian Creek (right)
- Sandcherry Creek (left)

== See also ==
- List of rivers of Ontario

== Sources ==
- Map 6 (PDF) (Map). 1 : 700,000. Official road map of Ontario. Ministry of Transportation of Ontario. 2014.
- Restructured municipalities - Ontario map #4 (Map). Restructuring Maps of Ontario. Ontario Ministry of Municipal Affairs and Housing. 2006.
