= Carhess Creek =

- Location of the mouth of Carhess Creek in Ontario

Location
- Country: Canada
- Province: Ontario
- Region: Northeastern Ontario
- District: Sudbury

Physical characteristics
- Source: Ferguson Lake
  - location: Hess Township, Sudbury District
  - coordinates: 46°43′46″N 81°30′29″W
  - elevation: 428 m (1,404 ft)
- Mouth: Onaping River
  - location: Levack Township, Greater Sudbury
  - coordinates: 46°42′45″N 81°24′48″W
  - elevation: 353 m (1,158 ft)

Basin features
- River system: Great Lakes Basin
- Tributaries
  - left: Depot Creek

Carhess Creek is a river in Greater Sudbury and Sudbury District in Northeastern Ontario, Canada. It is in the Great Lakes Basin and is a right tributary of the Onaping River. The name is a portmanteau of the names of two geographic townships through which it flows, Hess Township and Cartier Township.

The creek begins at Ferguson Lake in geographic Hess Township, Sudbury District, and flows south through Green Lake into geographic Cartier Township. It turns east, takes in the left tributary Depot Creek, passes into the northwest corner of geographic Levack Township, Greater Sudbury, flows over a series of rapids, heads around both sides of a small hill, and reaches its mouth at the Onaping River, upstream of the community of Levack. The Onaping River flows via the Vermilion River and the Spanish River to Lake Huron.

== Tributaries ==
- Depot Creek (left)

== Sources ==
- Map 6 (PDF) (Map). 1 : 700,000. Official road map of Ontario. Ministry of Transportation of Ontario. 2014.
- Restructured municipalities - Ontario map #4 (Map). Restructuring Maps of Ontario. Ontario Ministry of Municipal Affairs and Housing. 2006. Archived from the original on 2014-04-10.

== See also ==
- List of rivers of Ontario
