= Stewart Township, Ontario =

Stewart Township
- Geographic township
- Location in Ontario
- Coordinates: 46°34′44″N 79°26′49″W
- Country: Canada
- Province: Ontario
- District: Nipissing
- Part: Unorganized North
- Time zone: UTC-5 (Eastern Time Zone)
  - Summer (DST): UTC-4 (Eastern Time Zone)
- Area codes: 705, 249

Stewart Township is a geographic township in the Unorganized North Part of Nipissing District in Northeastern Ontario, Canada. The Ontario Northland Railway, constructed in the early 20th century, runs from south to north through the township, and the dispersed rural community of Tomiko with two passing sidings is on the railway in the centre-east.

Lakes that are all or in part in Stewart Township include Brûlé Lake, Ferguson Lake, Little Rock Lake, Little Tomiko Lake, Moose Lake, Notman Lake, and Sturgeon Lake.
