= Thorne, Ontario =

Unincorporated community in Ontario, Canada

Thorne
- Unincorporated community
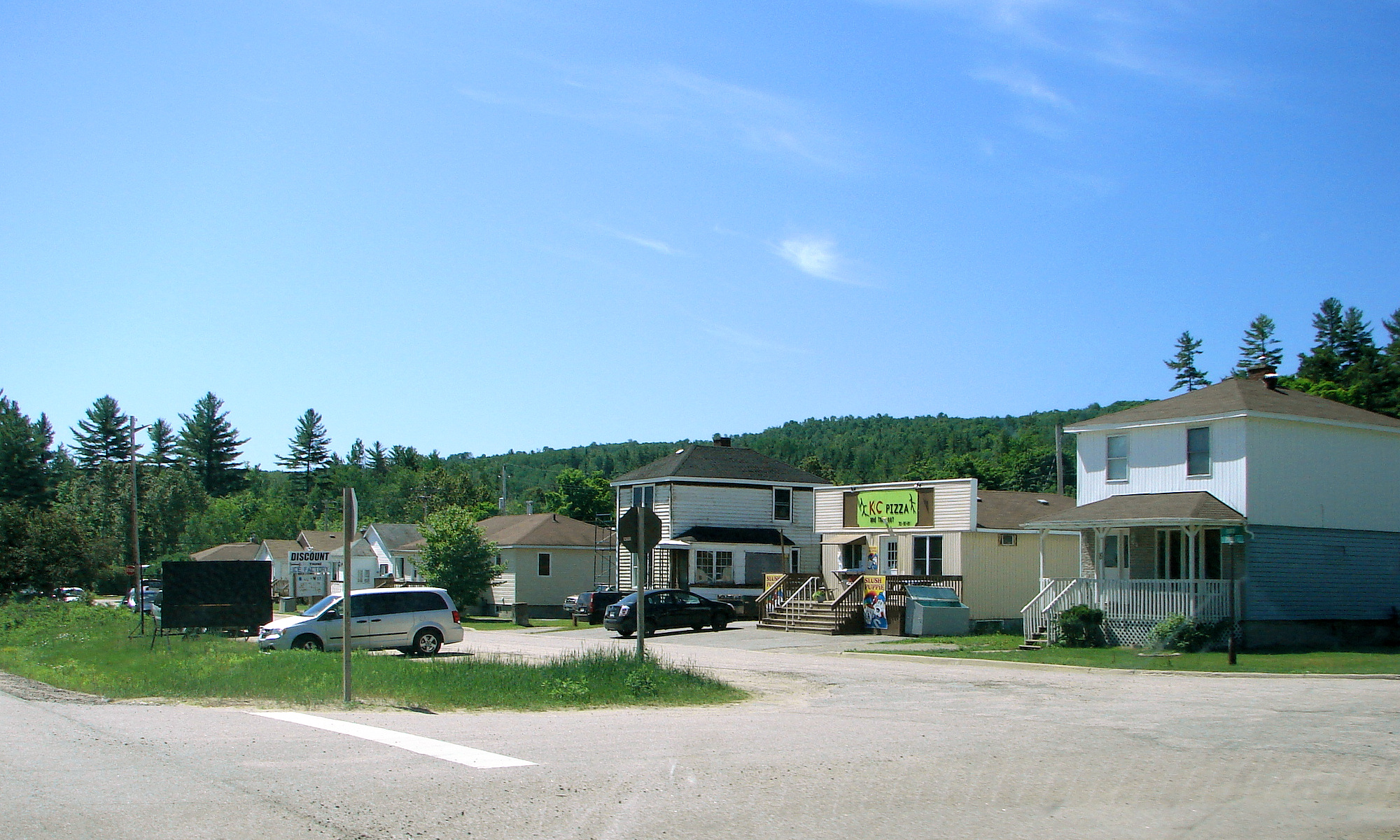

- Location within Ontario
- Coordinates: 46°42′02″N 79°06′08″W
- Country: Canada
- Province: Ontario
- District: Nipissing
- Census subdiv.: Unorg. North Nipissing
- Settled: 1940s

Government
  - Fed. riding: Nipissing—Timiskaming
  - Prov. riding: Timiskaming—Cochrane

Area
  - Land: 0.69 km^{2} (0.27 sq mi)

Population (2021)
  - Total: 172
  - Density: 249.8/km^{2} (647/sq mi)
- Time zone: UTC-5 (EST)
  - Summer (DST): UTC-4 (EDT)
- Postal code: P0H 2J0
- Area codes: 705

Thorne is an unincorporated community within the unincorporated township of Poitras, in the Canadian province of Ontario. It is located in the census division of Nipissing District. A designated place served by a local services board.

Thorne is located at the northernmost end of Highway 63, just across the Ottawa River from Témiscaming, Quebec. It is situated 63 kilometres (39 mi) northeast of North Bay.

== History ==
As early as 1942 a number of squatters had established themselves on CIP (Canadian International Paper) property on the Ontario side of the Ottawa River. Leo Armitage and Leo Dorion are attributed as the first white settlers at the location. The small grouping of houses would eventually take the name of Thorneville after C.B. Thorne, a Norwegian born engineer and technical director in charge of building the paper mill for the Riordon Pulp and Paper Co. between 1917-20. After the Second World War owing to a lack of housing lots within the company town site at Témiscaming, CIP decided to establish a secondary town site on the Ontario shore of the river. The company surveyed and serviced housing lots which it then sold to the public. In 1948 town site was built and the homes were privately owned unlike those at Témiscaming where the CIP still retained ownership of most of the town.

Although Thorne is a modern town site, the first residents to the area came be traced back to the 1870s when a depot farm was established to cater to the regions numerous lumber camps. The surrounding valley contains mostly poor rocky soil, however some good farm land was available approximately 3 km inland. Situated on steep slope, The Farm, as residents call the Boyce place, supplied fresh produce, meat, dairy and hay to the camps. The farm contained a number of families until it was abandoned during the 1950s. It supplied goods to Témiskaming by the Boyce clan from around 1900 to 1946.The first Ed Boyce then his brother James then his two sons Eldon and Gorden all originating in Manotick and North Gower Ontario and through time all went back.

The first grocery store was operated by Mr. and Mrs Leo Cyr. In 1952, Mr. Paul Pharand established an additional grocery store. Thorne also had an Odd Fellows Hall which hosted dances. The village was settled by both francophones and anglophones, the majority of whom worked at the lumber mills located across the river in Témiskaming. In 1951, Thorne counted 267 residents. In 1956 Thorne counted 401 residents, 416 in 1961 and maintained this figure for three decades as it still counted 425 residents in 1980. However, by 1990 Thorne's population had dropped to 230 residents. The decline in population is mostly attributed to the large retired population and smaller family units. Though in recent years younger families have been relocating to community. In 2006, Thorne counted 254 residents, and 196 in 2011. In 2016, the census counted 204 residents in the village.

Due to the construction of the Otto Holden Generating Station in 1950, the water levels along the Ottawa river changed the riverfront of the village and large white pine trees were cut down.

At various times Thorne did contain a few services such as a post office, service station, 2 general stores, propane dealer, a ski resort, skating rink as well as an English Public school and a French Separate school. In the mid 1980s a sea food restaurant operated and Catholic masses were conducted in the French language for a number of years the school's gymnasium through the Parish of Sainte-Thérese, domiciled in Témiscaming, Quebec. In the 1990s a veterinary office operated for a decade.

Today only the French Language Separate School, a nursing station, a restaurant, and the post office remains to service the community. Other services are obtained in Témiscaming, Quebec or in North Bay, Ontario.

== Demographics ==
In the 2021 Census of Population conducted by Statistics Canada, Thorne had a population of 172 living in 77 of its 81 total private dwellings, a change of −15.7% from its 2016 population of 204. With a land area of 0.69 km^{2} (0.27 sq mi), it had a population density of 249.3/km^{2} (645.6/sq mi) in 2021.

Historical census populations – Thorne
Year	Pop.	±%
2006	254	—
2011	196	−22.8%
2016	204	+4.1%
2021	172	−15.7%
Source: Statistics Canada

Private dwellings occupied by usual residents (2021): 77 (total dwellings: 81)

Mother tongue (2021):

- English as first language: 61.8%
- French as first language: 32.4%
- English and French as first languages: 5.9%
- Other as first language: 0%
