= Mulock Township =

- Geographic township
- Location in Ontario
- Coordinates: 46°29′41″N 79°19′02″W
- Country: Canada
- Province: Ontario
- District: Nipissing
- Part: Unorganized North
- Time zone: UTC-5 (Eastern Time Zone)
  - Summer (DST): UTC-4 (Eastern Time Zone)
- Area codes: 705, 249

Mulock Township is a geographic township in the Unorganized North Part of Nipissing District in Northeastern Ontario, Canada, named for William Mulock. The Ontario Northland Railway, constructed in the early 20th century, runs through the southwestern tip of the township; the dispersed rural community of Mulock with a passing siding is located on the railway.

Anderson Lake and Valin Lake are in the township, as is the northern portion of Widdifield Forest Provincial Park.
