= Jocko Lake (Osborne Township) =

- Location in Ontario
- Location: Nipissing District, Ontario
- Coordinates: 46°38′40″N 79°26′56″W
- Type: Lake
- Part of: Saint Lawrence River drainage basin
- Primary outflows: Jocko River
- Basin countries: Canada
- Max. length: 3.6 kilometres (2.2 mi)
- Max. width: 0.9 kilometres (0.56 mi)
- Surface elevation: 308 metres (1,010 ft)

Jocko Lake is a lake in geographic Osborne Township, Nipissing District in Northeastern Ontario, Canada. It is part of the Saint Lawrence River drainage basin, is the source of the Jocko River, and lies entirely within Jocko Rivers Provincial Park.

Jocko Lake has six unnamed inflows: one at the east; three at the northeast; one at the southwest, arriving from the direction of Brûlé Lake; and two at the west. The primary outflow is the Jocko River, which flows via the Ottawa River to the Saint Lawrence River.

The Ontario Northland Railway runs along the southwest shore of the lake where it passes through the community of Jocko.

== See also ==
- List of lakes in Ontario
