= Ferguson Lake (Nova Scotia) =

Lake in Nova Scotia, Canada

- Location within Nova Scotia Location within Canada
- Location: Cape Breton Regional Municipality, Nova Scotia
- Coordinates: 45.971712°N 60.07496°W
- Basin countries: Canada

Ferguson Lake is a lake of Cape Breton Regional Municipality located in Nova Scotia, Canada.

== See also ==
- List of lakes in Nova Scotia
