= Mulock, Nipissing District =

Mulock
- Dispersed Rural Community
- Etymology: Named for William Mulock
- Location in Ontario
- Coordinates: 46°27′18″N 79°22′21″W
- Country: Canada
- Province: Ontario
- District: Nipissing
- Geographic Township: Mulock Township
- Elevation: 380 m (1,250 ft)
- Time zone: UTC-5 (Eastern Time Zone)
  - Summer (DST): UTC-4 (Eastern Time Zone)

Mulock is a dispersed rural community and unincorporated place in geographic Mulock Township, Nipissing District in Northeastern Ontario, Canada, named for William Mulock. It was created during the construction of the Ontario Northland Railway in the early 20th century. Mulock is located between the dispersed rural communities of Tomiko to the north and the Feronia to the south, and has a passing siding.
