= Ferguson Lake (Sudbury District) =

- Location in Ontario
- Location: Sudbury District, Ontario
- Coordinates: 46°43′52″N 81°30′29″W
- Type: Lake
- Part of: Great Lakes Basin
- Primary outflows: Carhess Creek
- Basin countries: Canada
- Max. length: 500 metres (1,640 ft)
- Max. width: 200 metres (660 ft)
- Surface elevation: 428 metres (1,404 ft)

Ferguson Lake is a lake in geographic Hess Township, Sudbury District in Northeastern Ontario, Canada. It is in the Great Lakes Basin and is the source of Carhess Creek.

There are no inflows. The primary outflow, at the south and leading south to Green Lake, is Carhess Creek, which flows via the Onaping River, the Vermilion River and the Spanish River to Lake Huron.

== See also ==
- List of lakes of Ontario
