= Jocko Valley =

Valley in Montana, United States

Coordinates: 47°14′30″N 114°10′09″W

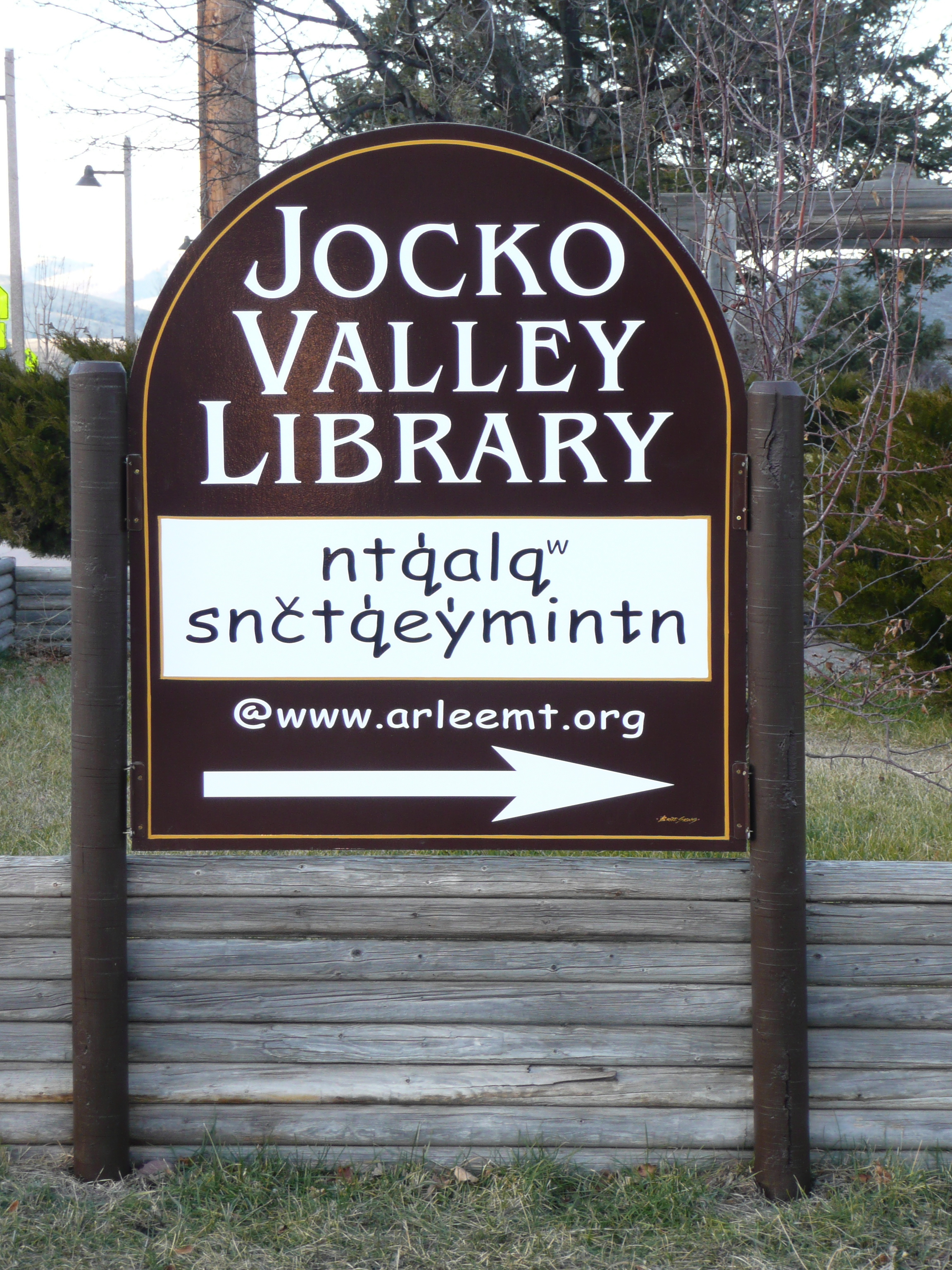
Jocko Valley Public Library sign, in English and Salish.

The Jocko Valley is located in western Montana in the northwestern United States. It is located on land of the Flathead Indian Reservation.

The valley was named for Jacques Raphael Finlay, a trapper and fur trader in the area during 1806–1809.

The Jocko Valley was the site of flooding in June 2011, when the Jocko River overflowed its banks as a result of a "200% of average" snowpack combined with heavy precipitation.
