= Fischer Lake =

Coordinates: 28.5389952°N 81.5180292°W

- Location within Florida
- Location: Between Ocoee, Florida and Orlando, Florida
- Type: Natural freshwater lake
- Basin countries: United States
- Max. length: 1,775 ft (541 m)
- Max. width: 1,000 ft (300 m)
- Surface area: 27 acres (11 ha)
- Surface elevation: 82 ft (25 m)

Fischer Lake, just southeast of Florida State Road 429, is a natural freshwater lake west of Orlando, Florida, in Orange County, Florida, United States. This lake is partially surrounded by residential housing, and Camp Ithiel is on its southwest shore. Most of its shores are swampy. It is listed in the Orange County Wateratlas as a private lake, and there is no public access along its shores.
