= Fourcorner Lake =

Lake in Haliburton County, Ontario, Canada

- Location in Southern Ontario
- Location: Haliburton County, Ontario
- Coordinates: 45.160°N 78.279°W
- Type: lake
- Etymology: from its location at a quadripoint
- Part of: Ottawa River drainage basin
- Primary outflows: Fourcorner Creek
- Basin countries: Canada
- Max. length: 1,750 metres (5,740 ft)
- Max. width: 1,040 metres (3,410 ft)
- Surface area: 99.73 hectares (246.4 acres)
- Surface elevation: 442 metres (1,450 ft)

Fourcorner Lake (French: lac Fourcorner) is a lake in the municipality of Dysart et al, Haliburton County in Central Ontario, Canada. It is partly within Algonquin Provincial Park and is in the Ottawa River drainage basin. The lake takes its name from its location at a quadripoint, the junction point of four geographic townships: Harburn at northwest, Bruton at the northeast, Harcourt at the southeast, and Dudley at the southwest.

== Geography ==
Fourcorner Lake has an area of 99.73 hectares (246.4 acres) and lies at an elevation of 442 metres (1,450 ft). It is 1,750 metres (5,740 ft) long and 1,050 metres (3,440 ft) wide. The nearest named community is Kennaway, 8.0 kilometres (5.0 mi) to the east. The portion of the lake in geographic Bruton Township, that is the northeast portion, is the part of the lake that is within Algonquin Provincial Park.

There are two unnamed inflows: one at the southwest; and one at the north, arriving from the direction of Weepine Lake. The primary outflow, at the east end of the lake, is Fourcorner Creek. Fourcorner Creek flows via Benoir Lake, the York River and the Madawaska River to the Ottawa River.
