= Onaping River =

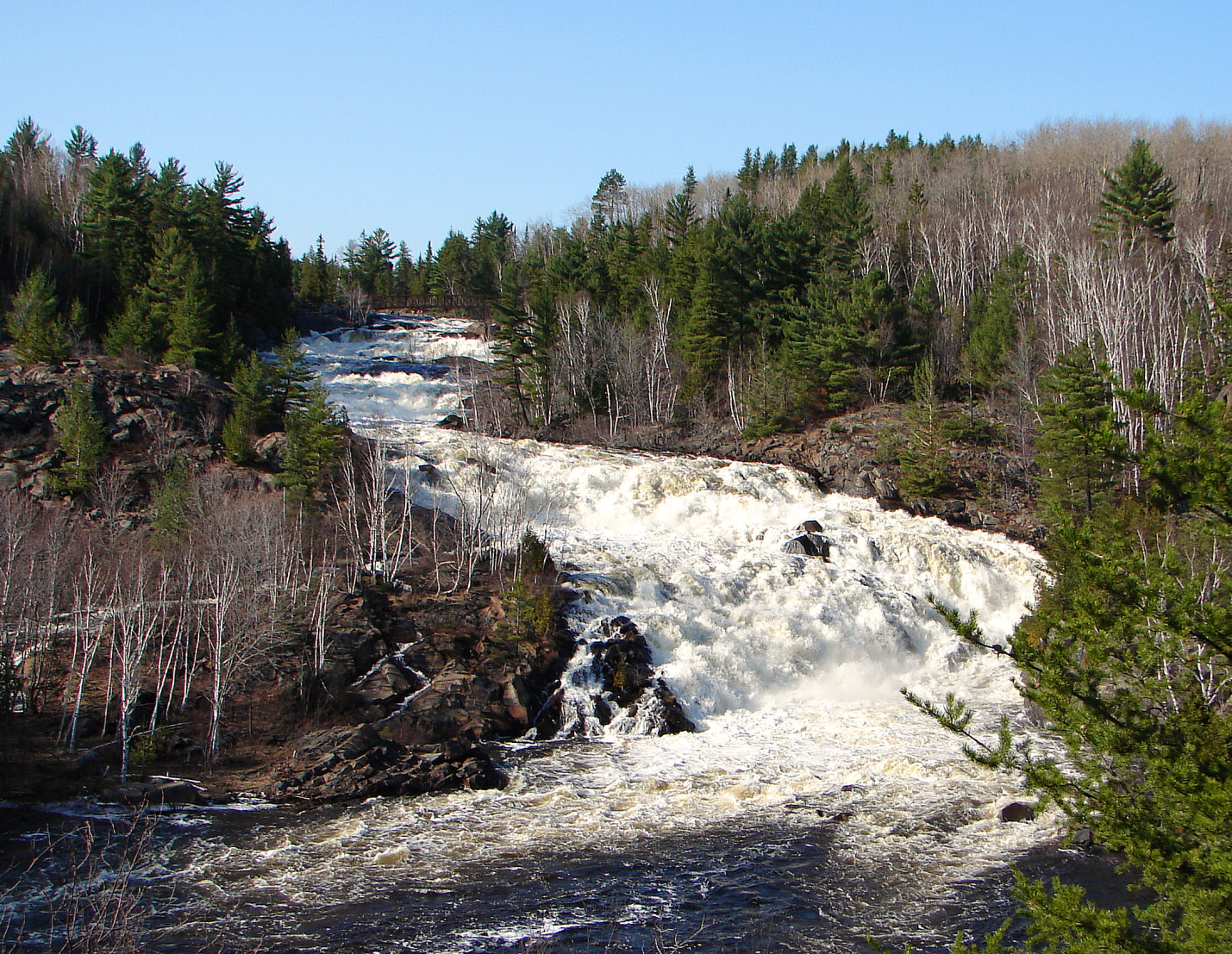
- High Falls on the Onaping River, from the A.Y. Jackson Lookout

- Location of the mouth of the Onaping River in Ontario

Location
- Country: Canada
- Province: Ontario
- Region: Northeastern Ontario

Physical characteristics
- Source: Onaping Lake
  - location: Emo Township, Sudbury District
  - coordinates: 46°55′02″N 81°27′35″W
  - elevation: 406 m (1,332 ft)
- Mouth: Vermilion River
  - location: Balfour Township, Greater Sudbury
  - coordinates: 46°36′23″N 81°17′58″W
  - elevation: 266 m (873 ft)

Basin features
- River system: Great Lakes Basin
- Tributaries
  - left: Michaud River
  - right: Carhess Creek

The Onaping River is a river in Greater Sudbury and Sudbury District in Northeastern Ontario, Canada. It is in the Great Lakes Basin and is a right tributary of the Vermilion River.

== Course ==
The creek begins at Onaping Dam on Turceotte Bay on Onaping Lake in geographic Emo Township, Sudbury District, and flows southeast then south, and takes in the left tributary Michaud River. It continues south, passes into geographic Levack Township, Greater Sudbury, takes in the right tributary Carhess Creek, flows over a long series of rapids, enters geographic Dowling Township and passes under Ontario Highway 144 at the community of Levack. The river then flows over the 55-metre (180 ft) High Falls, which can be viewed from a scenic lookout and nature and geologic trail accessible from the adjacent Ontario Highway 144 (the original Canadian Pacific Railway transcontinental main line — served on this portion of the track by the Via Rail Sudbury – White River train — is also tangent to the right bank of the river at this point). The falls were captured by renowned Group of Seven painter A. Y. Jackson. The scenic lookout is thus named in his honour. The falls area lies on fallback debris that resulted from the meteor impact that created the Sudbury Basin. The river then turns northeast, heads past the community of Dowling, enters the northwestern portion of geographic Balfour Township, and reaches its mouth at the Vermilion River. The Vermilion River flows via the Spanish River to Lake Huron.

== Name origin ==
Onaping may be a corruption of the Anishinaabemowin word onamaning. Onaman means red ochre and the locative suffix "ing" transforms the word into "place of the red ochre". The Onaping River is located on the ridge of the Sudbury basin, an area rich in iron-bearing minerals.

== Tributaries ==
- Mosquito Creek (left)
- Windy Creek (right)
- Carhess Creek (right)
- Wanitanga Creek (left)
- Leinster Creek (right)
- Shingwak Creek (left)
- Michaud River (left)
- Friday Creek (left)
- Rhodes Creek (left)

== See also ==
- List of rivers of Ontario

== Sources ==
- Map 6 (PDF) (Map). 1 : 700,000. Official road map of Ontario. Ministry of Transportation of Ontario. 2014.
- Restructured municipalities - Ontario map #4 (Map). Restructuring Maps of Ontario. Ontario Ministry of Municipal Affairs and Housing. 2006. Archived from the original on 2014-04-10.
