= Brule Lake (Frontenac County) =

- Location in Southern Ontario
- Location: Frontenac County, Ontario
- Coordinates: 45°03′03″N 77°02′54″W
- Type: Lake
- Part of: Saint Lawrence River drainage basin
- Primary outflows: Unnamed creek
- Basin countries: Canada
- Max. length: 6.4 kilometres (4.0 mi)
- Max. width: 2.3 kilometres (1.4 mi)
- Surface elevation: 55 metres (180 ft)

Brule Lake is a lake in North Frontenac, Frontenac County in Eastern Ontario, Canada, located near the community of Plevna. It is part of the Saint Lawrence River drainage basin, and is in geographic Miller Township.

Brule Lake was formerly known on older maps as Wensley Lake is in the Land of Lakes region. It has two named bays: White Bay at the west, and Laundry Bay at the east. There is also one named island, Kelso Island in White Bay. The lake is 6.4 kilometres (4.0 mi) long and 2.3 kilometres (1.4 mi) wide, with depths of 55 metres (180 ft).

Brule Lake has six unnamed inflows: one at the east to Laundry Bay; one at the southeast; two at the west to White Bay; and two at the north. The primary outflow is an unnamed creek at the northeast which heads in the direction of Fortune Lake, which flows via Skead Creek, Mackie Creek, Centennial Lake, the Madawaska River and the Ottawa River to the Saint Lawrence River.

== See also ==
- List of lakes in Ontario
