= Ontario Highway 801 =

Former Ontario provincial highway

Highway 801
- Auden Road; Road 801
- A map of Highway 801, highlighted in red

Route information
- Maintained by Ministry of Transportation of Ontario
- Length: 14.0 km (8.7 mi)
- Existed: October 24, 1963–September 1, 2010

Major junctions
- South end: Highway 11 / TCH west of Jellicoe
- North end: Namewaminikan River bridge

Location
- Country: Canada
- Province: Ontario
- Districts: Thunder Bay

Highway system
- Ontario provincial highways; Current; Former; 400-series
← Highway 800	→ Highway 802

Tertiary Highway 801, now known as Road 801 or Auden Road, was a provincially maintained highway in the Canadian province of Ontario. The 14.0 kilometres (8.7 mi) tertiary highway was located entirely in Greenstone, in south central Thunder Bay District. It was established in 1963 as a forest resource access road to the Sturgeon River Mine. In 2010, jurisdiction over the highway was transferred to the Ministry of Natural Resources.

== Route description ==
Highway 801 began at Highway 11, part of the Trans-Canada Highway, at Nezah, between the towns of Jellicoe to the east and Beardmore to the west. The entirely gravel-surfaced road travelled 14.0 kilometres (8.7 mi) north through dense boreal forest to the Namewaminikan River. From there, the locally maintained Auden Road continued north to the Auden flag stop serviced by VIA Rails Canadian line. Highway 801 was located within the former townships of Walter and Elmhirst. There are no communities along the former highway, with Jellicoe being the closest settlement, 10 kilometres (6 mi) to the east. In 2008, the final year for which traffic data is available, an average of 90 vehicles travelled along the highway each day.

== History ==
Highway 801 was first assumed as a provincial highway on October 24, 1963, as a forest resource access road to connect Highway 11 with the Sturgeon River Mine. The route remained unchanged throughout its existence. On September 1, 2010, jurisdiction over the highway was transferred to the Ministry of Natural Resources. Today the roadway is signed as Road 801.

== Major intersections ==
The following table lists the major junctions along Highway 801, as noted by the Ministry of Transportation of Ontario. The entire route is located in Thunder Bay District.

Location	km	mi	Destinations	Notes
Greenstone	0.0	0.0	Highway 11 – Beardmore, Jellicoe	Trans-Canada Highway
Unorganized Thunder Bay District	14.0	8.7	Namewaminikan River	Highway ends at river crossing
1.000 mi = 1.609 km; 1.000 km = 0.621 mi
