= Tomiko, Ontario =

Tomiko
- Dispersed Rural Community
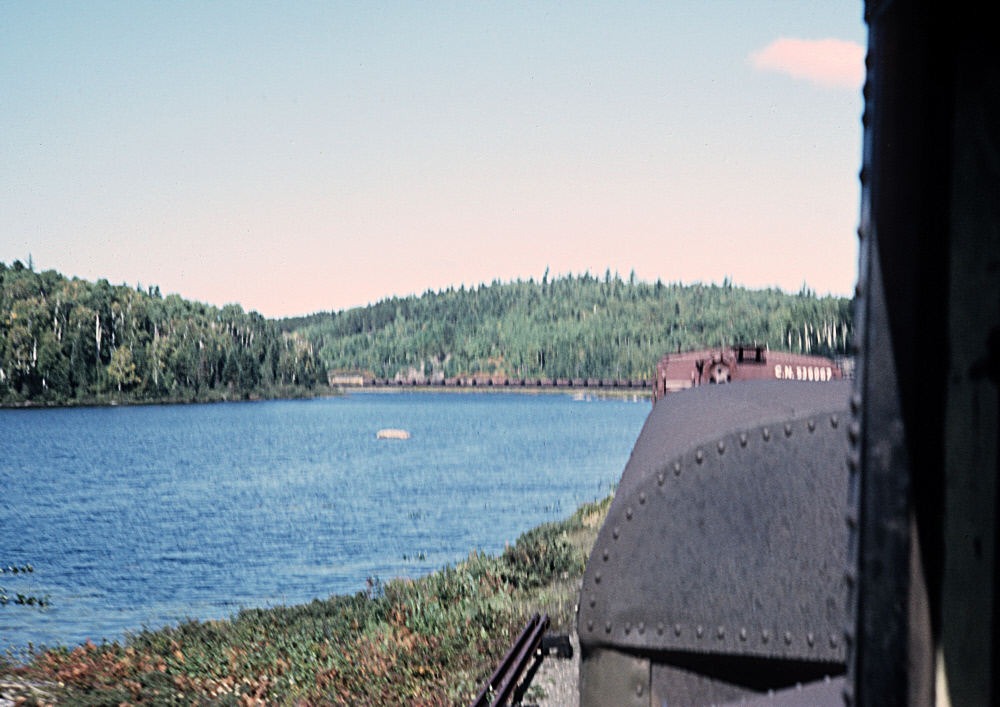
- View from Ontario Northland Railway near Tomiko, Ontario (1965)

- Location in Ontario
- Coordinates: 46°34′06″N 79°24′40″W
- Country: Canada
- Province: Ontario
- District: Nipissing
- Geographic Township: Stewart Township
- Elevation: 353 m (1,158 ft)
- Time zone: UTC-5 (Eastern Time Zone)
  - Summer (DST): UTC-4 (Eastern Time Zone)

Tomiko is a dispersed rural community and unincorporated place in geographic Stewart Township, Nipissing District in Northeastern Ontario, Canada. It was created during the construction of the Ontario Northland Railway in the early 20th century. Tomiko is located between the dispersed rural communities of Jocko to the north and Mulock to the south, and has two passing sidings.

Ferguson Lake lies about 500 metres (1,600 ft) southeast of the community.
