= Jocko, Ontario =

Jocko
- Dispersed Rural Community
- Location in Ontario
- Coordinates: 46°37′41″N 79°25′55″W
- Country: Canada
- Province: Ontario
- District: Nipissing
- Geographic Township: Osborne
- Elevation: 319 m (1,047 ft)
- Time zone: UTC-5 (Eastern Time Zone)
  - Summer (DST): UTC-4 (Eastern Time Zone)

Jocko is a dispersed rural community and unincorporated place in geographic Osborne Township in the Unorganized North Part of Nipissing District in Northeastern Ontario, Canada. It was created during the construction of the Ontario Northland Railway in the early 20th century. Jocko is located on the railway line between the railway point of Osborne to the north and the dispersed rural community of Tomiko to the south.

Jocko is at the upstream (south) end of Jocko Lake, the source of the Jocko River.
