= Sivuqaq (walrus) =

Captive walrus at Six Flags Discovery Kingdom

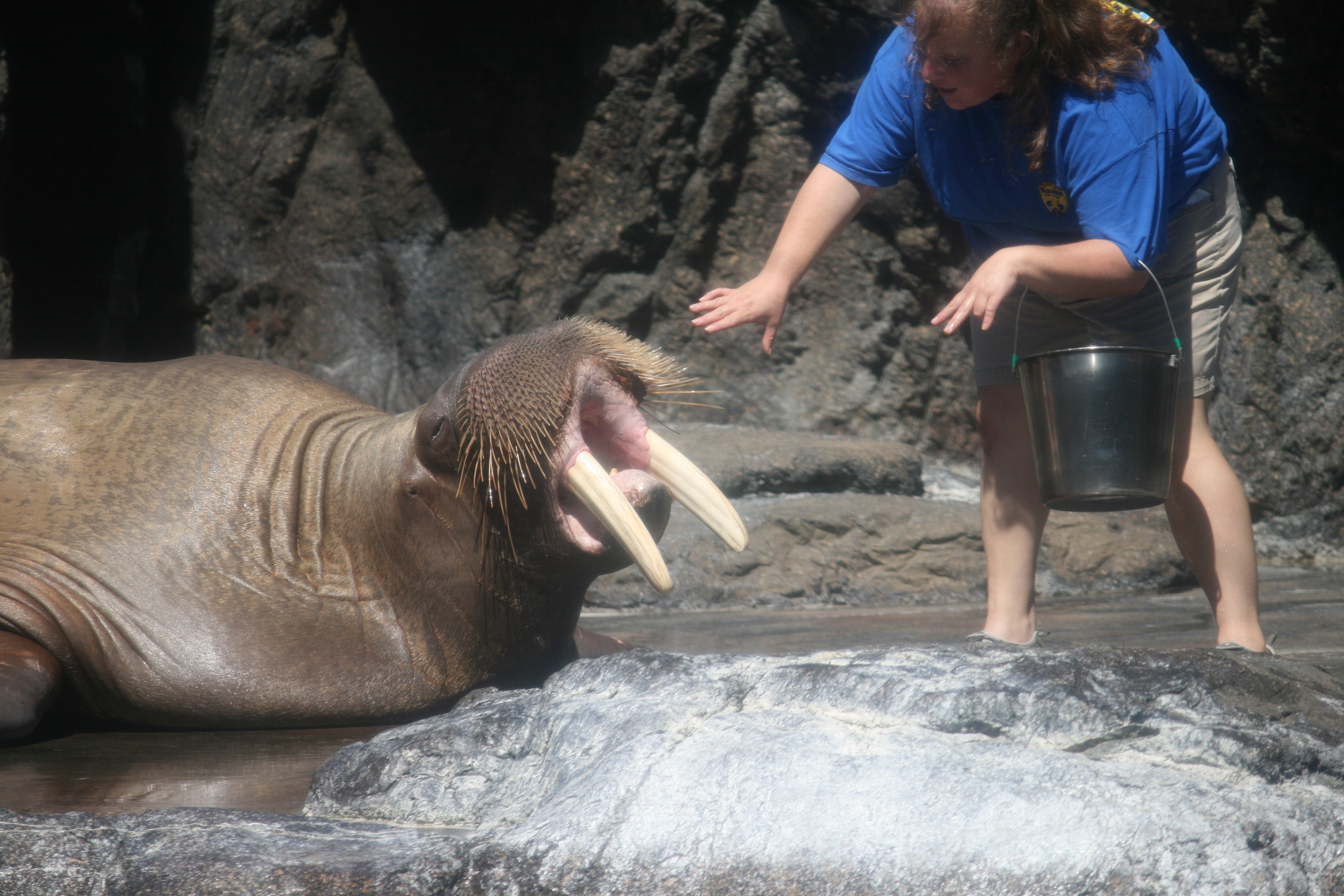
- Sivuqaq at Vallejo
- Other name: Jocko
- Species: Walrus
- Sex: Male
- Born: 1994 near Gambell, Alaska
- Died: June 28, 2015; Six Flags Discovery Kingdom
- Occupation: Zoo attraction
- Owner: Six Flags Discovery Kingdom
- Weight: 2,200 lb (998 kg)

Sivuqaq, also known as Jocko, was a Pacific walrus at the Six Flags Discovery Kingdom in Vallejo, California. He was the subject of several television and radio programmes, some of which focused on the steps his keepers took to encourage him to mate successfully. He was one of a number of walrus calves brought to Vallejo in 1994; the three others were the females Qiluk, Uquq, and Siku. They were orphaned as the result of hunting near the city of Gambell, Alaska. Gambell's name in Yupik, "Sivuqaq", inspired his name. He died in 2015.

== Research ==
Sivuqaq was the subject of research on the vocalisation, reproductive habits, and cognition of walruses.

== Acting career ==
Sivuqaq appeared as Jocko in the 2004 film 50 First Dates.
