= Little Jocko River =

- Location of the mouth of the Little Jocko River in Ontario

Location
- Country: Canada
- Province: Ontario
- Region: Northeastern Ontario
- District: Nipissing

Physical characteristics
- Source: Unnamed lake
  - location: Jocko Township
  - coordinates: 46°33′17″N 79°12′38″W
  - elevation: 366 m (1,201 ft)
- Mouth: Jocko River
  - location: Eddy Township
  - coordinates: 46°34′57″N 79°03′57″W
  - elevation: 213 m (699 ft)

Basin features
- River system: Saint Lawrence River drainage basin

The Little Jocko River is a river in Nipissing District in Northeastern Ontario, Canada. It is in the Saint Lawrence River drainage basin, is a right tributary of the Jocko River, and lies entirely within Jocko Rivers Provincial Park.

The Little Jocko River begins in geographic Jocko Township at an unnamed lake and heads north, then turns south southeast, and flows under Ontario Highway 63, where there is a small picnic area. It passes into geographic Eddy Township, turns north, and reaches its mouth at the Jocko River. The Jocko River flows via the Ottawa River to the Saint Lawrence River.

== See also ==
- List of rivers of Ontario
