= Jocko River (Montana) =

Location
- Country: Sanders and Lake County, Montana

Physical characteristics
- Source
  - location: Upper Jocko Lake
  - coordinates: 47°11′19.4″N 113°42′07.2″W
- 2nd source
  - location: North Jocko Peak
  - coordinates: 47°16′22.9″N 113°45′14.2″W
- 3rd source
  - coordinates: 47°09′01.5″N 113°51′44.4″W
- Mouth
  - coordinates: 47°19′17″N 114°18′15″W
  - elevation: 2,503 feet (763 m)
- Basin size: 380 mi^{2} (980 km^{2})
- Discharge
  - average: 234 cu ft/s (6.6 m^{3}/s)

Basin features
- River system: Columbia River

The Jocko River (Salish: nisisutetkʷ ntx̣ʷe) is a roughly 40-mile (64 km) tributary of the Flathead River in western Montana in the United States. It rises in the foothills of the Rocky Mountains and flows west into the Flathead at Dixon. The elevation is 2,503 feet (763 m) where it joins the Flathead. It is also known as Jacques Fork, Jim's Fork, Prune River or Wild Horse Creek. The river breaks into three forks, the North, Middle and South Forks, of which the Middle Fork is considered the main stem.

It is named after Jacques (Jocko) Raphael Finlay (1768-1828), an early Metis fur trader, scout, and explorer. It is located on the Flathead Indian Reservation and forms the south border of the CSKT Bison Range.

The Jocko Valley was the site of flooding in June 2011, when the Jocko River overflowed its banks as a result of a "200% of average" snowpack combined with heavy precipitation.

== List of crossings ==
- Polson Branch Northern Pacific Railway (source 47°19'04.0"N 114°18'08.1"W)
- Paradise To Ravalli Northern Pacific Railway (source 47°18'47.8"N 114°17'57.0"W)
- Montana Hwy 212 (source 47°18'43.3"N 114°17'48.0"W)
- Paradise To Ravalli Northern Pacific Railway(source 47°18'18.2"N 114°16'57.9"W)
- Montana Highway 200 (source 47°16'42.1"N 114°11'19.0"W)
- Paradise To Ravalli Northern Pacific Railway (source 47°16'40.8"N 114°11'18.5"W)
- N Valley Creek Rd (source 47°14'49.5"N 114°10'14.7"W)
- S Valley Creek Rd (source 47°13'00.7"N 114°08'31.7"W)
- Ravalli To Missoula Northern Pacific Railway (source 47°10'48.4"N 114°06'05.9"W)
- U.S. Route 93 (source 47°10'39.3"N 114°05'58.9"W)
- Theresa Adams Ln (source 47°09'29.1"N 114°01'30.6"W)
- Jocko Canyon Rd (source 47°09'20.7"N 113°59'34.2"W)
- Jocko Canyon Canal Rd (source 47°09'32.8"N 113°59'19.1"W)
- Lemti Ln (source 47°09'47.1"N 113°58'35.7"W)
- Jocko Canyon Rd (source 47°10'57.5"N 113°56'55.8"W)
- Pistol Creek Rd (source 47°11'46.4"N 113°56'04.6"W)
- Jocko Canyon Rd x3 (source 47°12'03.3"N 113°55'04.8"W)(source 47°11'42.6"N 113°51'10.8"W)

(source 47°11'56.3"N 113°50'32.9"W)

== See also ==
- List of rivers of Montana
- Montana Stream Access Law
- Columbia River
