= Ontario Highway 63 =

Ontario provincial highway

Highway 63

Route information
- Maintained by the Ministry of Transportation
- Length: 63.5 km (39.5 mi)
- Existed: August 25, 1937–present

Major junctions
- South end: Highway 11 / Highway 17 in North Bay
- Highway 533 near Eldee
- North end: R-101 at the Quebec boundary

Location
- Country: Canada
- Province: Ontario

Highway system
- Ontario provincial highways; Current; Former; 400-series
← Highway 62	→ Highway 64

King's Highway 63, commonly referred to as Highway 63, is a provincially maintained highway in the Canadian province of Ontario. The 63.5-kilometre (39.5 mi) route travels from Highway 11 and Highway 17 (the Trans-Canada Highway) in North Bay northeast to the Ontario-Quebec provincial boundary, where it continues as Route 101 into Témiscaming.

The route was assumed in 1937, following the merger of the Department of Northern Development (DND) into the Department of Highways (DHO), predecessor to the modern Ministry of Transportation of Ontario (MTO). It travelled from what was then Highway 11 (Main Street) in downtown North Bay northeast to its present terminus. The highway follows the same route today, with the exception of the westernmost 1.9 kilometres (1.2 mi), which were transferred to the City of North Bay in 1998.

== Route description ==
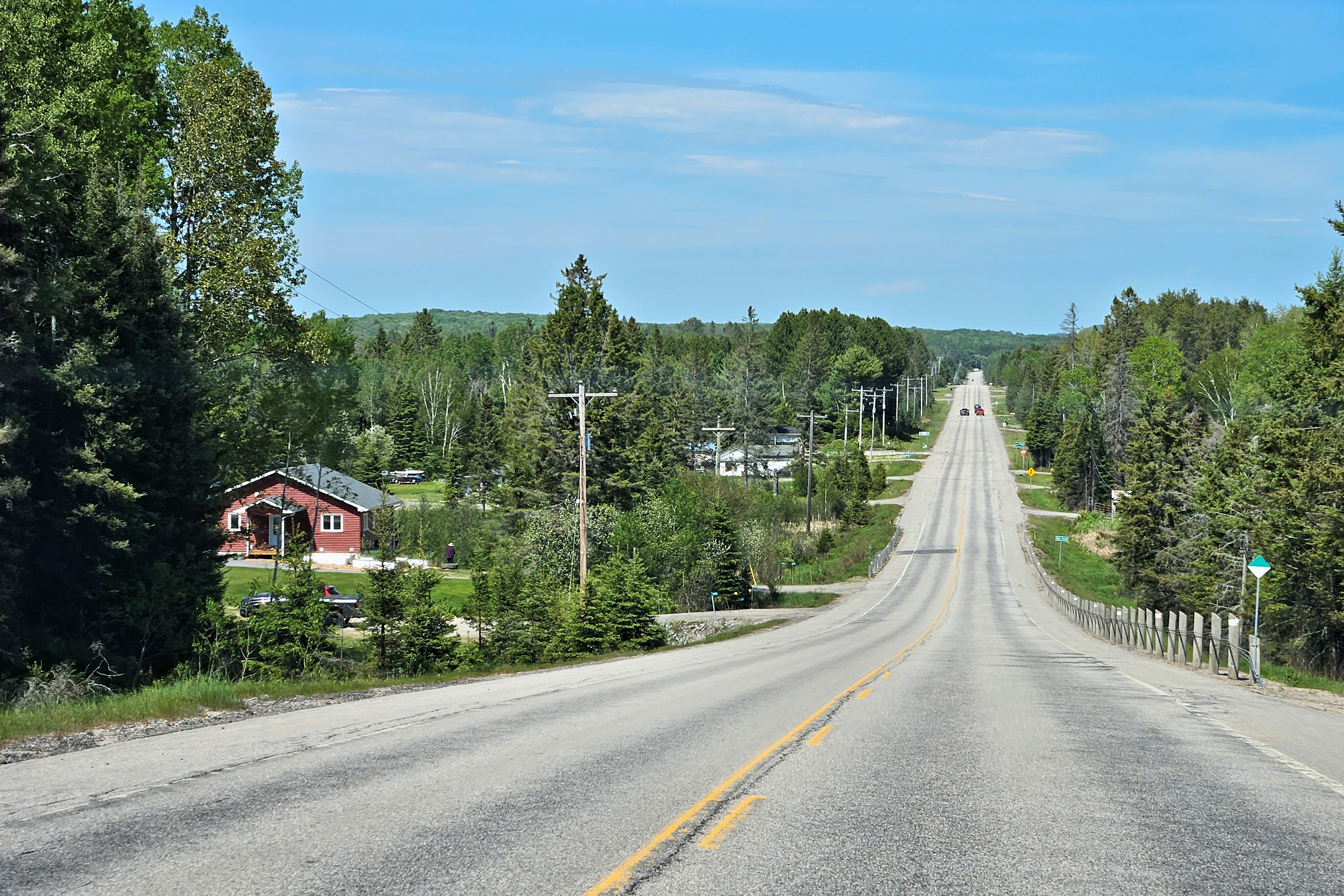
Highway 63 at Redbridge

Highway 63 begins at Highway 11 and Highway 17 (the Trans-Canada Highway) in North Bay and travels 63.5 kilometres (39.5 mi) northeast to the Ontario–Quebec provincial boundary, where Route 101 continues into Témiscaming. It travels through the communities of Feronia, Redbridge, Balsam Creek, Eldee and Thorne. Prior to 1998, the route included a 1.9-kilometre (1.2 mi) section of Cassells Street extending into downtown North Bay. Highway 63 is 63.5 kilometres (39.5 mi) long, situated entirely within Nipissing District.

Beginning in North Bay near Lake Nipissing, the source of the French River which flows down to Georgian Bay, Highway 63 travels east through suburbs. It exits the city and travels along the northern shores of Trout Lake, which serves as the headwaters of the Mattawa River, which flows into the Ottawa River and eventually the St. Lawrence River. The portion of Highway 63 west of Trout Lake travels between these water systems.

The highway curves northeast to pass through the communities of Feronia and later Redbridge and Balsam Creek, after which it enters thick wilderness dominated by the Canadian Shield and Boreal Forest, with few residences or services outside of communities. It meanders northward, meeting the northern end of Highway 533, which travels south to Mattawa, approximately two-thirds of the distance between North Bay and the Quebec border. For the remainder of the highway, the route passes through isolated forests, travelling north, then curving east towards the Ottawa River. It passes through the community of Eldee before turning north alongside the river, following it up through Thorne. North of Thorne, the highway turns east and crosses the river into Quebec, becoming Route 101 and entering Témiscaming.

== History ==
On August 25, 1937, the North Bay – Témiscaming Road was assumed by the DHO as Highway 63, connecting Highway 11 (Main Street) in downtown North Bay with the Ontario–Quebec border at Témiscaming. The road existed prior to this point as a northern development road. However, on April 1, 1937, the DND merged into the DHO. As a result, numerous highways were assumed in the northern regions of Ontario in mid-1937. The highway remained unchanged for over 60 years, until January 1, 1998, when the Connecting Link agreement through North Bay from Main Street to Highway 11 / Highway 17 - the North Bay Bypass - was rescinded. As a result, Highway 63 was shortened by 1.9 kilometres (1.2 mi).

== Major intersections ==
The following table lists the major junctions along Highway 63, as noted by the Ministry of Transportation of Ontario. The entire route is located in Nipissing District.

Location	km	mi	Destinations	Notes
North Bay	−1.9	−1.2	Main Street	Former Highway 63 southern terminus; formerly Highway 11B / Highway 17B
North Bay	0.0	0.0	Highway 11 / Highway 17 (North Bay Bypass) / TCH	Highway 63 southern terminus; beginning of North Bay Connecting Link agreement.
North Bay	3.5	2.2	Rees Street	End of North Bay Connecting Link agreement; access to North Bay Water Aerodrome
Redbridge	17.7	11.0	Songis Road	North Bay city limits
	39.2	24.4	Highway 533 south – Mattawa	
Thorne	62.2	38.6	Birch Street	
	63.5	39.5	Ottawa River Bridge	
	63.5	39.5	R-101 north – Témiscaming, Rouyn-Noranda	Continuation into Quebec
1.000 mi = 1.609 km; 1.000 km = 0.621 mi: Closed/former; Route transition
