= Namewaminikan River =

- Location of the river mouth in Ontario

Location
- Country: Canada
- State: Ontario
- Region: Northwestern Ontario
- District: Thunder Bay

Physical characteristics
- Source: Unnamed lake
  - coordinates: 49°17′13″N 87°57′36″W
  - elevation: 450 m (1,480 ft)
- Mouth: Lake Nipigon
  - coordinates: 49°39′48″N 88°05′39″W
  - elevation: 260 m (850 ft)

Basin features
- River system: Great Lakes Basin
- Tributaries
  - left: Foxear Creek
  - right: Roslyn River

The Namewaminikan River is a river in Thunder Bay District in northwestern Ontario, Canada. It is in the Great Lakes Basin and is a tributary of Lake Nipigon.

== Course ==
The river begins at an unnamed lake in Unorganized Thunder Bay, just 12 kilometres (7.5 mi) east of Cove Inlet at the southeast of its eventual mouth, Lake Nipigon. It travels northeast through Georgia Lake, Barbara Lake, Parks Lake and Trapnarrows Lake to Gathering Lake, where it takes in the right tributaries Roslyn River and Margret Creek. It then heads north, passes into the municipality of Greenstone, and flows under Ontario Highway 11, forming at this point part of the Trans-Canada Highway, and reaches Turkey Lake, where it takes in the right tributary Wildgoose Creek. The river heads west, through Partridge Lake and over the Kinghorn Falls, Chute Falls and Twin Falls (49°44′31″N 87°53′31″W), takes in the left tributaries Foxear Creek and Corrigan Creek, heads through the Long Rapids (49°42′44″N 87°58′8″W), and reaches its mouth at Lake Nipigon. Lake Nipigon flows via the Nipigon River to Lake Superior.

== Economy ==
Namewaminikan Hydro, a joint venture of three First Nations, the Animbiigoo Zaagi'igan Anishinaabek First Nation, the Biinjitiwaabik Zaaging Anishinaabek First Nation, and the Bingwi Neyaashi Anishinaabek First Nation, is developing two sites at Long Rapids and Twin Falls as run-of-the-river hydroelectric generating stations with a combined output of 10 MW. The project was to have been completed by December 2015.

== Tributaries ==
- Corrigan Creek (left)
- Foxear Creek (left)
- Lapierre Creek (right)
- Legault Creek (left)
- Wildgoose Creek (right)
- South Beatty Creek (right)
- Margret Creek (right)
- Roslyn River (right)

== Sources ==
- Map 14 (PDF) (Map). 1 : 1,600,000. Official road map of Ontario. Ministry of Transportation of Ontario. 2014.
- Restructured municipalities - Ontario map #2 (Map). Restructuring Maps of Ontario. Ontario Ministry of Municipal Affairs and Housing. 2006. Archived from the original on 2014-04-10.
