= Jocko River (Ontario) =

- Location of the mouth of the Jocko River in Ontario

Location
- Country: Canada
- Province: Ontario
- Region: Northeastern Ontario
- District: Nipissing

Physical characteristics
- Source: Jocko Lake
  - location: Osborne Township
  - coordinates: 46°39′33″N 79°27′13″W
  - elevation: 308 m (1,010 ft)
- Mouth: Ottawa River
  - location: Eddy Township
  - coordinates: 46°33′48″N 79°00′08″W
  - elevation: 180 m (590 ft)

Basin features
- Progression: Ottawa River→ St. Lawrence River→ Gulf of St. Lawrence
- River system: Ottawa River drainage basin
- Tributaries
  - right: Little Jocko River

The Jocko River is a river in Nipissing District in Northeastern Ontario, Canada. It is in the Saint Lawrence River drainage basin, is a right tributary of the Ottawa River, and lies entirely within Jocko Rivers Provincial Park.

== Course ==
The Jocko River begins at Jocko Lake in geographic Osborne Township; the dispersed rural community of Jocko, on the Ontario Northland Railway, is at the head of the lake. The river heads northeast, then turns southeast, a course it thereafter follows all the way to its mouth. The Jocko River passes through geographic Garrow Township and geographic Clarkson Township before entering geographic Jocko Township, where it flows under Ontario Highway 63. It passes into geographic Eddy Township, takes in the right tributary Little Jocko River, and reaches its mouth at the Ottawa River.

== Tributaries ==
- Little Jocko River (right)
- Hanson Creek (right)
- outflow from Little Sucker Lake, which itself takes in Sucker Creek
- Black Duck Creek (left)

== See also ==
- List of rivers of Ontario
