= Unorganized North Nipissing District =

- Unorganized area
- Nipissing, Unorganized, North Part
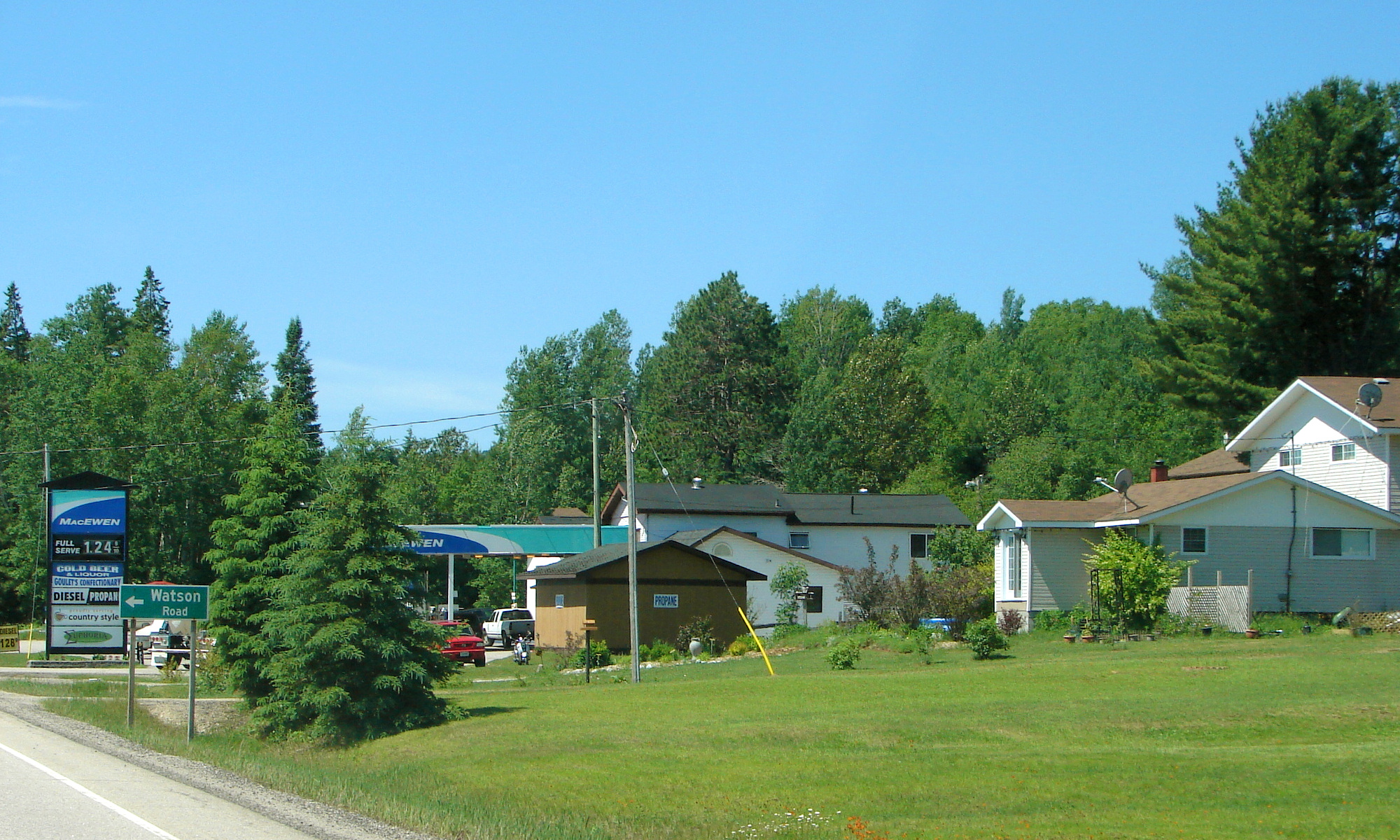
- Eldee

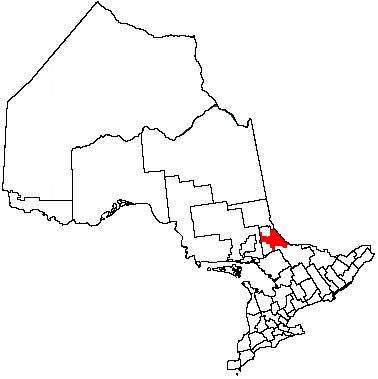
- Coordinates: 46°40′N 79°30′W
- Country: Canada
- Province: Ontario
- District: Nipissing

Government
  - Fed. riding: Nipissing—Timiskaming
  - Prov. riding: Timiskaming—Cochrane, Nipissing

Area
  - Land: 3,721.20 km^{2} (1,436.76 sq mi)

Population (2021)
  - Total: 1,591
  - Density: 0.4/km^{2} (1.0/sq mi)
- Time zone: UTC-5 (EST)
  - Summer (DST): UTC-4 (EDT)
- Area code: 705

Unorganized North Nipissing District is an unorganized area in northeastern Ontario, Canada. It includes the unincorporated areas in northern Nipissing District, north of the Mattawa River.

The unorganized area is gradually being reduced in size. In 1967, a portion was transferred to Unorganized Timiskaming, and between 1996 and 2001, its area shrank from 7,216.66 square kilometres (2,786.37 sq mi) to 3,630.64 square kilometres (1,401.80 sq mi), because of annexation by surrounding incorporated towns and townships.

== Geography ==
=== Communities ===
- Balsam Creek
- Eldee
- Jocko
- Mulock
- Redbridge
- Songis
- Thorne
- Tomiko
- Tilden Lake

=== Geographic townships ===
- La Salle Township
- Mulock Township
- Osborne Township
- Stewart Township
- Gladman Township

== Demographics ==
Canada census – Nipissing, Unorganized, North Part community profile

	2021	2016	2011
Population	1,591 (-10.8% from 2016)	1784 (-3.7% from 2011)	1853 (3.1% from 2006)
Land area	3,721.20 km^{2} (1,436.76 sq mi)	3,755.97 km^{2} (1,450.19 sq mi)	3,755.97 km^{2} (1,450.19 sq mi)
Population density	0.4/km^{2} (1.0/sq mi)	0.5/km^{2} (1.3/sq mi)	0.5/km^{2} (1.3/sq mi)
Median age	54.8 (M: 54.8, F: 54.4)	50.9 (M: 51.5, F: 50.1)
Private dwellings	955 (total) 729 (occupied)	996 (total) 794 (occupied)	1013 (total)
Median household income	$71,500	$61,054

References: 2021 2016 2011

Historical census populations – Nipissing, Unorganized, North Part

Year	Pop.	±%
1976	4,242	—
1981	3,945	−7.0%
1986	3,674	−6.9%
1991	3,911	+6.5%
1996	4,149	+6.1%

Year	Pop.	±%
2001	1,856	−55.3%
2006	1,798	−3.1%
2011	1,853	+3.1%
2016	1,784	−3.7%
2021	1,591	−10.8%

Population counts are not adjusted for boundary changes.
Source: Statistics Canada

Mother tongue (according to the 2021 Canadian census):

- English as first language: 81.5%
- French as first language: 13.5%
- English and French as first languages: 2.5%
- Other as first language: 1.6%

== See also ==
- List of townships in Ontario
