= DeGrazia =

DeGrazia or De Grazia is a surname. Notable people with the surname include:

- Alfred de Grazia (1919–2014), American political scientist and author
- Américo de Grazia (born 1959), Venezuelan politician and National Assembly deputy
- David DeGrazia (born 1962), American moral philosopher
- Domingo DeGrazia, American politician
- Don De Grazia, professor
- Edward de Grazia (1927–2013), American lawyer, writer and activist
- Ettore DeGrazia (1909–1982), American painter, sculptor, composer, actor, director, designer, architect, jeweler, and lithographer
- Jazmín De Grazia (1984–2012), Argentine model and television presenter
- Lorenzo De Grazia (born 1995), Italian footballer
- Margreta de Grazia (born 1946), Shakespeare scholar
- Sebastian de Grazia (1917–2000), American author
- Victor deGrazia (1929–2005), American politician
- Victoria de Grazia, American professor and historian
