= Haute-Nendaz =

Village in Valais, Switzerland

Coordinates: 46°11′12″N 7°17′56″E

Nendaz
- Municipality
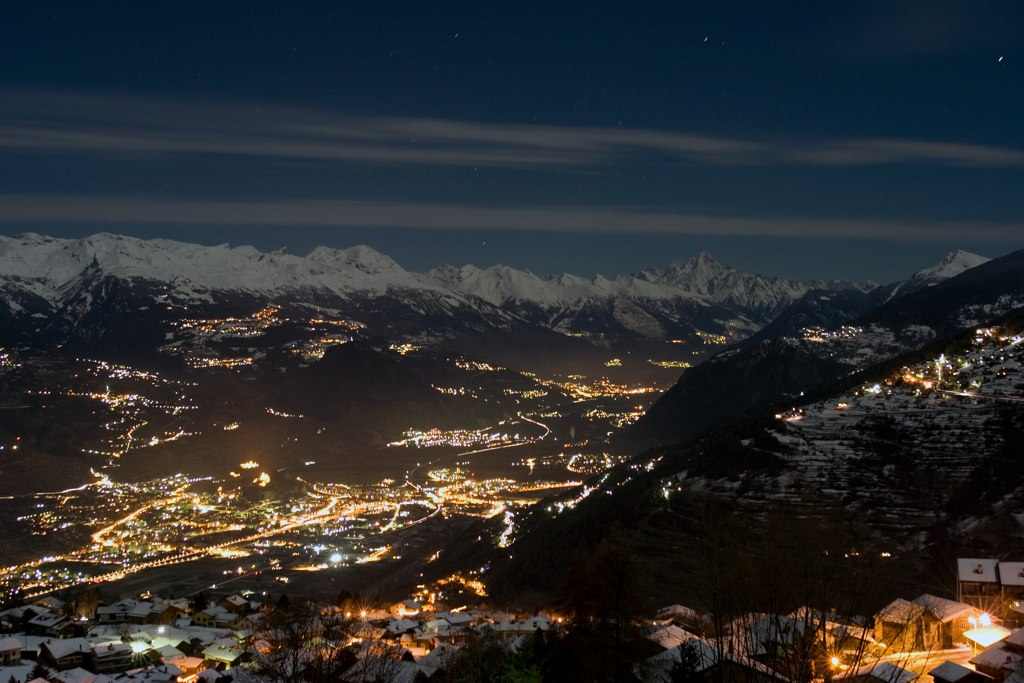
- Valais from Nendaz in January 2010
- Location of Nendaz
- Location within Switzerland Location within Canton of Valais
- Country: Switzerland
- Canton: Valais
- District: Conthey

Government
  - Mayor: Francis Dumas
- Time zone: UTC+01:00 (CET)
  - Summer (DST): UTC+02:00 (CEST)
- Postal code: 1997 (Haute-Nendaz)
- ISO 3166 code: CH-VS
- Surrounded by: Ardon, Bagnes, Chamoson, Conthey, Hérémence, Isérables, Les Agettes, Riddes, Salins, Sion, Vétroz, Vex, Veysonnaz
- Website: www.nendaz.org

Haute-Nendaz is a village in the municipality of Nendaz, Canton Valais, Switzerland. It is situated on plateau at an altitude between 1300m and 1500m. In winter, it forms part of the 4 Vallées ski resort and is one of the most extensive ski areas in Europe, with a ski area of over 400 km.

It is located close to Sion, the capital of Valais.

== History ==
Earliest documents date Nendaz back to 985. Until the 19th century, the Nendaz community was largely based on agriculture. When traces of gold were found, the region went through a brief gold rush. The main source of mineral wealth remains carbon extracted from Aproz.

When Switzerland's tourism industry blossomed again after World War II, Nendaz started their first cablecart lift and the start of Télénendaz. Nendaz went into rapid expansion afterwards. Large chalets were rapidly being built on previously forested areas, and more ski resorts were added, namely in Siviez (then named Super-Nendaz).

By the 1970s, the resort was already struggling to cope with large queues at the ticket offices, and the mountain cablecars were barely able to manage the crowds during the winter holidays. Nowadays, renovations have been made with the most recent addition a new cable car linking Siviez and Plan du Fou (2430m, ski area) together.

It is, along with Verbier, Veysonnaz, Thyon and La Tzoumaz, part of 4 Vallées, Switzerland's largest ski area, which together form over 400 km of ski slopes. In the summer there are various mountain bike (VTT) trails.

== Geography ==
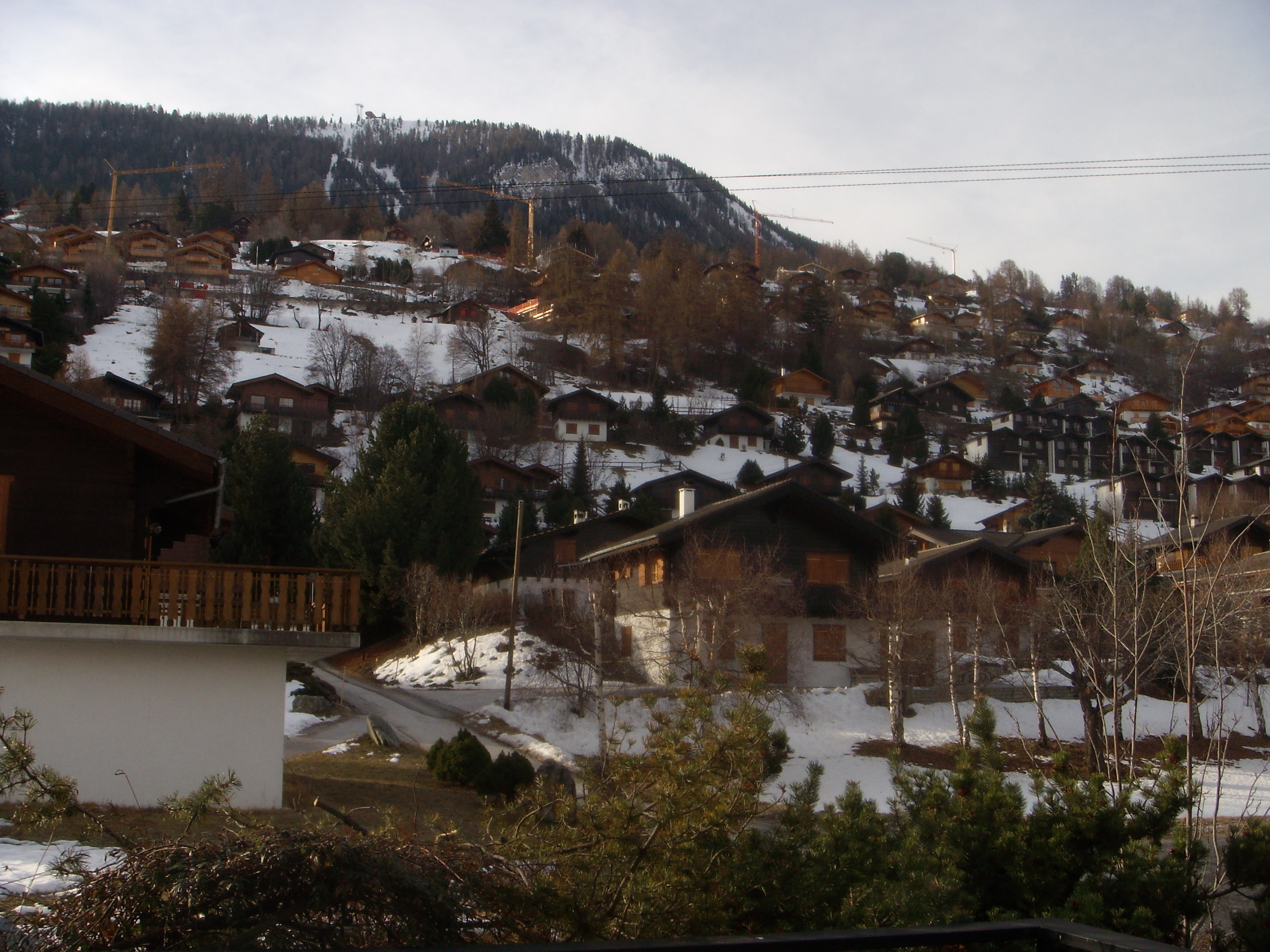
Haute Nendaz village, Tracouet cable car can be seen

For the whole of Nendaz, along with its villages and hamlets, see Nendaz.

There are several parts of Haute-Nendaz, these consist of:

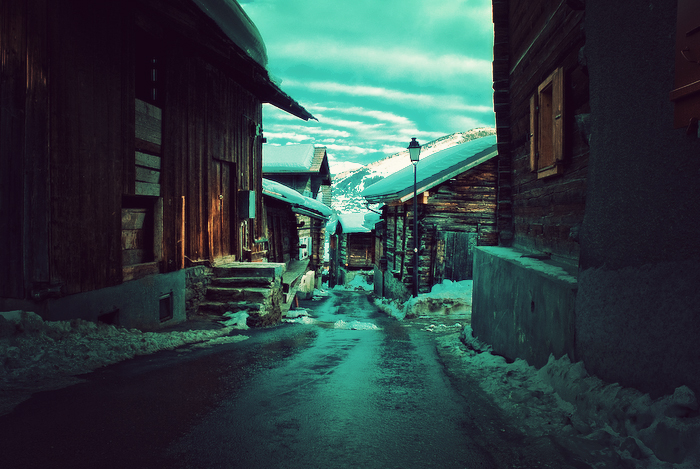
Houses in Nendaz municipality

- Vieux Village (old town): the old village of Nendaz, made up of small, dark wooden chalets
- Les Ecluses: main shopping area, complete with several shops and cafés. It is the centre of attention of the ski resort.
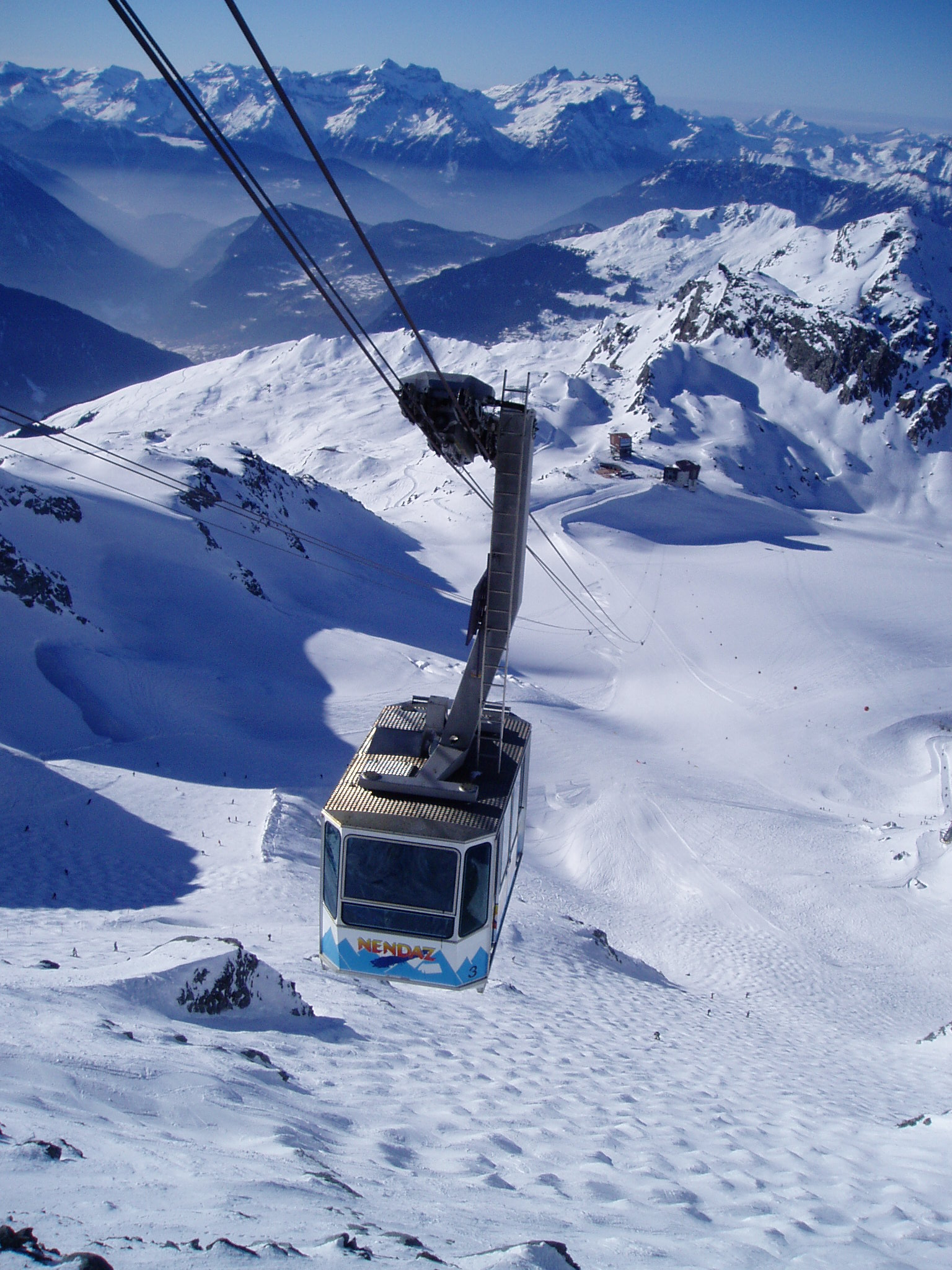
  Mont Fort cable car
- Siviez: here is the starting point of many ski lifts to both Verbier and Veysonnaz, connecting the ski slopes. It consists of three apartment blocks, and several restaurants and small shops. It is around 20 minutes from Nendaz's centre.
- Basse-Nendaz: the lower part of Nendaz, this is home to the council
- Tracouet: another, smaller ski-resort aimed at beginners. It is, however, linked to the larger ski domain of Siviez.

The Nendaz Freeride is a freeriding competition that has been held since 2007.

== Accessibility ==
Nendaz is approximately half an hour from Sion, the capital of the Valais, and two hours from Geneva by car. There are several 'Post-bus' services a day, running between areas in the village. One service links Nendaz with Sion, and stops off at the villages along the way.

From the surrounding ski resorts, it can be reached by cable car/chairlift, with the 4 Vallées ski pass. Otherwise, it can be reached by train (to the Sion train station, there are regular trains from different parts of Switzerland) and then by bus from Sion to Nendaz. It is therefore reachable from nearby airports.

Sion Airport is close to Nendaz, again accessible by bus. However, there is a limited number of passenger flights which go from this airport. Currently, there are only two flights from the airport: Swiss International Air Lines operates a flight to London Heathrow Airport, while Helvetic Airways flies to Palma de Mallorca.
