= Alfred de Grazia =

American political scientist

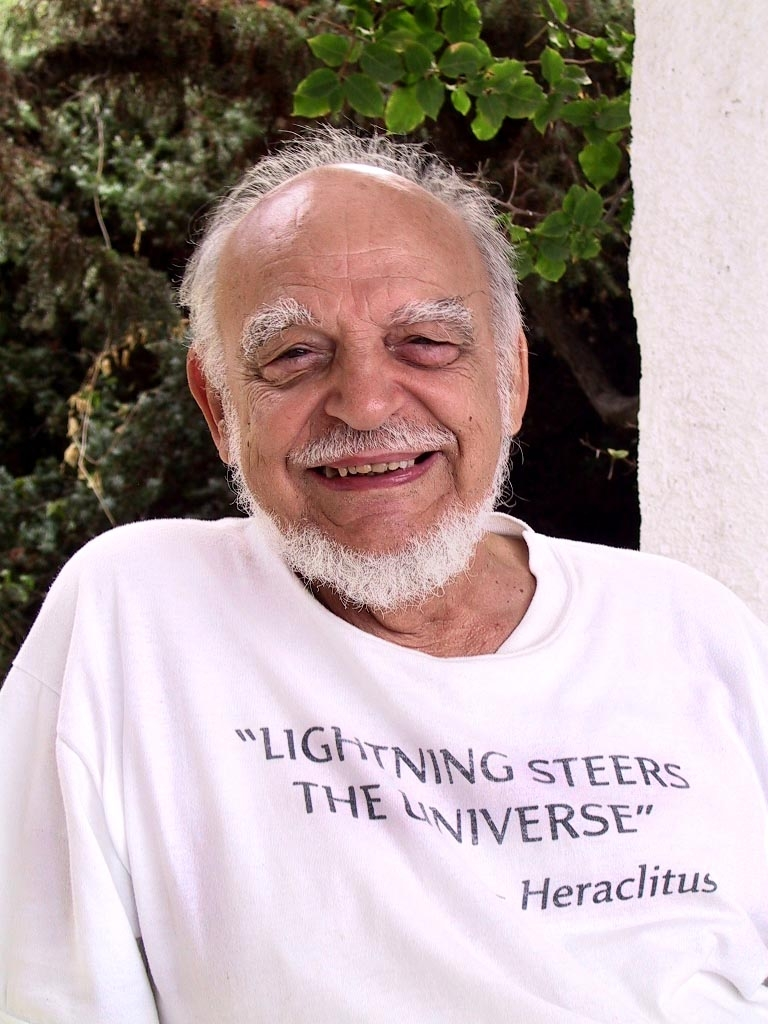
Alfred de Grazia in Naxos, Greece, August 2003

Alfred de Grazia (December 29, 1919 – July 13, 2014), born in Chicago, Illinois, was a political scientist and author. He developed techniques of computer-based social network analysis in the 1950s, developed new ideas about personal digital archives in the 1970s, and defended the catastrophism thesis of Immanuel Velikovsky.

== Origins ==
His father, Joseph Alfred de Grazia, was born in Licodia, province of Catania, in Sicily and was politically active in a troubled period in the history of the island. He emigrated to the United States at the age of twenty, after having hit the mayor of Licodia with his clarinet during a political scuffle. He became a bandmaster, music teacher, in and out of the WPA and a musical union leader in Chicago. In 1916, he married Chicago-born Katherine Lupo Cardinale whose parents had emigrated from Sicily. Her brother was the boxer Charles Kid Lucca, Canadian champion welter-weight champion from 1910 to 1914. They had three more sons, Sebastian de Grazia, winner of the Pulitzer Prize, Edward de Grazia, a prominent first amendment lawyer and co-founder of Cardozo School of Law at Yeshiva University, and Victor deGrazia who was Deputy-Governor of the State of Illinois from 1973 to 1977.

== Education ==
De Grazia attended the University of Chicago, receiving an A.B. there in 1939, attended law school at Columbia University from 1940 to 1941, and in 1948 earned a Ph.D. in political science from the University of Chicago. His thesis was published in 1951 as Public and Republic: Political Representation in America. When reviewed by The New York Times it was called "A thoroughgoing examination of the meaning of representation, the fundamental element in any definition of republic." and August Heckscher in the New York Herald Tribune said it was "A sober scholarly volume, authoritative in its field." Charles E. Merriam, founder of the behavioristic approach in political science, wrote: "All scholars in the field of political science and particularly those in the area of representation are under lasting obligation to the writer of this volume for a learned and helpful treatment of one of the major problems of our times. The book will enrich the literature on this very important subject."

== Military activity ==
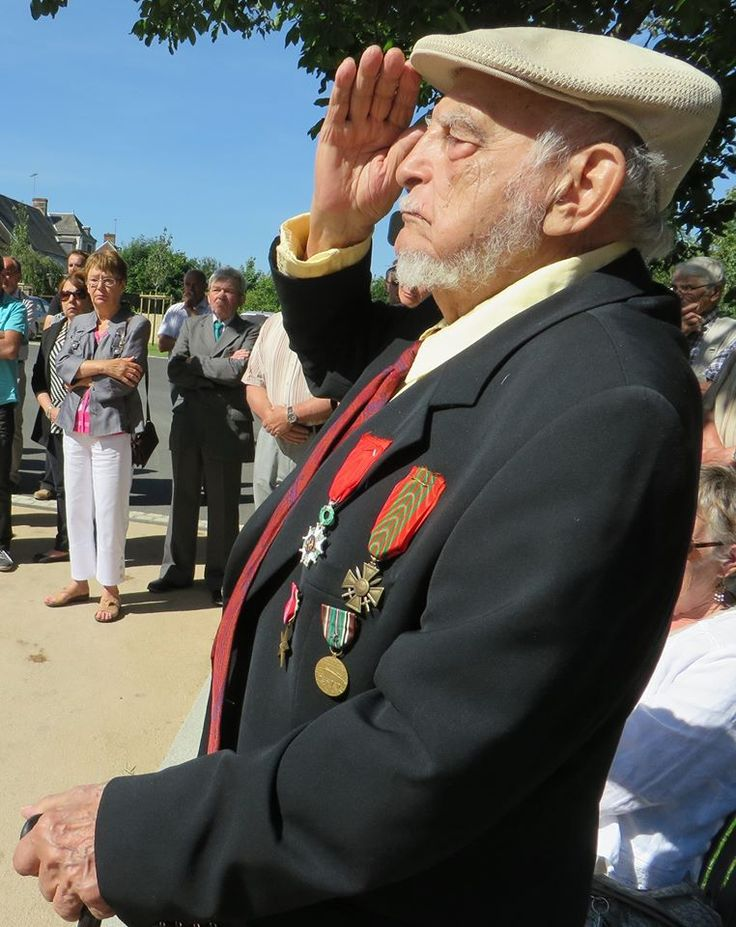
French Medal of Honor Recipient Alfred de Grazia helping celebrate World War II Victory Day in France

In World War II, de Grazia served in the United States Army, rising from private to captain. He specialized in mechanized warfare, intelligence and psychological warfare. He received training in this then new field in Washington D.C. and the newly established Camp Ritchie in Maryland. He served with the 3rd, 5th and 7th Armies and as a liaison officer with the British 8th Army. He took part in six campaigns, from North Africa to Italy (Battle of Monte Cassino) to France and Germany.

De Grazia co-authored a report on psychological warfare for the Supreme Headquarters of the Allied Expeditionary Force. By the end of the war, he was Commanding Officer of the Psychological Warfare Propaganda Team attached to the headquarters of the 7th Army. With his fiancée and later wife, wife Jill deGrazia (née Bertha Oppenheim), he carried on an extensive wartime correspondence of over 2,000 lengthy letters, published on the web under the title "Letters of Love and War". Scott Turow cites the letters as being among the sources for his 2005 novel Ordinary Heroes

De Grazia wrote manuals of psychological warfare for the CIA for the Korean War and organized and investigated psychological operations for the United States Department of Defense during the Vietnam War. His reports on psychological operations, now largely declassified, include Target Analysis and Media in Propaganda to Audiences Abroad (1952), Elites Analysis (1955), as well as Psychological Operations in Vietnam (1968). On October 31, 2014, he was posthumously designated a Distinguished Member of the Regiment of Psychological Operations of the Special Operations Command at Fort Bragg, North Carolina.

For his service in World War II, de Grazia earned the Bronze Star and the EAME Campaign Medal, as well as the Croix de Guerre from France. On December 31, 2013, he was awarded the highest French distinction, being made a Chevalier of the Legion of Honor by decree of President François Hollande. He is also a posthumous recipient of the Robert A. McClure Medal for Exemplary Service in Psychological Operations.

== Academic career ==
De Grazia was an assistant professor of political science at the University of Minnesota from 1948 to 1950 before joining the political science faculty of Brown University as an associate professor. In 1952, he was appointed director of the Committee for Research in the Social Sciences at Stanford University, supported by a Ford Foundation grant. He wrote the textbook The Elements of Political Science in two volumes: Political Behavior and Political Organization (1952). One reviewer of it wrote: "Mr. De Grazia has undertaken to dissect the whole body of political science... He achieves his purpose with unfailing clarity, and his readers will learn from him the range, the goals, and the techniques of the study of politics ..."

In 1955, he failed to receive academic tenure at Stanford after conducting a study of "the origins and present restrictions on the political activities of workers" for a foundation. He left the institution in 1957. From 1959 to 1983, he was a tenured professor of government and social theory at New York University.

In 1957 de Grazia founded PROD: Political Research: Organization and Design, which was described as "probably...the authentic spokesman for the newest currents among the avant-garde of political behavior". It was later renamed The American Behavioral Scientist, an academic journal devoted to the Chicago school of behaviorist sociology. In 1965, he began the Universal Reference System, the first computerized reference system in the social sciences.

De Grazia was a staunch supporter of the power of Congress against the encroachments of the presidency, which he called the "Executive Force" According to Raymond Tatalovich and Steven Schier:

The thesis developed by Alfred de Grazia, coming in 1965 at the high-water mark of the Great Society, is that "the executive of the national government represents and leads the national movement towards a society of order. Congress ... expresses the national urge to liberty. ... Challenging the liberalism of academia, de Grazia doubts that the president can be the tribune of the people, and to call him the "custodian of the public interest or of the national interest is presumptuous," because he is custodian of a public interest, his own, and that may be popular or not, shared by Congress or not. When de Grazia speaks of the "problem of dictatorship," he is citing the growth of the executive apparatus. That is to say, "there is a dictator only because the bureaucratic state must have a face."

The civil service is viewed by de Grazia as "the great engine of the Executive Force," not Congress, because "Congress ... is an institution deeply imbedded in federalism, the free enterprise system, and decentralization of society and politics. In represents basically these values."

...

Concerning both the "ends" and the "means" of government, Alfred de Grazia is a conservative. ... He is not troubled ... about "oligarchy and seniority" wielding disproportionate influence within the legislative process, because Congress operates principally through "the decision system of successive majorities." By that, de Grazia means that different majorities rule in subcommittees, committees, and the floor of each house of Congress.

The American Enterprise Institute published several of his books on the subject, including Congress and the Presidency: their Role in Modern Times, a debate with Arthur M. Schlesinger Jr., who defended the case for a strong presidency.

== Support for Velikovsky ==
de Grazia (right) and Immanuel Velikovsky in 1964

De Grazia became interested in Immanuel Velikovsky's catastrophist theories. Following considerable criticism of Velikovsky's claims by the scientific community, de Grazia dedicated the entire September 1963 issue of American Behavioral Scientist to the issue. He also self-published two books on it, The Velikovsky Affair: The Warfare of Science and Scientism and Cosmic Heretics: A Personal History of Attempts to Establish and Resist Theories of Quantavolution and Catastrophe in the Natural and Human Sciences.

Michael Polanyi stated:

A number of sociologists actually supported the popular view against the scientists. They came out first in The American Behavioral Scientist (September, 1963) and then again in a book (de Grazia 1966), which angrily attacked the whole community of natural scientists for paying no attention to Velikovsky. For my part I believe that the scientists were quite right in refusing to pay serious attention to Velikovsky's writings, and that the sociologists' attack on them was totally unfounded.

In a review of the second book, Henry Bauer suggests that de Grazia's efforts may be responsible for Velikovsky's continuing notability.

In both books de Grazia subscribes to the thesis that, in the words of Henry Bauer, "the affair revealed something seriously rotten in the state of science". The review however suggests that the rejection came about ...

because Velikovsky wanted instant recognition as the authority on science when he had no standing in any science, no qualifications, had not paid his dues through recognized achievements and presented his ideas in the form of a popularly published book rather than through technical articles.

The review further suggests that "de Grazia does not understand how the content of science is generated" and that his "understanding of science as a social activity is ambiguous."

In the second book, de Grazia upholds Velikovsky's most general claim, that geologically recent (in the last 15,000 years) extraterrestrially-caused catastrophes occurred, and had a significant impact on the Earth and its inhabitants. De Grazia terms this belief "Quantavolution".

== Later career ==
In the early 1970s, de Grazia founded the "University of the New World" in Haute-Nendaz Switzerland, as an unstructured alternative to American universities. He invited Beat author William S. Burroughs to teach at it. In his biography of Burroughs, Ted Morgan described the students that it attracted as "drifters and dropouts on the international hippie circuit"; he suggested that this resulted in a culture clash with the "prim Swiss", and that the university lacked adequate facilities or a sound business model.

In 2002, de Grazia was appointed visiting professor in the Department of Mathematics, Statistics, Computing and Applications of the University of Bergamo in Italy. He had previously been a visiting lecturer at the University of Rome, the University of Bombay, the University of Istanbul, and the University of Gothenburg in Sweden.

== Personal life ==
Alfred de Grazia was married to Jill Oppenheim (d. 1996) from 1942 to 1971, to Nina Mavridis from 1972 to 1973, and from 1982 to his death to Anne-Marie (Ami) Hueber-de Grazia, a French writer.

He had seven children with Jill Oppenheim. One of them, Carl, a musician, died in 2000. One of his daughters, Victoria de Grazia, a Professor of Contemporary History at Columbia University, is a member of the American Academy.

The entire WWII correspondence between Alfred de Grazia and Jill Oppenheim, comprising about a thousand letters dated from February 1942 to September 1945, survived and was published and placed online, edited by Ami Hueber de Grazia.

== Works ==
- Michels, Robert, First lectures in political sociology. Translated, with an introduction, by Alfred de Grazia. Minneapolis: University of Minnesota Press, [1949]. And Harper & Row, 1965.
- Public and republic: political representation in America. New York: Knopf, 1951.
- The elements of political science Vol 1: Political Behavior and Vol. 2: Political organization. Series: Borzoi Books in Political Science. New York: Knopf, 1952. And second revised edition: Politics and government: the elements of political science. [1962]. New York: Collier, 1962– ; new revised edition, New York: Free Press London: Collier Macmillan, 1965.
- The Western Public: 1952 and beyond. [A study of political behaviour in the western United States.]. Stanford: Stanford University Press, [1954.]
- The American way of government. National edition. New York : Wiley, [1957]. There is also a "National, State and Local edition".
- Foundation for Voluntary Welfare. Grass roots private welfare : winning essays of the 1956 national awards competition of the Foundation for Voluntary Welfare. Alfred de Grazia, editor. New York: New York University Press, 1957.
- American welfare. New York: New York University Press, 1961 (with Ted Gurr).
- World politics: a study in international relations. Series: College Outline Series. New York: Barnes & Noble, 1962.
- Apportionment and representative government. Series: Books that matter. New York : Praeger, c.1963
- Essay on apportionment and representative government. Washington : American Enterprise Institute, 1963
- Revolution in teaching: new theory, technology, and curricula. With an introduction by Jerome Bruner. New York: Bantam Books, [1964] (editor, with David A. Sohn).
- Universal Reference System. Political science, government, and public policy: an annotated and intensively indexed compilation of significant books, pamphlets, and articles, selected and processed by the Universal Reference System. Prepared under the direction of Alfred De Grazia, general editor, Carl E. Martinson, managing editor, and John B. Simeone, consultant. Princeton, N.J.: Princeton Research Pub. Co., 1965–69. Plus nine more volumes on the subjects of: International Affairs; Economic Regulation; Public Policy and the Management of Science; Administrative Management; Comparative Government and Cultures; Legislative Process; Bibliography of Bibliographies in Political Science, Government and Public Policy; Current Events and Problems of Modern Society; Public Opinion, Mass Behavior and Political Psychology; Law, Jurisprudence and Judicial Process.
- Republic in crisis: Congress against the executive force. New York: Federal Legal Publications, [1965]
- Political behavior. Series: Elements of political science; 1. New, revised edition. New York: Free press paperback, 1966.
- Congress, The First Branch of Government, editor, Doubleday – Anchor Books, 1967
- Congress and the Presidency: Their Roles in Modern Times, with Arthur M. Schlesinger, American Enterprise Institute for Public Policy Research, Washington, 1967.
- Passage of the Year, Poetry, Quiddity Press, Metron publications, Princeton, N.J., 1967.
- The Behavioral Sciences: Essays in honor of George A. Lundberg, editor, Behavioral Research Council, Great Barrington, Mass;, 1968.
- Kalos: What is to be Done with Our World?,, New York University Press, 1968.
- Old Government, New People: Readings for the New politics, et al., Scott, Foresman, Glenview, Ill., 1971.
- Politics for Better or Worse, Scott, Foresman, Glenview, Ill., 1973.
- Eight Branches of Government: American Government Today, w. Eric Weise, Collegiate Pub., 1975.
- Eight Bads – Eight Goods: The American Contradictions, Doubleday – Anchor Books, 1975.
- Supporting Art and Culture: 1001 Questions on Policy, Lieber-Atherton, New York, 1979.
- Kalotics: A Revolution of Scientists and Technologists for World Development, Kalos Foundation, Bombay, 1979.
- A Cloud Over Bhopal: Causes, Consequences, and Constructive Solutions, Kalos Foundation for the India-America Committee for the Bhopal Victims: Popular Prakashan, Bombay, 1985.
- The Babe, Child of Boom and Bust in Old Chicago, umbilicus mundi, Quiddity Press, Metron Publications, Princeton, N.J., 1992.
- The Student: at Chicago in Hutchin's Hey-day, Quiddity Press, Metron Publications, Princeton N.J., 1991.
- The Taste of War: Soldiering in World War II, Quiddity Press, Metron Publications, Princeton, N.J., 1992.
- Twentieth Century Fire-Sale, Poetry, Quiddity Press, Metron Publications, Princeton, N.J., 1996.
- The American State of Canaan – the peaceful, prosperous juncture of Israel and Palestine as the 51st State of the United States of America, Metron Publications, Princeton, NJ, 2009 LCCN 2008945276.

== See also ==
- Velikovskyism
