= American Skin =

American Skin may refer to:

- "American Skin (41 Shots)", a song by Bruce Springsteen
- American Skin (film), a 2019 film
- American Skin, a 1998 novel by Don De Grazia
