= Mont Gond (Pennine Alps) =

Mountain in Switzerland

- Location within Switzerland

Highest point
- Elevation: 2,670 m (8,760 ft)
- Prominence: 109 m (358 ft)
- Coordinates: 46°7′45″N 7°17′31″E

Geography
- Location: Valais, Switzerland
- Parent range: Pennine Alps

Mont Gond is a mountain of the Pennine Alps, overlooking Siviez, south of Nendaz in the canton of Valais.
