= Victor deGrazia =

Victor R. de Grazia (March 21, 1929 – April 2, 2005) was best known as the campaign manager and deputy governor (1972–1976) to Illinois Governor Dan Walker.

Victor de Grazia was born in Chicago, Illinois, the son of Alfred Joseph de Grazia, a classical band leader and clarinetist, born in Licodia Eubea, Sicily. Victor de Grazia was the younger brother of Sebastian de Grazia, Alfred de Grazia and Edward de Grazia. He joined the Army at age 17 and served in Japan. He studied psychoanalysis and biochemistry at the University of Chicago and Lake Forest College and composition at the Chicago Conservatory of Music, but earned no degree.

Victor de Grazia was the mastermind of Walker's victory over Republican governor Richard B. Ogilvie in 1972, which was of one of the great upsets in recent Illinois political history.

Victor de Grazia was a controversial figure in Illinois politics. According to the Chicago Tribune, the enmity that developed between de Grazia and others stemmed from the Walker campaign and subsequent Walker administration battles against the late mayor Richard J. Daley. In 1974, Walker and de Grazia fielded legislative candidates against Daley allies. A year later, de Grazia and another top Walker aide demanded Daley resign as chairman of the Cook County Democratic organization.

An activist on urban housing, he worked for the late Gov. Adlai Stevenson's first presidential bid in 1952 and went to on to manage campaigns for former Chicago Alderman Leon Despres and former judge and White House Counsel Abner Mikva.

In 1961, Mr. de Grazia served as executive director of the state board of economic development for then-Gov. Otto Kerner.

Victor de Grazia developed a relationship with Walker as a result of his activities in the independent Democratic reform movement of the 1950s. He later served as deputy director to Walker in the federal investigation of the riots at the 1968 Democratic National Convention. He joined Walker's campaign in 1970 as its manager and also managed Walker's unsuccessful 1976 bid for re-election.

After the end of the Walker Administration, de Grazia became a successful jury consultant, contributing to the court victory of MCI against AT&T, which established the right of long distance providers to use local telephone lines owned by other telephone companies. He also represented Litton Industries and Northrop Corp.

Victor de Grazia died on April 2, 2005, in Siracusa, Sicily, while on a vacation.

== Sources ==
"Victor R. de Grazia, 76; Ex-governor's right-hand man," Chicago Tribune, Apr 9, 2005. pg. 23.

"Victor R. de Grazia, ran Walker's gov campaign," Chicago SunTimes, Apr. 8, 2005

Oral History Project at the University of Illinois at Springfield
