= Victoria de Grazia =

American historian

- Parent: Alfred de Grazia
- Relatives: Sebastian de Grazia; Edward de Grazia
- Awards: Guggenheim Fellowship (1999)

Academic background
- Education: Smith College (BA); Columbia University (PhD)

Academic work
- Discipline: European history
- Institutions: European University Institute; Rutgers University; City College of New York; Columbia University

Victoria de Grazia is the Moore Collegiate Professor of History at Columbia University and founding editor of Radical History Review.

== Biography ==
De Grazia comes from a family of academics. Her father was Alfred de Grazia, New York University political scientist and decorated World War II veteran specialized in Psychological operations. Among her uncles were Pulitzer Prize-winning author Sebastian de Grazia and first amendment lawyer and co-founder of Cardozo Law School Edward de Grazia.

De Grazia was educated at Smith College, University of Florence, and Columbia University where she received her Ph.D. in history with distinction in 1976. She taught at the European University Institute, Rutgers University, and the City College of New York before joining the Columbia University faculty. Her research focuses on twentieth-century European history and consumer culture from a gendered and comparative perspective.

She was the recipient of a Guggenheim Fellowship in 1999. She was named to the American Academy of Arts and Sciences in 2005.

== Publications ==
- The Culture of Consent: Mass Organization of Leisure in Fascist Italy, Cambridge University Press, 1981
- How Fascism Ruled Women: Italy, 1922-1945, University of California Press, 1993
- The Sex of Things: Gender and Consumption in Historical Perspective, University of California Press, 1996
- Irresistible Empire: America’s Advance through Twentieth Century Europe, Belknap Press, 2005.
- The Perfect Fascist: A Story of Love, Power, and Morality in Mussolini’s Italy, Belknap Press, 2020
- Soft-Power Internationalism: Competing for Cultural Influence in the 21st-Century Global Order, Columbia University Press, 2021

== Awards ==
De Grazia received a Silver Independent Publisher Book Award in World History in 2021. She received the Modern Language Association's Scaglione Prize for her 2020 book The Perfect Fascist: A Story of Love, Power, and Morality in Mussolini’s Italy.
