= Of Time, Work, and Leisure =

1962 book by Sebastian de Grazia

- Author: Sebastian de Grazia
- Language: English
- Subject: Leisure
- Published: 1962
- Publisher: Twentieth Century Fund
- Media type: Print
- ISBN: 0-679-74343-X

Of Time, Work, and Leisure is a 1962 book by Pulitzer prize-winning political scientist Sebastian de Grazia about the role of what he calls "work time", "free time", and "leisure time" in society. De Grazia argues that even though the average workday and work week are shorter, and technology frees up time for workers, the average worker has less free time today than they did in the past.

== Bibliography ==
- De Grazia, S. (1962). Of Time, Work, and Leisure. The Twentieth Century Fund. New York. LCCN 62-13331
- Hemingway, J. L. (1988). Leisure and Civility: Reflections on a Greek Ideal. Leisure Sciences. 10 (3), 179-191.
- Maciver, R. M. (October 5, 1962). Tyranny of the Clock: The Need To Enjoy What One Does Cannot Be Overestimated. Science. 138 (3536), 23-24. doi:10.1126/science.138.3536.23
- Willhoite, F. H. (1963). Book Reviews: Of Time, Work, and Leisure. The Journal of Politics. Southern Political Science Association. 25 (2), 382-383. doi:10.2307/2127474
