= Steven Schier =

American political scientist (born 1952)

Steven E. Schier (born 1952) is a professor of political science at Carleton College who specializes in American politics. He earned a BA at Simpson College and his MA and PhD degrees from the University of Wisconsin.

== Carleton College ==
Schier has taught courses on Congress, the presidency, American parties and elections, American public policy, and methods of political research. In 1983 he founded the Carleton in Washington program, an off-campus seminar and internship program, and conducted the program twelve times until 2010.

== Books ==
=== Sole author ===
- Panorama of a Presidency: How George W. Bush Acquired and Spent his Political Capital (2009) Winner of a CHOICE magazine "Outstanding Academic Book" award.
- You Call This An Election? America’s Peculiar Democracy (2003)
- By Invitation Only: The Rise of Exclusive Politics in the United States (2000)
- A Decade of Deficits: Congressional Thought and Fiscal Action (1992)
- The Rules and the Game: Democratic National Convention Delegate Selection in Iowa and Wisconsin 1968-76 (1980)

=== Co-author or contributor ===
- "American Government and Popular Discontent: Stability without Success" (2013) (Co-author with Todd E. Eberly)
- "Presidential Elections: Strategies and Structures of American Politics" (2011) Thirteenth edition. (Co-author with Nelson W. Polsby, Aaron Wildavsky and David A. Hopkins)
- "Transforming America: Barack Obama in the White House" (2011) (Editor; author of two chapters)
- Ambition and Division: Legacies of the George W. Bush Presidency (2009) (Editor; author of two chapters)
- The American Elections of 2008 (2009) (Coedited with Janet M. Box-Steffensmeier) (Editor, chapter coauthor)
- High Risk and Big Ambition: The Early Presidency of George W. Bush (2004) (Editor; author of two chapters)
- The Post-Modern President: Bill Clinton’s Legacy in American Politics (2000) Winner of a CHOICE magazine "Outstanding Academic Book" award. (Editor; author of two chapters)
- Payment Due: A Nation in Debt, A Generation in Trouble (1996) (Co-authored with Tim Penny)
- Congress: Games and Strategies (1995). (Co-authored with Stephen E. Frantzich)
- Political Economy in Western Democracies (1985) (Coedited and co-authored two chapters with Norman J. Vig)

== Television appearances ==
Steven Schier appeared on the O'Reilly Factor on October 18 and 25, 2004, to discuss election poll results.

He has also appeared on the CBS Evening News and Cable News Network as a political analyst and has served as a political analyst for the WCCO and KSTP television stations in Minneapolis-St. Paul.
