= Vétroz =

- Municipality
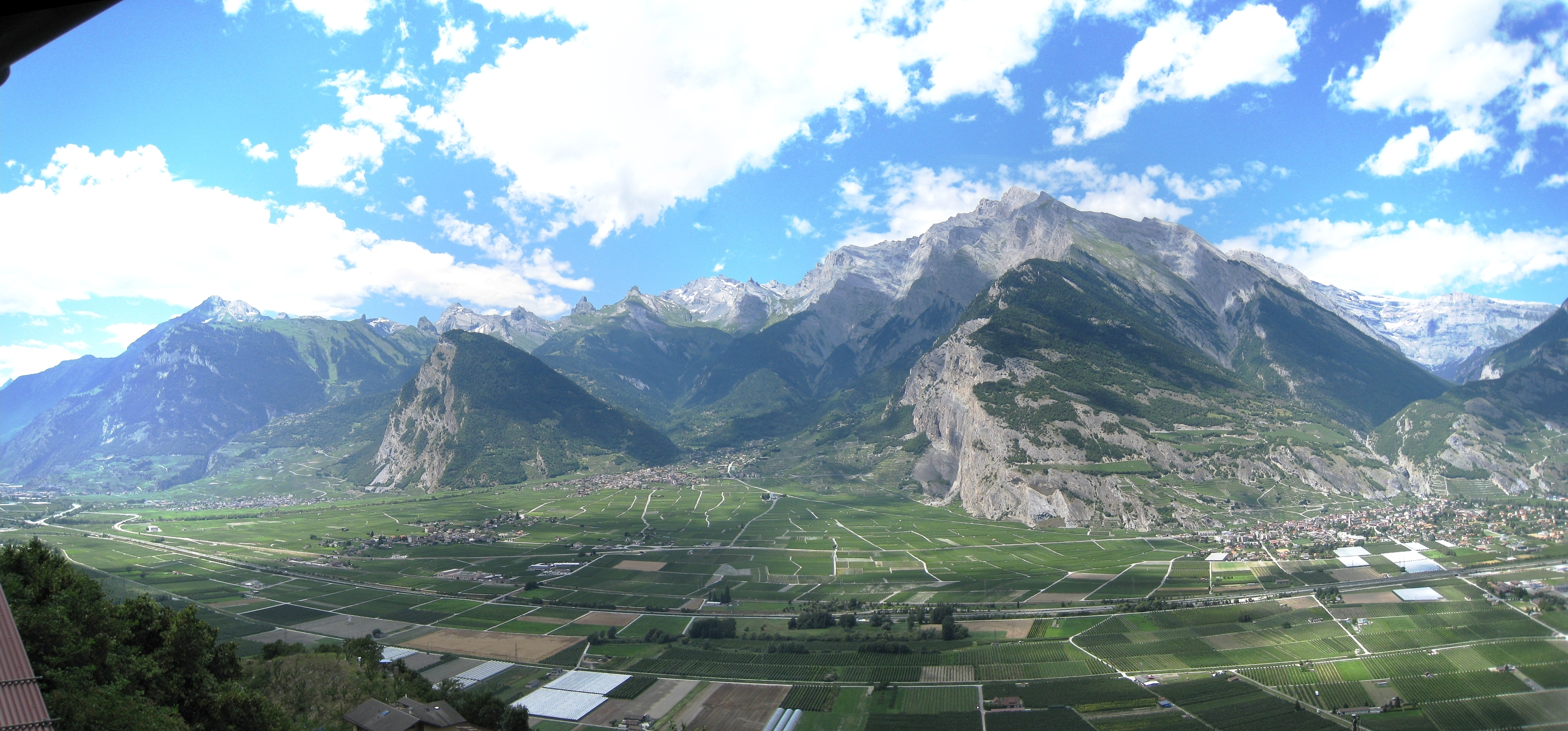

- Flag Coat of arms
- Location of Vétroz
- Location within Switzerland Location within Canton of Valais
- Coordinates: 46°13′N 7°16′E
- Country: Switzerland
- Canton: Valais
- District: Conthey

Government
  - Mayor: Stéphane Germanier

Area
  - Total: 10.5 km^{2} (4.1 sq mi)
- Elevation: 483 m (1,585 ft)

Population (December 2002)
  - Total: 4,047
  - Density: 385/km^{2} (998/sq mi)
- Time zone: UTC+01:00 (CET)
  - Summer (DST): UTC+02:00 (CEST)
- Postal code: 1963
- SFOS number: 6025
- ISO 3166 code: CH-VS
- Surrounded by: Ardon, Conthey, Nendaz
- Twin towns: Beaumont-lès-Valence (France)
- Website: www.vetroz.ch

Vétroz (Arpitan: Vètro) is a municipality in the district of Conthey in the canton of Valais in Switzerland.

== Geography ==
Aerial view (1949)

Vétroz has an area, as of 2009, of 10.5 square kilometers (4.1 mi^{2}). Of this area, 4.97 km^{2} (1.92 mi^{2}) or 47.6% is used for agricultural purposes, while 2.06 km^{2} (0.80 mi^{2}) or 19.7% is forested. Of the rest of the land, 1.91 km^{2} (0.74 mi^{2}) or 18.3% is settled (buildings or roads), 0.25 km^{2} (0.097 mi^{2}) or 2.4% is either rivers or lakes and 1.2 km^{2} (0.46 mi^{2}) or 11.5% is unproductive land.

Of the built up area, industrial buildings made up 2.0% of the total area while housing and buildings made up 8.2% and transportation infrastructure made up 6.3%. Power and water infrastructure as well as other special developed areas made up 1.1% of the area Out of the forested land, 16.6% of the total land area is heavily forested and 1.5% is covered with orchards or small clusters of trees. Of the agricultural land, 17.0% is used for growing crops and 3.3% is pastures, while 26.9% is used for orchards or vine crops. All the water in the municipality is flowing water. Of the unproductive areas, 2.1% is unproductive vegetation and 9.4% is too rocky for vegetation.

In 1880 the municipality was formed when it became independent from Conthey.

== Coat of arms ==
The blazon of the municipal coat of arms is Gules, a Vine Branch Vert fructed Or, in Chief Azure between two Mullets of Five Or a Cross pommy of the same.

== Demographics ==
Vétroz has a population (as of December 2020) of 6,397. As of 2008, 23.0% of the population are resident foreign nationals. Over the last 10 years (1999–2009 ) the population has changed at a rate of 15%. It has changed at a rate of 16% due to migration and at a rate of 4% due to births and deaths.

Most of the population (as of 2000) speaks French (3,253 or 88.1%) as their first language, German is the second most common (121 or 3.3%) and Portuguese is the third (117 or 3.2%). There are 108 people who speak Italian.

As of 2008, the gender distribution of the population was 49.3% male and 50.7% female. The population was made up of 1,667 Swiss men (37.0% of the population) and 552 (12.3%) non-Swiss men. There were 1,788 Swiss women (39.7%) and 497 (11.0%) non-Swiss women. Of the population in the municipality 1,280 or about 34.7% were born in Vétroz and lived there in 2000. There were 1,228 or 33.3% who were born in the same canton, while 374 or 10.1% were born somewhere else in Switzerland, and 654 or 17.7% were born outside of Switzerland.

The age distribution of the population (as of 2000) is children and teenagers (0–19 years old) make up 26.4% of the population, while adults (20–64 years old) make up 60.7% and seniors (over 64 years old) make up 13%.

As of 2000, there were 1,429 people who were single and never married in the municipality. There were 1,910 married individuals, 204 widows or widowers and 148 individuals who are divorced.

As of 2000, there were 1,315 private households in the municipality, and an average of 2.7 persons per household. There were 284 households that consist of only one person and 106 households with five or more people. Out of a total of 1,358 households that answered this question, 20.9% were households made up of just one person and there were 15 adults who lived with their parents. Of the rest of the households, there are 323 married couples without children, 593 married couples with children There were 85 single parents with a child or children. There were 15 households that were made up of unrelated people and 43 households that were made up of some sort of institution or another collective housing.

In 2000 there were 670 single family homes (or 75.5% of the total) out of a total of 887 inhabited buildings. There were 150 multi-family buildings (16.9%), along with 41 multi-purpose buildings that were mostly used for housing (4.6%) and 26 other use buildings (commercial or industrial) that also had some housing (2.9%).

In 2000, a total of 1,235 apartments (87.9% of the total) were permanently occupied, while 130 apartments (9.3%) were seasonally occupied and 40 apartments (2.8%) were empty. As of 2009, the construction rate of new housing units was 8.7 new units per 1000 residents.

The historical population is given in the following chart:

== Politics ==
The local executive is called "Conseil Municipal", the local parliament "Conseil général".

In the Elections of 24 October 2012 the following persons were elected to the Conseil Municipal: André Fontannaz (CDP), Stéphane Germanier (CDP), Véronique Papilloud-Sauthier (CDP), Michel Huser (FDP) and Oliver Cottagnoud (Alternative vétrozaine or Alternative Left).

=== National election results ===
In the 2007 federal election the most popular party was the FDP which received 38.03% of the vote. The next three most popular parties were the CVP (31.98%), the SVP (12.98%) and the SP (10.51%). In the federal election, a total of 1,749 votes were cast, and the voter turnout was 67.1%.

In the 2009 Conseil d'État/Staatsrat election a total of 1,531 votes were cast, of which 79 or about 5.2% were invalid. The voter participation was 57.9%, which is similar to the cantonal average of 54.67%. In the 2007 Swiss Council of States election a total of 1,736 votes were cast, of which 90 or about 5.2% were invalid. The voter participation was 66.9%, which is much more than the cantonal average of 59.88%.

== Economy ==
As of 2010, Vétroz had an unemployment rate of 5.4%. As of 2008, there were 196 people employed in the primary economic sector and about 68 businesses involved in this sector. 348 people were employed in the secondary sector and there were 46 businesses in this sector. 655 people were employed in the tertiary sector, with 89 businesses in this sector. There were 1,766 residents of the municipality who were employed in some capacity, of which females made up 41.6% of the workforce.

In 2008 the total number of full-time equivalent jobs was 980. The number of jobs in the primary sector was 121, all of which were in agriculture. The number of jobs in the secondary sector was 326 of which 80 or (24.5%) were in manufacturing and 220 (67.5%) were in construction. The number of jobs in the tertiary sector was 533. In the tertiary sector; 124 or 23.3% were in wholesale or retail sales or the repair of motor vehicles, 9 or 1.7% were in the movement and storage of goods, 66 or 12.4% were in a hotel or restaurant, 9 or 1.7% were in the information industry, 5 or 0.9% were the insurance or financial industry, 19 or 3.6% were technical professionals or scientists, 36 or 6.8% were in education and 121 or 22.7% were in health care.

In 2000, there were 381 workers who commuted into the municipality and 1,299 workers who commuted away. The municipality is a net exporter of workers, with about 3.4 workers leaving the municipality for every one entering. Of the working population, 8.3% used public transportation to get to work, and 74.5% used a private car.

== Religion ==
From the 2000 census, 3,098 or 83.9% were Roman Catholic, while 155 or 4.2% belonged to the Swiss Reformed Church. Of the rest of the population, there were 11 members of an Orthodox church (or about 0.30% of the population), there were 8 individuals (or about 0.22% of the population) who belonged to the Christian Catholic Church, and there were 47 individuals (or about 1.27% of the population) who belonged to another Christian church. There were 95 (or about 2.57% of the population) who were Islamic. There were 6 individuals who were Buddhist, 1 person who was Hindu and 2 individuals who belonged to another church. 104 (or about 2.82% of the population) belonged to no church, are agnostic or atheist, and 187 individuals (or about 5.07% of the population) did not answer the question.

== Education ==
In Vétroz about 1,189 or (32.2%) of the population have completed non-mandatory upper secondary education, and 424 or (11.5%) have completed additional higher education (either university or a Fachhochschule). Of the 424 who completed tertiary schooling, 64.6% were Swiss men, 28.3% were Swiss women, 4.2% were non-Swiss men and 2.8% were non-Swiss women.

As of 2000, there was one student in Vétroz who came from another municipality, while 332 residents attended schools outside the municipality.

Vétroz is home to the Bibliothèque de Vétroz-Magnot library. The library has (as of 2008) 8,259 books or other media, and loaned out 20,575 items in the same year. It was open a total of 127 days with average of 7 hours per week during that year.
