= Conthey =

- Municipality
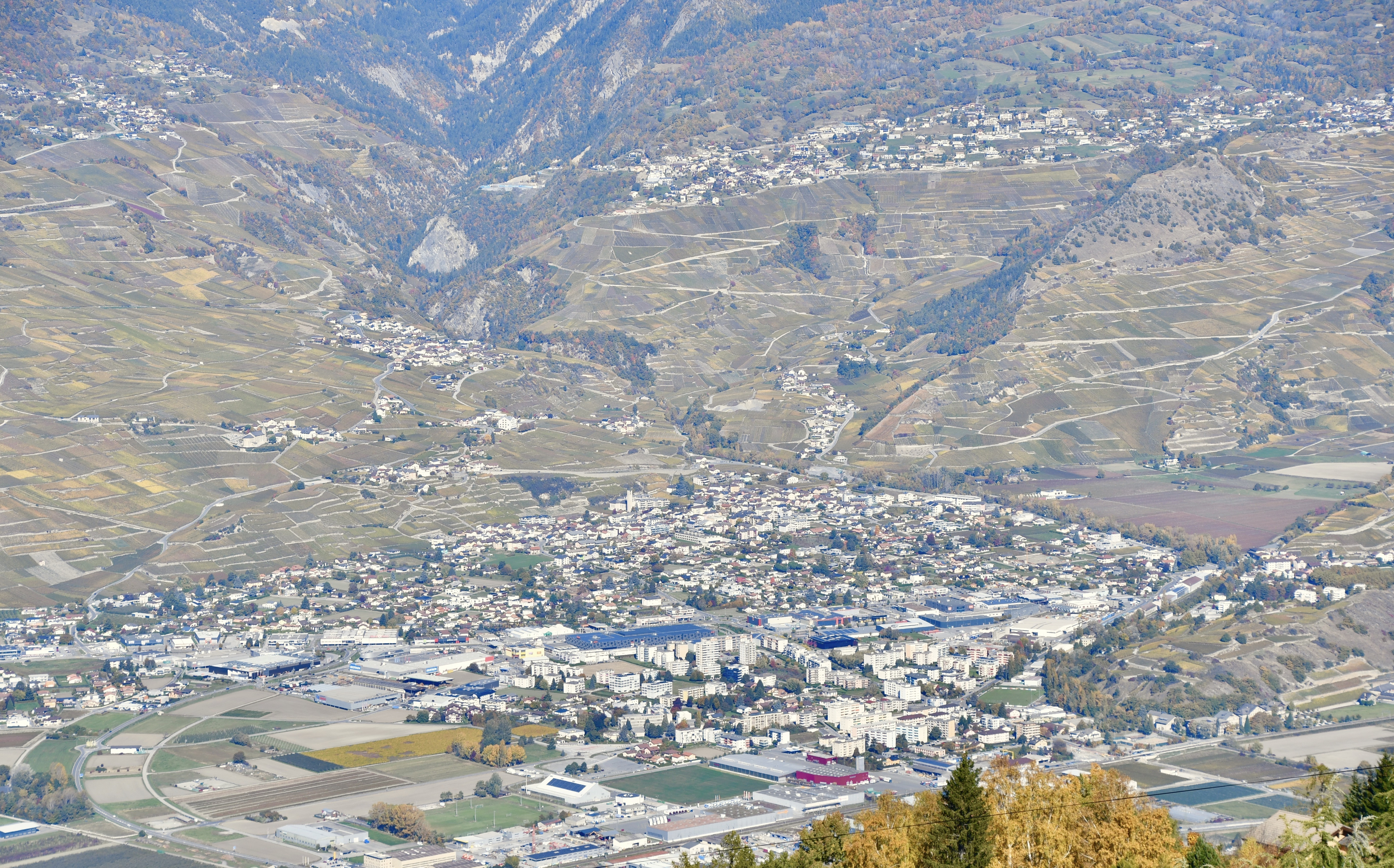
- Conthey as seen from Nendaz

- Flag Coat of arms
- Location of Conthey
- Location within Switzerland Location within Canton of Valais
- Coordinates: 46°13′N 7°18′E
- Country: Switzerland
- Canton: Valais
- District: Conthey

Government
  - Mayor: Jean-Pierre Penon

Area
  - Total: 85.1 km^{2} (32.9 sq mi)
- Elevation: 504 m (1,654 ft)

Population (December 2002)
  - Total: 6,568
  - Density: 77.2/km^{2} (200/sq mi)
- Time zone: UTC+01:00 (CET)
  - Summer (DST): UTC+02:00 (CEST)
- Postal code: 1964
- SFOS number: 6023
- ISO 3166 code: CH-VS
- Surrounded by: Ardon, Bex (VD), Chamoson, Nendaz, Ormont-Dessus (VD), Savièse, Sion, Vétroz
- Website: www.conthey.ch

Conthey (French pronunciation: [kɔ̃tɛ]) is a municipality in the district of Conthey in the canton of Valais in Switzerland.

== History ==
Conthey is first mentioned about 800 as curtis Contextis. In 1146 it was mentioned as ecclesiam de Plano Contesio.

== Geography ==
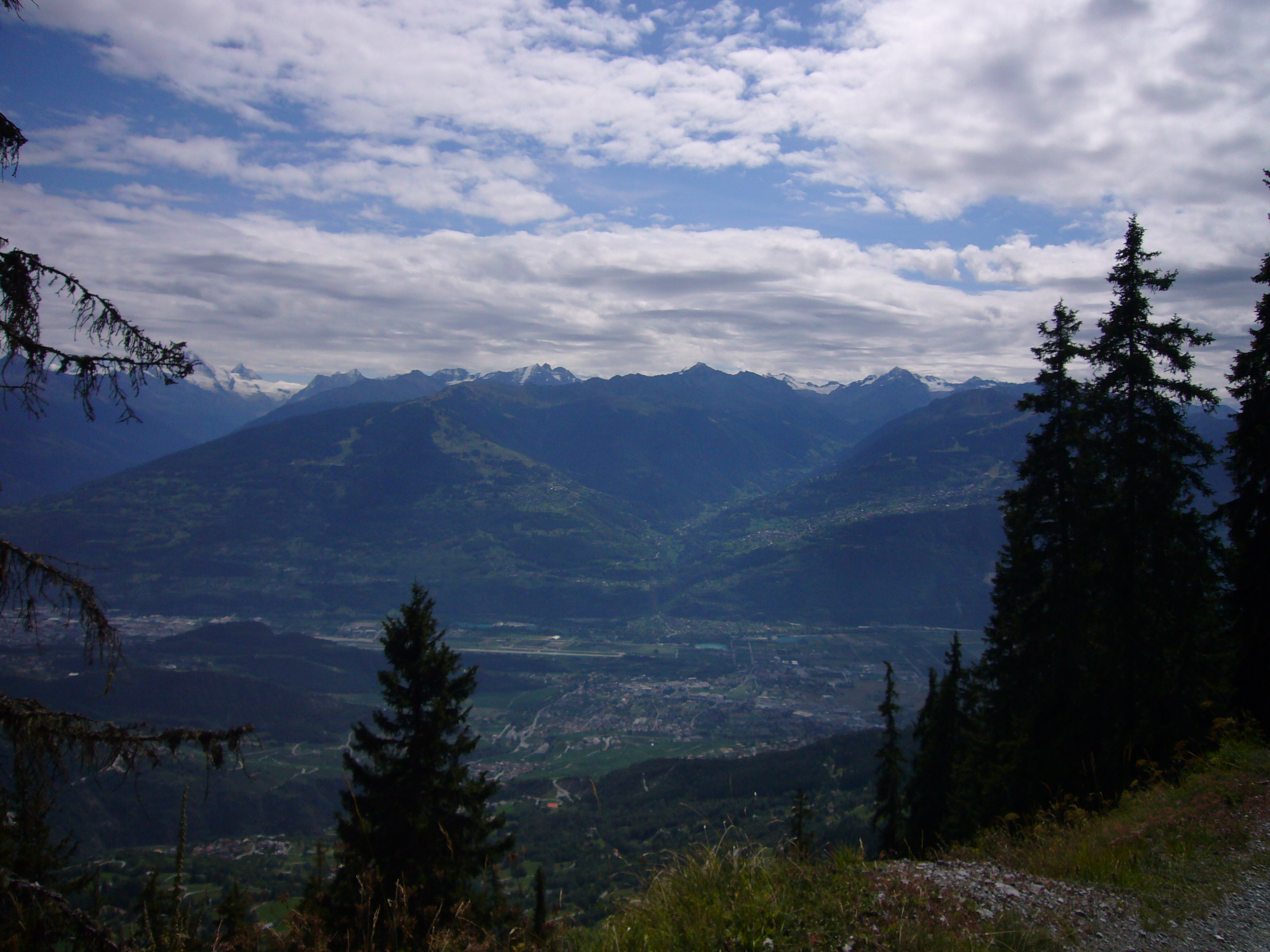
View from Mayens-de-Conthey down the mountain toward Conthey

Aerial view (1955)

Conthey has an area, as of 2009, of 85 square kilometers (33 mi^{2}). Of this area, 19.81 km^{2} (7.65 mi^{2}) or 23.3% is used for agricultural purposes, while 22.39 km^{2} (8.64 mi^{2}) or 26.3% is forested. Of the rest of the land, 4.29 km^{2} (1.66 mi^{2}) or 5.0% is settled (buildings or roads), 0.75 km^{2} (0.29 mi^{2}) or 0.9% is either rivers or lakes and 37.85 km^{2} (14.61 mi^{2}) or 44.5% is unproductive land.

Of the built up area, housing and buildings made up 2.5% and transportation infrastructure made up 1.5%. Out of the forested land, 21.3% of the total land area is heavily forested and 3.5% is covered with orchards or small clusters of trees. Of the agricultural land, 0.6% is used for growing crops and 1.6% is pastures, while 4.8% is used for orchards or vine crops and 16.4% is used for alpine pastures. Of the water in the municipality, 0.2% is in lakes and 0.6% is in rivers and streams. Of the unproductive areas, 12.7% is unproductive vegetation, 30.5% is too rocky for vegetation and 1.4% of the land is covered by glaciers.

The municipality is located on the right bank of the Rhone in the middle Valais. It stretches from the valley floor to the peak of the Diableret-Massiv. It consists of the village of Conthey (made up of Plan-Conthey, La Place, Le Bourg and Saint-Séverin) and the villages of Aven, Erde, Sensine, Premploz and Daillon in the Derborence area.

== Coat of arms ==
The blazon of the municipal coat of arms is Argent, between two Branches of Vine Vert fructed Azure in saltire three Mullets of Five Gules.

== Demographics ==
Conthey has a population (as of December 2020) of 8,857. As of 2008, 18.4% of the population are resident foreign nationals. Over the last 10 years (1999–2009 ) the population has changed at a rate of 18.6%. It has changed at a rate of 18.5% due to migration and at a rate of 1.9% due to births and deaths.

Most of the population (as of 2000) speaks French (5,716 or 91.3%) as their first language, German is the second most common (136 or 2.2%) and Portuguese is the third (130 or 2.1%). There are 71 people who speak Italian and 2 people who speak Romansh.

As of 2008, the gender distribution of the population was 49.7% male and 50.3% female. The population was made up of 2,906 Swiss men (39.0% of the population) and 797 (10.7%) non-Swiss men. There were 3,099 Swiss women (41.6%) and 643 (8.6%) non-Swiss women. Of the population in the municipality 2,918 or about 46.6% were born in Conthey and lived there in 2000. There were 1,620 or 25.9% who were born in the same canton, while 591 or 9.4% were born somewhere else in Switzerland, and 953 or 15.2% were born outside of Switzerland.

The age distribution of the population (as of 2000) is children and teenagers (0–19 years old) make up 24.2% of the population, while adults (20–64 years old) make up 61% and seniors (over 64 years old) make up 14.8%.

As of 2000, there were 2,431 people who were single and never married in the municipality. There were 3,151 married individuals, 385 widows or widowers and 294 individuals who are divorced.

As of 2000 the average number of residents per living room was 0.63 which is about equal to the cantonal average of 0.63 per room. In this case, a room is defined as space of a housing unit of at least 4 m^{2} (43 sq ft) as normal bedrooms, dining rooms, living rooms, kitchens and habitable cellars and attics. About 61.2% of the total households were owner occupied, or in other words did not pay rent (though they may have a mortgage or a rent-to-own agreement).

As of 2000, there were 2,528 private households in the municipality, and an average of 2.4 persons per household. There were 708 households that consist of only one person and 172 households with five or more people. Out of a total of 2,559 households that answered this question, 27.7% were households made up of just one person and there were 32 adults who lived with their parents. Of the rest of the households, there are 722 married couples without children, 898 married couples with children There were 140 single parents with a child or children. There were 28 households that were made up of unrelated people and 31 households that were made up of some sort of institution or another collective housing.

In 2000 there were 1,076 single family homes (or 68.2% of the total) out of a total of 1,578 inhabited buildings. There were 338 multi-family buildings (21.4%), along with 119 multi-purpose buildings that were mostly used for housing (7.5%) and 45 other use buildings (commercial or industrial) that also had some housing (2.9%).

In 2000, a total of 2,436 apartments (87.4% of the total) were permanently occupied, while 254 apartments (9.1%) were seasonally occupied and 97 apartments (3.5%) were empty. As of 2009, the construction rate of new housing units was 15.2 new units per 1000 residents. The vacancy rate for the municipality, in 2010, was 1.87%.

The historical population is given in the following chart:

== Sights ==
The entire region of Conthey-Bourg / Saint-Séverin is designated as part of the Inventory of Swiss Heritage Sites.

== Politics ==
In the 2007 federal election the most popular party was the CVP which received 34.27% of the vote. The next three most popular parties were the FDP (27.73%), the SVP (13.71%) and the SP (13.19%). In the federal election, a total of 3,025 votes were cast, and the voter turnout was 62.7%.

In the 2009 Conseil d'État/Staatsrat election a total of 2,625 votes were cast, of which 191 or about 7.3% were invalid. The voter participation was 54.5%, which is similar to the cantonal average of 54.67%. In the 2007 Swiss Council of States election a total of 2,997 votes were cast, of which 193 or about 6.4% were invalid. The voter participation was 62.1%, which is similar to the cantonal average of 59.88%.

== Economy ==
As of 2010, Conthey had an unemployment rate of 6.4%. As of 2008, there were 381 people employed in the primary economic sector and about 192 businesses involved in this sector. 597 people were employed in the secondary sector and there were 72 businesses in this sector. 2,046 people were employed in the tertiary sector, with 253 businesses in this sector. There were 3,102 residents of the municipality who were employed in some capacity, of which females made up 42.4% of the workforce.

In 2008 the total number of full-time equivalent jobs was 2,439. The number of jobs in the primary sector was 206, of which 202 were in agriculture and 3 were in forestry or lumber production. The number of jobs in the secondary sector was 566 of which 232 or (41.0%) were in manufacturing and 333 (58.8%) were in construction. The number of jobs in the tertiary sector was 1,667. In the tertiary sector; 1,063 or 63.8% were in wholesale or retail sales or the repair of motor vehicles, 57 or 3.4% were in the movement and storage of goods, 144 or 8.6% were in a hotel or restaurant, 8 or 0.5% were in the information industry, 12 or 0.7% were the insurance or financial industry, 109 or 6.5% were technical professionals or scientists, 85 or 5.1% were in education and 31 or 1.9% were in health care.

In 2000, there were 1,219 workers who commuted into the municipality and 1,994 workers who commuted away. The municipality is a net exporter of workers, with about 1.6 workers leaving the municipality for every one entering. Of the working population, 9% used public transportation to get to work, and 74.7% used a private car.

Dôle Blanche is a popular white wine, created from two red grapes, gamay and pinot noir. Dôle Blanche was first created by Francois Udry at the Café de l'Union in Conthey in 1922. In 1984 the term Dôle Blanche became a generic name throughout the Valais Canton.

== Religion ==
From the 2000 census, 5,195 or 83.0% were Roman Catholic, while 294 or 4.7% belonged to the Swiss Reformed Church. Of the rest of the population, there were 32 members of an Orthodox church (or about 0.51% of the population), there was 1 individual who belongs to the Christian Catholic Church, and there were 95 individuals (or about 1.52% of the population) who belonged to another Christian church. There were 5 individuals (or about 0.08% of the population) who were Jewish, and 237 (or about 3.79% of the population) who were Islamic. There were 6 individuals who were Buddhist, 3 individuals who were Hindu and 6 individuals who belonged to another church. 213 (or about 3.40% of the population) belonged to no church, are agnostic or atheist, and 221 individuals (or about 3.53% of the population) did not answer the question.

== Education ==
In Conthey about 2,158 or (34.5%) of the population have completed non-mandatory upper secondary education, and 573 or (9.2%) have completed additional higher education (either university or a Fachhochschule). Of the 573 who completed tertiary schooling, 64.4% were Swiss men, 26.5% were Swiss women, 6.1% were non-Swiss men and 3.0% were non-Swiss women.

As of 2000, there were 352 students in Conthey who came from another municipality, while 296 residents attended schools outside the municipality.

Conthey is home to the Bibliothèque de Conthey library. The library has (as of 2008) 21,500 books or other media, and loaned out 18,925 items in the same year. It was open a total of 240 days with average of 11 hours per week during that year.

== Notable people ==
- Peter Roh (born 1811 in Conthey - 1872) a Swiss Jesuit preacher.
