= Jazmín De Grazia =

Argentine model and television presenter

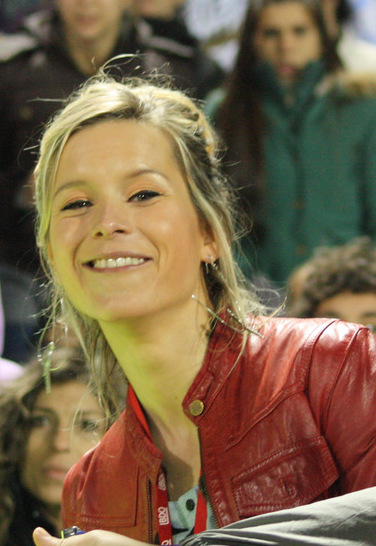
- De Grazia in September 2010
- Born: 4 July 1984; Temperley, Greater Buenos Aires, Argentina
- Died: 5 February 2012 (aged 27); Recoleta, Buenos Aires, Argentina
- Occupation(s): Model, television presenter

Jazmín De Grazia (4 July 1984 – 5 February 2012) was an Argentine model and television presenter. She was one of the three finalists of the television modelling contest SuperM 20-02. She later worked as a host and panelist in different television shows.

== Career ==
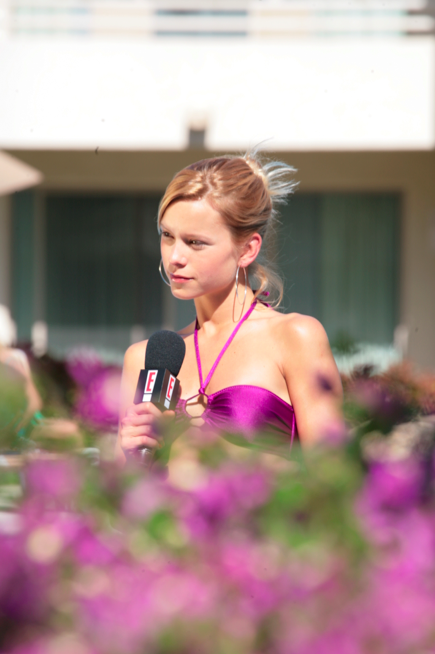
De Grazia as a television journalist

Her career as a model began when she enrolled in the modeling course at the agency of Ricardo Piñeiro, during which she learned about the Super M 20-02 contest. She signed up for it, and after living with 15 other women, she was among the three finalists. After the contest, she began to work as a model participating in multiple fashion shows, advertising campaigns and national and international television commercials.

In November 2005, De Grazia began to venture into television as presenter of the programme Princesas broadcast by El Trece alongside model Paula Chaves, as well as shows on E! Entertainment, FTV, MTV, Motorockers Bands on Fox and 100% Polo on Fox Sports Latin America. In addition, during 2009 she led the rock column for Radio Uno, Los number one. During this time, she completed her higher education at Taller Escuela Agencia (TEA), where she graduated as a journalist in 2009.

Starting in January 2010, she began writing in-depth interviews for Las Rosas magazine. In 2010, she also worked as a panelist for the television program Duro de domar for two months before being dismissed, reportedly due to her criticism of Chief of Cabinet of Ministers Aníbal Fernández.

== Death ==
On 5 February 2012, she was found dead in the bathtub of her apartment in the Buenos Aires neighborhood of Recoleta by her boyfriend. Her boyfriend had come to her aid after De Grazia called to tell him that she was feeling unwell. The reasons for her death were initially not disclosed at the time. Days later, the autopsy revealed that De Grazia's cause of death was due to "asphyxiation by immersion", caused by "fainting due to a cocaine overdose". According to the investigation, De Grazia fainted after consuming a drug cocktail that included cocaine and anxiolytics. According to reports, on the mirror of her bathroom, the phrase "Vos no tenés la culpa de que el mundo sea tan feo" ("You are not to blame for the world being so ugly") was found written in rouge. Despite raising speculation, it was found that the quote is a fragment of the song "Lágrimas de oro" by Manu Chao, and that it was written a month before De Grazia died, and as such it was not considered a suicide note.

The news of De Grazia's death received international coverage. Four days after her death, the Crónica newspaper published photos of De Grazia's dead body in her bathtub, leaked from the police. The publication of the photos generated rejection not only from De Grazia's family, but also from the newspaper's own reading public. Finally, De Grazia's family won a lawsuit and the images were removed from web searches.
