= Chamoson =

- Municipality
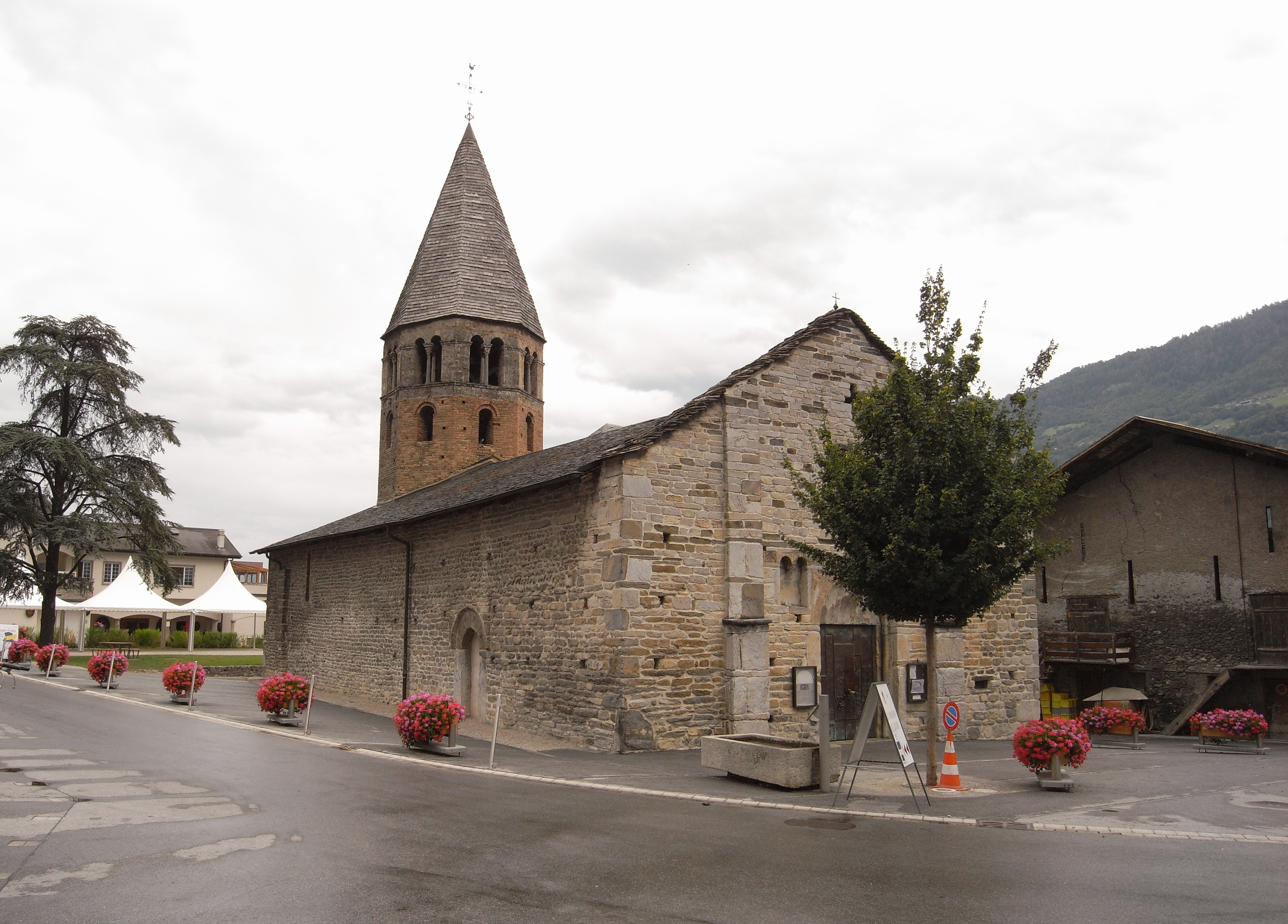

- Flag Coat of arms
- Location of Chamoson
- Location within Switzerland Location within Canton of Valais
- Coordinates: 46°12′N 7°13′E
- Country: Switzerland
- Canton: Valais
- District: Conthey

Government
  - Mayor: Claude Crittin

Area
  - Total: 32.5 km^{2} (12.5 sq mi)
- Elevation: 600–2,500 m (2,000–8,200 ft)

Population (December 2002)
  - Total: 2,613
  - Density: 80.4/km^{2} (208/sq mi)
- Time zone: UTC+01:00 (CET)
  - Summer (DST): UTC+02:00 (CEST)
- Postal code: 1955
- SFOS number: 6022
- ISO 3166 code: CH-VS
- Surrounded by: Ardon, Bex (VD), Conthey, Leytron, Nendaz, Riddes
- Website: www.chamoson.ch

Chamoson (French pronunciation: [ʃamozɔ̃]) is a municipality in the district of Conthey in the canton of Valais in Switzerland.

== History ==
Chamoson is first mentioned in 1050 as Camusia. In 1233 it was mentioned as Scamosun.

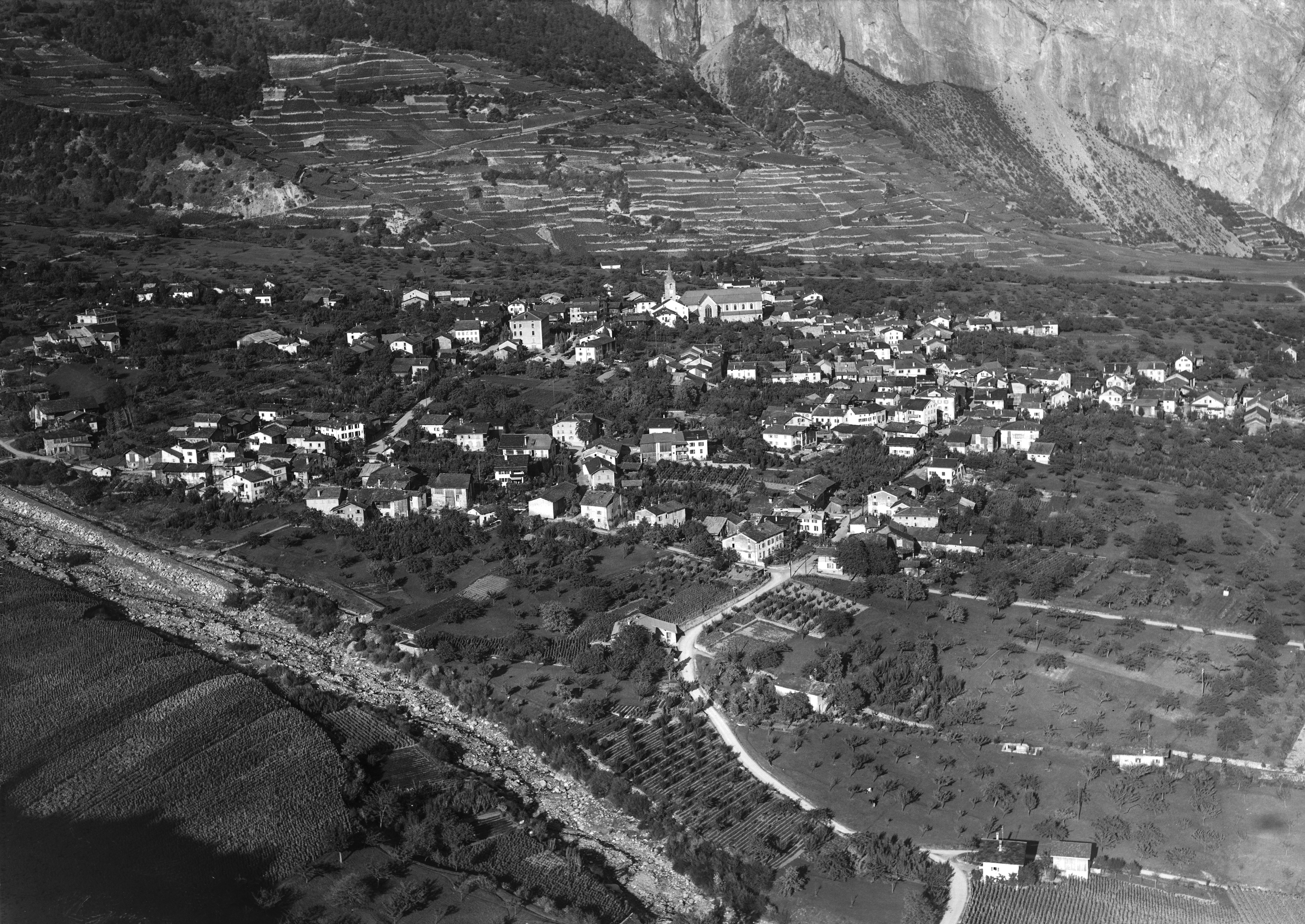
Historic aerial photograph by Werner Friedli from 1955

== Geography ==
Chamoson has an area, as of 2009, of 32.5 square kilometers (12.5 mi^{2}). Of this area, 8.02 km^{2} (3.10 mi^{2}) or 24.7% is used for agricultural purposes, while 10.11 km^{2} (3.90 mi^{2}) or 31.1% is forested. Of the rest of the land, 2.29 km^{2} (0.88 mi^{2}) or 7.1% is settled (buildings or roads), 0.54 km^{2} (0.21 mi^{2}) or 1.7% is either rivers or lakes and 11.44 km^{2} (4.42 mi^{2}) or 35.2% is unproductive land.

Of the built up area, housing and buildings made up 3.2% and transportation infrastructure made up 2.9%. Out of the forested land, 25.3% of the total land area is heavily forested and 1.9% is covered with orchards or small clusters of trees. Of the agricultural land, 1.1% is used for growing crops and 1.8% is pastures, while 15.9% is used for orchards or vine crops and 6.0% is used for alpine pastures. All the water in the municipality is flowing water. Of the unproductive areas, 6.5% is unproductive vegetation and 28.6% is too rocky for vegetation.

The municipality is located on the right side of the Rhone. It consists of the settlements of Chamoson, Saint-Pierre-de-Clages and Grugnay as well as the spring pasture camp of Mayens-de-Chamoson.

== Coat of arms ==
The blazon of the municipal coat of arms is Quarterly Argent and Gules.

== Demographics ==
Chamoson has a population (as of December 2020) of 3,986. As of 2008, 14.9% of the population are resident foreign nationals. Over the last 10 years (1999–2009 ) the population has changed at a rate of 20.8%. It has changed at a rate of 21.6% due to migration and at a rate of -0.4% due to births and deaths.

Most of the population (as of 2000) speaks French (2,340 or 93.7%) as their first language, German is the second most common (53 or 2.1%) and Portuguese is the third (43 or 1.7%). There are 23 people who speak Italian.

As of 2008, the gender distribution of the population was 48.5% male and 51.5% female. The population was made up of 1,219 Swiss men (40.2% of the population) and 251 (8.3%) non-Swiss men. There were 1,338 Swiss women (44.1%) and 226 (7.4%) non-Swiss women. Of the population in the municipality 1,338 or about 53.6% were born in Chamoson and lived there in 2000. There were 549 or 22.0% who were born in the same canton, while 258 or 10.3% were born somewhere else in Switzerland, and 275 or 11.0% were born outside of Switzerland.

The age distribution of the population (as of 2000) is children and teenagers (0–19 years old) make up 21.9% of the population, while adults (20–64 years old) make up 58.7% and seniors (over 64 years old) make up 19.4%.

As of 2000, there were 942 people who were single and never married in the municipality. There were 1,274 married individuals, 192 widows or widowers and 89 individuals who are divorced.

As of 2000, there were 1,008 private households in the municipality, and an average of 2.4 persons per household. There were 292 households that consist of only one person and 55 households with five or more people. Out of a total of 1,025 households that answered this question, 28.5% were households made up of just one person and there were 20 adults who lived with their parents. Of the rest of the households, there are 306 married couples without children, 323 married couples with children There were 57 single parents with a child or children. There were 10 households that were made up of unrelated people and 17 households that were made up of some sort of institution or another collective housing.

In 2000 there were 882 single family homes (or 75.1% of the total) out of a total of 1,174 inhabited buildings. There were 124 multi-family buildings (10.6%), along with 98 multi-purpose buildings that were mostly used for housing (8.3%) and 70 other use buildings (commercial or industrial) that also had some housing (6.0%).

In 2000, a total of 971 apartments (62.8% of the total) were permanently occupied, while 471 apartments (30.5%) were seasonally occupied and 104 apartments (6.7%) were empty. As of 2009, the construction rate of new housing units was 8.6 new units per 1000 residents. The vacancy rate for the municipality, in 2010, was 0.29%.

The historical population is given in the following chart:

== Heritage sites of national significance ==
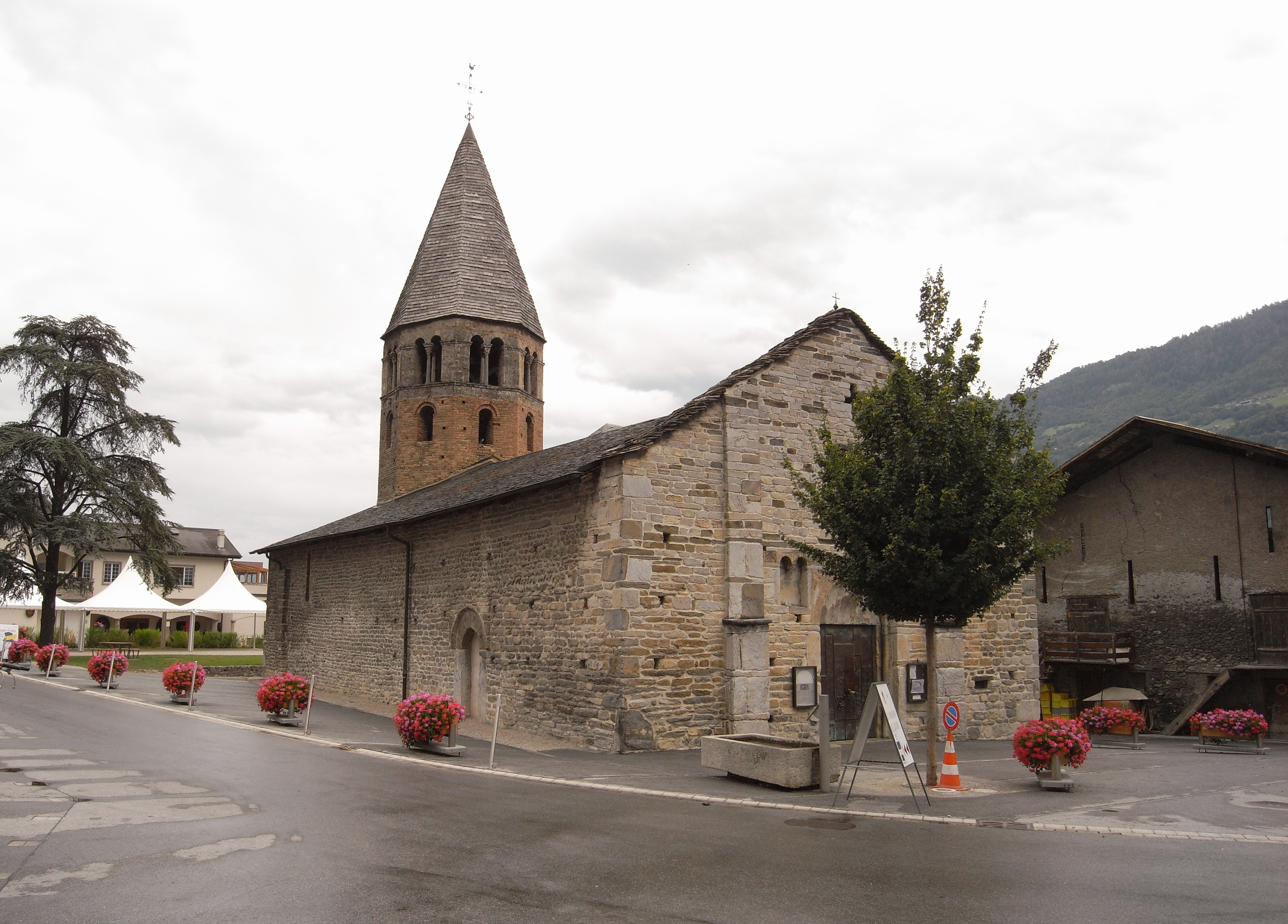
Church of St-Pierre

The Church of St-Pierre and its priory are listed as Swiss heritage site of national significance. The village of Saint-Pierre de Clages is part of the Inventory of Swiss Heritage Sites.

== Politics ==
In the 2007 federal election the most popular party was the CVP which received 36.73% of the vote. The next three most popular parties were the FDP (26.06%), the SVP (18.98%) and the SP (10.96%). In the federal election, a total of 1,207 votes were cast, and the voter turnout was 58.8%.

In the 2009 Conseil d'État/Staatsrat election a total of 1,094 votes were cast, of which 89 or about 8.1% were invalid. The voter participation was 53.2%, which is similar to the cantonal average of 54.67%. In the 2007 Swiss Council of States election a total of 1,185 votes were cast, of which 84 or about 7.1% were invalid. The voter participation was 59.1%, which is similar to the cantonal average of 59.88%.

== Economy ==
As of 2010, Chamoson had an unemployment rate of 6.9%. As of 2008, there were 423 people employed in the primary economic sector and about 118 businesses involved in this sector. 272 people were employed in the secondary sector and there were 41 businesses in this sector. 370 people were employed in the tertiary sector, with 86 businesses in this sector. There were 1,193 residents of the municipality who were employed in some capacity, of which females made up 42.1% of the workforce.

In 2008 the total number of full-time equivalent jobs was 775. The number of jobs in the primary sector was 238, all of which were in agriculture. The number of jobs in the secondary sector was 250 of which 145 or (58.0%) were in manufacturing and 101 (40.4%) were in construction. The number of jobs in the tertiary sector was 287. In the tertiary sector; 74 or 25.8% were in wholesale or retail sales or the repair of motor vehicles, 13 or 4.5% were in the movement and storage of goods, 67 or 23.3% were in a hotel or restaurant, 3 or 1.0% were in the information industry, 4 or 1.4% were the insurance or financial industry, 11 or 3.8% were technical professionals or scientists, 17 or 5.9% were in education and 59 or 20.6% were in health care.

In 2000, there were 237 workers who commuted into the municipality and 703 workers who commuted away. The municipality is a net exporter of workers, with about 3.0 workers leaving the municipality for every one entering. Of the working population, 7.5% used public transportation to get to work, and 73% used a private car.

== Religion ==
From the 2000 census, 2,138 or 85.6% were Roman Catholic, while 125 or 5.0% belonged to the Swiss Reformed Church. Of the rest of the population, there were 8 members of an Orthodox church (or about 0.32% of the population), there were 4 individuals (or about 0.16% of the population) who belonged to the Christian Catholic Church, and there were 13 individuals (or about 0.52% of the population) who belonged to another Christian church. There were 11 (or about 0.44% of the population) who were Islamic. There was 1 person who was Buddhist and 1 individual who belonged to another church. 103 (or about 4.12% of the population) belonged to no church, are agnostic or atheist, and 99 individuals (or about 3.96% of the population) did not answer the question.

== Education ==
In Chamoson about 818 or (32.8%) of the population have completed non-mandatory upper secondary education, and 231 or (9.3%) have completed additional higher education (either university or a Fachhochschule). Of the 231 who completed tertiary schooling, 64.1% were Swiss men, 29.0% were Swiss women, 3.0% were non-Swiss men and 3.9% were non-Swiss women.

As of 2000, there was one student in Chamoson who came from another municipality, while 177 residents attended schools outside the municipality.

Chamoson is home to the Bibliothèque communale et scolaire library. The library has (as of 2008) 9,414 books or other media, and loaned out 30,393 items in the same year. It was open a total of 93 days with average of 6.5 hours per week during that year.
