= Nendaz =

- Municipality
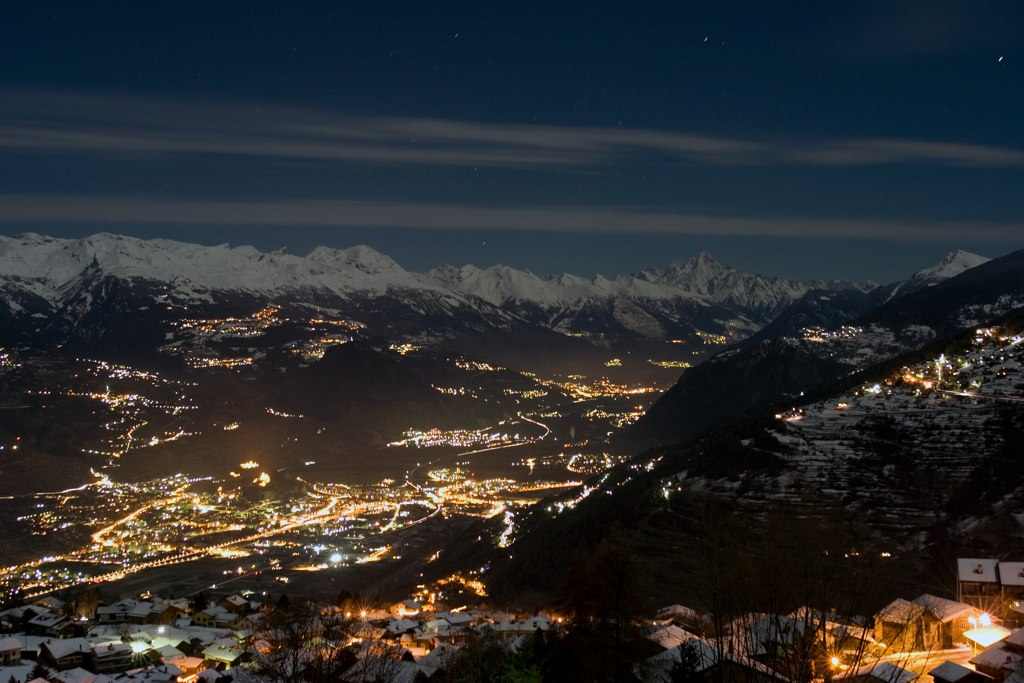

- Flag Coat of arms
- Location of Nendaz
- Location within Switzerland Location within Canton of Valais
- Coordinates: 46°11′N 7°18′E
- Country: Switzerland
- Canton: Valais
- District: Conthey

Government
  - Mayor: Frédéric Fragnière

Area
  - Total: 85.9 km^{2} (33.2 sq mi)

Population (December 2002)
  - Total: 5,408
  - Density: 63.0/km^{2} (163/sq mi)
- Time zone: UTC+01:00 (CET)
  - Summer (DST): UTC+02:00 (CEST)
- Postal code: 1997 (Haute-Nendaz)
- SFOS number: 6024
- ISO 3166 code: CH-VS
- Surrounded by: Ardon, Bagnes, Chamoson, Conthey, Hérémence, Isérables, Les Agettes, Riddes, Salins, Sion, Vétroz, Vex, Veysonnaz
- Website: www.nendaz.org

Nendaz is a municipality in the district of Conthey in the canton of Valais in Switzerland.

== History ==
Nendaz is first mentioned in 984 as Nenda. It was also known under its German name Neind though that name is no longer used.

== Geography ==
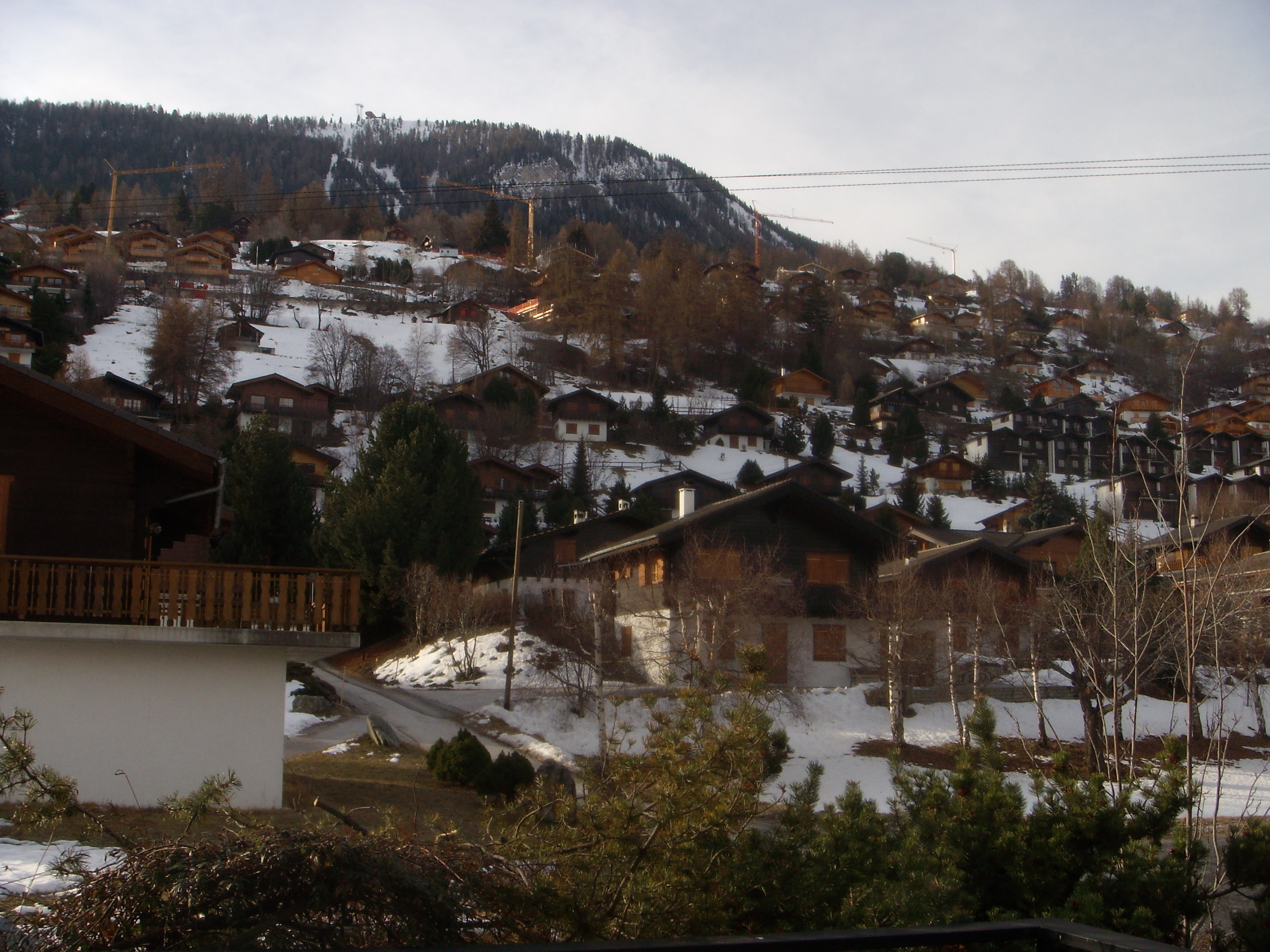
Haute Nendaz village

Aerial view (1968)

Nendaz has an area, as of 2011, of 85.9 square kilometers (33.2 mi^{2}). Of this area, 27.5% is used for agricultural purposes, while 31.2% is forested. Of the rest of the land, 4.2% is settled (buildings or roads) and 37.0% is unproductive land.

The municipality is located in the middle Valais, and stretches from the left bank of the Rhone river (490 m (1,610 ft)) up to the peak of the Rosablanche (3,336 m (10,945 ft)). It consists of about 15 villages and hamlets including Basse-Nendaz, Haute-Nendaz, Siviez (Super-Nendaz), Bieudron, Aproz, Baar, Brignon and Beuson.

== Coat of arms ==
The blazon of the municipal coat of arms is Azure, a Bend Gules between two Pomenranates.

== Demographics ==
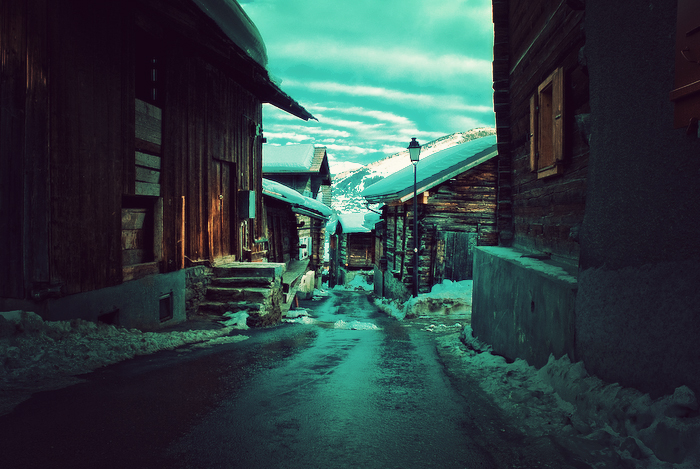
Houses in Nendaz municipality

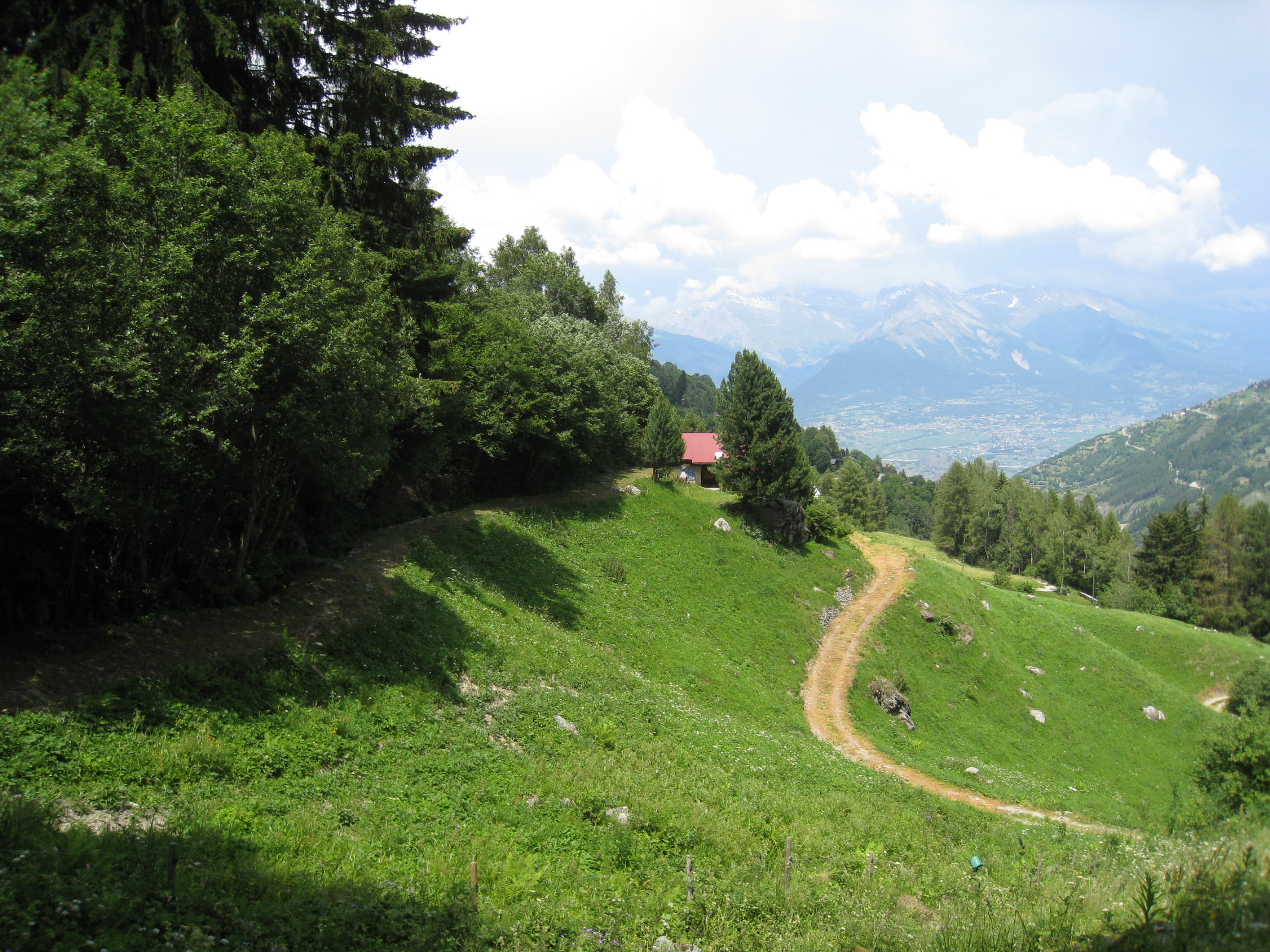
View of the Nendaz valley

Nendaz has a population (as of December 2020) of 6,805. As of 2008, 10.2% of the population are resident foreign nationals. Over the last 10 years (1999–2009 ) the population has changed at a rate of 10.6%. It has changed at a rate of 8.5% due to migration and at a rate of 1.1% due to births and deaths.

Most of the population (as of 2000) speaks French (5,029 or 94.0%) as their first language, German is the second most common (164 or 3.1%) and Portuguese is the third (45 or 0.8%). There are 23 people who speak Italian and 2 people who speak Romansh.

As of 2008, the gender distribution of the population was 50.4% male and 49.6% female. The population was made up of 2,635 Swiss men (44.2% of the population) and 368 (6.2%) non-Swiss men. There were 2,652 Swiss women (44.5%) and 304 (5.1%) non-Swiss women. Of the population in the municipality 3,577 or about 66.9% were born in Nendaz and lived there in 2000. There were 759 or 14.2% who were born in the same canton, while 439 or 8.2% were born somewhere else in Switzerland, and 399 or 7.5% were born outside of Switzerland.

The age distribution of the population (as of 2000) is children and teenagers (0–19 years old) make up 24.7% of the population, while adults (20–64 years old) make up 59.5% and seniors (over 64 years old) make up 15.8%.

As of 2000, there were 2,102 people who were single and never married in the municipality. There were 2,730 married individuals, 331 widows or widowers and 187 individuals who are divorced.

As of 2000, there were 2,035 private households in the municipality, and an average of 2.5 persons per household. There were 566 households that consist of only one person and 162 households with five or more people. Out of a total of 2,122 households that answered this question, 26.7% were households made up of just one person and there were 37 adults who lived with their parents. Of the rest of the households, there are 534 married couples without children, 761 married couples with children There were 114 single parents with a child or children. There were 23 households that were made up of unrelated people and 87 households that were made up of some sort of institution or another collective housing.

In 2000 there were 2,378 single family homes (or 74.1% of the total) out of a total of 3,211 inhabited buildings. There were 461 multi-family buildings (14.4%), along with 233 multi-purpose buildings that were mostly used for housing (7.3%) and 139 other use buildings (commercial or industrial) that also had some housing (4.3%).

In 2000, a total of 1,939 apartments (30.7% of the total) were permanently occupied, while 4,061 apartments (64.3%) were seasonally occupied and 320 apartments (5.1%) were empty. As of 2009, the construction rate of new housing units was 9.6 new units per 1000 residents. The vacancy rate for the municipality, in 2010, was 1.61%.

The historical population is given in the following chart:

== Politics ==
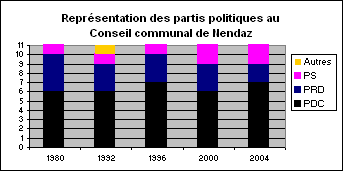
Party membership in the city council of Nendaz

In the 2007 federal election the most popular party was the CVP which received 42.83% of the vote. The next three most popular parties were the SP (22.13%), the FDP (17.91%) and the SVP (9.48%). In the federal election, a total of 2,664 votes were cast, and the voter turnout was 62.4%.

In the 2009 Conseil d'État/Staatsrat election a total of 2,387 votes were cast, of which 143 or about 6.0% were invalid. The voter participation was 57.3%, which is similar to the cantonal average of 54.67%. In the 2007 Swiss Council of States election a total of 2,636 votes were cast, of which 172 or about 6.5% were invalid. The voter participation was 61.8%, which is similar to the cantonal average of 59.88%.

== Economy ==
As of 2010, Nendaz had an unemployment rate of 4.8%. As of 2008, there were 303 people employed in the primary economic sector and about 145 businesses involved in this sector. 477 people were employed in the secondary sector and there were 55 businesses in this sector. 988 people were employed in the tertiary sector, with 204 businesses in this sector. There were 2,530 residents of the municipality who were employed in some capacity, of which females made up 40.7% of the workforce.

In 2008 the total number of full-time equivalent jobs was 1,399. The number of jobs in the primary sector was 169, of which 149 were in agriculture and 20 were in forestry or lumber production. The number of jobs in the secondary sector was 456 of which 263 or (57.7%) were in manufacturing and 186 (40.8%) were in construction. The number of jobs in the tertiary sector was 774. In the tertiary sector; 142 or 18.3% were in wholesale or retail sales or the repair of motor vehicles, 79 or 10.2% were in the movement and storage of goods, 190 or 24.5% were in a hotel or restaurant, 2 or 0.3% were in the information industry, 29 or 3.7% were the insurance or financial industry, 82 or 10.6% were technical professionals or scientists, 55 or 7.1% were in education and 59 or 7.6% were in health care.

In 2000, there were 305 workers who commuted into the municipality and 1,283 workers who commuted away. The municipality is a net exporter of workers, with about 4.2 workers leaving the municipality for every one entering. Of the working population, 9.8% used public transportation to get to work, and 73.2% used a private car.

== Religion ==
From the 2000 census, 4,609 or 86.1% were Roman Catholic, while 200 or 3.7% belonged to the Swiss Reformed Church. Of the rest of the population, there were 37 members of an Orthodox church (or about 0.69% of the population), there was 1 individual who belongs to the Christian Catholic Church, and there were 38 individuals (or about 0.71% of the population) who belonged to another Christian church. There was 1 individual who was Jewish, and 19 (or about 0.36% of the population) who were Islamic. There were 3 individuals who were Buddhist, 3 individuals who were Hindu and 8 individuals who belonged to another church. 213 (or about 3.98% of the population) belonged to no church, are agnostic or atheist, and 236 individuals (or about 4.41% of the population) did not answer the question.

== Education ==
In Nendaz about 1,845 or (34.5%) of the population have completed non-mandatory upper secondary education, and 420 or (7.9%) have completed additional higher education (either university or a Fachhochschule). Of the 420 who completed tertiary schooling, 63.3% were Swiss men, 27.6% were Swiss women, 5.2% were non-Swiss men and 3.8% were non-Swiss women.

As of 2000, there were 23 students in Nendaz who came from another municipality, while 216 residents attended schools outside the municipality.
