= Conthey District =

Coordinates: 46°12′17″N 7°16′42″E

Conthey District de Conthey
- District
- Flag Coat of arms
- Country: Switzerland
- Canton: Valais
- Capital: Conthey

Area
  - Total: 234.2 km^{2} (90.4 sq mi)

Population (2020)
  - Total: 29,424
  - Density: 125.6/km^{2} (325.4/sq mi)
- Time zone: UTC+1 (CET)
  - Summer (DST): UTC+2 (CEST)

The district of Conthey (French: District de Conthey, German: Bezirk Gundis) is an administrative district in the canton of Valais, Switzerland. It has a population of 29,424 (as of 31 December 2020).

The Conthey district was created as the 13th district of the Valais as the canton joined the restored Swiss Confederacy in 1815, accounting for the thirteen stars in the coat of arms of Valais.

== Municipalities ==
It contains the following municipalities:

Municipality	Population (31 December 2020)	Area km^{2}
Ardon	3,379	20.35
Chamoson	3,986	32.47
Conthey	8,857	84.98
Nendaz	6,805	86.01
Vétroz	6,397	10.45
Total	29,424	234.26

== Flag and coat of arms ==
The blazon of the municipal flag and coat of arms is Argent, two Lions rampant combatant Gules holding together a Sword Or inverted.

== Demographics ==
Conthey has a population (as of December 2020) of 29,424. Most of the population (as of 2000) speaks French (18,197 or 90.6%) as their first language, German is the second most common (533 or 2.7%) and Portuguese is the third (485 or 2.4%). There are 266 people who speak Italian and 4 people who speak Romansh.

As of 2008, the gender distribution of the population was 49.6% male and 50.4% female. The population was made up of 9,234 Swiss men (39.3% of the population) and 2,426 (10.3%) non-Swiss men. There were 9,769 Swiss women (41.6%) and 2,066 (8.8%) non-Swiss women. Of the population in the district 9,952 or about 49.5% were born in Conthey and lived there in 2000. There were 4,710 or 23.4% who were born in the same canton, while 1,848 or 9.2% were born somewhere else in Switzerland, and 2,845 or 14.2% were born outside of Switzerland.

As of 2000, there were 7,876 people who were single and never married in the district. There were 10,191 married individuals, 1,227 widows or widowers and 800 individuals who are divorced.

There were 2,070 households that consist of only one person and 565 households with five or more people. Out of a total of 7,937 households that answered this question, 26.1% were households made up of just one person and there were 113 adults who lived with their parents. Of the rest of the households, there are 2,100 married couples without children, 2,908 married couples with children There were 456 single parents with a child or children. There were 86 households that were made up of unrelated people and 204 households that were made up of some sort of institution or another collective housing.

The historical population is given in the following chart:

== Politics ==
In the 2007 federal election the most popular party was the CVP which received 36.42% of the vote. The next three most popular parties were the FDP (27.87%), the SP (14.67%) and the SVP (12.75%). In the federal election, a total of 9,538 votes were cast, and the voter turnout was 63.0%.

In the 2009 Conseil d'État/Staatsrat election a total of 8,362 votes were cast, of which 552 or about 6.6% were invalid. The voter participation was 55.5%, which is similar to the cantonal average of 54.67%.

In the 2007 Swiss Council of States election a total of 9,418 votes were cast, of which 609 or about 6.5% were invalid. The voter participation was 62.5%, which is similar to the cantonal average of 59.88%.

== Religion ==
From the 2000 census, 16,802 or 83.6% were Roman Catholic, while 856 or 4.3% belonged to the Swiss Reformed Church. Of the rest of the population, there were 96 members of an Orthodox church (or about 0.48% of the population), there were 16 individuals (or about 0.08% of the population) who belonged to the Christian Catholic Church, and there were 207 individuals (or about 1.03% of the population) who belonged to another Christian church. There were 6 individuals (or about 0.03% of the population) who were Jewish, and 506 (or about 2.52% of the population) who were Islamic. There were 27 individuals who were Buddhist, 16 individuals who were Hindu and 20 individuals who belonged to another church. 709 (or about 3.53% of the population) belonged to no church, are agnostic or atheist, and 934 individuals (or about 4.65% of the population) did not answer the question.

== Education ==
In Conthey about 6,685 or (33.3%) of the population have completed non-mandatory upper secondary education, and 1,858 or (9.2%) have completed additional higher education (either University or a Fachhochschule). Of the 1,858 who completed tertiary schooling, 63.9% were Swiss men, 27.3% were Swiss women, 5.4% were non-Swiss men and 3.4% were non-Swiss women.
