= Ardon, Switzerland =

Ardon
- Municipality
- Ardon village from Nendaz

- Flag Coat of arms
- Location of Ardon
- Location within Switzerland Location within Canton of Valais
- Coordinates: 46°12′N 7°15′E
- Country: Switzerland
- Canton: Valais
- District: Conthey

Government
  - Mayor: Pierre-Marie Broccard

Area
  - Total: 20.4 km^{2} (7.9 sq mi)
- Elevation: 503 m (1,650 ft)

Population (December 2002)
  - Total: 2,306
  - Density: 113/km^{2} (293/sq mi)
- Time zone: UTC+01:00 (CET)
  - Summer (DST): UTC+02:00 (CEST)
- Postal code: 1957
- SFOS number: 6021
- ISO 3166 code: CH-VS
- Surrounded by: Chamoson, Conthey, Nendaz, Vétroz
- Website: www.ardon.ch

Ardon (French pronunciation: [aʁdɔ̃]) is a municipality in the district of Conthey in the canton of Valais in Switzerland.

== History ==
Historic aerial photograph by Werner Friedli from 1949

Ardon is first mentioned at the end of the 11th Century as Ardunum. In 1179 it was mentioned as Ardun.

== Geography ==
Lizerne river gorge near Ardon

Ardon has an area, as of 2009, of 20.4 square kilometers (7.9 mi^{2}). Of this area, 4.15 km^{2} (1.60 mi^{2}) or 20.4% is used for agricultural purposes, while 6.41 km^{2} (2.47 mi^{2}) or 31.5% is forested. Of the rest of the land, 1.33 km^{2} (0.51 mi^{2}) or 6.5% is settled (buildings or roads), 0.17 km^{2} (0.066 mi^{2}) or 0.8% is either rivers or lakes and 8.31 km^{2} (3.21 mi^{2}) or 40.8% is unproductive land.

Of the built up area, housing and buildings made up 2.8% and transportation infrastructure made up 2.6%. Out of the forested land, 25.7% of the total land area is heavily forested and 2.4% is covered with orchards or small clusters of trees. Of the agricultural land, 1.3% is used for growing crops, while 13.8% is used for orchards or vine crops and 4.6% is used for alpine pastures. All the water in the municipality is flowing water. Of the unproductive areas, 8.6% is unproductive vegetation and 32.2% is too rocky for vegetation.

The municipality is located on the alluvial fan of the Lizerne, to the right of the Rhone river. It is about 10 km (6.2 mi) from Sion.

== Coat of arms ==
The blazon of the municipal coat of arms is Gules, a Key Or and a Key Argent in saltire.

== Demographics ==
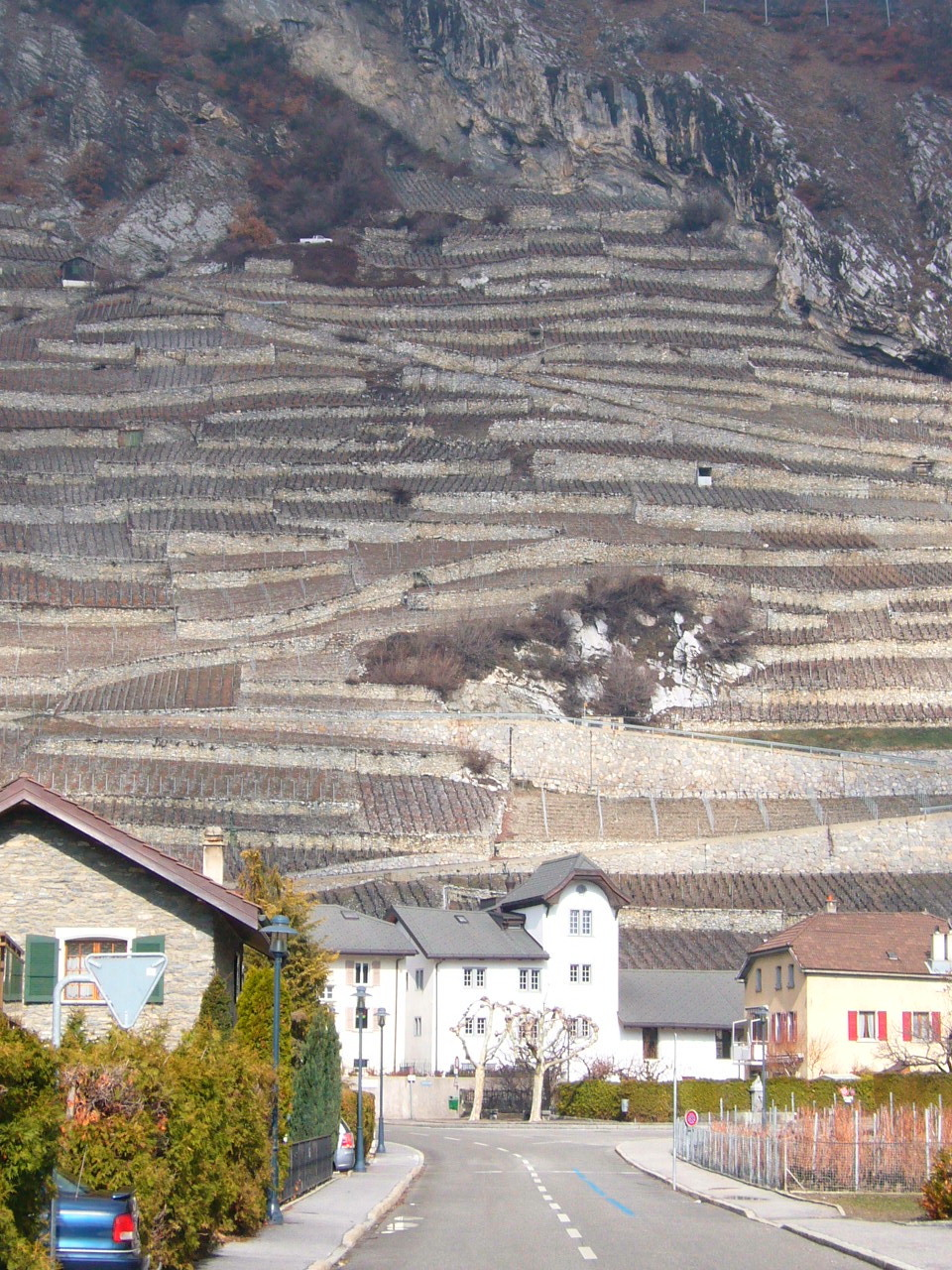
Ardon village

Ardon has a population (as of December 2020) of 3,379. As of 2008, 32.7% of the population are resident foreign nationals. Over the last 10 years (1999–2009 ) the population has changed at a rate of 10.3%. It has changed at a rate of 11.7% due to migration and at a rate of 3.8% due to births and deaths.

Most of the population (as of 2000) speaks French (1,859 or 81.0%) as their first language, Portuguese is the second most common (150 or 6.5%) and German is the third (59 or 2.6%). There are 41 people who speak Italian.

As of 2008, the gender distribution of the population was 49.5% male and 50.5% female. The population was made up of 807 Swiss men (31.6% of the population) and 458 (17.9%) non-Swiss men. There were 892 Swiss women (34.9%) and 396 (15.5%) non-Swiss women. Of the population in the municipality 839 or about 36.6% were born in Ardon and lived there in 2000. There were 554 or 24.1% who were born in the same canton, while 186 or 8.1% were born somewhere else in Switzerland, and 564 or 24.6% were born outside of Switzerland.

The age distribution of the population (as of 2000) is children and teenagers (0–19 years old) make up 26.4% of the population, while adults (20–64 years old) make up 61.1% and seniors (over 64 years old) make up 12.5%.

As of 2000, there were 972 people who were single and never married in the municipality. There were 1,126 married individuals, 115 widows or widowers and 82 individuals who are divorced.

As of 2000 the average number of residents per living room was 0.63 which is about equal to the cantonal average of 0.63 per room. In this case, a room is defined as space of a housing unit of at least 4 m^{2} (43 sq ft) as normal bedrooms, dining rooms, living rooms, kitchens and habitable cellars and attics. About 59.7% of the total households were owner occupied, or in other words did not pay rent (though they may have a mortgage or a rent-to-own agreement). As of 2000, there were 847 private households in the municipality, and an average of 2.5 persons per household.

There were 220 households that consist of only one person and 70 households with five or more people. Out of a total of 873 households that answered this question, 25.2% were households made up of just one person and there were 9 adults who lived with their parents. Of the rest of the households, there are 215 married couples without children, 333 married couples with children There were 60 single parents with a child or children. There were 10 households that were made up of unrelated people and 26 households that were made up of some sort of institution or another collective housing.

In 2000 there were 351 single family homes (or 65.1% of the total) out of a total of 539 inhabited buildings. There were 115 multi-family buildings (21.3%), along with 45 multi-purpose buildings that were mostly used for housing (8.3%) and 28 other use buildings (commercial or industrial) that also had some housing (5.2%).

In 2000, a total of 764 apartments (80.9% of the total) were permanently occupied, while 150 apartments (15.9%) were seasonally occupied and 30 apartments (3.2%) were empty. As of 2009, the construction rate of new housing units was 7.8 new units per 1000 residents. The vacancy rate for the municipality, in 2010, was 0.09%.

The historical population is given in the following chart:

== Politics ==
In the 2007 federal election the most popular party was the FDP which received 40.59% of the vote. The next three most popular parties were the CVP (32.99%), the SP (10.72%) and the SVP (10.3%). In the federal election, a total of 893 votes were cast, and the voter turnout was 64.1%.

In the 2009 Conseil d'État/Staatsrat election a total of 725 votes were cast, of which 50 or about 6.9% were invalid. The voter participation was 52.1%, which is similar to the cantonal average of 54.67%. In the 2007 Swiss Council of States election a total of 864 votes were cast, of which 70 or about 8.1% were invalid. The voter participation was 63.0%, which is similar to the cantonal average of 59.88%.

== Economy ==
As of 2010, Ardon had an unemployment rate of 6.9%. As of 2008, there were 99 people employed in the primary economic sector and about 40 businesses involved in this sector. 136 people were employed in the secondary sector and there were 23 businesses in this sector. 320 people were employed in the tertiary sector, with 66 businesses in this sector. There were 1,076 residents of the municipality who were employed in some capacity, of which females made up 42.1% of the workforce.

In 2008 the total number of full-time equivalent jobs was 445. The number of jobs in the primary sector was 61, all of which were in agriculture. The number of jobs in the secondary sector was 127 of which 109 or (85.8%) were in manufacturing and 17 (13.4%) were in construction. The number of jobs in the tertiary sector was 257. In the tertiary sector; 129 or 50.2% were in wholesale or retail sales or the repair of motor vehicles, 8 or 3.1% were in the movement and storage of goods, 24 or 9.3% were in a hotel or restaurant, 5 or 1.9% were in the information industry, 8 or 3.1% were the insurance or financial industry, 12 or 4.7% were technical professionals or scientists, 19 or 7.4% were in education and 19 or 7.4% were in health care.

In 2000, there were 306 workers who commuted into the municipality and 743 workers who commuted away. The municipality is a net exporter of workers, with about 2.4 workers leaving the municipality for every one entering. Of the working population, 12.4% used public transportation to get to work, and 68.7% used a private car.

== Religion ==
From the 2000 census, 1,762 or 76.8% were Roman Catholic, while 82 or 3.6% belonged to the Swiss Reformed Church. Of the rest of the population, there were 8 members of an Orthodox church (or about 0.35% of the population), there were 2 individuals (or about 0.09% of the population) who belonged to the Christian Catholic Church, and there were 14 individuals (or about 0.61% of the population) who belonged to another Christian church. There were 144 (or about 6.27% of the population) who were Islamic. There were 11 individuals who were Buddhist, 9 individuals who were Hindu and 3 individuals who belonged to another church. 76 (or about 3.31% of the population) belonged to no church, are agnostic or atheist, and 191 individuals (or about 8.32% of the population) did not answer the question.

== Education ==
In Ardon about 675 or (29.4%) of the population have completed non-mandatory upper secondary education, and 210 or (9.2%) have completed additional higher education (either university or a Fachhochschule). Of the 210 who completed tertiary schooling, 62.4% were Swiss men, 24.8% were Swiss women, 8.6% were non-Swiss men and 4.3% were non-Swiss women.

As of 2000, there were 2 students in Ardon who came from another municipality, while 167 residents attended schools outside the municipality.

Ardon is home to the Bibliothèque communale et scolaire library. The library has (as of 2008) 9,000 books or other media, and loaned out 9,073 items in the same year. It was open a total of 150 days with average of 6 hours per week during that year.
