= Don De Grazia =

American academic and writer (1968–2024)

Don Gennaro De Grazia (January 3, 1968 – June 13, 2024) was an American academic who was Professor of Fiction Writing at Columbia College in Chicago, and the author of the novel American Skin. Prior to publishing his first novel, he worked as a factory worker, bouncer and soldier. He lived and worked in Chicago until his death on June 13, 2024, at the age of 56.

American Skin was originally published in the UK in 1998 by Jonathan Cape and in 1999 by Scribner.
