= Sebastian de Grazia =

American philosopher (1917–2000)

Sebastian de Grazia (August 11, 1917 – December 31, 2000) was an American philosopher who was Professor of Political Philosophy at Rutgers University. He received the 1990 Pulitzer Prize for Biography or Autobiography for his 1989 book Machiavelli in Hell.

== Biography ==
Born in Chicago, he received his bachelor's degree and a doctorate in political science from the University of Chicago. During World War II he served in the Office of Strategic Services, predecessor to the Central Intelligence Agency, as an analyst. From 1962 to 1988 he taught political philosophy at Rutgers University. He is also the author of The Political Community (1948), Errors of Psychotherapy (1952), Of Time, Work, and Leisure (1962), and A Country with No Name (1997).

== Leisure ==
De Grazia has been described as the "father of leisure". His book Of Time, Work, and Leisure (1962) puts forward the idea that traditionally leisure was not a matter of recreation as much as of contemplation, of expanding one's awareness and understanding of the world, and that the social context of this understanding of leisure has to a large extent been lost, and with it the notion of leisure being the pursuit of philosophy.
