= Schwarzer See =

Schwarzer See (literally "Black Lake") may refer to:

in Brandenburg, Germany

- Schwarzer See (Rheinsberg)

in Mecklenburg-Vorpommern, Germany

- Schwarzer See (Granitz)
- Schwarzer See (Mildenitz)
- Schwarzer See (Schlemmin)
- Schwarzer See (Schwarz)
- Schwarzer See (Zickhusen)

== See also ==
- Schwarzsee (disambiguation)
- Black Lake (disambiguation)
