= Schwarzsee (disambiguation) =

Schwarzsee is a lake in the canton of Fribourg, Switzerland.

Schwarzsee may also refer to:

== Austria ==
- Schwarzsee (Kitzbühel), a moor lake in Tyrol
- Schwarzsee (Zillertaler Alpen), a lake in Tyrol

== Switzerland ==
- Schwarzsee (Blatten), a lake in the canton of Valais
- Schwarzsee (Davos), a lake at Davos-Laret in the Grisons
- Schwarzsee (Oberems), a lake in the canton of Valais
- Schwarzsee (Pizol), a lake on the Pizol, canton of St. Gallen
- Schwarzsee (Zermatt), a lake above Zermatt, Valais
- Lac de Tracouet (also Lac Noir), a lake above Nendaz, Valais

== See also ==
- Black Lake (disambiguation)
- Schwarzer See (disambiguation)
