= Rheinsberg Lake Region =

Coordinates: 53°09′04″N 13°01′34″E

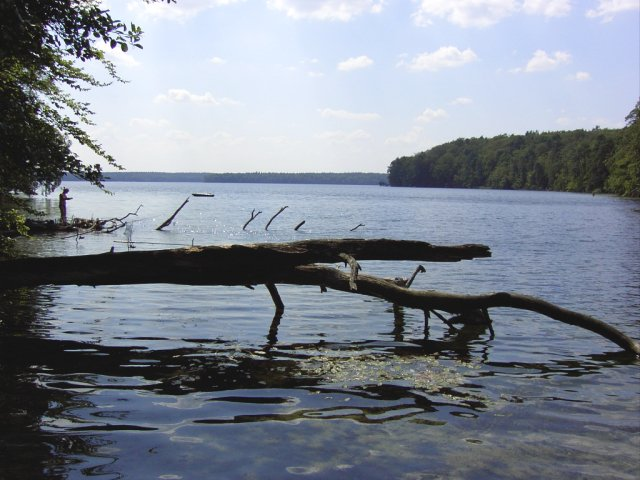
Lake Stechlin, best-known lake in the Rheinsberg Lake Region

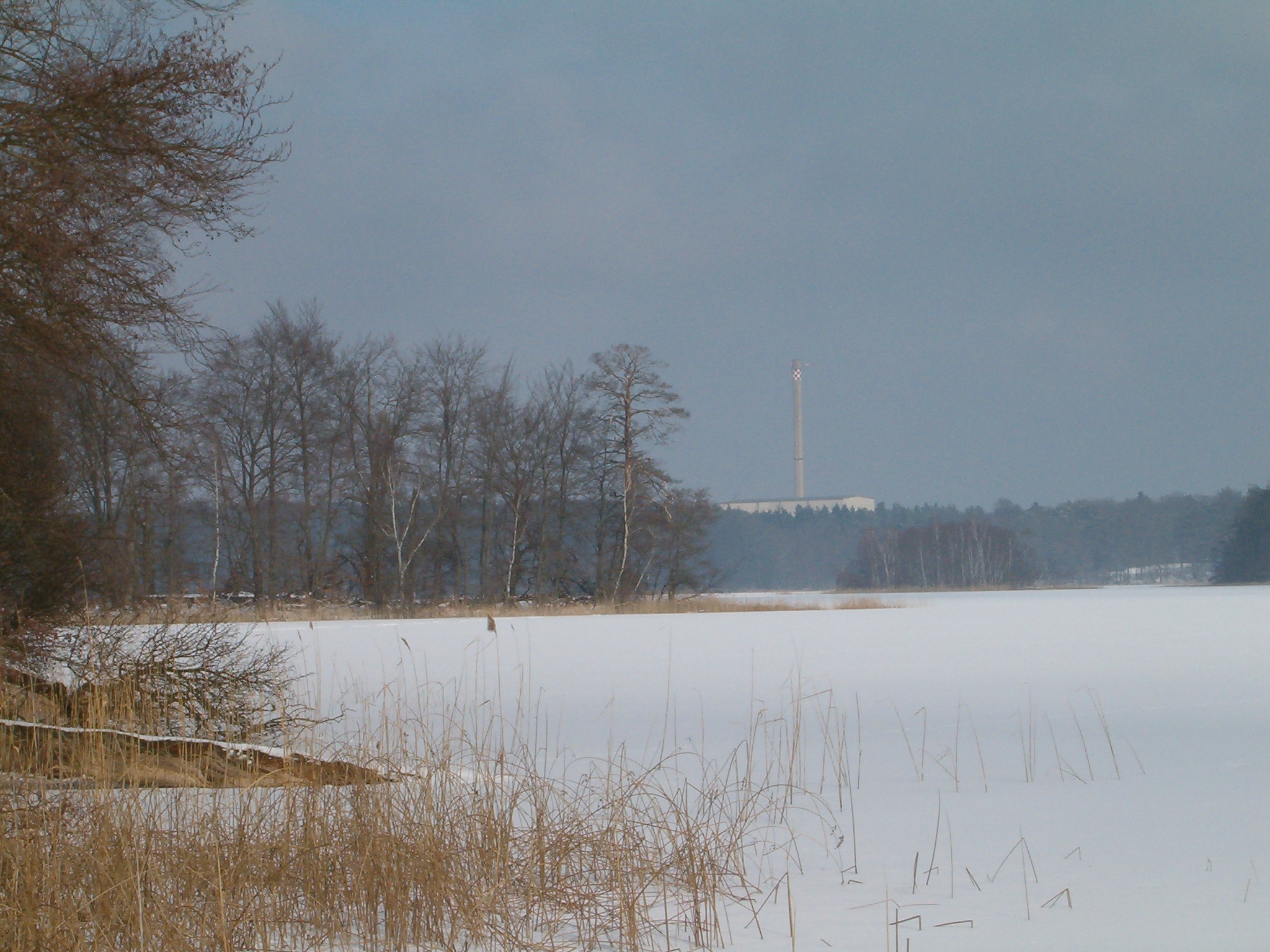
The Nehmitzsee in winter

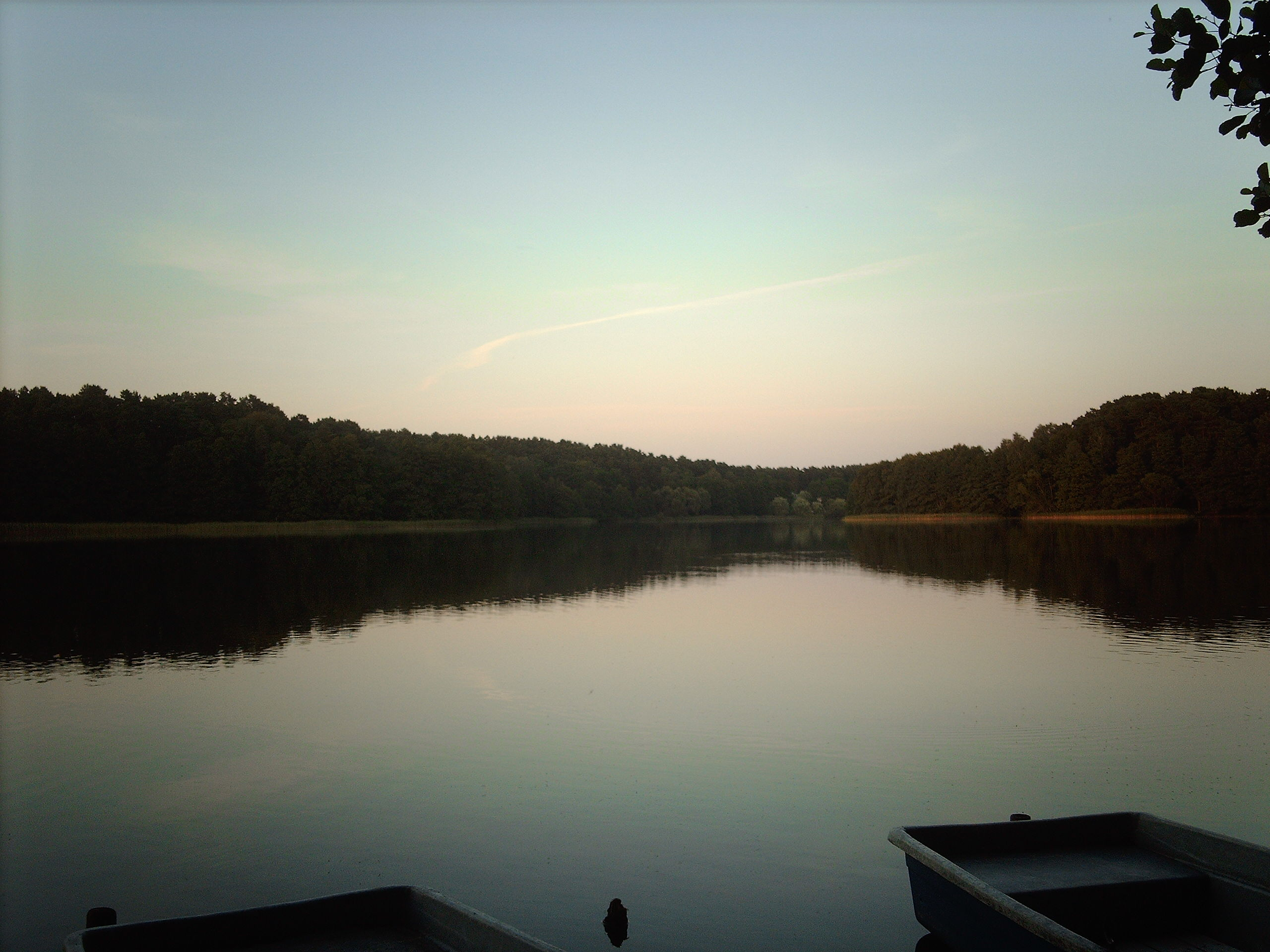
The Roofensee near Menz

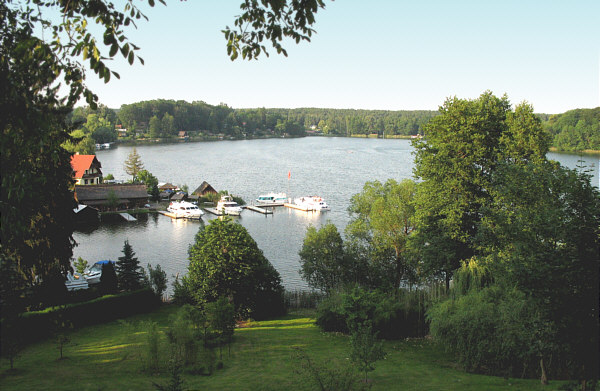
The Schwarzer See, also called the Kleiner Zechliner See

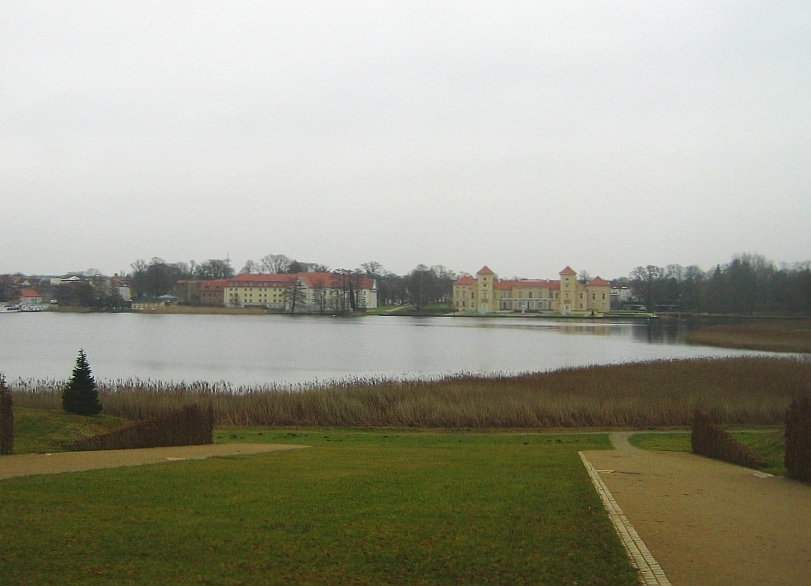
The Grienericksee and Rheinsberg Palace

The Rheinsberg Lake Region (German: Rheinsberger Seengebiet) with its many great and small lakes, lies in the richly-varied, gently rolling, forested countryside between the villages of Rheinsberg, Menz and Fürstenberg/Havel in the north German state of Brandenburg. It lies just to the south of the Neustrelitz Little Lakes Region, but has no natural link to the waterbodies to the north. However, the Rheinsberg Lake Region is linked to the Neustrelitz lakes via the Wolfsbruch Canal and Lock, the Müritz-Havel Waterway and the Upper Havel Waterway. It drains southwards to the River Havel through the Rhin and is bounded by Ruppin Switzerland to the south. The overwhelming part of the region belongs to the Stechlin-Ruppiner Land Nature Park. The Stechlin Nature Reserve, created in 1938, is well known.

== Important lakes ==
The best-known lake in the Rheinsberg Lake Region is Lake Stechlin (Stechlinsee). Other large lakes in the region are the: Braminsee, Nehmitzsee, Großer Prebelowsee, Rheinsberger See, Roofensee, Schwarzer See, Tietzowsee, Großer Wummsee, Großer Zechliner See and Zootzensee.

== Rheinsberg and Zechlin Waters ==
In 1876-1881 the chains of lakes within the Rheinsberg Lake Region known as the Rheinsberg and Zechlin Waters (Rheinsberger Gewässer and Zechliner Gewässer), stretching for about 21 kilometres (13 mi), were made navigable and connected to the Müritz-Havel Waterway via the Wolfsbruch Lock.

The Rheinsberg Waters branch into the lake of Kleiner Pälitzsee from the Müritz-Havel Waterway. At the Pälitz Bridge – the former border between Mecklenburg-Strelitz and Prussia, the present border between the states of Mecklenburg-Vorpommern and Brandenburg – a lock canal, not quite 3 kilometres (2 mi) long, begins with the Wolfsbruch Lock (known in GDR days as the Hütten Canal, but from 1998 as the Wolfsbruch Canal (Wolfsbrucher Kanal).) After that com the Großer Prebelowsee lake, the short Prebelow Canal, the Tietzowsee lake, the 900-metre (3,000 ft) long Hütten Canal (also called the Jagow Canal), the Schlabornsee and the 1.5 kilometre long Schlaborn Canal, the Große Rheinsberger See and the 800-metre (2,600 ft) long Rheinsberg Canal as well as the Grienericksee before reaching its southern end at kilometre marker 13.25. The Rheinsberg Waters also include the 3 kilometre long Dollgow Canal and Dollgowsee that branch off the Schlabornsee towards the southwest. Until 1990 the 1.5-kilometre (0.93 mi) long Bikow Canal and Bikowsee that branched off the Schlabornsee towards the east were also counted as part of the Rheinsberg Waters.

The Zechlin Waters lead from the Tietzowsee towards the west with the short Zootzen Canal, the Zootzensee lake, the 1.8-kilometre (1.1 mi) long Repent Canal, the Großer Zechliner See, the short Zechlin Canal and the Schwarzer See (also Kleiner Zechliner See) to its southwestern end after 8.49 kilometres (5.28 mi).

The Rheinsberg and Zechlin Waters were Prussian waterbodies; only from 1921 to 1924 were they Reich Waterways. From 1990 they are Federal Waterways (Bundeswasserstraßen) and have belonged since 1998 to the so-called special inland waterways of the Federation. The Eberswalde Water and Shipping Authority (Wasser- und Schifffahrtsamt Eberswalde) is responsible for them.

== Geology ==
The Rheinsberg Lake Region belongs, in terms of its historical formation, to the Mecklenburg Lake District.

The region lies between the moraines of the Frankfurt Series and the Pomeranian Stage of the Weichselian glaciation and was formed during that ice age about 12,000 years ago in the meltwater valleys and sandurs of the Pomeranian. It has relatively high levels of relief for Brandenburg. There are flat sandur areas, undulating ground moraines and elongated end moraines. In between them lie the tunnel valley lakes and kettle lakes. These lakes do not generally have natural surface head and tailwaters. They were later linked by canals.

== Climate ==
Climatically the region differs from the surrounding area due to its relief and its many lakes. There are many pockets of cold air (Kaltluftinseln). The cold air collects in hollows and is generally colder than that of the surrounding area. There are frequent early and late frosts. The average precipitation is relatively high at 563 millimetres (22.2 in) (Rheinsberg). A high humidity and low average summer temperatures characterise the climate.

== Vegetation ==
The forests in this region are very varied. Its natural vegetation would be beech and beech-sessile oak woods. Today however it is dominated by Scots Pine and mixed pine woods. In smaller depressions and hollows today there are kettle bogs.

== Literature ==
The region became well-known through its coverage in the book Wanderungen durch die Mark Brandenburg ("Walks through the March of Brandenburg") by the eminent German writer, Theodor Fontane.

== Sources ==
- H.-J. Uhlemann, Berlin und die Märkischen Wasserstraßen, DSV-Verlag Hamburg 1994
