= Schwarzsee (Oberems) =

Lake in Valais, Switzerland

- Location within Canton of Valais Location within Switzerland Location within Alps
- Interactive map of Schwarzsee
- Location: Oberems, Valais
- Coordinates: 46°14′34″N 7°40′2″E
- Basin countries: Switzerland
- Surface area: 1.4 ha (3.5 acres)
- Surface elevation: 2,611 m (8,566 ft)

Schwarzsee is a mountain lake in the canton of Valais, Switzerland. It is located at an elevation of 2,611 m, below Bella Tola (3,025 m) and Brunnethorn (2,952 m), above the Turtmanntal. It is part of the municipality of Oberems.
