= Eduard Knoblauch =

German architect

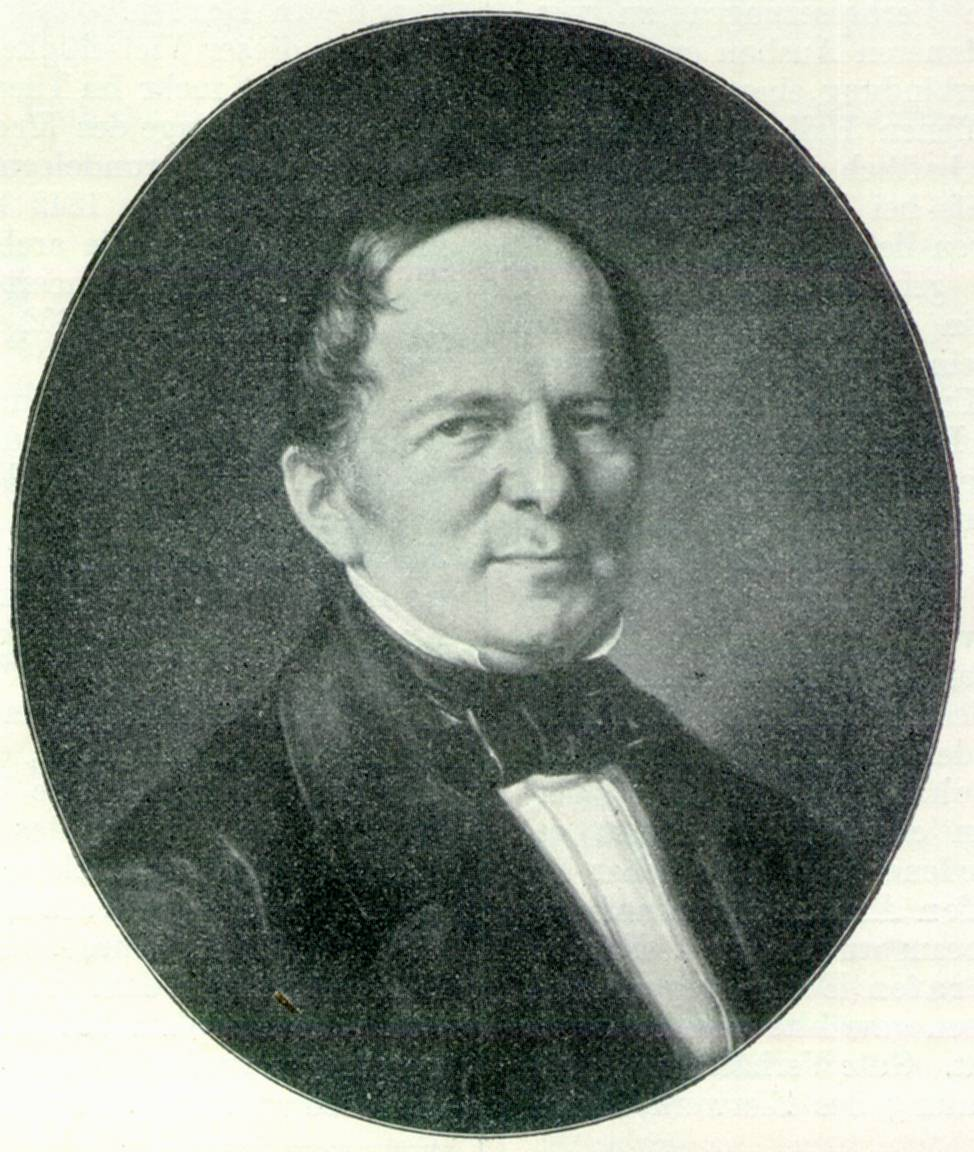
Eduard Knoblauch, c.1850

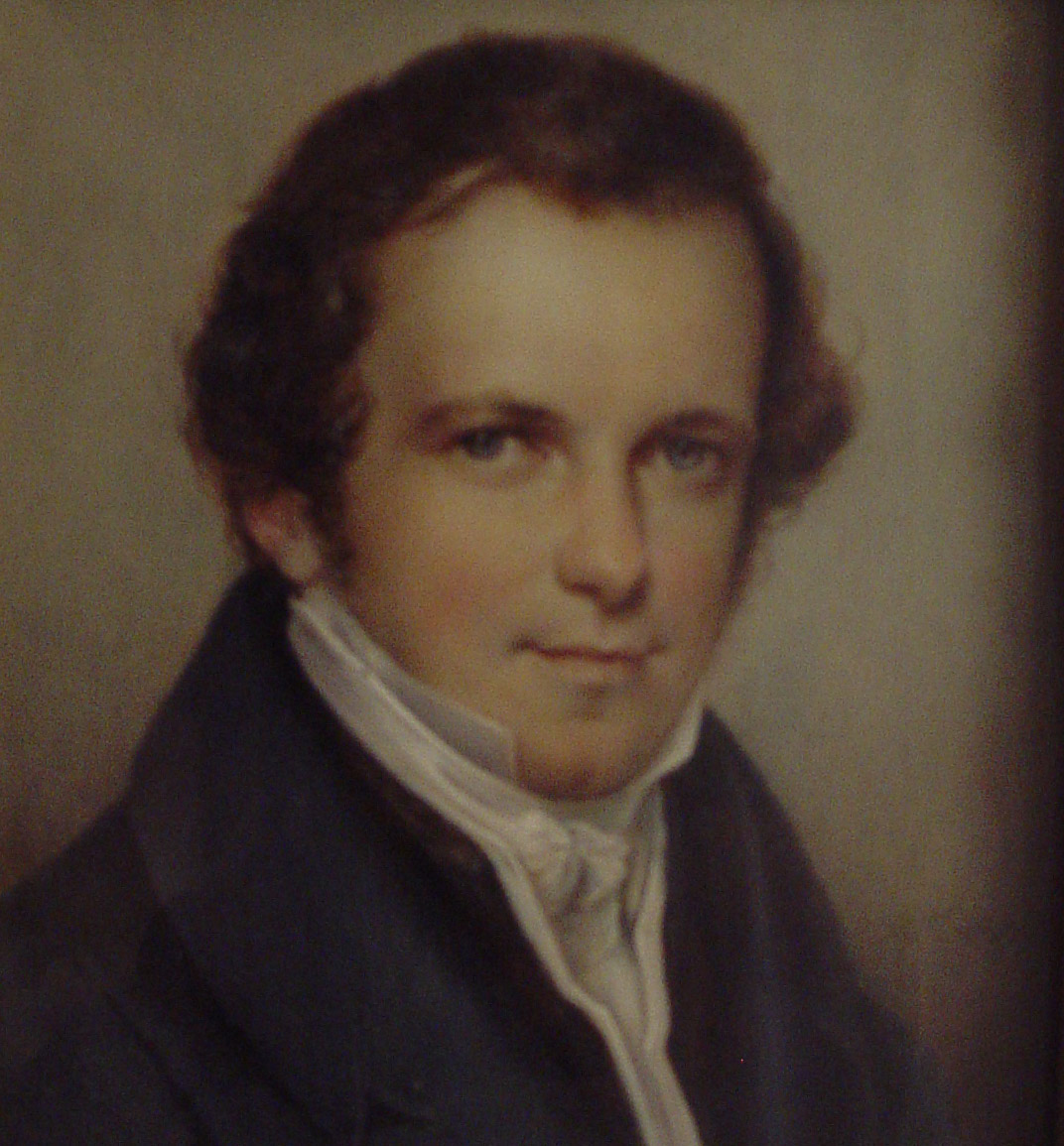
Eduard Knoblauch, c.1820

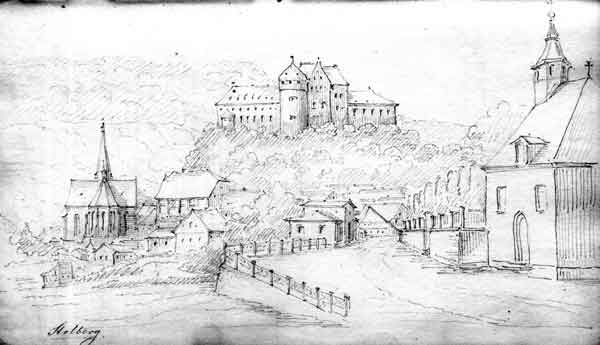
Sketch of Stolberg (Harz) by Eduard Knoblauch, c. 1830

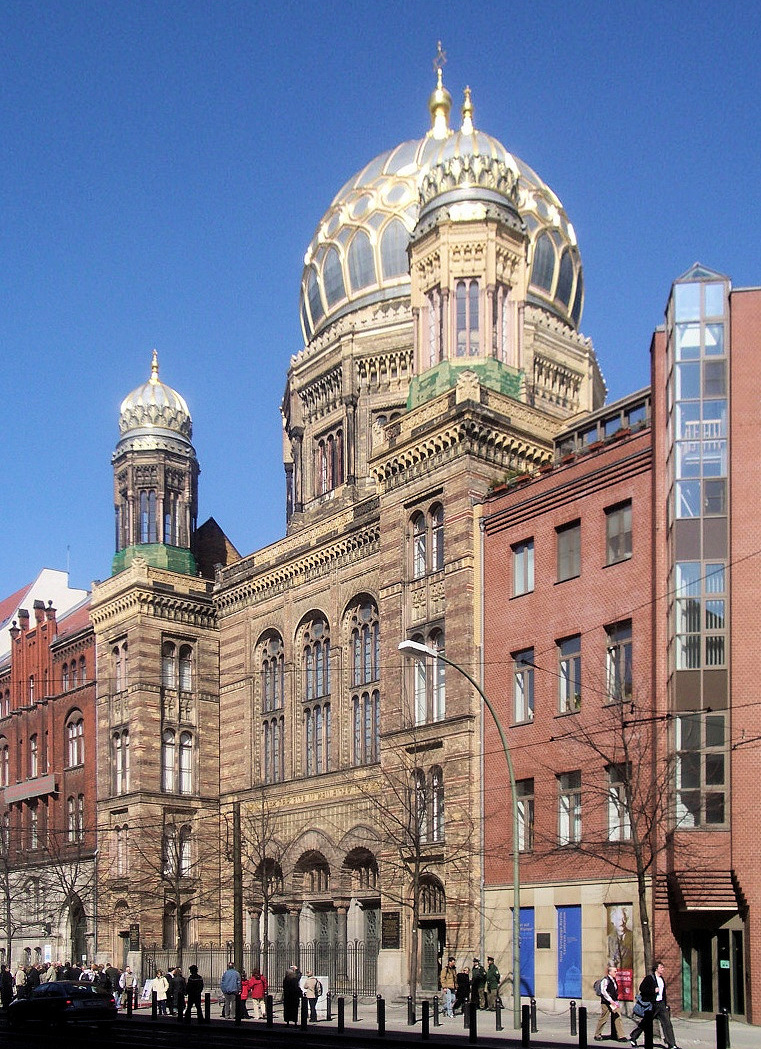
2005 Photo of Neue Synagoge by Eduard Knoblauch, built 1859-1866

(Carl Heinrich) Eduard Knoblauch (born 25 September 1801 in Berlin; died 29 May 1865 in Berlin) was a German architect.

Eduard Knoblauch was born in his family's house on Poststraße 23 in the Nikolaiviertel neighborhood in Berlin, Germany. He studied at the Berliner Bauakademie under Karl Friedrich Schinkel successfully passing a series of examinations (1818 Feldmesserprüfung, 1822 Kondukteurprüfung, 1828 Baumeisterprüfung). He was one of the co-founders of the Architektenvereins (architects' society) in Berlin in 1824 and was on its executive board until 1862. He edited the Zeitschrift für Bauwesen (Journal for Building) for many years. After the conclusion of his studies in 1828 he traveled in Germany and Holland. Together with fellow architect Friedrich August Stüler he traveled in 1829/1830 to France, Switzerland and Italy. He married Julie Verhuven in 1831 and had with her two sons and four daughters. He and his wife are buried in the St. Marien- und St. Nikolai Cemetery in Berlin.

== Works ==
His buildings include:

- Russische Botschaft (Russian Embassy) (renovation), 1840-41 [destroyed 1945], Berlin, Germany
- Schloss Görlsdorf, 1843 [destroyed 1945], Angermünde, Germany
- Schloss Kröchlendorff, 1848, Nordwestuckermark, Germany
- Schloss Schlemmin, 1850, Schlemmin, Germany
- Schloss Lanke, (renovation), 1858, Wandlitz, Germany
- Neue Synagoge, 1859-66 [bomb-damaged 1943, rebuilt 1995], Berlin, Germany

His son Gustav (1833–1916) was also an architect, as was his grandson Arnold (1879–1963), both of Berlin. His son Carl Eduard (Charles Edward) (1837–1886) was a businessman in London and New York City.
