= Großer Prebelowsee =

Lake in Brandenburg, Germany

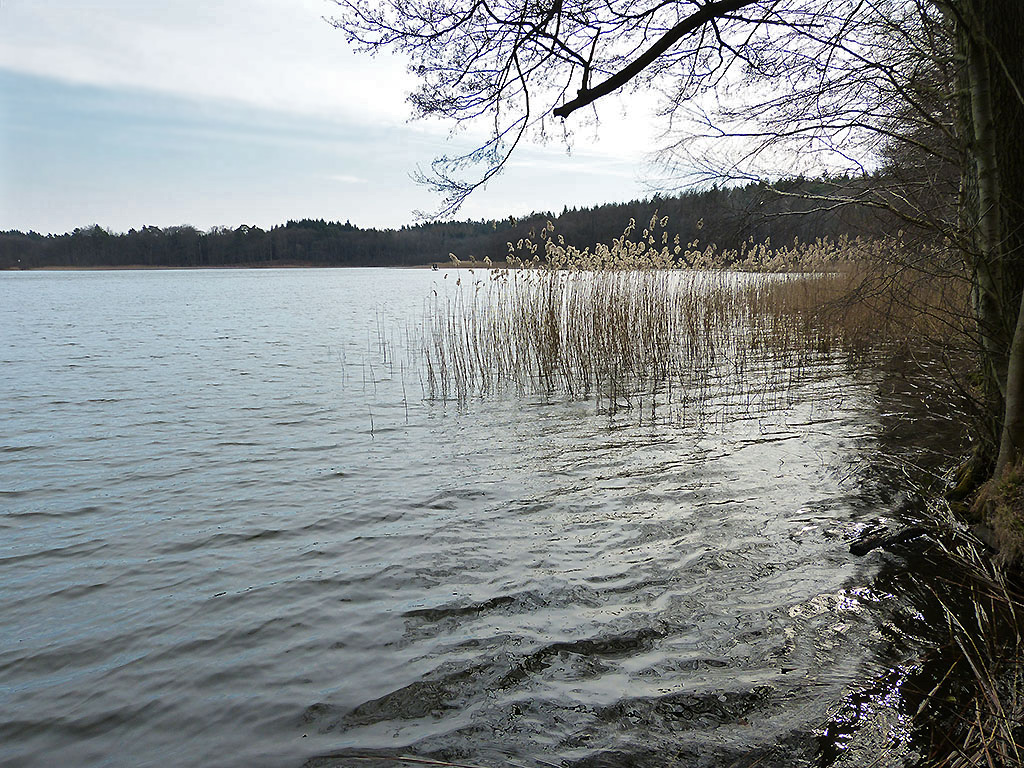

- Location within Brandenburg
- Location: Rheinsberg Lake Region, Brandenburg
- Coordinates: 53°10′34.84″N 12°52′54.58″E
- Basin countries: Germany
- Surface area: 2.8 km^{2} (1.1 mi^{2})
- Max. depth: 7.6 m (25 ft)
- Surface elevation: 55.7 m (183 ft)

The Großer Prebelowsee is a lake in the Rheinsberg Lake Region, Brandenburg, Germany. It has an elevation of 55.7 metres (183 ft) and a surface area of 2.8 square kilometres (1.1 mi^{2}). It is in Prebelow, a village in borough of Rheinsberg.

== See also ==
- Großer Zechliner See
- Schwarzer See
- Tietzowsee
- Zootzensee
