= Lac de Tracouet =

Lake in Valais, Switzerland

- Lac Noir
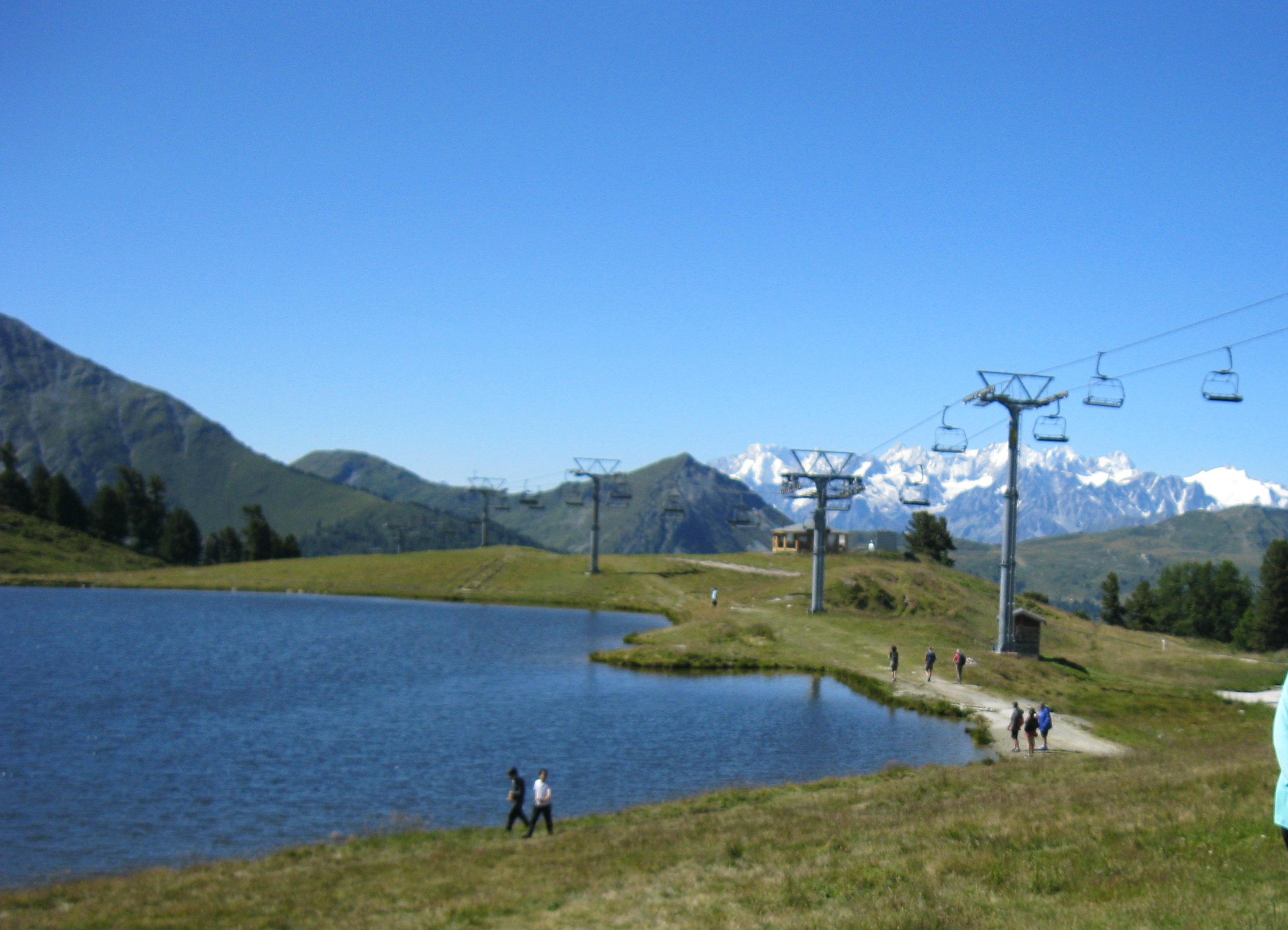

- Location within Canton of Valais Location within Switzerland Location within Alps
- Interactive map of Lac de Tracouet
- Location: Nendaz, Valais
- Coordinates: 46°09′35″N 07°17′02″E
- Basin countries: Switzerland
- Max. length: 206 m (676 ft)
- Max. width: 120 m (390 ft)
- Surface area: 1.85 ha (4.6 acres)
- Surface elevation: 2,171 m (7,123 ft)

Lac de Tracouet (also Lac Noir, "Black Lake") is a lake in the Nendaz municipality in the canton of Valais, Switzerland. It is situated at the foot of the Dent de Nendaz at an elevation of 2,171 m.

The lake can be reached by cable car or by foot from Haute-Nendaz to Tracouet (2,200 m) followed by a slight descent to the lake surface. The approximately 1.85 ha surface usually freezes during the winter season and is incorporated into the skiing area of the mountain.
