= Schloss Schlemmin =

German castle

- Schlemmin, Mecklenburg-Vorpommern
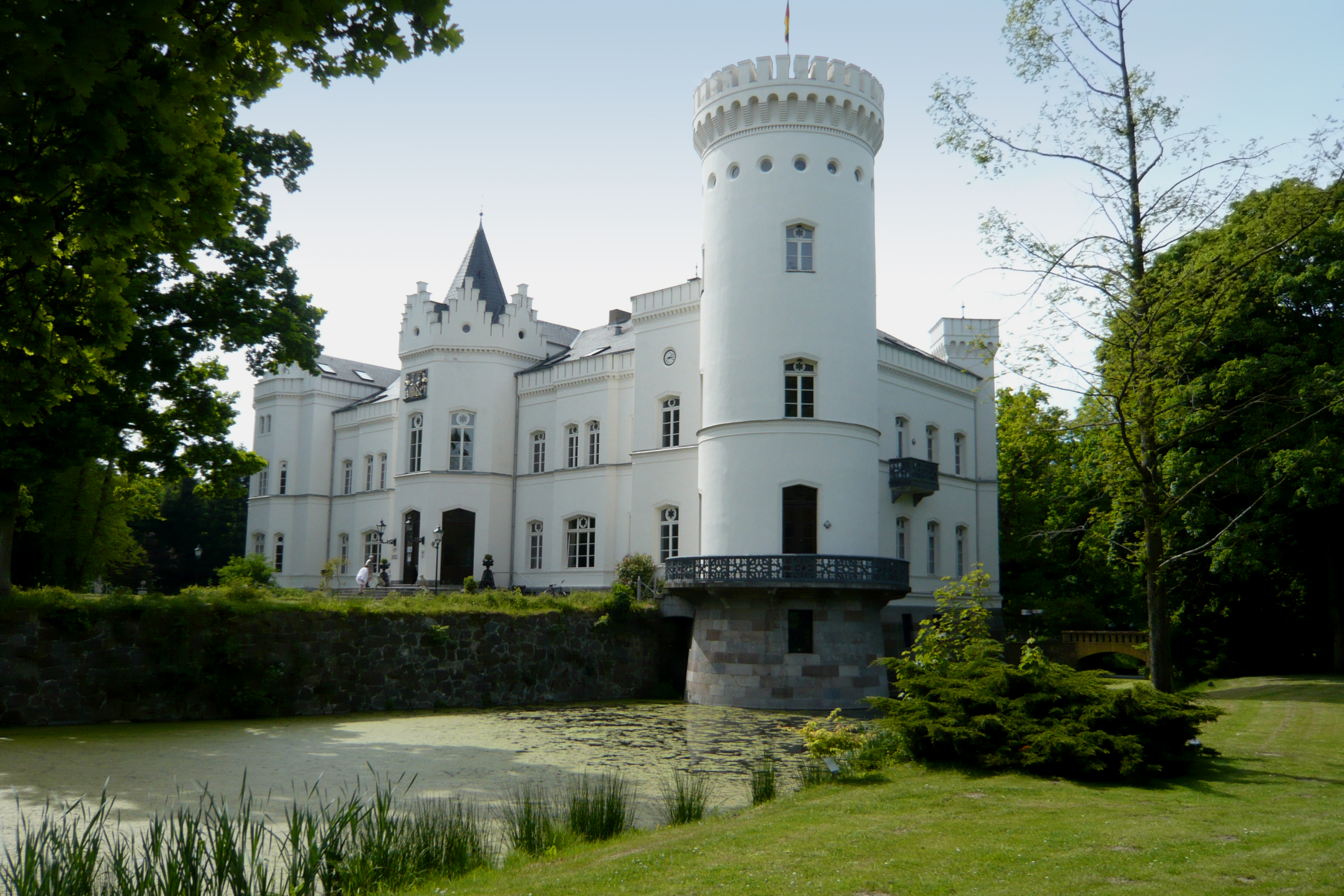
- Schloss Schlemmin

Site information
- Type: Schloss

Location
- Location in Germany Schloss Schlemmin (Germany)
- Coordinates: 54°13′21″N 12°40′45″E

Schloss Schlemmin is a Gothic Revival Schloss in Schlemmin, Germany. It is a hotel and restaurant.

== History ==
The presently visible building was built in 1846-50 to designs by architect Eduard Knoblauch; the foundations are however those of a medieval fortress, dating from the 14th century. The current building was constructed for Wilhelm Ulrich von Thun. During World War II, the castle was used as a hospital and refugee camp. After the war, it became part of East Germany and served a variety of purposes. In 1999 it was bought by an entrepreneur from Bremen who began restoration works of the neglected house. A hotel has been using the building since 2002.
