= Zootzensee =

Lake in Germany

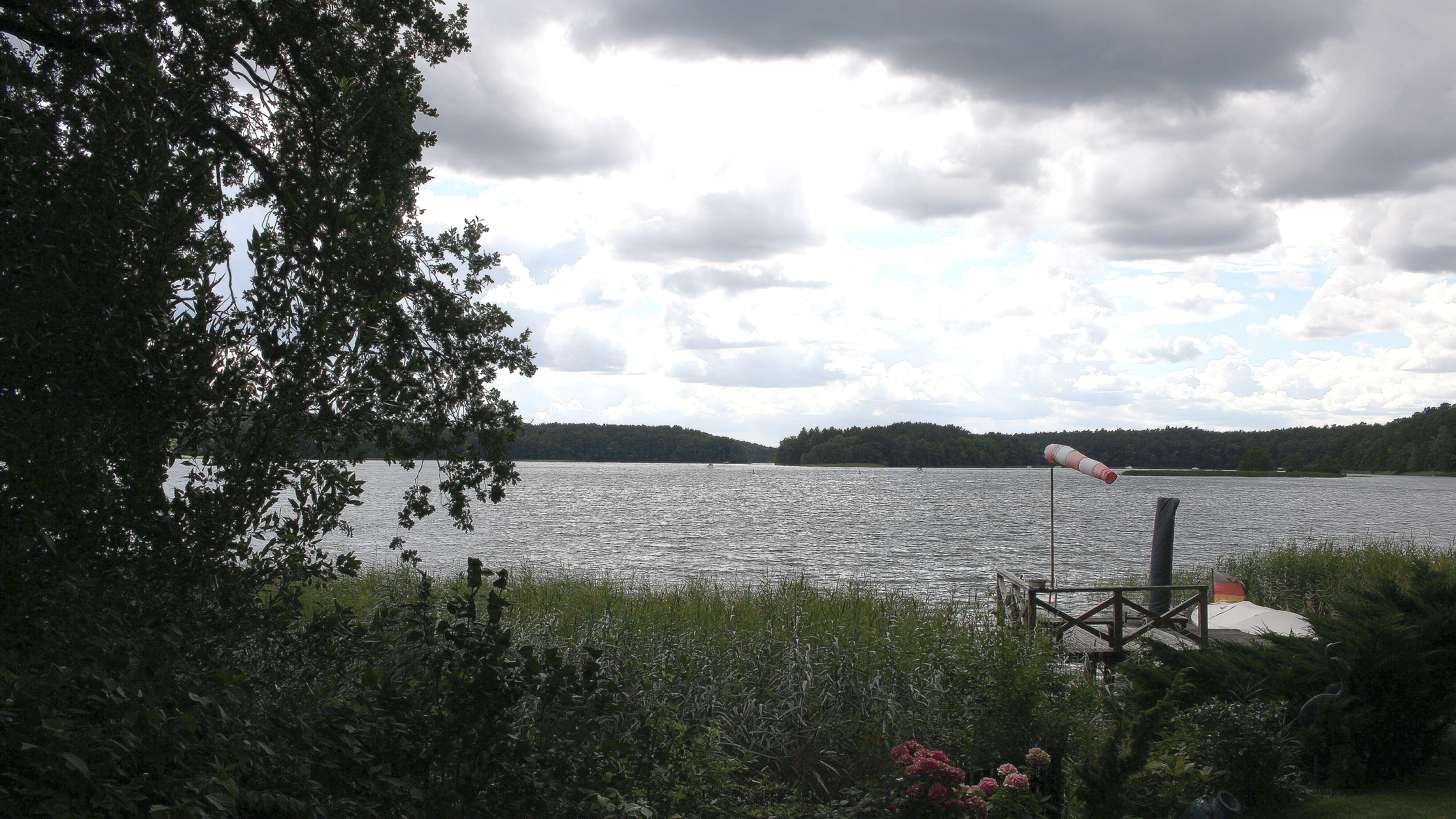
- Zootzensee

- Location within Germany
- Location: Rheinsberg Lake Region, Brandenburg
- Coordinates: 53°9′30″N 12°51′0″E
- Basin countries: Germany
- Surface area: 1.67 km^{2} (0.64 mi^{2})
- Max. depth: 21 m (69 ft)

Zootzensee is a lake in the Rheinsberg Lake Region, Brandenburg, Germany. It has an elevation of 21 metres (69 ft) and a surface area of 1.67 square kilometres (0.64 mi^{2}). It lies within the municipality of Rheinsberg.

== See also ==
- Großer Prebelowsee
- Großer Zechliner See
- Schwarzer See
- Tietzowsee
