= Großer Zechliner See =

Lake in Brandenburg, Germany

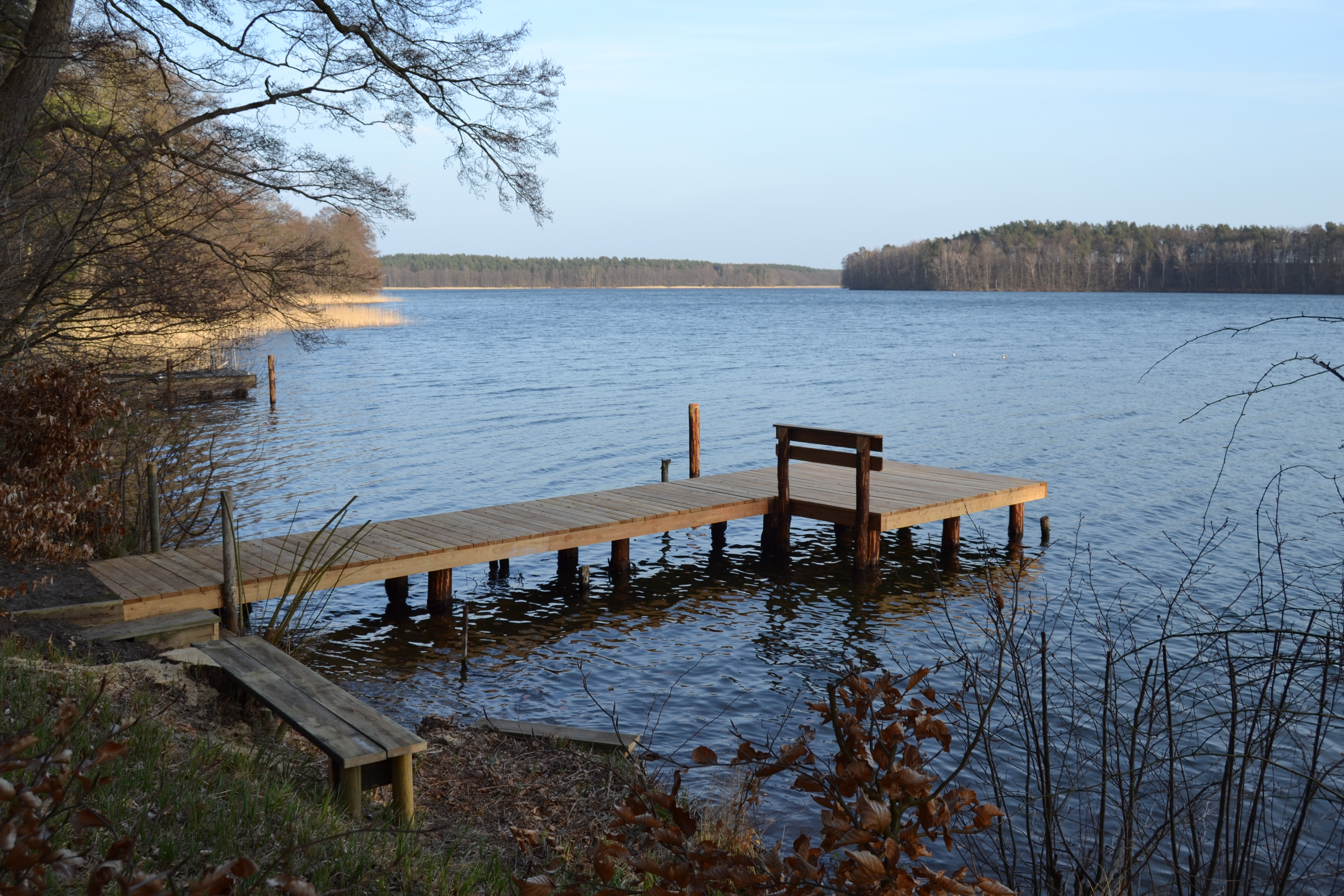

- Location within Brandenburg
- Location: Rheinsberg Lake Region, Brandenburg, Germany
- Coordinates: 53°9′24.64″N 12°47′59.91″E
- Primary outflows: canal
- Basin countries: Germany
- Surface area: 1.8 km^{2} (0.69 mi^{2})
- Max. depth: 35 m (115 ft)

The Großer Zechliner See is a lake in the Rheinsberg Lake Region of Brandenburg, Germany. It is in Rheinsberg, and its surface area is 1.8 square kilometres (0.69 mi^{2}).

== See also ==
- Großer Prebelowsee
- Schwarzer See
- Tietzowsee
- Zootzensee
