= Brunnethorn =

Mountain in Switzerland

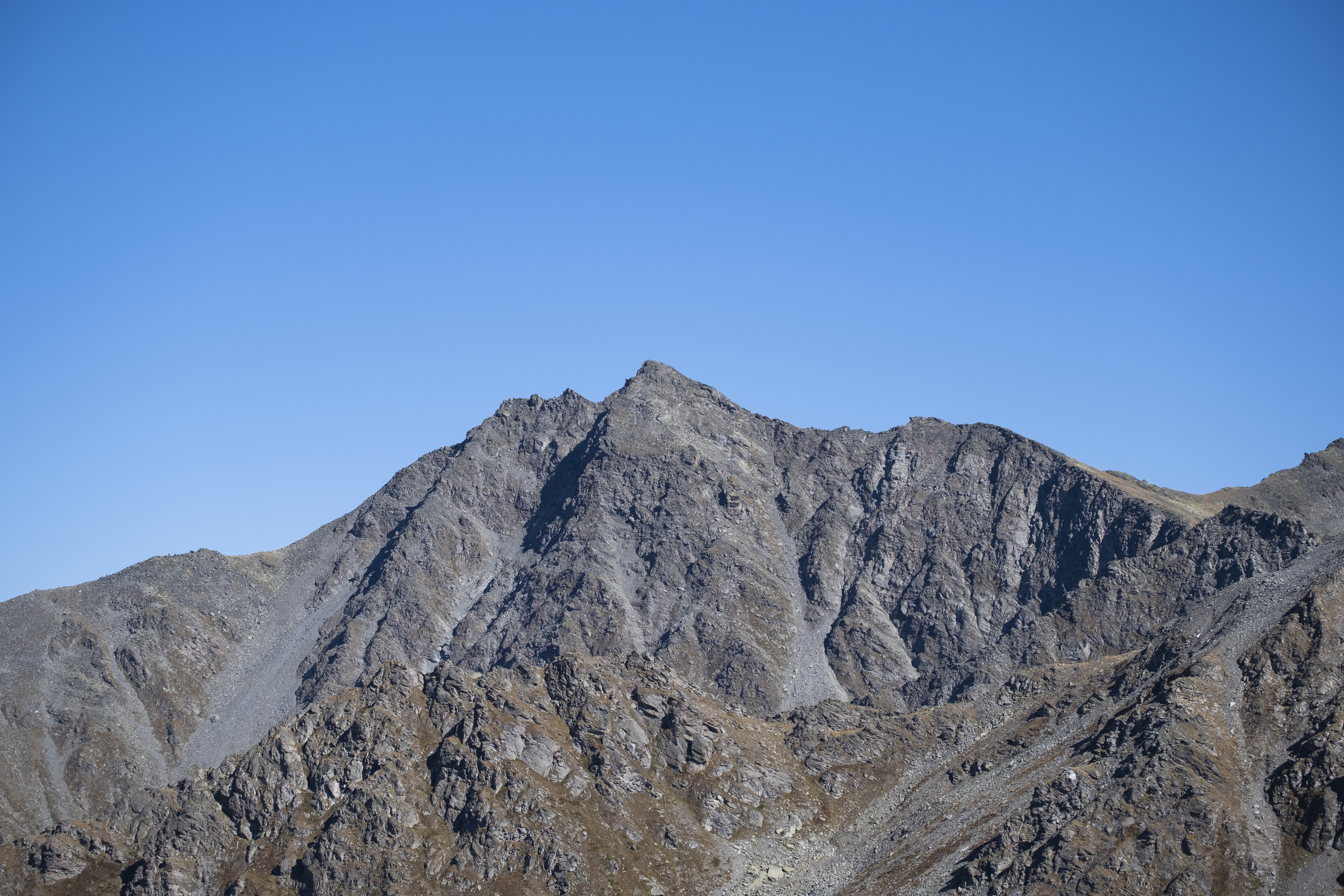
- Brunnethorn in September 2022

Highest point
- Elevation: 2,952 m (9,685 ft)
- Prominence: 131 m (430 ft)
- Parent peak: Bella Tola
- Coordinates: 46°15′15.6″N 7°39′58.2″E

Geography
- Location within Switzerland
- Location: Valais, Switzerland
- Parent range: Pennine Alps

The Brunnethorn is a mountain of the Swiss Pennine Alps, overlooking Oberems in the canton of Valais. It is located north of the higher Bella Tola.
