= Schwarzer See (Schlemmin) =

Lake in Mecklenburg-Vorpommern, Germany

Schwarze See
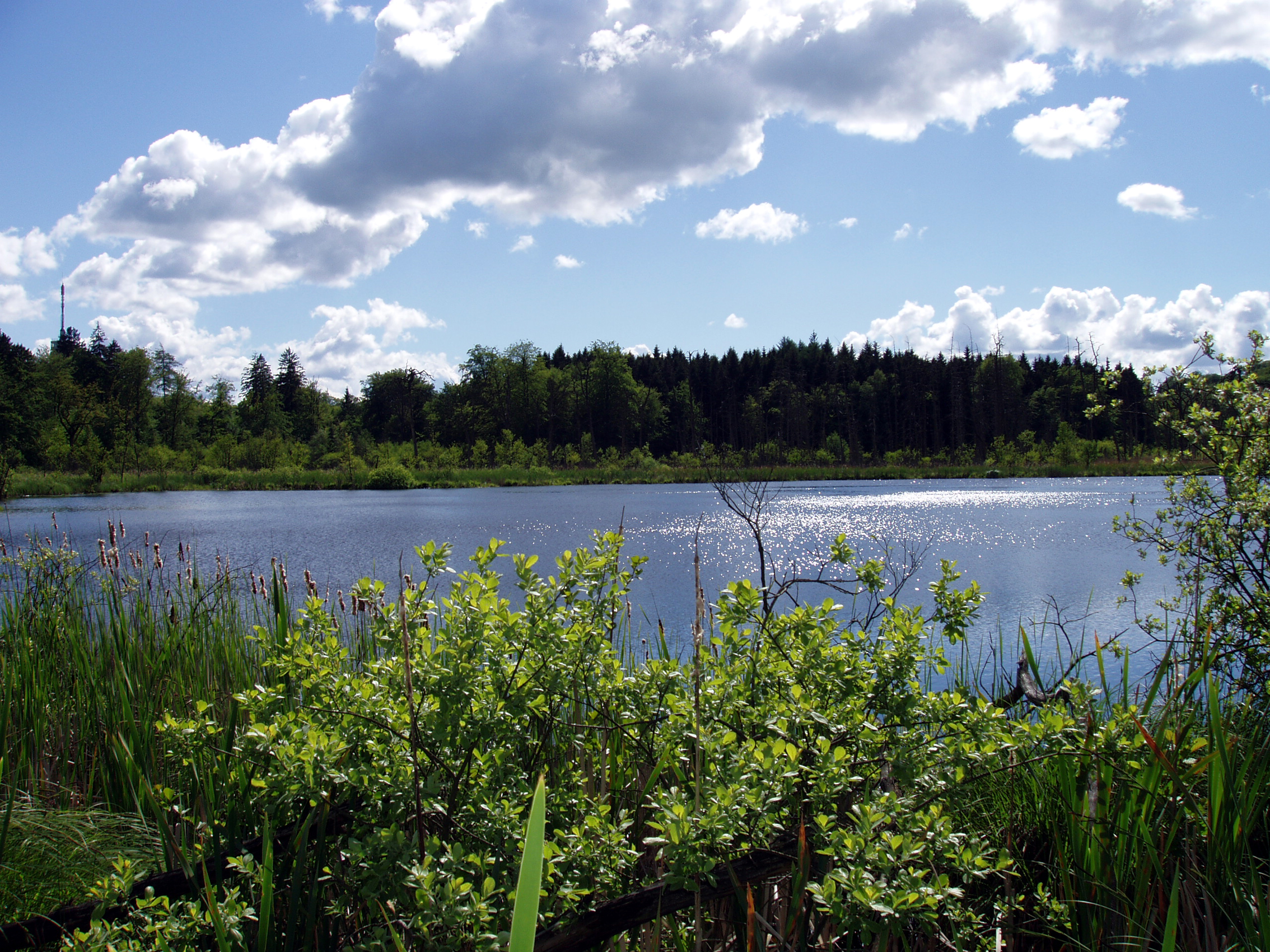

- Location within Mecklenburg-Vorpommern
- Location: Schlemmin, Rostock, Mecklenburg-Vorpommern
- Coordinates: 53°51′54″N 11°50′24″E
- Basin countries: Germany
- Surface area: 0.21 km^{2} (0.081 sq mi)
- Surface elevation: 108.3 m (355 ft)

The Schwarze See (literal translation: black lake) is a lake in Schlemmin, Rostock, Mecklenburg-Vorpommern, Germany. At an elevation of 108.3 m, its surface area is 0.21 km^{2}.
