= Tietzowsee =

Lake in Brandenburg, Germany

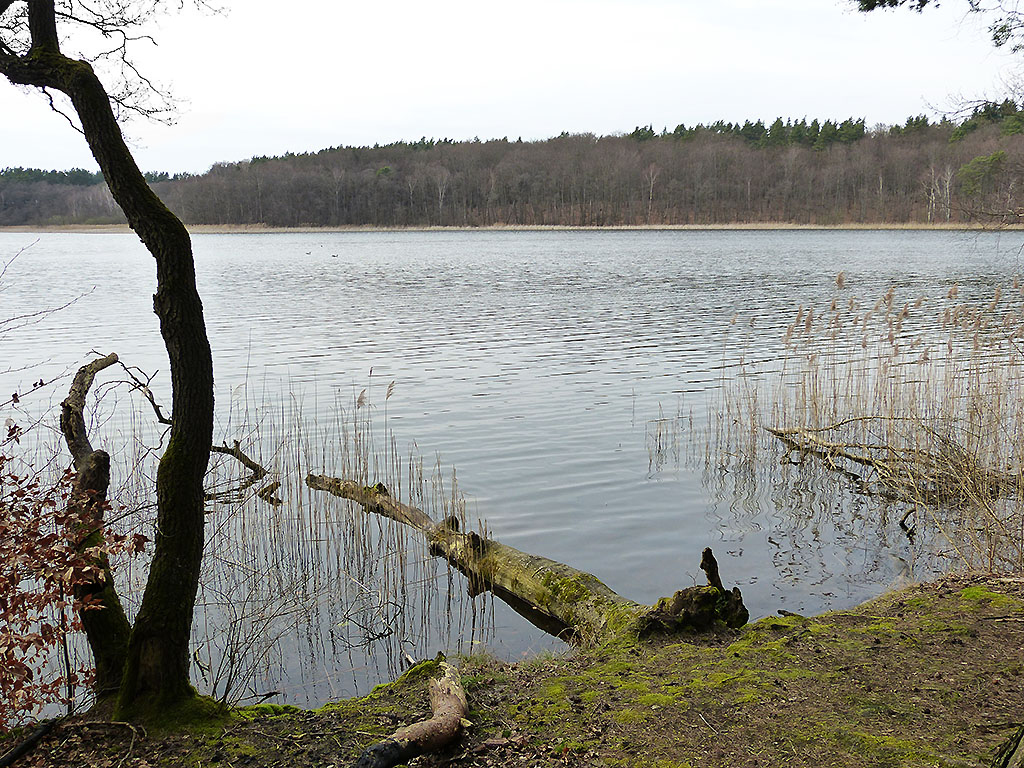
- 2014-03-21 Tietzowsee Campingplatz 320

- Location within Brandenburg
- Location: Rheinsberg Lake Region, Brandenburg
- Coordinates: 53°10′4.5″N 12°52′34.57″E
- Primary outflows: Jagowkanal
- Basin countries: Germany
- Surface area: 44 ha (110 acres)
- Max. depth: 8 m (26 ft)

The Tietzowsee is a lake in the Rheinsberg Lake Region in the German state of Brandenburg. It covers and area of 44 hectares (110 acres) within the municipality of Rheinsberg.

== See also ==
- Großer Prebelowsee
- Großer Zechliner See
- Schwarzer See
- Zootzensee
