= Zickhusen =

- Municipality
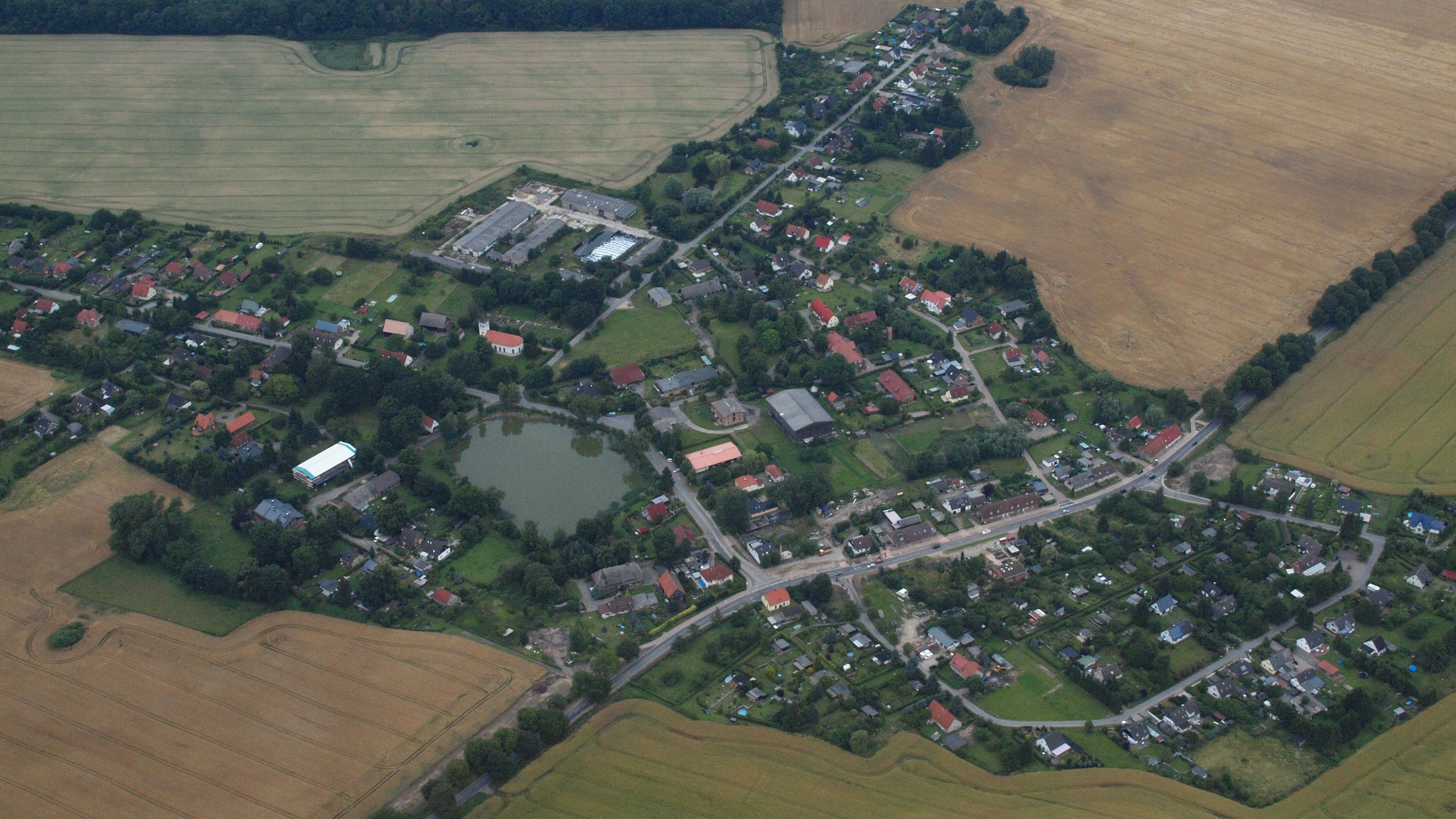
- Zickhusen

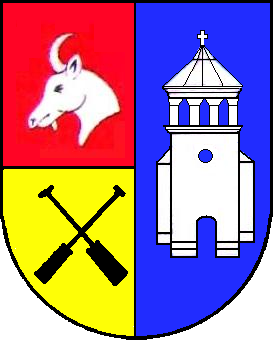
- Coat of arms

- Location of Zickhusen within Nordwestmecklenburg district
- Interactive map of Zickhusen
- Location within Germany Location within Mecklenburg-Vorpommern
- Coordinates: 53°46′N 11°25′E
- Country: Germany
- State: Mecklenburg-Vorpommern
- District: Nordwestmecklenburg
- Municipal assoc.: Lützow-Lübstorf

Government
  - Mayor: Hansjörg Rotermann

Area
  - Total: 12.44 km^{2} (4.80 sq mi)
- Elevation: 62 m (203 ft)

Population (2025-12-31)
  - Total: 515
  - Density: 41.4/km^{2} (107/sq mi)
- Time zone: UTC+01:00 (CET)
  - Summer (DST): UTC+02:00 (CEST)
- Postal codes: 19069
- Dialling codes: 03867
- Vehicle registration: NWM

Zickhusen is a municipality in the Nordwestmecklenburg district, in Mecklenburg-Vorpommern, Germany.

The small lake Schwarzer See is located in the municipality.
