= Nehmitzsee =

Lake in Germany

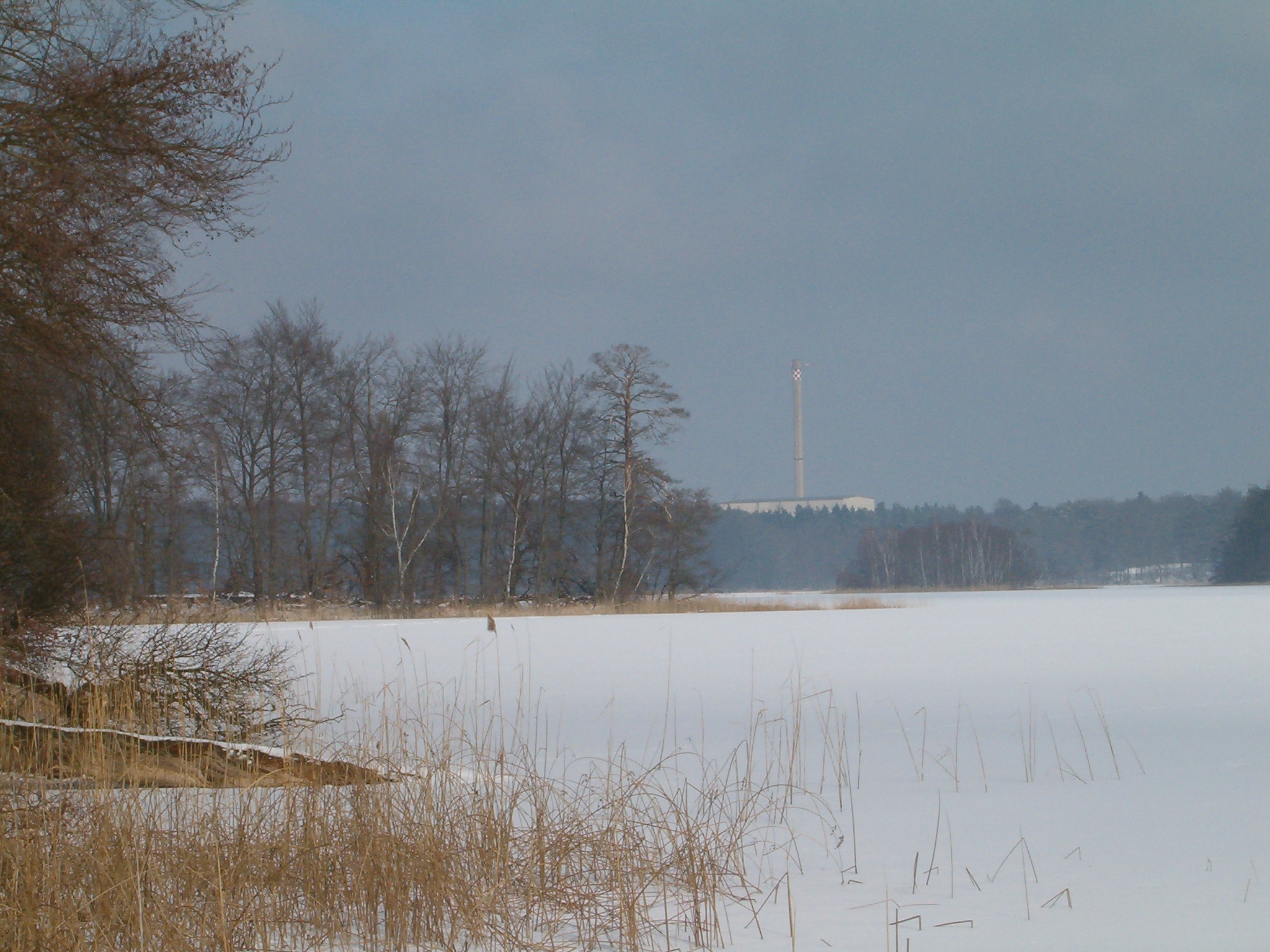

- Location within Brandenburg
- Location: Landkreis Oberhavel, Brandenburg
- Coordinates: 53°7′50″N 12°59′11″E
- Primary outflows: Polzowkanal
- Basin countries: Germany
- Surface area: 1.71 km^{2} (0.66 sq mi)
- Average depth: 6.4 m (21 ft)
- Max. depth: 18.6 m (61 ft)
- Surface elevation: 600 m (2,000 ft)

Nehmitzsee is a lake in Landkreis Oberhavel, Brandenburg, Germany. At an elevation of 60.0 m, its surface area is 1.71 km².
