= Schwarzer See (Schwarz) =

Lake in Mecklenburg-Vorpommern, Germany

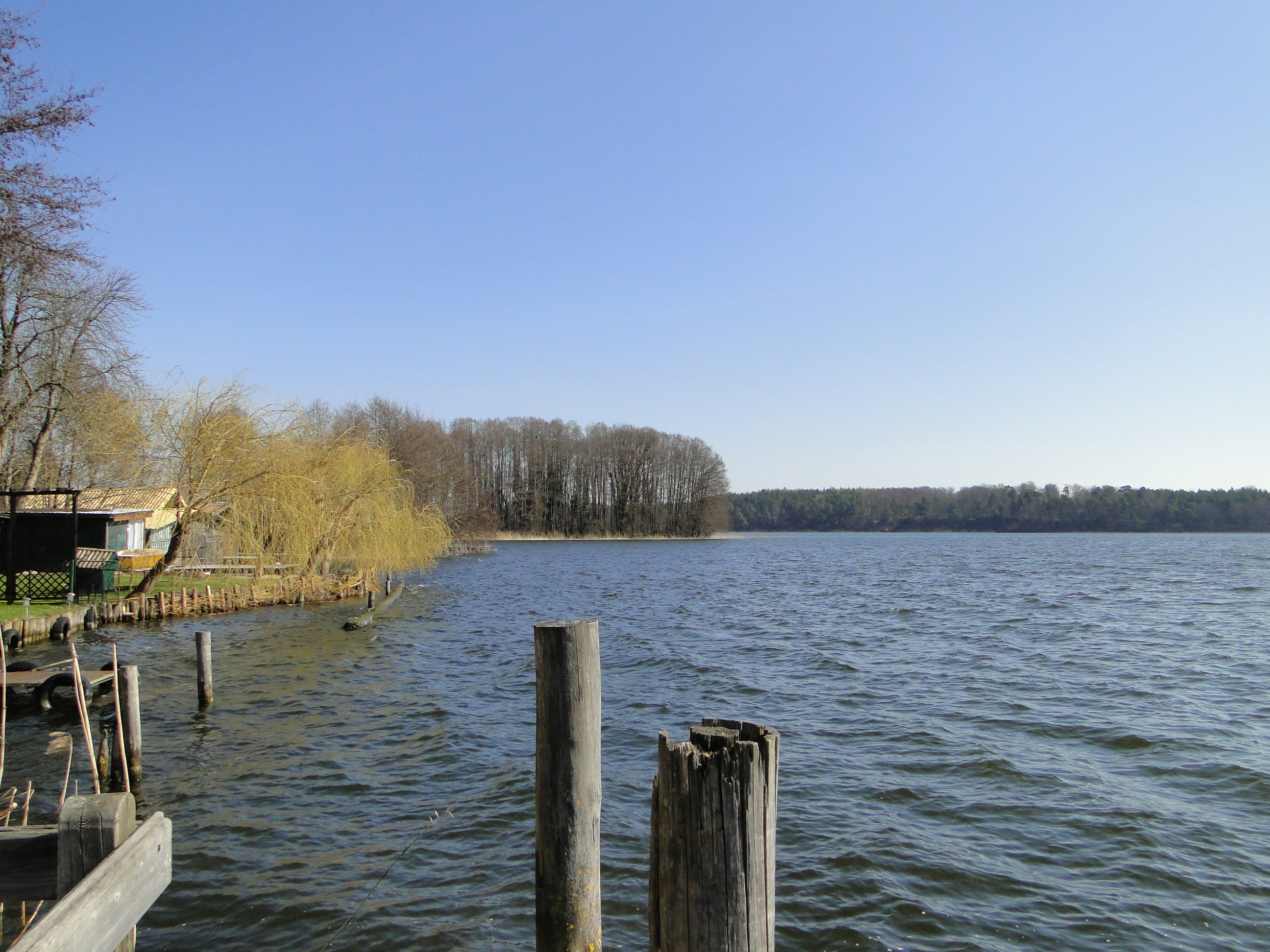

- Location within Mecklenburg-Vorpommern
- Location: Mecklenburgische Seenplatte, Mecklenburg-Vorpommern
- Coordinates: 53°13′28.33″N 12°47′49.24″E
- Basin countries: Germany
- Max. length: 2.6 km (1.6 mi)
- Max. width: 950 m (3,120 ft)
- Surface area: 0.364 km^{2} (0.141 sq mi)
- Surface elevation: 58.5 m (192 ft)
- Settlements: Schwarz

Schwarzer See is a lake in the municipality of Schwarz in the Mecklenburgische Seenplatte district in Mecklenburg-Vorpommern, Germany. At an elevation of 58.5 m, its surface area is 0.364 km^{2}.

The lake is approximately 2.6 kilometers long and between 200 and 950 meters wide. It flows into the Zethner See and is connected to the Müritz-Havel-Wasserstraße.
