= Schwarzsee (Zillertaler Alpen) =

- Location within Austria
- Location: Tyrol, Austria
- Coordinates: 47°02′25″N 11°49′47″E
- Type: lake

Schwarzsee (Zillertaler Alpen) is a lake of Tyrol, Austria.
