= Schwarzer See (Rheinsberg) =

Lake in Brandenburg, Germany

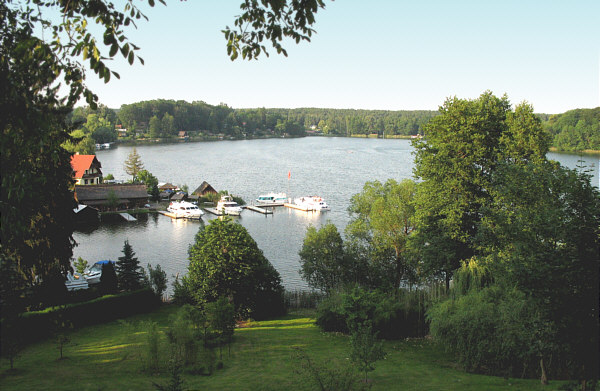

- Location within Brandenburg
- Location: Rheinsberg Lake Region, Brandenburg
- Coordinates: 53°9′27″N 12°46′25″E
- Primary outflows: channel
- Basin countries: Germany
- Surface area: 30 ha (74 acres)
- Max. depth: 12 m (39 ft)

The Schwarzer See ("Black Lake") is a lake in the Rheinsberg Lake Region in the German state of Brandenburg. It has a surface area of 30 hectares (74 acres). It lies within the municipality of Rheinsberg.

== See also ==
- Großer Prebelowsee
- Großer Zechliner See
- Tietzowsee
- Zootzensee
