= Dent de Nendaz =

Mountain in Switzerland

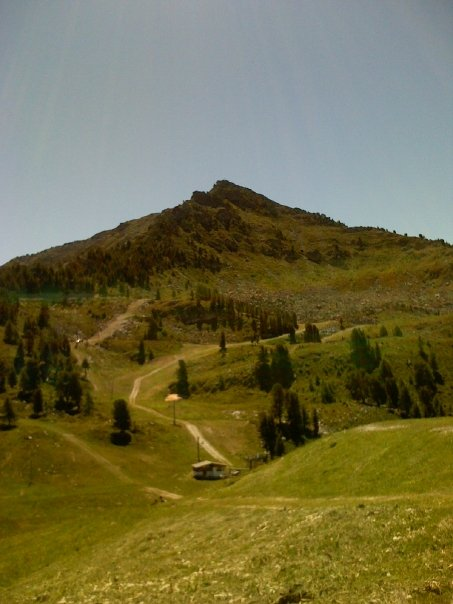
- Dent de Nendaz as seen from its base at Tracouet.

Highest point
- Elevation: 2,463 m (8,081 ft)
- Prominence: 126 m (413 ft)
- Coordinates: 46°9′22″N 7°17′29.4″E

Geography
- Location within Switzerland
- Location: Valais, Switzerland
- Parent range: Pennine Alps

The Dent de Nendaz (literally "Tooth of Nendaz") is a mountain of the Swiss Pennine Alps, overlooking Nendaz in the canton of Valais. Its 2,463-metre-high (8,081 ft) summit can be easily reached from the cable car station of Tracouet (2,200 m).

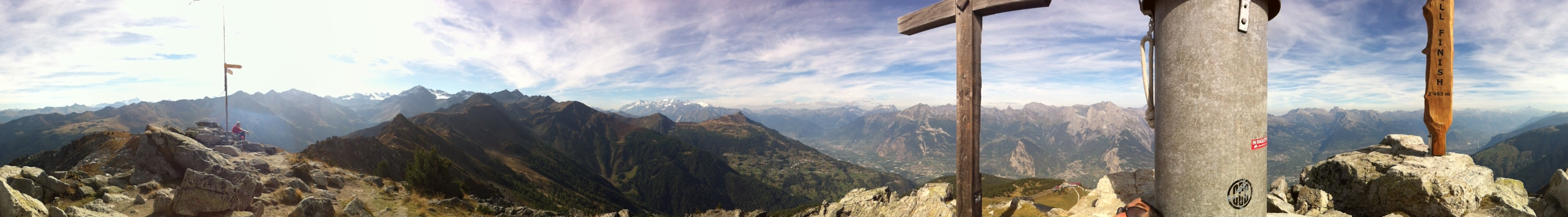
A panorama from the summit, 2012
