= Großer Wummsee =

Lake in Ostprignitz-Ruppin District, Brandenburg, Germany

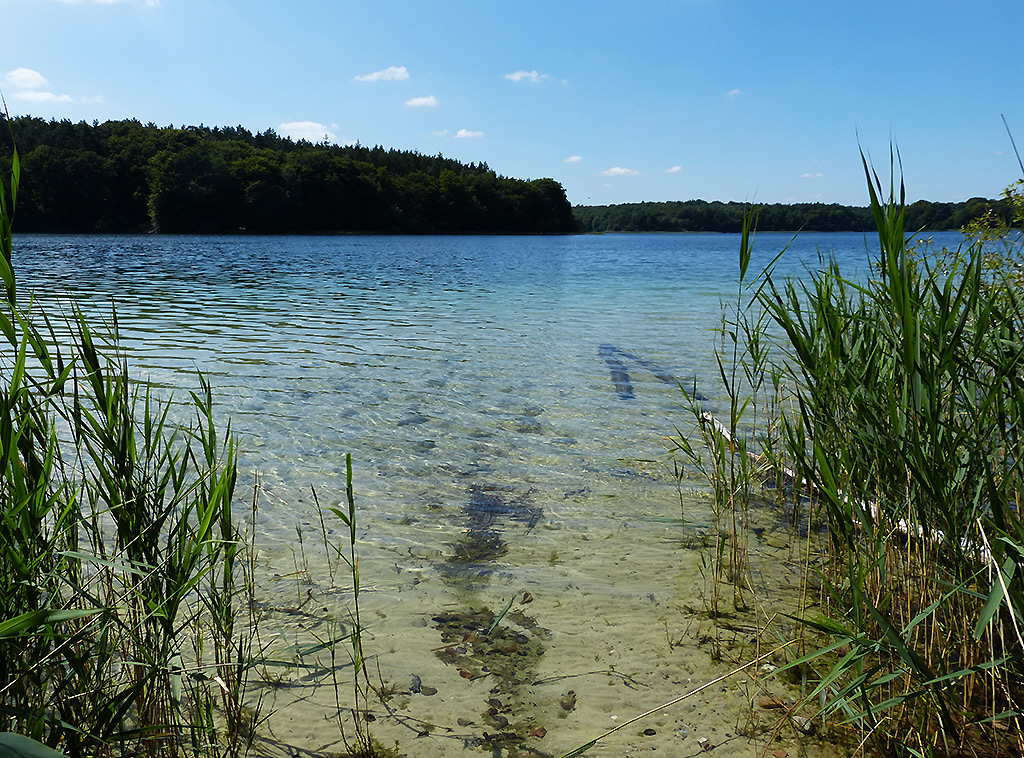

- Location within Brandenburg
- Location: Landkreis Ostprignitz-Ruppin, Brandenburg
- Coordinates: 53°11′18″N 12°48′1″E
- Primary outflows: none
- Basin countries: Germany
- Surface area: 1.52 km^{2} (0.59 sq mi)
- Max. depth: 35 m (115 ft)
- Surface elevation: 610 m (2,000 ft)

Großer Wummsee is a lake in Landkreis Ostprignitz-Ruppin, Brandenburg, Germany. At an elevation of 61,0 m, its surface area is 1.52 km². There are also hiking and biking trails around the lake as well as historical sites.
