= Schwarzer See (Zickhusen) =

Lake in Mecklenburg-Vorpommern, Germany

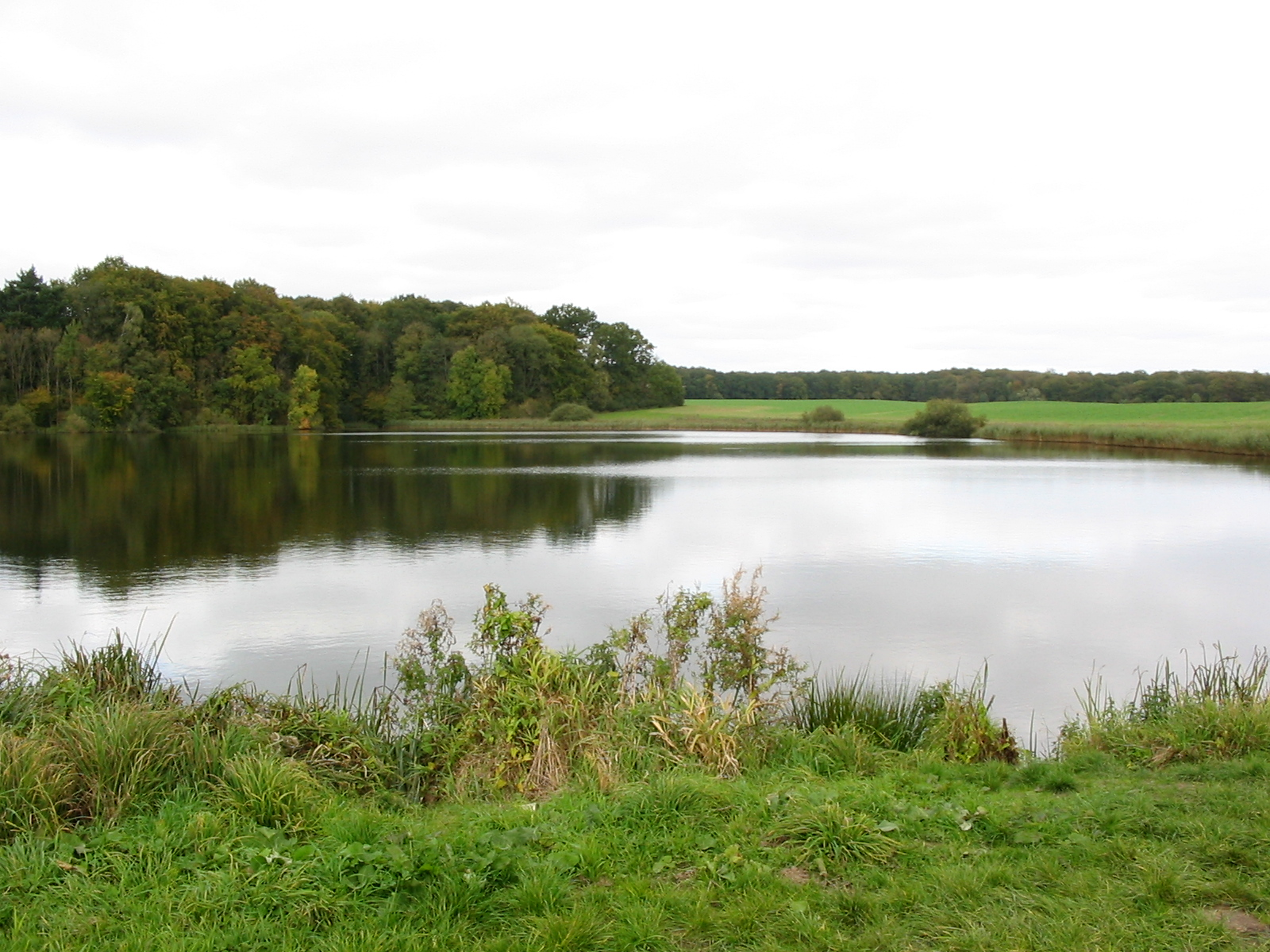

- Location within Mecklenburg-Vorpommern
- Location: Zickhusen, Mecklenburg-Vorpommern
- Coordinates: 53°46′12″N 11°25′25″E
- Basin countries: Germany
- Surface area: 0.06 km^{2} (0.023 sq mi)
- Surface elevation: 59.6 m (196 ft)

Schwarzer See is a lake at Zickhusen in the west of Mecklenburg-Vorpommern, Germany. At an elevation of 59.6 metres (196 ft), its surface area is 0.06 square kilometres (0.023 sq mi).
