= Rheinsberg =

- Town
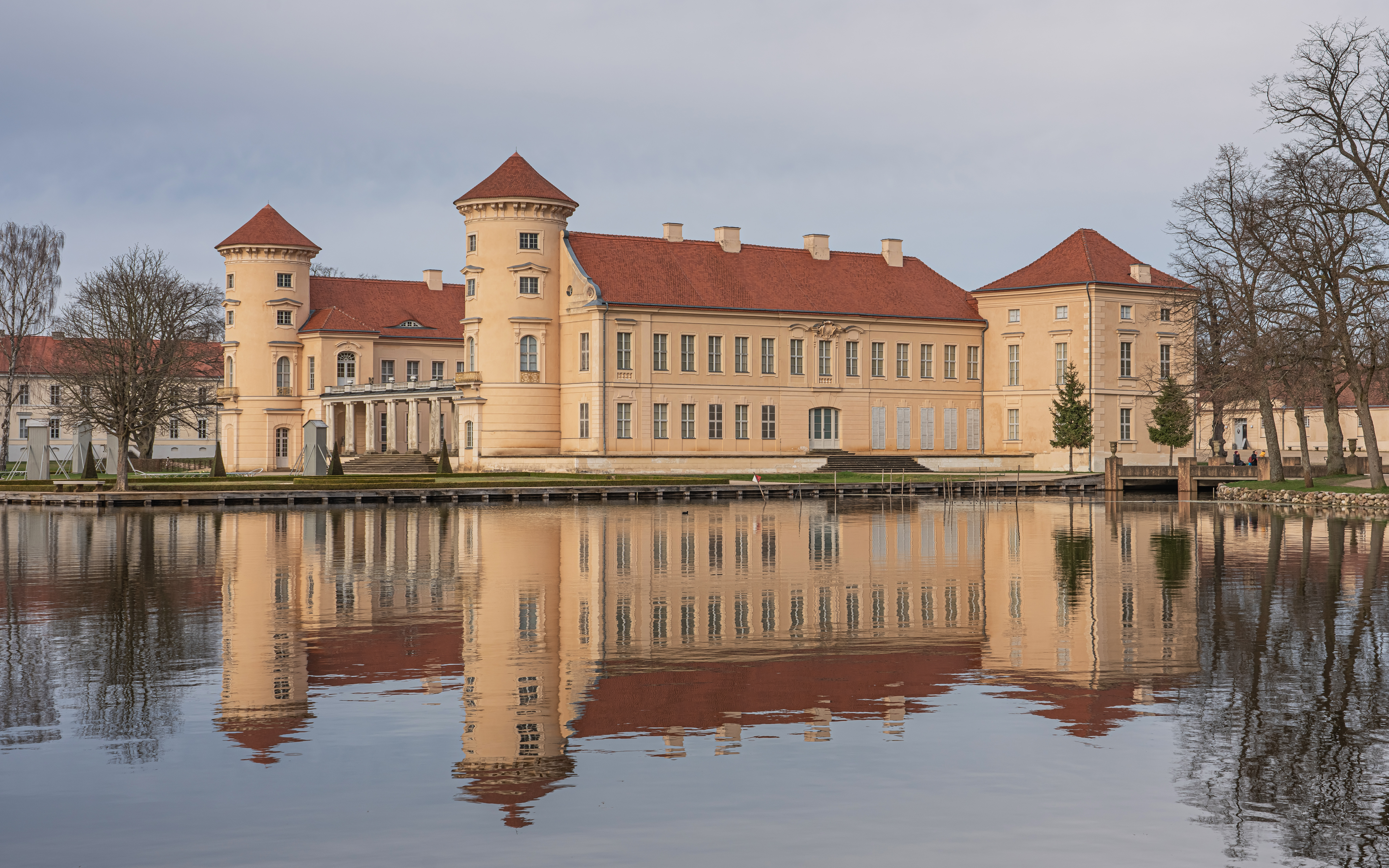
- Schloss Rheinsberg

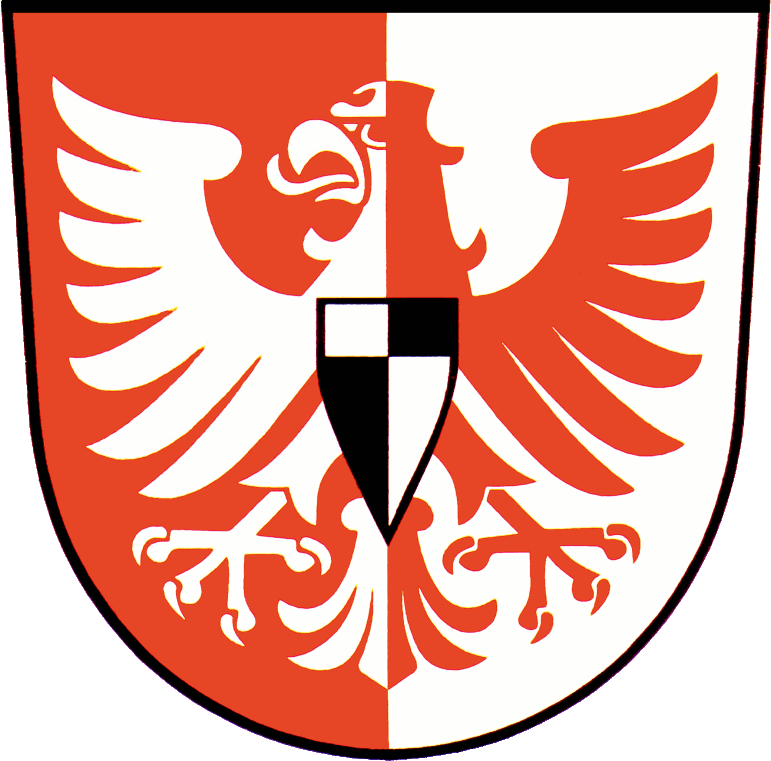
- Coat of arms

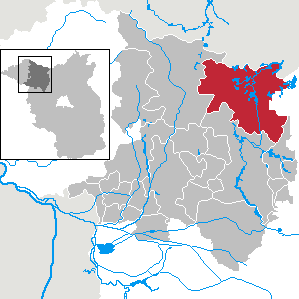
- Location of Rheinsberg within Ostprignitz-Ruppin district
- Interactive map of Rheinsberg
- Location within Germany Location within Brandenburg
- Coordinates: 53°5′54″N 12°53′45″E
- Country: Germany
- State: Brandenburg
- District: Ostprignitz-Ruppin
- Subdivisions: 17 Ortsteile

Government
  - Mayor (2017–25): Frank-Rudi Schwochow

Area
  - Total: 328.21 km^{2} (126.72 sq mi)
- Elevation: 61 m (200 ft)

Population (2025-12-31)
  - Total: 7,663
  - Density: 23.35/km^{2} (60.47/sq mi)
- Time zone: UTC+01:00 (CET)
  - Summer (DST): UTC+02:00 (CEST)
- Postal codes: 16831
- Dialling codes: 033931
- Vehicle registration: OPR
- Website: www.rheinsberg.de

Rheinsberg (German pronunciation: [ˈʁaɪnsbɛʁk]; Low German: Rhinsbarg) is a town and a municipality in the Ostprignitz-Ruppin district, in Brandenburg, in north-eastern Germany. It is located on lake Grienericksee and the river Rhin, approximately 20 km (12 mi) north-east of Neuruppin and 75 km (47 mi) north-west of Berlin.

== History ==
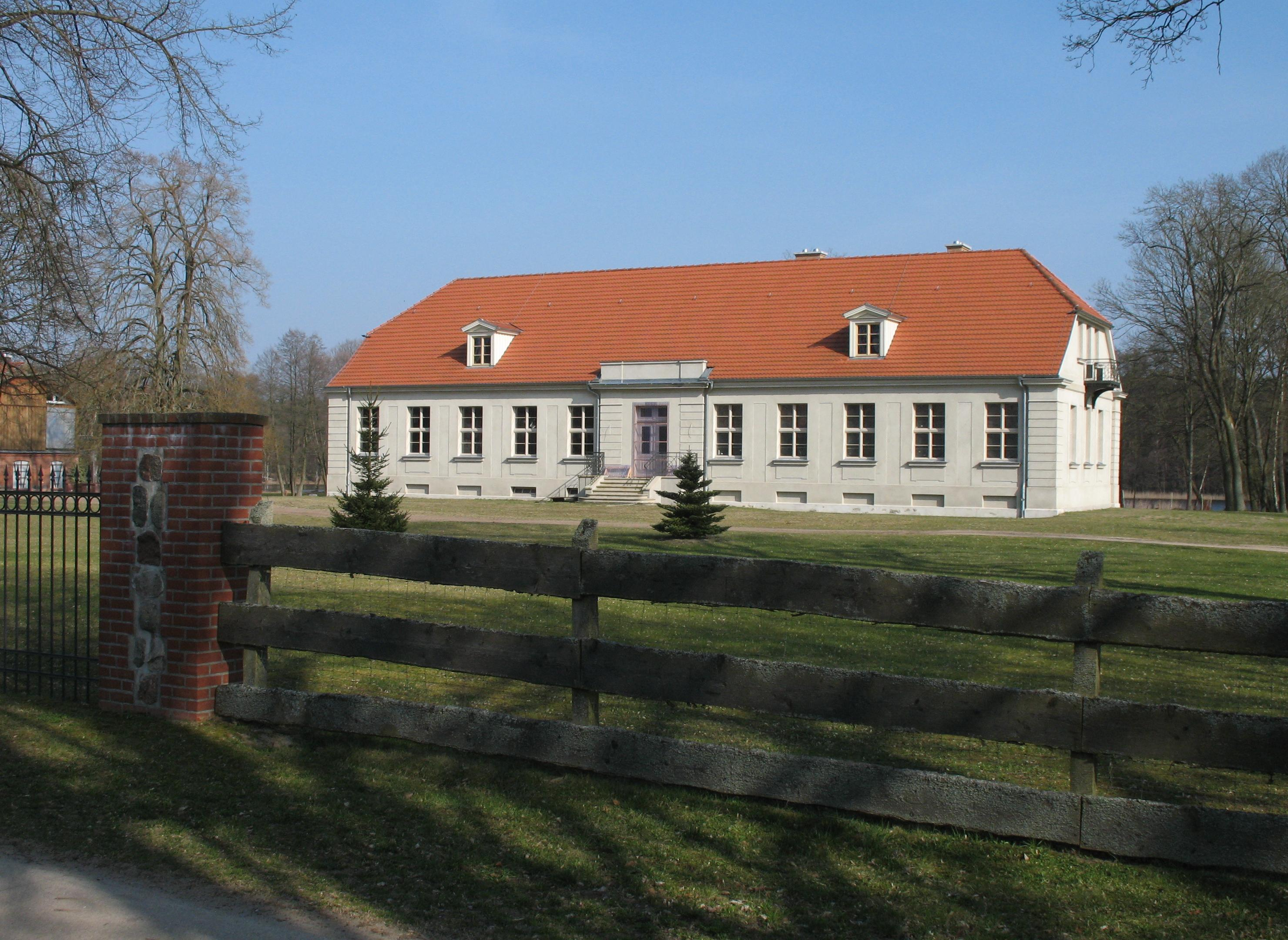
Manor in Wittwien

Frederick the Great, while still Crown Prince, designed and moved into a restored château in Rheinsberg shortly after his 1733 marriage to Elisabeth Christine of Brunswick-Bevern. Here he experienced his "Rheinsberg Period", an era marked by regular correspondence with Voltaire, boisterous celebration in the company of minor philosophers and musicians, and the writing of several works of political theory, including the Anti-Machiavel.

Crown Prince Frederick lived in the castle in Rheinsberg with his wife until he became King of Prussia in 1740 upon the death of his father, Frederick William I. He immediately banished his wife to Schönhausen Castle in the district of Berlin that is today called Pankow. King Frederick never visited his Queen and she was not allowed to visit him. She lived alone in her castle in Pankow until her death in 1797.

In June 1744, Frederick the Great gave his castle in Rheinsberg to his younger brother, Prince Henry of Prussia. Frederick also gave Prince Henry a great city palace on Unter den Linden in Berlin, which is today Humboldt University.

Prince Henry often said that his older brother improperly took credit for a series of military victories.

Four years after the death of Frederick the Great in 1786, Prince Henry erected a large obelisk at his castle in Rheinsberg. The obelisk was erected in honor of Prince Henry's younger brother, Prince August Wilhelm. In 1757 King Frederick dismissed his brother Prince August Wilhelm from the army in disgrace after Frederick's humiliating defeat in 1757 at the battle of Kolín in Bohemia. Frederick unjustly blamed his brother of being a coward and incompetent as a military leader. Prince August Wilhelm died the following year. He probably died of meningitis, but many contemporaries, including Prince August's brother Prince Henry, believed that August Wilhelm died because of Frederick's demeaning and humiliating treatment of his brother.

On the obelisk, Prince Henry placed 28 medallions honoring a number of prussian generals for military victories that Frederick had falsely claimed as his. On the obelisk, Frederick the Great is not mentioned with one single word. In private correspondence, Prince Henry made no secret of the fact that the obelisk was a criticism of his brother.

The obelisk in Rheinsberg can be seen to this day.

In 1870, the painter Eduard Gaertner and his family decided to leave the hectic atmosphere of Berlin and settle in Flecken Zechlin, a suburb of Rheinsberg – where he lived until his death in 1877.

Rheinsberg is the location for Kurt Tucholsky's Rheinsberg, a 1912 picture book for lovers based on an autobiographical weekend trip.

A subcamp of the Ravensbrück concentration camp was operated in Rheinsberg during World War II.

== Demography ==
Development of population since 1875 within the current Boundaries (Blue Line: Population; Dotted Line: Comparison to Population development in Brandenburg state; Grey Background: Time of Nazi Germany; Red Background: Time of communist East Germany)

Recent Population Development and Projections (Population Development before Census 2011 (blue line); Recent Population Development according to the Census in Germany in 2011 (blue bordered line); Official projections for 2005-2030 (yellow line); for 2017-2030 (scarlet line); for 2020-2030 (green line)

Rheinsberg: Population development
within the current boundaries (2020)

Year	Pop.	±% p.a.
1875	7,461	—
1890	7,554	+0.08%
1910	8,015	+0.30%
1925	8,263	+0.20%
1939	9,063	+0.66%
1950	11,188	+1.93%
1964	10,391	−0.53%

Year	Pop.	±% p.a.
1971	10,450	+0.08%
1981	9,635	−0.81%
1985	9,612	−0.06%
1990	9,700	+0.18%
1995	9,390	−0.65%
2000	9,374	−0.03%
2005	9,005	−0.80%

Year	Pop.	±% p.a.
2010	8,466	−1.23%
2015	8,153	−0.75%
2016	8,161	+0.10%
2017	8,111	−0.61%
2018	8,015	−1.18%
2019	8,007	−0.10%
2020	7,948	−0.74%

== Geography ==
=== Lakes ===
- Großer Prebelowsee
- Großer Zechliner See
- Schwarzer See
- Tietzowsee
- Zootzensee

== Photogallery ==
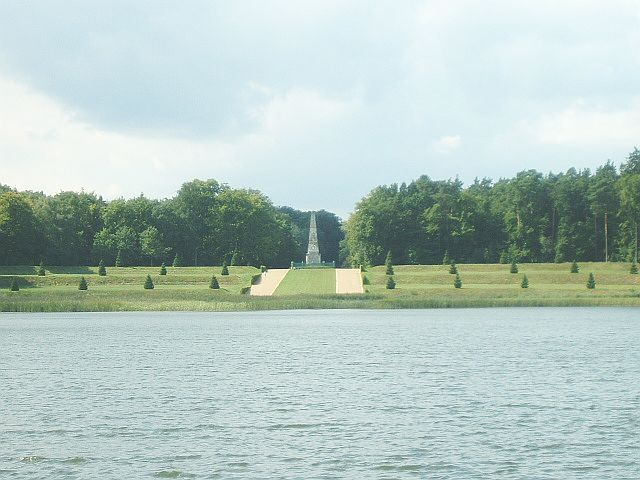
Obelisk monument opposite Rheinsberg Palace

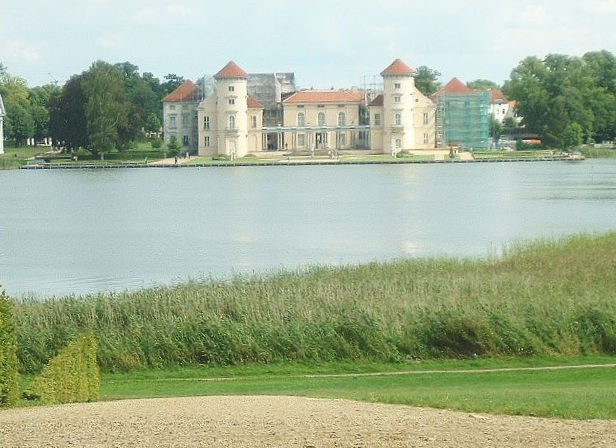
Rheinsberg Palace seen from monument place

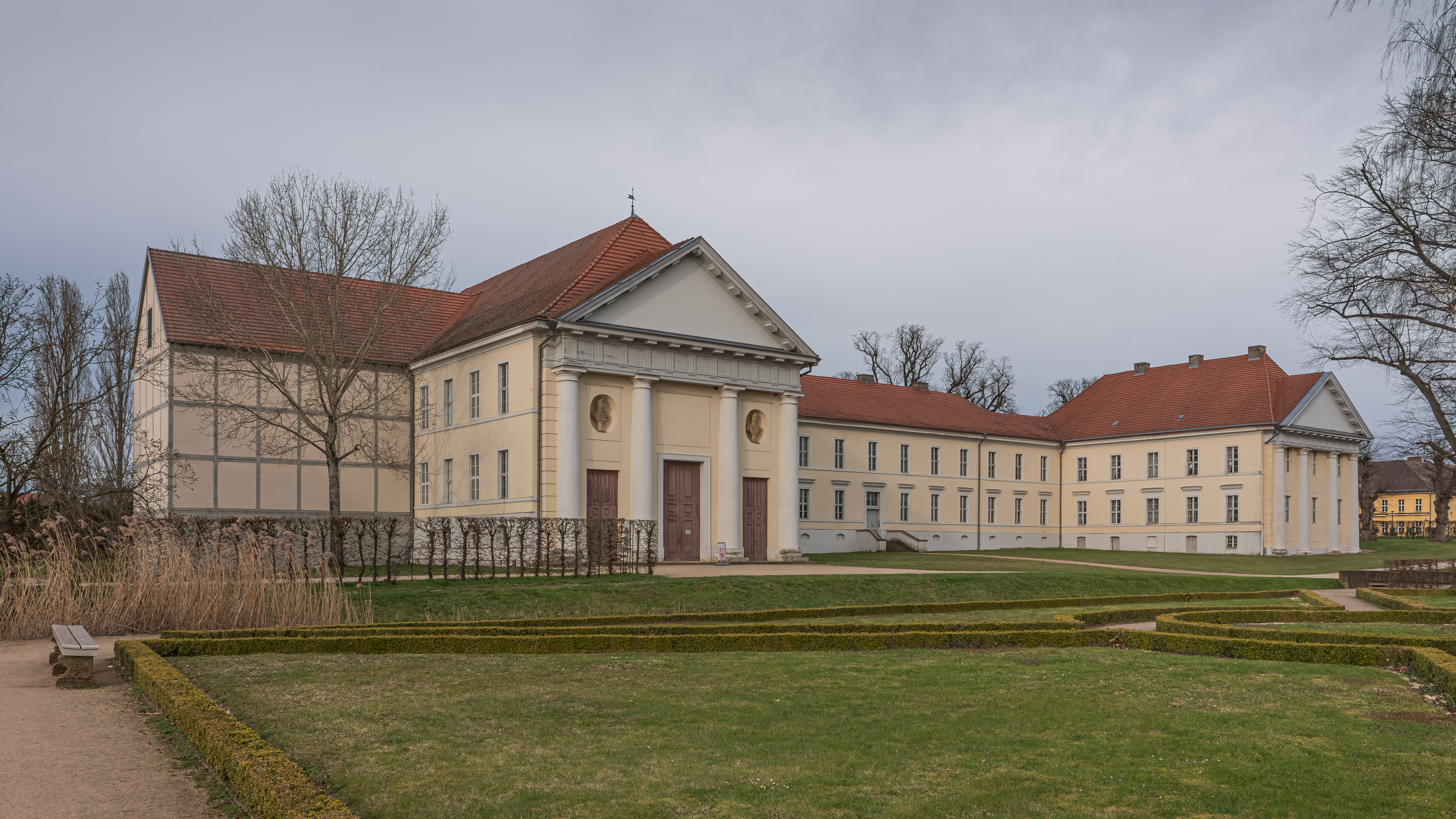
Concerthall (part of the Rheinberg Palace)

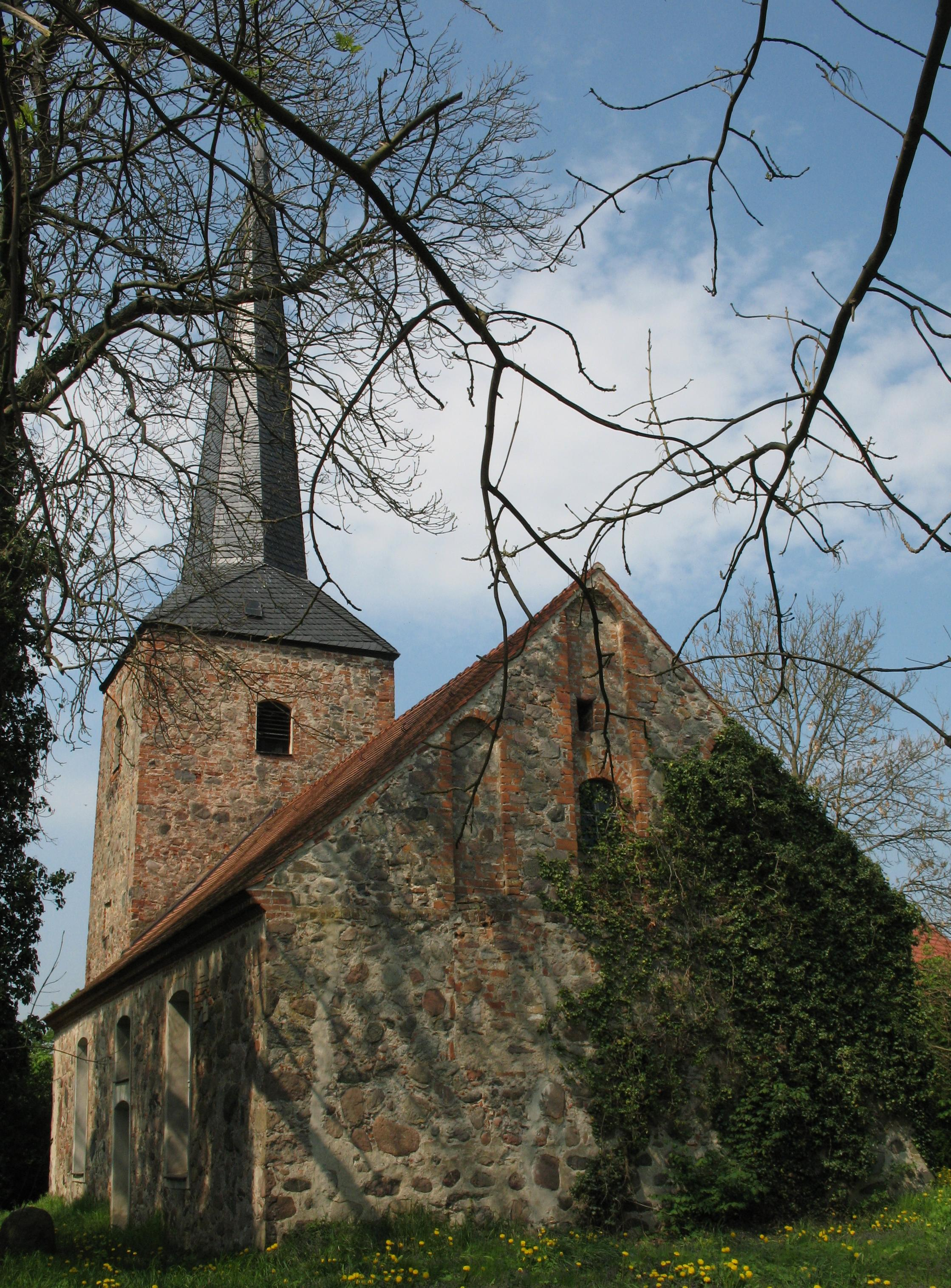
Church in Dierberg

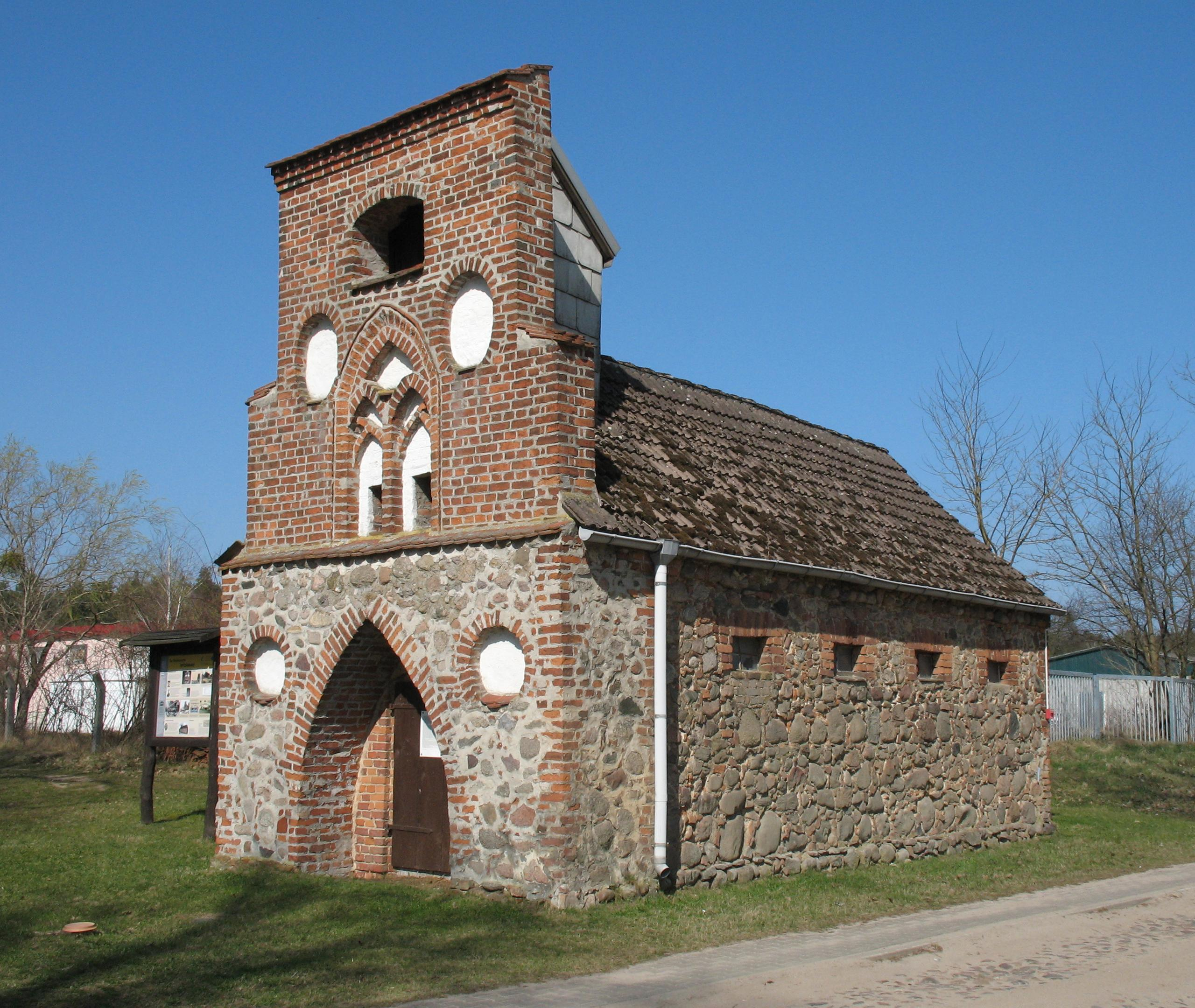
Fire engine house in Heinrichsdorf

== Twin towns ==
- (United States) Huber Heights (Ohio, USA)

== People from Rheinsberg ==
- Gad Granach (1915–2011), German writer
- Erhard Egidi (1929–2014), German cantor, composer and organist
- Lothar Baumgarten (1944–2018), German artist
- Rambow Richard (1917-1943), German soldier, holder of the Knight's Cross
