= Schlemmin =

- Municipality
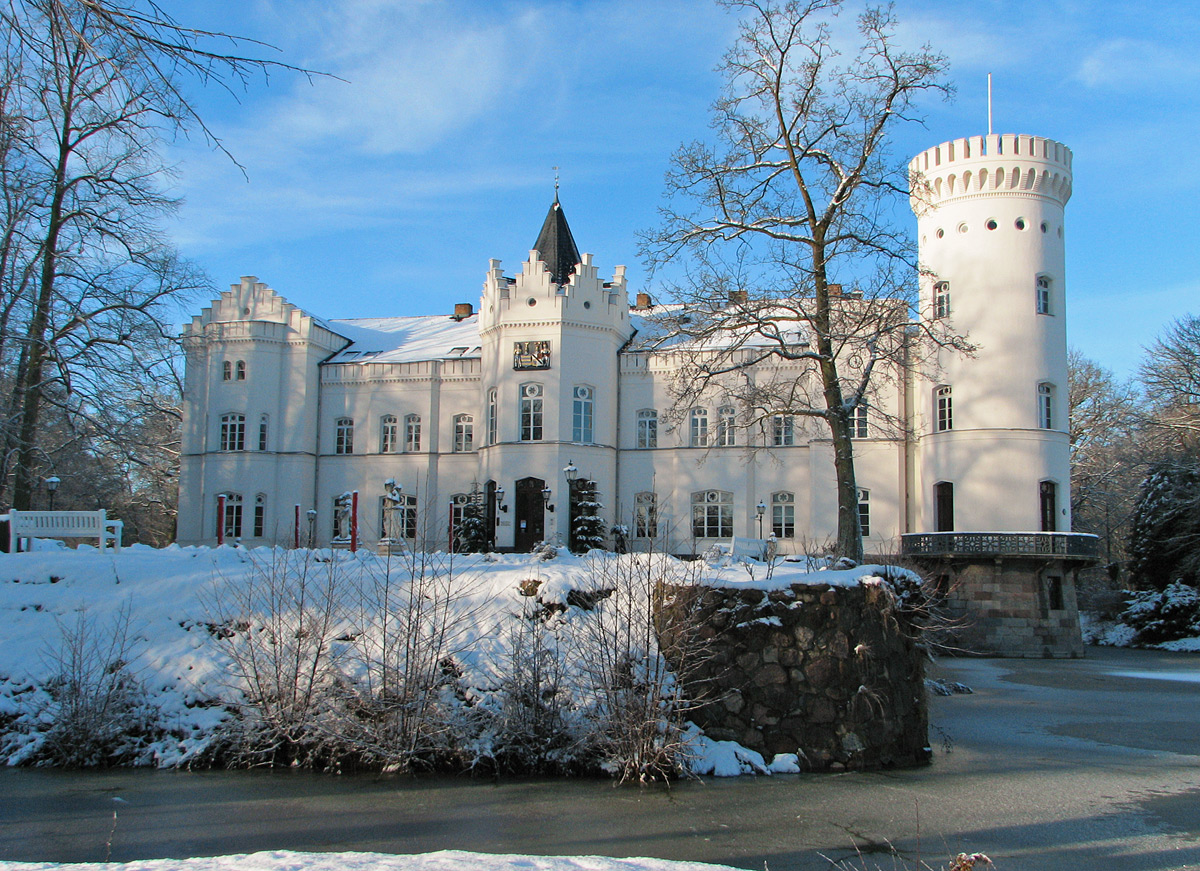
- Schlemmin Castle

- Location of Schlemmin within Vorpommern-Rügen district
- Interactive map of Schlemmin
- Location within Germany Location within Mecklenburg-Vorpommern
- Coordinates: 54°14′N 12°41′E
- Country: Germany
- State: Mecklenburg-Vorpommern
- District: Vorpommern-Rügen
- Municipal assoc.: Ribnitz-Damgarten

Government
  - Mayor: Christel Kranz

Area
  - Total: 21.83 km^{2} (8.43 sq mi)
- Elevation: 22 m (72 ft)

Population (2025-12-31)
  - Total: 270
  - Density: 12/km^{2} (32/sq mi)
- Time zone: UTC+01:00 (CET)
  - Summer (DST): UTC+02:00 (CEST)
- Postal codes: 18320
- Dialling codes: 038225
- Vehicle registration: NVP
- Website: www.ribnitz-damgarten.de

Schlemmin is a municipality in the Vorpommern-Rügen district, in Mecklenburg-Vorpommern, Germany.
