= Bella Tola =

Mountain in Switzerland

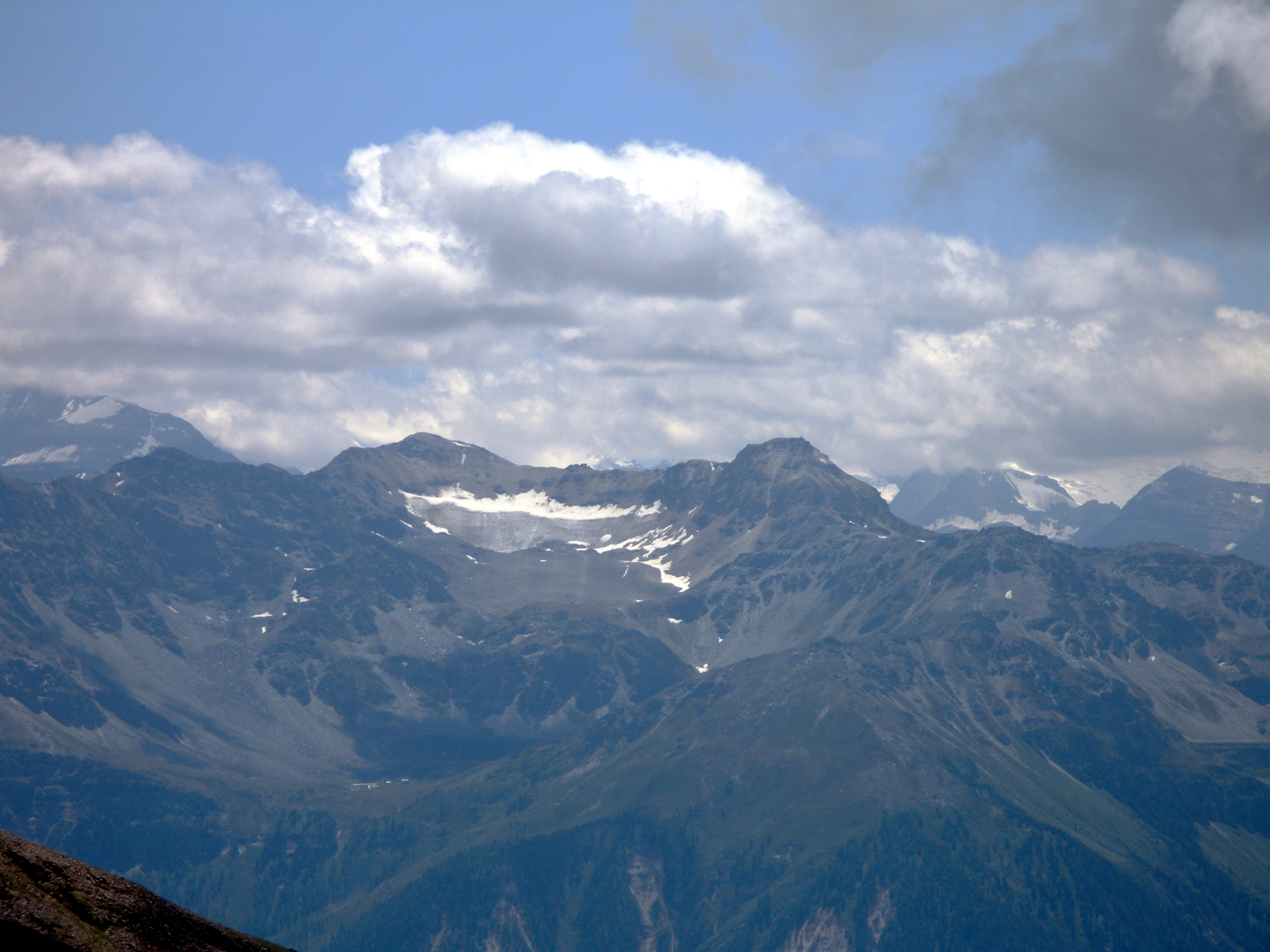
- The Bella Tola (centre left) from the Torrenthorn (north side)

Highest point
- Elevation: 3,025 m (9,925 ft)
- Prominence: 235 m (771 ft)
- Isolation: 3.84 km (2.39 mi)
- Coordinates: 46°13′53″N 7°38′46″E

Geography
- Location within Switzerland
- Location: Valais, Switzerland
- Parent range: Pennine Alps

The Bella Tola is a mountain of the Swiss Pennine Alps, overlooking Saint-Luc in the canton of Valais. With an elevation of 3,025 metres above sea level, it is the highest summit of the subrange north of the Meidpass (2,790 m). The Bella Tola lies near the northern end of the Weisshorn chain.

On the north side lies a small glacier named Bella Tola Gletscher.

The summit of the Bella Tola is a popular vantage point, it can be reached by several trails. According to multiple sources the small glacier named Bella Tola Gletscher has completely melted

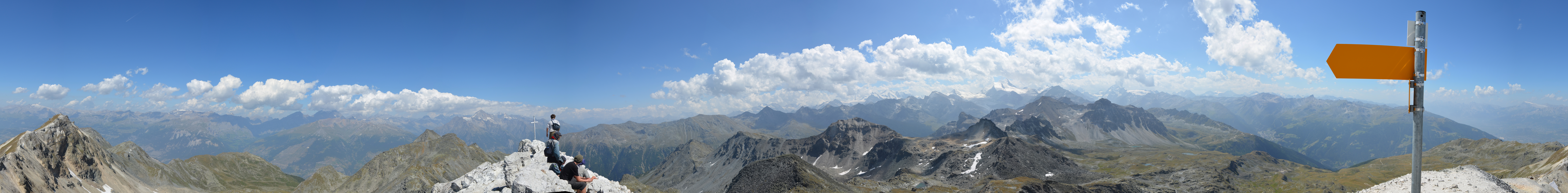
Bella Tola at noon
