= Grand River land dispute =

Dispute over Indigenous land rights in Canada

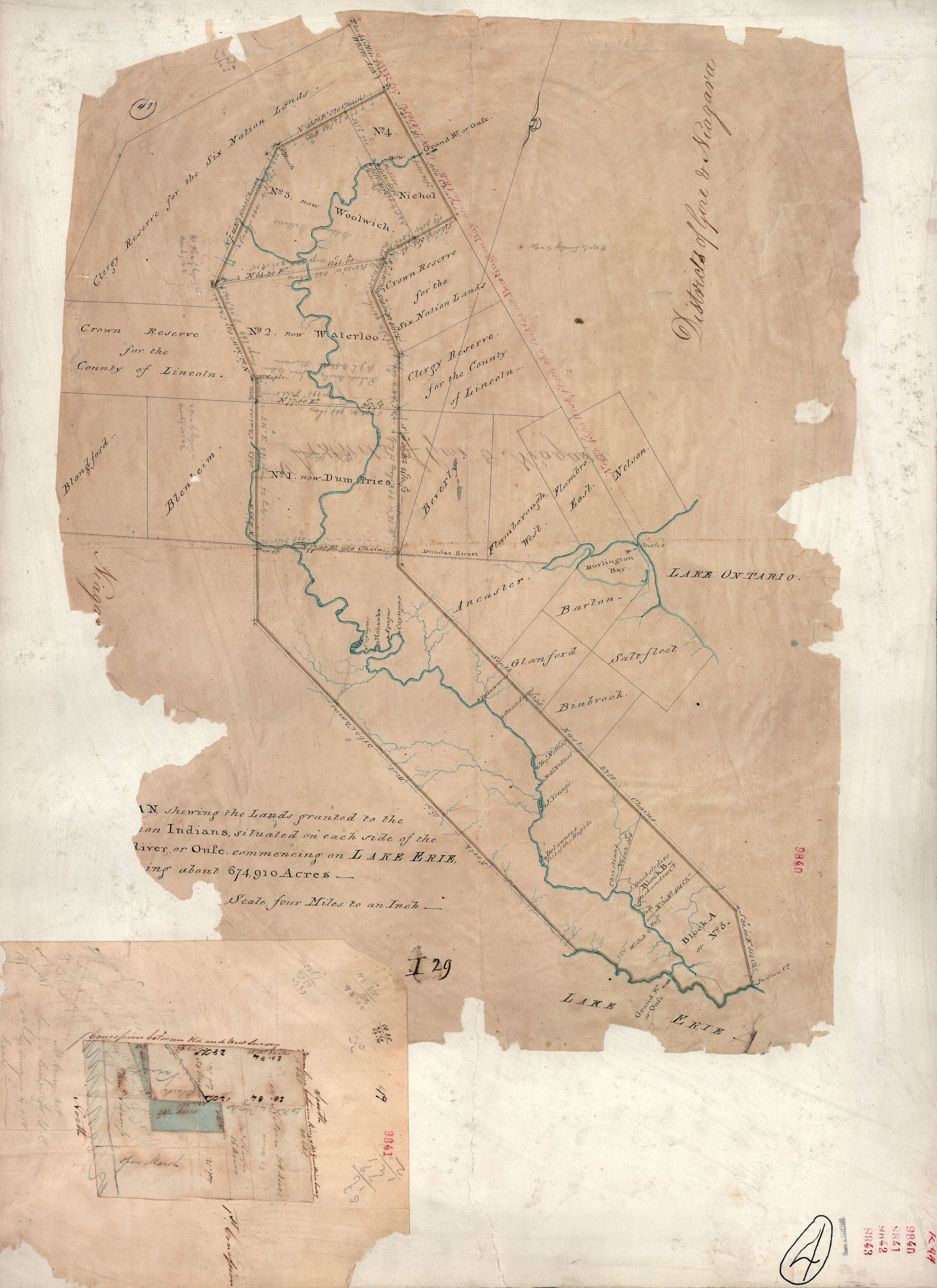
Thomas Ridout survey of 1821

The Grand River land dispute, also known as the Caledonia land dispute, is an ongoing dispute between the Six Nations of the Grand River and the Government of Canada. It is focused on land along the length of the Grand River in Ontario known as the Haldimand Tract, a 385,000-hectare (950,000-acre) tract that was granted to Indigenous allies of the British Crown in 1784 to make up for territorial losses suffered as a result of the American Revolutionary War and the Treaty of Paris (1783). The Six Nations were granted the land in perpetuity and allege that lands were improperly sold, leased or given away by various Canadian governments, leaving only 5 per cent of the original lands under Six Nations control. The Six Nations also allege that money owed to the Six Nations from leases and loans on much of the tract have not been paid or were redirected into government coffers.

The dispute has been the subject of many formal negotiations under the land claims process since the 1970s and several instances of direct action in the form of protests, blockades, and occupations. Formal negotiations have broken down, and the dispute is before the courts. The Government of Canada's policy to extinguish aboriginal title as a condition of settlement is considered unacceptable by the Six Nations. The Six Nations are seeking monies owing and ongoing payments for leased lands and the return of lands improperly transferred.

The dispute came to wide attention in Canada in 2006 when the Six Nations formally reactivated litigation initially brought in 1995 against Canada and Ontario. Protesters from the Six Nations of the Grand River demonstrated on a parcel of land in Caledonia, a community within the municipality of Haldimand County, roughly 20 kilometres (12 miles) southwest of Hamilton. Soon after this demonstration, the demonstrators took control of the disputed land, the planned site of a subdivision known as "Douglas Creek Estates". The land, along with all of Caledonia, is part of the "Haldimand Tract". The Government of Ontario compensated the developer and stopped the development, holding the land for planned negotiations.

In February and March 2020, the dispute once again entered public consciousness with Mohawk protesters blockading Highway 6 as part of the 2020 Canadian pipeline and railway protests in solidarity with the Wetʼsuwetʼen, and later with the occupation of the site of another planned subdivision in Caledonia, "McKenzie Meadows". The protestors have called the area "1492 Land Back Lane". Calling themselves "land defenders", the protestors have refused to leave despite being ordered to by an Ontario court.

== Background ==
=== 18th century ===
- May 22, 1784 – Frederick Haldimand purchases land along the Grand River from the Mississauga nation.
- October 25, 1784 – In return for military support provided by member states of the Six Nations during the American Revolution, the British Crown provides these nations with territory to replace lands ceded south of the Great Lakes via the Haldimand Proclamation. A contingent of Haudenosaunee people led by Brant decides to settle at the Grand River. The nations' new, shared territory extends 6 miles (9.7 km) from either side of the Grand River, from its source to its termination at Lake Erie.
- 1791 – Sir John Johnson, who had been placed in charge of managing the resettlement of the Haudenosaunee, notices an error regarding the northern boundary of the Haldimand Tract. He found that the headwaters of the Grand River did not fall within the land purchased from the Mississaugas in 1784. The Crown's surveyor Augustus Jones redefines the boundary of the Six Nations' parcel, establishing straight-lined boundaries, including Jones Baseline, which provided the northern boundary of the newly defined parcel, around the later location of Guelph.
- December 1792 – The Crown purchases the remainder of the land included in the Haldimand Grant (i.e., up to the actual headwaters of the Grand River) from the Mississaugas, but does not transfer it to Six Nations.
- January 14, 1793 – Lieutenant-Governor John Graves Simcoe confirms the grant with a limited deed, known as the Simcoe Patent, or the Crown Grant to the Six Nations, or the Haldimand Tract, no. 4. The Simcoe Patent limits the Haldimand Tract to 111,000 hectares (270,000 acres) for the exclusive use of the Six Nations, leaving the rest of the land available to be leased, surrendered, or sold by the Haudenosaunee to the Crown. It does not address the issue of the territory around the headwaters. Brant and the other Six Nations chiefs reject the patent and claim that they are not bound by it.
- 1796 – The Six Nations grant chief Joseph Brant the power of attorney to sell off some of the land and invest the proceeds to provide annuity for tribal members, who are struggling to survive in the new settlements. The Crown initially opposes the sales but eventually concedes.
- c. 1794–6 – Joseph Brant begins selling land to private interests, having reached a deal with Peter Russell that allowed him to sell and lease the land so long as it is offered first to the Crown. Ultimately, he sells 381,480 acres (1,543.8 km^{2}), an area comprising the northern half of the reserve, for £85,332. The interest on the annuity promises an income of £5,119 per year, far more than any other Iroquois people had received up until that point.
- February 5, 1798 – The land sold by Brant to the Crown is parcelled off into six blocks and sold to private land speculators, per arrangements made by Brant. These blocks later developed into towns as follows:
  - Block No. 1 – Township of Dumfries (later North Dumfries and South Dumfries Township, incorporated in 1819)
  - Block No. 2 – Waterloo Township (incorporated in 1816)
  - Block No. 3 – Pilkington Township in Wellington County, and Woolwich Township (incorporated in 1816)
  - Block No. 4 – Nichol Township in Wellington County (opened for settlement in 1822)
  - Block No. 5 – Moulton Township in Haldimand County
  - Block No. 6 – Canborough Township in Haldimand County

=== 19th century ===
- 1801 – All of the land speculators have fallen behind in their payments due to being unable to sell farm-size lots to settlers fast enough to keep up.
- 1828 – Nearly two-thirds of the Grand River territory has been sold, leased, or occupied by squatters.
- 1835 – The Crown approaches the Six Nations about developing the Port Dover-Hamilton Plank road (now Highway 6) and the surrounding area. The Six Nations agree to lease half a mile of land on each side for the road but did not surrender the land. Lieutenant-Governor John Colborne agrees to the lease but later, his successor, Sir Francis Bond Head, does not.
- 1840 – The government recommends that a reserve of approximately 8,093 hectares (20,000 acres) be established on the south side of the Grand River and the rest sold or leased to the Crown to protect them from encroaching squatters.
- January 18, 1841 – According to the Crown, the Six Nations council agrees to surrender for sale all the lands outside those set aside for a reserve, on the agreement that the government would sell the land and invest the money for them.
- February 4, 1841 – The Six Nations petition against the surrender of land, saying the chiefs had been intimidated and deceived and they had agreed only to lease the land.
- July 7, 1841 – There is another petition against the surrender.
- 1843 – A further petition to the Crown says the Six Nations need a reserve of 22,000 hectares (54,000 acres) and want to keep and lease a tier of lots on each side of Plank Road (Highway 6) and several other tracts of land within the territory laid out by the Haldimand Proclamation.
- 1843 – Plank Road is completed, which helps to "spur the growth of Caledonia but also the sale of Six Nations lands."
- December 18, 1844 – A surrender is signed by 47 Six Nations chiefs that authorizes the sale of land to build Plank Road.
- 1845 – Starting this year, despite the protests of Six Nations citizens, the Crown sells Plank Road and surrounding lands to third parties.
- May 15, 1848 – The land that would later be the site of the development of Douglas Creek Estates is sold to George Marlot Ryckman for 57 pounds and 10 shillings; a Crown deed of title is issued to him.
- 1850 – The Crown passes a proclamation setting the extent of reserve lands to about 19,000 hectares (47,000 acres), which is agreed to by the Six Nations chiefs.

=== 20th century ===
- 1924 – Under the Indian Act, the Government of Canada establishes an elected band government on the Six Nations reserve, known today as the Six Nations of the Grand River Elected Council. The establishment of a band council is characterised by some as a coup, not least of all due to the use of the Royal Canadian Mounted Police to ensure the transition of power at Six Nations.
- 1931 – The Statute of Westminster is put into effect; the parliament of the United Kingdom relinquishes the ability to legislate on behalf of Canada. All Canadian First Nations affairs are now fully within the jurisdiction of the Canadian Crown.
- 1974 – The Six Nations Land Claims Research Office (SNLCRO) is created by Six Nations to pursue the terms laid out in the Haldimand Proclamation.
- 1974–1995 – SNLCRO submits 29 separate land claims to the Specific Claims Branch of Indigenous and Northern Affairs Canada.
- 1995 – After only one of the 29 submitted land claims is resolved, the Government of Canada closes the rest (including those already validated for negotiation), because they receive notice of pending litigation from Six Nations.

== Canadian National Railway Settlement ==
In 1980, the Six Nations Council, along with SNLCRO, submitted a claim to Indigenous and Northern Affairs Canada against Canadian National Railway's unauthorized use of reserve land for a stretch of rail that runs along the eastern end of the reserve (near the site of the later Douglas Creek Estates dispute). The First Nation eventually accepted a settlement in 1987 that consisted of $610,000 in the form of three parcels of land added to the reserve, which added approximately 104,883 hectares (259,170 acres). The council also retained the right to purchase said railway lands if they were not used for railway purposes and were re-acquired by Canada.

== Douglas Creek Estates (Kanonhstaton) ==
Douglas Creek Estates occupation
- Part of indigenous specific land claims in Canada
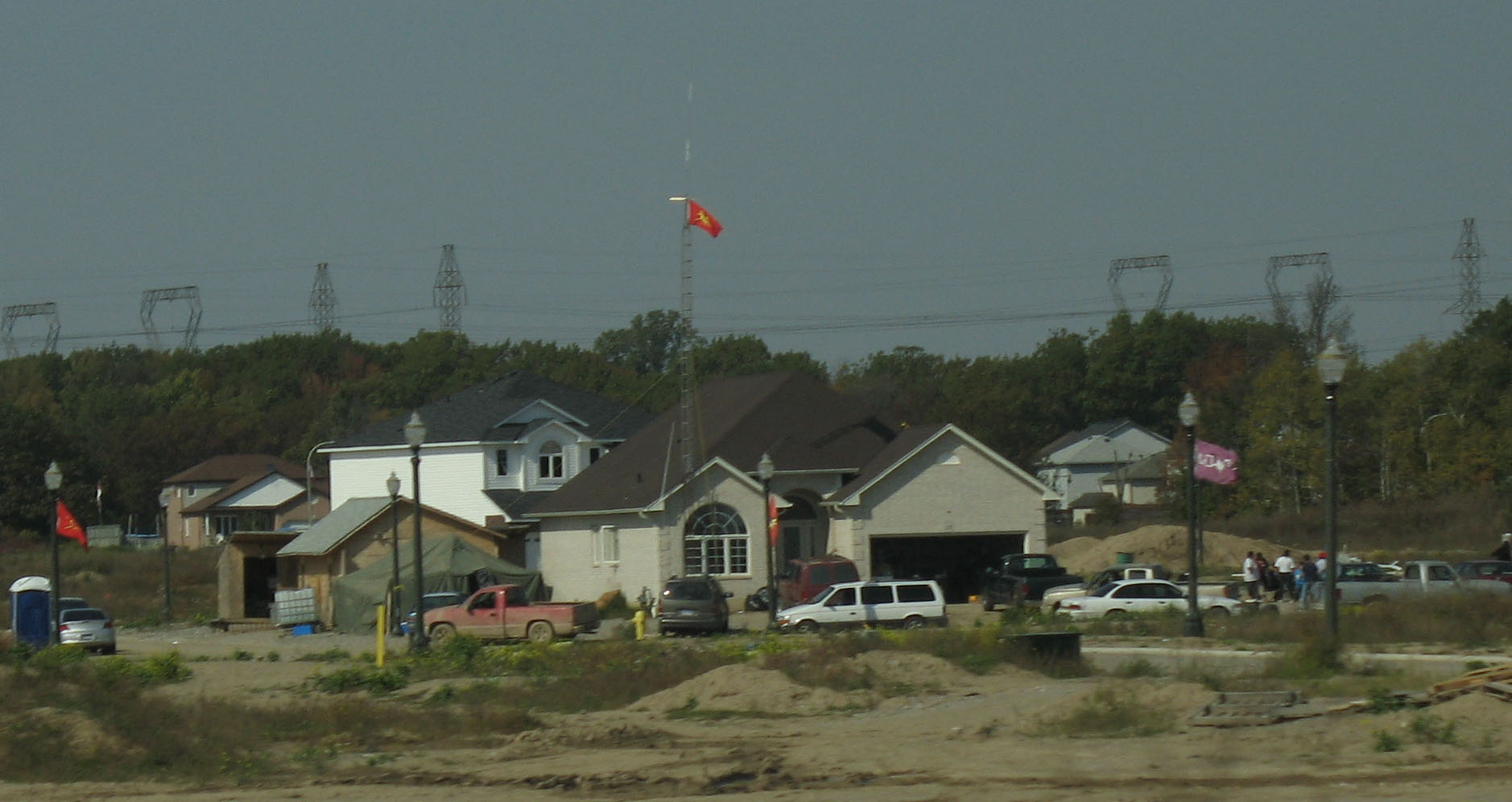
- An occupied house on the Douglas Creek Estates
- Date: February 28 – August 27, 2006
- Location: Canada
- Caused by: Development of Douglas Creek Estates subdivision near Caledonia, Ontario and Six Nations of the Grand River
- Result: Blockades removed, development halted and land bought by Ontario, protesters allowed to stay, class action lawsuits filed by Caledonia citizens against OPP and provincial government

Parties
Indigenous protesters and allies: Six Nations of the Grand River; Mohawks of the Bay of Quinte; Haudenosaunee Confederacy Chiefs Council	Canadian government and police: Haldimand County; Ontario Provincial Police; Government of Ontario	Counter-protestors: Local activists and vigilantes

Lead figures
David General; Allen McNaughton (Tekarihoken)	Marie Trainer; Dalton McGuinty; David Peterson	Gary McHale

Casualties
- Injuries: Several, notably Sam Gualtieri
- Arrested: Several

In 1992, Henco Industries Ltd. purchased 40 hectares (99 acres) of land for what it would later call the Douglas Creek Estates. The proposed subdivision was set to be located southwest of Caledonia, between Argyle Street South, 6th Line, the CN rail line, and the houses along Thistlemoor Drive.^{:192} That land was part of an existing land claim submitted by the Six Nations Elected Council; the claim had been closed by 1995. In March of that year, the Six Nations sued the federal and provincial governments in the Ontario Superior Court of Justice over the developers' purchase of the land. The lawsuit is an accounting claim for "all assets which were not received but ought to have been received, managed or held by the Crown for the benefit of the Six Nations." The case was openly litigated until 2004, when it was paused for "exploratory" negotiated settlement talks with the federal government. These talks were never pursued, due to the Douglas Creek Estates conflict in 2006.

Regarding their right to purchase the land, Henco argued that the Six Nations had surrendered their rights to the land in 1841 and Henco had purchased it from the Government of Canada. The Six Nations, however, maintained that their title to the land was never relinquished, as their chiefs protested the 1841 surrender and sent a petition to the government arguing against the terms.

In July 2005, the subdivision plan for Douglas Creek Estates was registered, with title to the property guaranteed by the province of Ontario.

Starting in February 2006, community members from Six Nations occupied the site of the proposed development, which they named in Mohawk Kanonhstaton ([ganũhˈsdaːdũ], English: "the protected place"). Direct action on the part of protesters over the years included blockade of roads and rail lines, damage to a power station resulting in an area blackout and more than $1 million in repairs, and low levels of violence from both sides, as well as isolated, more serious attacks. The federal government halted negotiations at times because of the protesters' actions.

As protests continued, on June 12, 2006, more than 400 area residents and businesses filed a class-action suit against the Government of Ontario for its "failure to protect them adequately". This was settled in July 2011, with the government paying CA$20 million to class members. By the end of 2011, several criminal cases related to assaults had been prosecuted.

During the continuing dispute, on June 16, 2006, the Government of Ontario announced it had bought the disputed tract from the developer and would hold it in trust until negotiations settled the claim. Talks began, including the Confederacy chiefs, but were put on hold in 2009 when litigation of the 1995 lawsuit was resumed. The trial is anticipated to start sometime in early 2024.

=== 2005 ===
==== October ====
- October 25 – Day-long shutdown of Douglas Creek Estates construction by Six Nations’ Land Claims Awareness Group, led by Dawn Smith and Janie Jamieson.
- October 26 - Six Nations Elected Council Chief David General writes to Henco, expressing concerns about the development proceeding on disputed lands.

=== 2006 ===
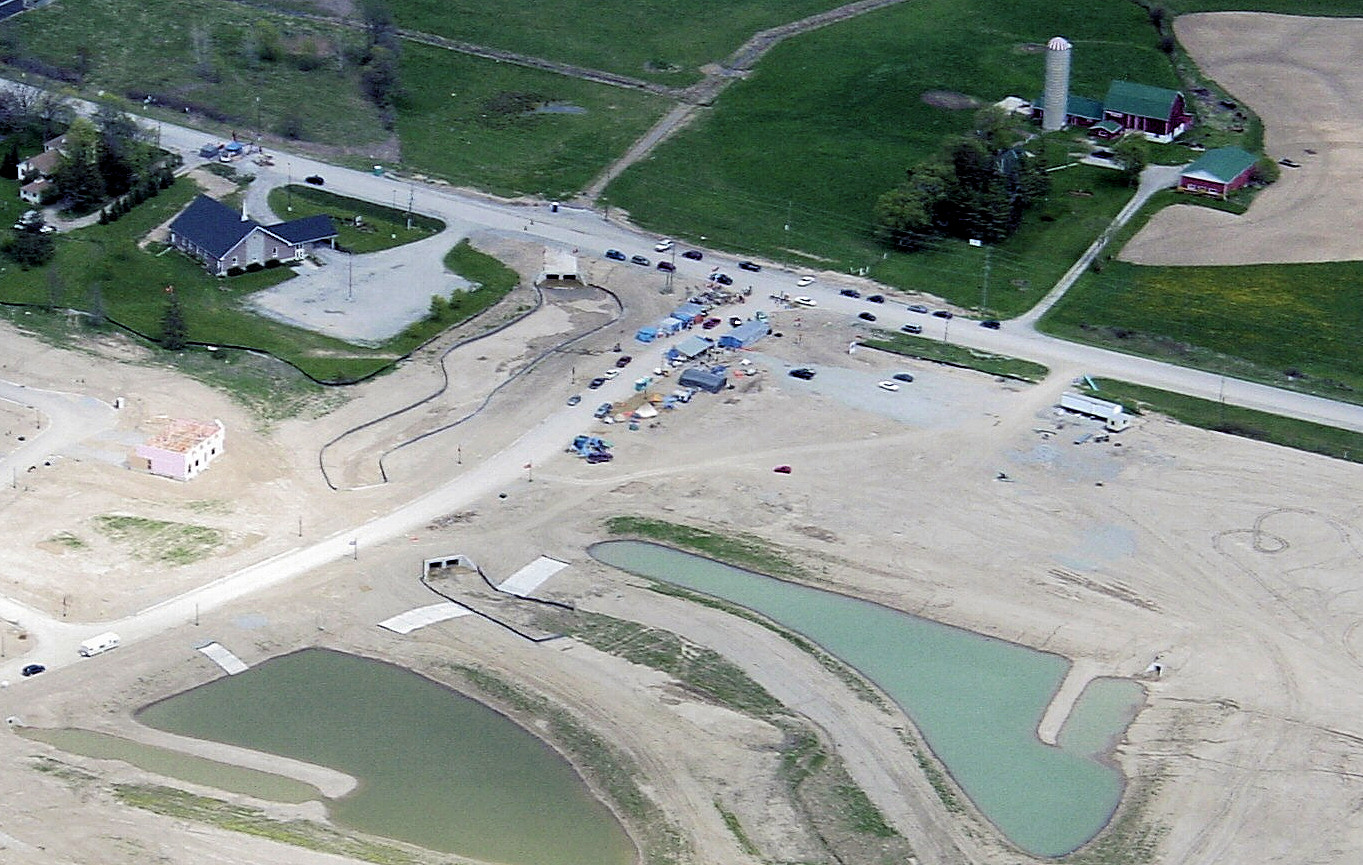
Occupation of Douglas Creek Estates

==== February ====
- February 28 – A group of community members from Six Nations erect tents, a tipi and a wooden building on the proposed development site.

==== March ====
- March 3 – Henco Industries, the developer of the land, obtains an injunction from Justice Matheson, ordering the protesters off the land.
- March 5 - The Sheriff tries to deliver Justice Matheson's order to the protesters late Saturday evening. They do not accept the injunction. One of the protesters, Dawn Smith, burns the order stating "I am an ally to you, not a subject."
- March 9 – At Henco's request, motions judge Justice Marshall makes the March 3 court injunction permanent. He also adjourns Henco's contempt motion against the First Nations protesters to March 16.
- March 17 – Justice Marshall makes a finding of civil contempt and orders the Sheriff to go to Douglas Creek Estates, read aloud the new contempt order, giving protesters until March 22 to leave the site.
- March 22 – Protesters continue to occupy the site beyond court-ordered deadline.
- March 28 – Justice Marshall issues new order of criminal contempt and warrant of arrest for protesters blockading Douglas Creek Estates.

==== April ====
- April 4 – Several hundred people, including some who had bought homes in Douglas Creek Estates, gather in Caledonia to demand an end to the occupation.
- April 19 – Ontario Premier Dalton McGuinty says the land dispute will be settled in a "peaceful manner".
- April 20 – The Ontario Provincial Police (OPP) conduct a pre-dawn raid at 4:30 am. 21 protesters are arrested over the course of the day, with 16 during the initial raid.
- April 20 – Several hundred people from Six Nations, some of whom are masked and armed with bats, axes and hockey sticks, return to the site in the morning, and a further busload of supporters from other reserves arrive in the evening. The police retreat and the protesters reclaim the site and set up roadblocks along the access street. During the evening, the protesters put hundreds of tires across the highway, and light them on fire. In addition, they set fire to a wooden bridge over the nearby railway tracks. Firefighters are unable to extinguish both fires because the fire chief is concerned the OPP are not able to adequately protect his men. Several boxes of documents from the land developer's office inside a model home are taken, and some are tossed into a bonfire.
- April 20 – In solidarity with the protesters at Kanonhstaton, a group of Mohawks raise a banner and Mohawk flags on a bridge near Montreal, blocking traffic for about a half-hour.
- April 21 – Several members of the Mohawks of the Bay of Quinte First Nation light bonfires by the CN rail line near Tyendinaga Mohawk Territory. CN freight trains are blocked, and Via Rail announces that its trains will be replaced by shuttle buses. In the afternoon, CN announces that it has obtained an injunction to clear blockage from its rail lines.
- April 21 – Talks begin between the government of Canada, the government of Ontario, the Six Nations Elected Council, and the Haudenosaunee Confederacy Chiefs Council, seeking to resolve the dispute. This is the first time since the establishment of the elected council in 1924 that the federal government has negotiated with the Confederacy Chiefs.
- April 22 – The parties sign an agreement to continue talking, with a view of settling the land claim. They agree to each appoint a representative within two weeks.

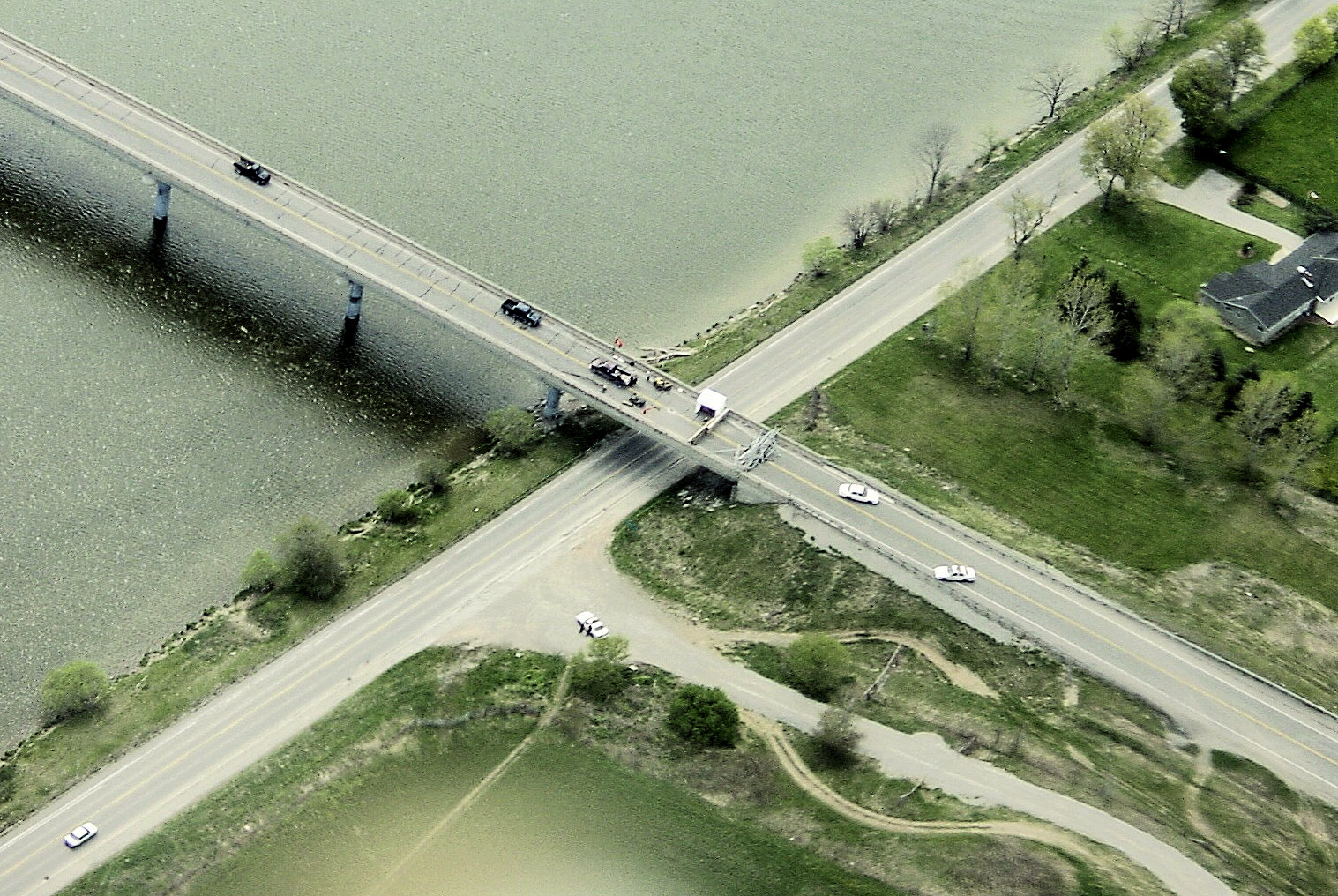
Blockade of Highway 6 over the Grand River by Six Nations protestors

- April 24 – About 3000 Caledonia residents hold a rally demanding an end to the occupation. Later in the evening, several hundred residents confront OPP and Six Nations occupiers at the blockade.
- April 25 – Haldimand County Mayor Marie Trainer says in an interview with CBC Newsworld that the residents of the town are being hurt economically by the protest and "don't have money coming in automatically every month". The protesters take this as an insult, believing she implied they all received provincial welfare. Trainer denies this, but does not clarify what she did intend by the comment. The municipal council quickly distances itself from her comments, voting to replace her with deputy mayor Bob Patterson as their spokesperson on the issue.
- April 28 – Caledonia residents once again gather to demand an end to the blockade.
- April 30 – The provincial government appoints former premier David Peterson to help negotiate a settlement in the conflict.

==== May ====
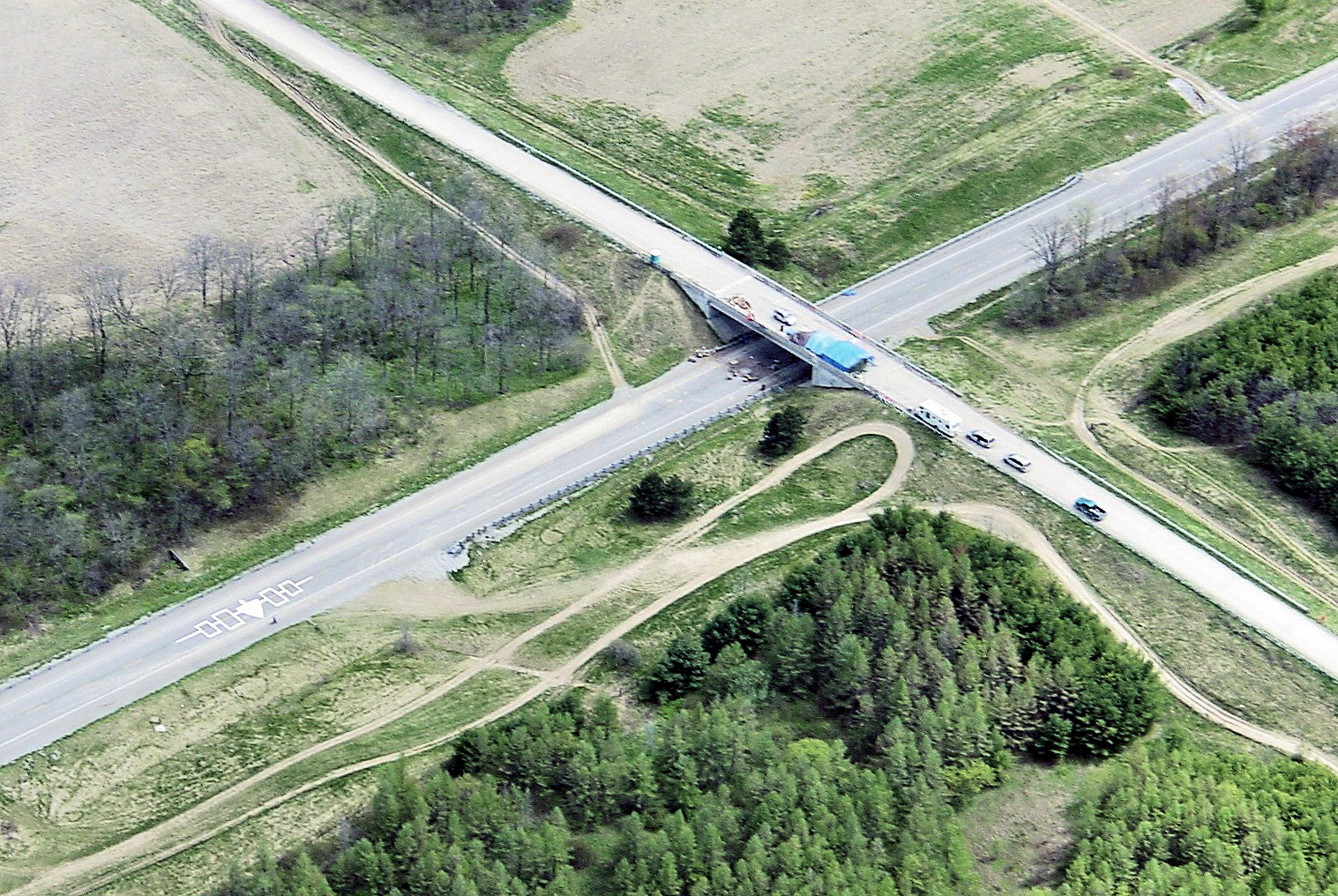
Blockade of Highway 6 and 7th Line by Six Nations protestors

- May 16 – Protesters open one lane of Argyle St. after an accident closed McKenzie Rd., the main detour route into Caledonia from points south of Town. After the accident is cleared, protesters close Argyle St. again, though they agree to let emergency vehicles through.
- May 19 – In a letter to the Haudenosaunee Confederacy Council of Chiefs, the Government of Ontario announces that there will be an indefinite moratorium on construction on the Douglas Creek Estates site.
- May 19 – Several Caledonia residents establish a counter-blockade on Argyle St., to prevent the protesters from accessing the site.
- May 22 – Early in the morning, native protesters removed their blockade on Argyle St. Traffic remained blocked by the Caledonia residents' counter-blockade.
- May 22 – Around 2:00 pm, protesters re-establish a barricade across Argyle St., using an electrical transmission tower and two backhoes, which dig a trench across the road. The two sides face each other separated by dozens of OPP officers. Scuffles including fistfights and verbal assaults continued to break out throughout the day, resulting in injuries to natives, residents and police.
- May 22 – A truck crashes through the gates of a hydro substation, setting it on fire and damaging two transformers. This causes a blackout throughout Haldimand and parts of Norfolk counties, as well as over $1 million in damages.
- May 22 – Six Nations Confederacy Chief Allen McNaughton (Tekarihoken) says, "As the world has seen, our protest has been firm but peaceful. Our people are responding without weapons, using only their bodies to assert that we are a sovereign people with a long history and that we cannot be intimidated."
- May 22 – A state of emergency is declared late in the evening due to the escalation of violence and the power-outage.
- May 22 – In Saskatchewan, Cree protesters blockade the Yellowhead Highway near North Battleford in solidarity with the Six Nations protesters in Caledonia. Following negotiations with the Royal Canadian Mounted Police, the roadblock is removed after about two hours.
- May 23 – At 1:30 pm, protesters offer to remove the barricade across Argyle St. as long as the counter-barricade is removed as well. By 3:20 pm the road is fully open to traffic.
- May 24 – Power is restored to Caledonia during the morning hours.
- May 27 – Power is restored to all areas affected by the blackout.

==== June ====
- June 5 – Six Nations protesters and Caledonia residents clash on the town's main street after a police cruiser drives through an area protesters consider "restricted" the night before.
- June 9 – Two elderly Simcoe residents driving by the occupation site get into a verbal altercation with protesters. The couple are followed and surrounded in their car in a parking lot away from the occupation site. Protesters jump onto the vehicle attempting to get inside. According to residents, the police do not intervene. Another account from the residents recalls an OPP officer restraining a protester after attempting to grab the couples' steering wheel through the window. Following the altercation in the parking lot, more than 300 Caledonia residents gather at the Canadian Tire lot. Moving to a place near the construction site, some clash with OPP officers in full riot gear.
- June 9 – Two CH News camera operators are surrounded by Six Nations protesters and assaulted when they refuse to hand over video tape containing footage of the protesters swarming the elderly couple's car One reporter is later hospitalized with a head injury. Caledonia residents and the cameramen say the OPP did not assist the men. However, the Hamilton Spectator reports that Lynda Powless, publisher of the Turtle Island News and reporter with the Hamilton Spectator, has produced photos which show OPP officers intervening.
- June 9 – A U.S. Border Patrol vehicle, with agents reportedly observing the OPP's management of the crisis, is swarmed by Six Nations protesters. Two occupants are immediately forced out of the vehicle and a protester climbs in. A third OPP officer is injured as he tries to escape out the back door. The car is driven directly at him and he is narrowly pulled to safety by onlookers. Protesters seized sensitive OPP documents from the vehicle, which included information collected by officers surveilling protesters, including personal information of OPP, U.S. Border Patrol, and protesters, as well as documents on an unrelated human smuggling investigation. Documents were given to Powless who stated to the Hamilton Spectator that she photocopied and returned them to protesters. The vehicle and original documents are later returned.
- June 9 – Arrest warrants are issued on charges related to this incident for Albert Douglas, 30; Skyler Williams, 22; Arnold Douglas, 61; and Ken Hill, 47, all of Ohsweken; Audra Ann Taillefer, 45, of Victoria, B.C., and Trevor Miller, 30. They face a total of 14 charges including attempted murder, assaulting a police officer, forcible confinement, theft of a motor vehicle, dangerous driving, assault and intimidation.

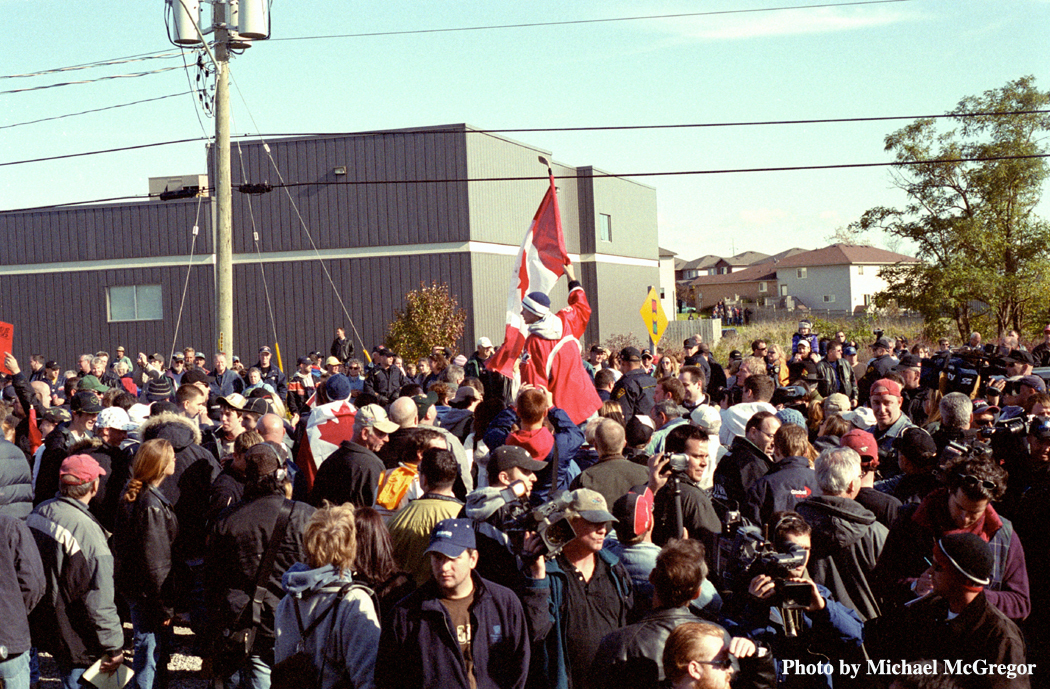
Counter-protesters, onlookers, media gather at the OPP line after the October 15 "March for Freedom"

- June 12 – A class-action lawsuit is filed by 440 residents, 400 businesses and a handful of sub-contractors, alleging negligence and malfeasance for the failure of the provincial government and the OPP to properly protect citizens who lived near Douglas Creek Estates.
- June 12 – Ontario Premier Dalton McGuinty calls off negotiations with protesters at the Douglas Creek Estates site, saying that public safety has been compromised by the violence on June 9. He says the province will return to the table only when the barricades come down and native leaders assist police in finding seven suspects in connection with earlier incidents.
- June 15 – Negotiations with the provincial government resume after one of the blockades is removed.
- June 16 – The Ontario provincial government announces that it has bought the disputed site from Henco Industries, the company which had sought to develop the land. It simultaneously announces $1 million in additional compensation for businesses in the Caledonia area adversely affected by the protest. The provincial government is holding the land in trust until an agreement can be reached.
- June 16 – Audra Ann Taillefer, 45, of Victoria, B.C., is taken into custody on charges of robbery and intimidation, stemming from the June 9 incident involving a Simcoe couple.

==== August ====
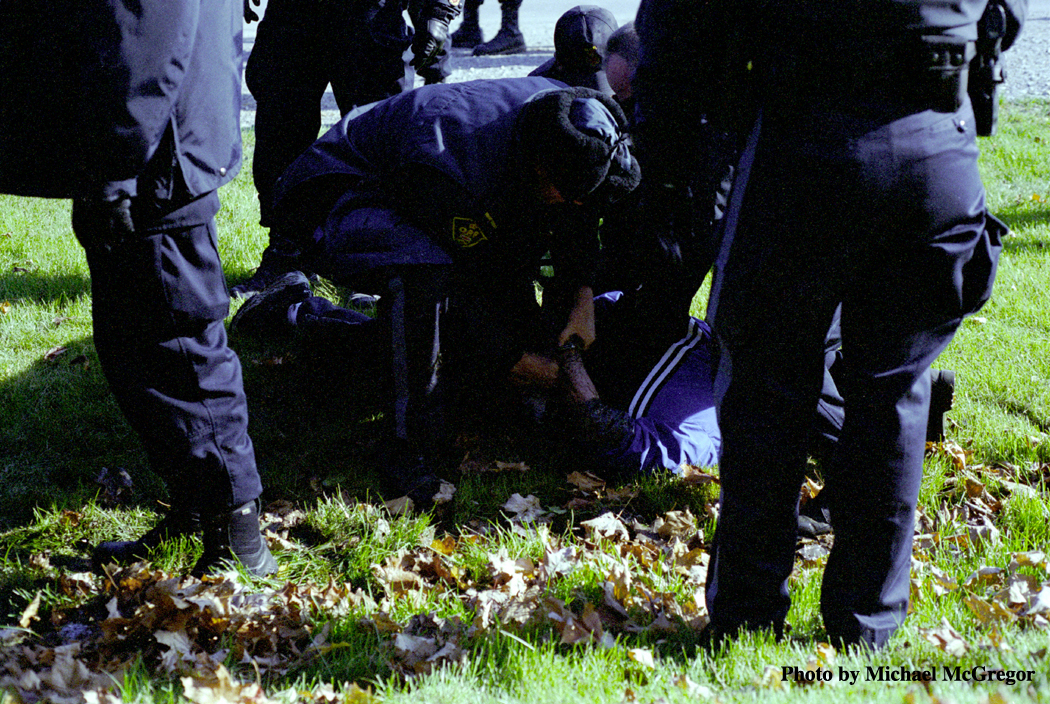
A Caledonian protester is arrested by OPP officers after attempting to breach the police line near the site of the disputed land on October 15

- August 7 – Native protesters and non-natives begin throwing rocks and golf balls while shouting insults at each other. Approximately 100 people take part in the violent event, which lasts nearly 3 hours. OPP spokesman Constable Dennis Harwood says to The National Post, "There was some property damage, but no injuries were sustained."
- August 8 – At a hearing in a Cayuga courtroom, Superior Court Justice David Marshall orders the Ontario provincial government to break off negotiations with the Six Nations community until the protesters have left the disputed land.
- August 11 – The Government of Ontario announces that it is appealing Superior Court Justice David Marshall's ruling to break off negotiations. The Government says it is seeking a stay of Justice Marshall's order, so that negotiations may resume while the appeal is being prepared. A court date of August 22, 2006 is set in the Court of Appeal for Ontario, where a 3-member panel will determine whether or not to grant a stay.
- August 27 – The judges of the three-member panel of Ontario Court of Appeal dealing with the Provincial government's appeal rule that the protesters can stay on the disputed site, writing the following:

The province owns Douglas Creek Estates. It does not claim that the protesters are on its property unlawfully. It does not seek a court order removing them. It is content to let them remain. We see no reason why it should not be permitted to do so. [...] Despite what Justice Marshall said in his reasons of August 8, 2006, he did not include in his final order a direction that the parties cease negotiations. [...] Thus in our view the parties should be free to continue to negotiate if they choose to do so without fear of being in breach or contempt of a court order. To be clear, the order of Justice Marshall does not preclude continued negotiations.

==== October ====
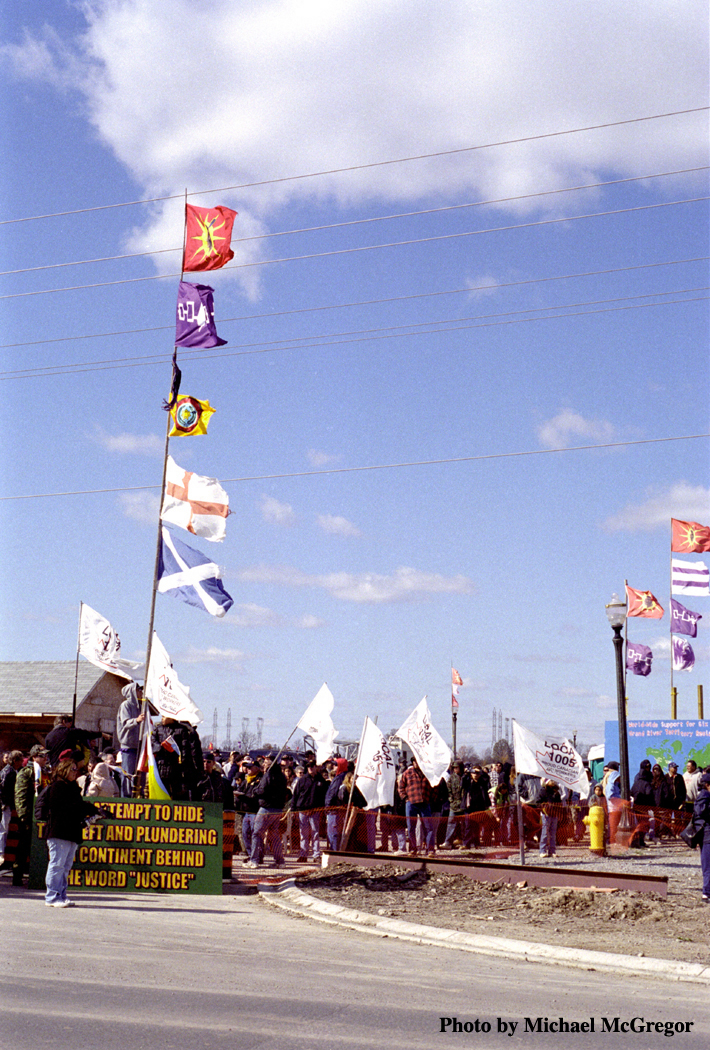
The entrance to the disputed land during the October 15 "Potluck for Peace" held by the people on the site and their supporters.

- October 15 – A rally organized by resident Gary McHale attracts an estimated 400 participants. Dubbed the "March for Freedom", the rally is blocked from the main entrance to the Douglas Creek Estates by the OPP. Instead, the rally goes to the grounds of the school that borders the site. McHale encourages the rally members to control their tempers. Meanwhile, some Six Nations people and their Native and non-Native supporters gather together for a "Potluck for Peace" on the contested site.

==== December ====
- December 16 – OPP arrest Gary McHale for breach of the peace for organizing a rally in Caledonia.

=== Further developments ===
On January 27, 2007, a report from the Department of Justice to the Six Nations Confederacy stated that their land claims would not hold up in court.

On April 12, 2007, Haldimand County Mayor Marie Trainer said she received an e-mail from OPP commissioner Julian Fantino implying that the town was encouraging "divisive rallies" at the occupation site. He added that if any officers are harmed, he would not support a renewal of the town's policing contract in 2008 and would back any lawsuit brought against the town by individual officers. An OPP spokesperson told The Hamilton Spectator that the OPP would neither confirm nor deny the authenticity of the e-mail because it was meant to be private correspondence.

On February 22, 2010, Marie Trainer said that the province was leaning towards giving the Douglas Creek Estates to the Six Nations Band Council, but that she expected it to be some time before a formal decision would be reached.

In June 2014, the Haldimand County council ordered the removal of a native-made blockade in Caledonia.

In November 2014, the Haudenosaunee Confederacy Chiefs Council completed construction of a fence and gate surrounding the Douglas Creek Estates site to prevent trespassing on the disputed land.

The only house at Douglas Creek Estates that had survived the violent confrontations in 2006 nearly burned to the ground overnight on the morning of November 15, 2016.

=== Allegations of police inaction ===
Throughout the occupation and protests, many Caledonia residents complained that they had been subject to threats and violence from Native protesters and that the Ontario Provincial Police (OPP) failed to take any action to protect them. David Brown, who lived with his wife near the disputed area at the time, testified in court in November 2009 that he was required to carry a native-issued passport and needed approval from the protesters to enter his own house. He also claimed that after arriving "after curfew" one day, he was denied entry and jailed by the OPP when he caused trouble by ignoring the natives. Brown alleged that Native protesters threatened and harassed him repeatedly, and that rocks and mud were thrown at his family and their home. Brown and his wife sought $7 million in a civil lawsuit against the OPP on the basis that the police did nothing to protect him and his family during the occupation.

In response to Brown's claims, Crown lawyer David Felicient stated that the situation "must be understood against the backdrop of the unique character of Aboriginal occupations and protests" and that the OPP were prevented from taking action due to "policy implications." Felicient also suggested that Brown had fabricated portions of his testimony to draw attention to his lawsuit. When Felicient asked why Brown kept a loaded shotgun, Brown responded that "We were doing what we had to do to stay alive. I had no protection from our government. I felt that I needed to protect my wife and my family."

In court testimony, OPP Inspector Brian Haggith stated that the Native protesters "set up a checkpoint... Almost like they were entering another country," and that community lost confidence in the OPP's ability to protect them. Haggith also testified that when natives set fire to a wooden bridge in town, the fire department withdrew from fighting the blaze when threatened by protesters. The fire chief told the OPP he did not believe they would protect him or his men. In addition, an electrical substation was destroyed, causing more than $1 million in damage and a blackout, when a truck crashed through its gates and was left ablaze. Haggith said that there was little response from the police. Inspector Haggith also testified that he had asked for a change in policy at a subsequent meeting he had with his OPP superiors, but that his request was denied.

On June 15, 2009, some Caledonia residents announced the formation of an unarmed "militia" to enforce laws they felt the Ontario Provincial Police had failed to uphold. Six Nations Councillor Claudine VanEvery-Albert, along with OPP spokesperson Constable Paula Wright both spoke out against the formation of a militia, and three days later, Ontario Community Safety Minister Rick Bartolucci called it a "dumb idea."

On July 8, 2011, Ontario Attorney General Chris Bentley announced a settlement of $20 million ending a class-action lawsuit which had been filed by 440 residents, 400 businesses and a handful of sub-contractors, which claimed negligence and malfeasance on the part of the provincial government and the OPP for failing to properly protect citizens who lived near Douglas Creek Estates. Some residents continued independent lawsuits. In 2018, a lawyer who oversaw the class-action lawsuit by Caledonia residents was charged with fraud.

=== Assault on Sam Gualtieri ===
On September 13, 2007, builder Sam Gualtieri was attacked and seriously injured in a confrontation with native protesters at the Stirling South subdivision development in Caledonia. Following a brief occupation two weeks prior, a small group of natives had occupied the property that morning, and the confrontation was going to end peacefully in the afternoon before Gualtieri arrived and clashed with the young protesters. On December 2, 2011, Richard Smoke (Mohawk) was convicted of assault for the attack on Gualtieri, who had asked Smoke and several others to leave his daughter's house, which he was helping build as a wedding present. Smoke apologized to Gualtieri in court, in one of several criminal cases arising out of the DCE occupation.

== September 2007 Brantford development protest ==
On September 4, 2007, a development site on Grand River Ave within six miles of the Grand River in Brantford was blocked off by native protesters, following an earlier visit where the protesters expressed concerns about the construction taking place on the disputed Haldimand Tract. Later in the day, police arrived on the scene and eventually some work was allowed to continue on the site.

== Solidarity protests ==
=== Tyendinaga gravel quarry occupation solidarity blockade ===
On April 25, 2008, Six Nations protesters blocked off the Highway 6 bypass and the CN Rail line to show support for four Mohawks arrested during a protest at Tyendinaga Mohawk Territory the day before; this protest was centred around a quarry on the disputed Culbertson Tract that had started in March 2007. Shawn Brant, one of the Tyendinaga protesters arrested, was charged with assault with a weapon, breach of bail conditions, possession of weapons and possession of marijuana.

At around 4:30 pm, protesters in Caledonia dug a trench across the Highway 6 bypass and dragged a large part of a hydro tower over the road. The OPP erected two blockades on either side of the bypass to ensure public safety.

=== Wetʼsuwetʼen solidarity blockade ===
In response to the OPP moving in to arrest protesters at the level crossing located near Tyendinaga Mohawk Territory on the morning of February 24, 2020, and in solidarity with the Wetʼsuwetʼen opposing the construction of the Coastal GasLink Pipeline, members of the Mohawk Nation (Bear Clan) from Six Nations began a peaceful demonstration on the Ontario Highway 6 bypass near Caledonia, blocking traffic and commuter trains along the Lakeshore West GO line later in the day on February 24. Eventually, a blockade consisting of pallets and parked vehicles was set up on the highway, forcing traffic to be rerouted to a nearby bridge, and leading the OPP to place concrete barriers around the blockade for safety. The blockade remained up until March 19, when the protesters agreed to leave the road and withdraw to Douglas Creek Estates "as a sign of good faith".

== 1492 Land Back Lane (McKenzie Meadows) ==
1492 Land Back Lane
- Part of indigenous specific land claims in Canada
- Date: July 19, 2020–present
- Location: Canada
- Caused by: Development of McKenzie Meadows subdivision near Caledonia, Ontario and Six Nations of the Grand River
- Status: McKenzie Meadows development cancelled (July 2, 2021); Injunctions cancelled (December 21, 2021); Indigenous land defence ongoing

Parties
Land defenders: Six Nations community members and allies; Haudenosaunee Confederacy Chiefs Council	Government and police: Haldimand County; Ontario Provincial Police; Government of Ontario

Lead figures
Skyler Williams (spokesperson)	Ken Hewitt; Rodney LeClair; Doug Ford

Casualties
- Arrested: 37
- Charged: 52

=== Background ===
McKenzie Meadows was a planned residential development project located south of Caledonia, on the west side of McKenzie Road and the south side of Fuller Drive. The project was owned by Foxgate Development (previously by 2036356 Ontario Inc.), a consortium created by Losani Homes and Ballantry Homes (a Toronto-based residential development company), with Michael Corrado specifically listed as one of the owners. The land planned for the development amounted to 107 acres (0.43 km^{2}). In October and November 2013, the Six Nations Elected Council, through the community engagement website Six Nations Future, engaged in consultation with Six Nations citizens regarding the development. Benefits presented to the community during the consultation process include job prospects for community members and the raising of funds throughout the construction of residential units for the eventual construction of "Kawenn Gaweni Private School", a language school to be built on the reserve. Ultimately, a majority of respondents to the engagement process opposed the project, and the Grand Council voted to not execute an agreement with the developer at a council meeting on December 17, 2013.

On September 9, 2015, Foxgate Development acquired the land for the project from Haldimand County.

In 2016 and 2019, the Elected Council of Six Nations of the Grand River received various "accommodations" for the development, as per an agreement signed with Ballantry Homes. The agreement outlined an accommodation for the construction, consisting of 42.3 acres (0.171 km^{2}) of land across from Little Buffalo along Townline Road (170 Concession 17 Road in Hagersville) being transferred to Six Nations in 2016, as well as a transfer of $352,000 to the SNEC for use in future purchases of land, transferred in 2019. In return for these accommodations, the Elected Council agreed to support the development in a variety of ways, namely:

- "To publicly support the development as it proceeds, including expressions and statements of ongoing support and commitment to the development (as may reasonably be requested from the owner from time to time);
- "To not interfere with or disrupt the development, whether by protest, blockade or any other manner of interference; and
- "To use all reasonable efforts to work with the owner to support a cessation of any action conducted by any member of any First Nations that is intended or is reasonably likely to delay, frustrate or interfere with the development. If the owner must seek legal remedies to deal with such action or conduct, or respond to any legal action which may be brought by any third party, SNEC shall support the owner and shall provide confirmation of such support in such form as may "be reasonably requested or required by the owner, provided that SNEC is reimbursed by the owner for the legal expenses that SNEC incurs in connection with the provision of SNEC's support."

This agreement was signed by SNEC Chief Ava Hill on June 18, 2019, but was not signed by the Haudenosaunee Confederacy Chiefs Council (HCCC), the organization representing the traditional governance structure of the Haudenosaunee, which predates the SNEC (established in 1924) and governs alongside the elected council.

=== Land reclamation/occupation ===
==== 2020 ====
===== July–August =====
Development of the McKenzie Meadows project continued, but on the afternoon of July 19, 2020, Six Nations community member Skyler Williams, along with a group of about 20 others, walked onto the site at 1535 McKenzie Road to stop the development. Once they had managed to put a stop to the construction work, the group established an encampment, referred to as a "reclamation site", on the site of the development. The reclamation site was eventually dubbed 1492 Land Back Lane by the self-identified "land defenders" (the number referring to 1492, the year Christopher Columbus made landfall in the Caribbean, a commonly accepted starting point for European colonization of the Americas).

Lonny Bomberry, Director of Six Nations Land and Resources, has said that there is no traditional land claim associated with the occupied development, since it has been under third-party ownership for at least 150 years, and while the entirety of the Haldimand Tract is subject to a land claim, that claim is not against third-party developers.

On July 31, 2020, the OPP helped a court sheriff read and deliver a court injunction issued the day before against the demonstrators. The occupation continued, and on August 5, 2020, the OPP moved in to enforce the injunction, arresting nine people in the process, including Skyler Williams. While most media reported that the police fired "a single round from a weapon that shoots rubber bullets", several members of the occupation reported that at least three rubber bullets were fired during the violent enforcement of the injunction, which also involved land defenders throwing rocks at OPP. In response to this, Six Nations community members established a blockade on Argyle Street, the Highway 6 bypass, and the rail line. Tires and wood pellets were set on fire, and while police officers were setting up checkpoints, they were swarmed by protesters and prevented. The vice-president of Losani Homes indicated that the enforcement of the injunction would allow construction to continue.

However, the following day, demonstrators returned to the camp, with community members and supporters showing up intermittently to provide support to those occupying the land. When asked about the events at 1492 Land Back Lane, Ontario Premier Doug Ford said during his COVID-19 briefing on August 6,

You know, you just can't go in and just take over people's future homes, it's wrong. And then, when the police come, this is where the people at home are really gonna-- they get an outhouse, toss it over from a bridge onto a police car, then they start throwing rocks at the police car! Like, enough is enough. I'm just losing my patience. I can't direct the police, and I won't direct the police, but people have to obey the rules. I don't care where you come from, you know, what your race, creed, colour, whatever, we have one country, one rule, and that is it! Simple: respect each other. Cause I have a tremendous amount of respect for the Indigenous community, and there's just a few-- couple dozen. Uncalled for. Unacceptable.

On August 7, a second court injunction was obtained by Haldimand County that "prevents anyone from blockading or restricting use of public roads in the municipality". That same day, the people at the occupation site requested meetings with federal officials, with only Indigenous Services Minister Marc Miller agreeing to sit down and talk, according to a person at the occupation site as of August 10.

On August 15, the Haudenosaunee Confederacy Chiefs Council released a statement in support of the land defenders, stating that the McKenzie Meadows development was within the "red zone", in which the Haudenosaunee have called for a complete development moratorium. In the statement, they called on the governments of Canada and Ontario to sit down at the negotiation table and address land issues with them, the hereditary chiefs, citing the issues left unresolved after the breakdown of talks following the dispute at Kanonhstaton.

In a letter dated August 19, Indigenous Services Minister Marc Miller and Minister of Crown–Indigenous Relations Carolyn Bennett offered to resume negotiation of "longstanding and unresolved land issues" with elected chief Mark Hill and the Confederacy chiefs, referring to the negotiations that had been suspended pending litigation first in 1995 and then again in 2009.

The last blockade near the site was removed on August 22.

Someone was arrested in connection to the camp on August 24 in Hamilton, Ontario.

On August 25, the Superior Court extended both the August 7 (despite the final blockade having come down three days prior) and July 30 injunctions, the latter of which "restrains anyone from occupying or hindering development of the construction site" and names Skyler Williams as a defendant. That day, the OPP reported that they would not be enforcing the injunction again until their liaison team "[had] had a chance to deescalate the situation," but that they would have to move in should that fail.

===== September =====
By early September, a support camp referred to by an organizer as a "safety zone" had been established on Kanonhstaton, to provide a meeting place for community members to have shelter, learn about their culture, and support the Land Back Lane camp. Being located off the road and not on the McKenzie Meadows site, the safety zone did not fall under either injunction against the protesters.

Co-host of the podcast One Dish, One Mic Karl Dockstader (a member of Oneida Nation of the Thames, Bear Clan) and Mohawk Ryerson University (now Toronto Metropolitan University) research fellow Courtney Skye (a member of Six Nations of the Grand River, Turtle Clan) were arrested on September 2 and 3, respectively, along with three other arrests on September 2. Dockstader had been covering the occupation as an independent journalist, while Skye was reportedly "sitting on the banks of the Grand River with [her] auntie/sis." Dockstader and Skye were both charged with disobeying a court order and mischief. No further information on the reason for his arrest was given to Dockstader at the time. Dockstader's release barred him from the site and from contacting employees of Foxgate under threat of further charges, conditions for which the OPP faced criticism for limiting media access to the campsite, and going against the decision made in the case of Justin Brake in 2019, where the Court of Appeal of Newfoundland and Labrador set a precedent to distinguish activists and reporters. By the end of the day on September 3, OPP Constable Rodney LeClair estimated that there had been 17 arrests made so far, up from 13 reported earlier that morning. Two more arrests were made over the September 5–6 weekend, with the same charges as Skye and Dockstader.

On Tuesday, September 15, Starla Myers, a member of Six Nations and reporter for Real Peoples Media, was arrested and charged with two counts of mischief and one count of disobeying a court order. The OPP continued to face criticism for arresting another reporter, but Constable LeClair re-iterated that the OPP are "committed to the freedom of the press and respects the important role the media has in the community. We value and strive to have collaborative relationships with our media partners." The following day, Lela George (a member of the Oneida First Nation) became the 23rd person to be charged in relation to the occupation.

In a letter dated September 17, Foxgate's legal counsel urged ministers to not enter into negotiations with the "occupiers" while they continued to defy the court injunction Foxgate held against them.

On September 23, Haldimand County's police services board called on the OPP to step up enforcement of the injunction, claiming their current framework for responding to "Indigenous critical incidents" was not working, and characterizing the occupation as "acts of terrorism" in reference to the Canada Criminal Code.

On September 29, the land defenders' spokesperson Skyler Williams received a phone call from the OPP informing him that there was a warrant for his arrest, for disobeying the existing injunction, continuing to occupy the site, mischief, and breaching conditions from his arrest on August 5.

===== October =====
According to the affidavit filed on October 5 by OPP West Region Regional Commander John Cain, police intelligence believed that a second raid on the occupation site would result in a very violent confrontation that wouldn't resolve the "underlying land dispute." According to the affidavit, the OPP was concerned with the violent enforcement of the injunction, and had been actively trying to seek peaceful resolutions instead. The affidavit was filed in advance of a hearing on the injunctions in the Ontario Superior Court scheduled for October 9.

As of October 9, 29 people had been charged in connection to the occupation and solidarity actions.

In the October 9 injunction hearing at the Ontario Superior Court in Cayuga, Ontario, Justice John Harper again extended the injunctions and ordered those occupying the site to vacate it immediately. In his oral judgment, Harper said,

As a society, we cannot be held hostage to violence and threats of violence. There are very legitimate grievances and claims of Indigenous people in Canada. As a society and as a court, we must take into account the many years of systemic abuse inflicted upon Indigenous people, and we try to do so. However, it is never proper or acceptable to achieve your goals, regardless of how heartfelt they are, in open defiance of the law and open and flagrant disregard for the rights and property of others.

A subsequent injunction hearing was scheduled for October 22, 2020.

According to Todd Williams, the co-ordinator for archaeological and environmental monitoring for the Haudenosaunee Development Institute (a subsidiary of the Confederacy Council), three other sites of planned subdivisions, all then in the archaeological phase, were targeted for actions to coincide with the day of the hearing. Williams said that the actions were meant to highlight the fact that all developers on the Haldimand Tract need to consult with the hereditary chiefs before development can begin. Later on October 9, Williams' car was swarmed by OPP cruisers and Williams arrested after leaving one of the three sites. Williams had previously been arrested in the August 5 raid.

Kahsenniyo (Tahnee Skinner-Wilson), wife of spokesperson Skyler Williams, and Juno winner Tom Wilson were also arrested on October 9.

At the injunction hearing on October 22, Justice Harper found Skyler Williams to be in contempt of the court and dismissed all evidence he had filed. The judge also made both injunctions permanent, and encouraged the Haudenosaunee to submit a formal land claim through the specific claims process, despite its slow pace. In the written ruling delivered a week after the hearing, Williams was also ordered to cover Haldimand County and Foxgate's legal fees, amounting to $50,349.67 and $117,814.18, respectively ($168,163.85 in total). After the hearing was concluded, a clash broke out between police and protesters, which included a flaming barricade being set up on a road near the camp and the shutdown of critical infrastructure (including Highway 6, the rail line, and Argyle Street) by the people from Six Nations. According to the protesters, this clash resulted from the OPP using a taser and firing rubber bullets using a "riot control gun" at people near the "safety zone" by Argyle Street and Sixth Line. The OPP allege that the confrontation was initiated by the land defenders, who had damaged a police cruiser.

In a statement, the Six Nations Elected Council called Justice Harper's decision to make the injunctions permanent "disturbing," claiming that it was indicative of the ongoing presence of systemic racism in Canada. Additionally, they acknowledged the frustration members of the community had expressed regarding the accommodation agreement council had signed with Foxgate, committing to doing better in the future, but admitting that they remained bound by the agreement. Chief Mark Hill and the council called for unity and calm going forward.

===== November–December =====
Documents obtained by APTN National News in 2021 found that the OPP spent CA$3,800,000 on their policing of the camp in November 2020 alone.

According to a CBC report released November 25, "[t]here are now plans to extend [the occupation] on farm lands directly across [McKenzie] road, the site for a 700-unit housing development called Beattie Estates."

By December 16, the 150th day since the camp was erected, several "Tiny Homes" had been erected in the land reclamation camp in preparation for the winter cold.

Meetings hosted by the camp and people of Six Nations throughout November and December led to a "community report" that was delivered to every home, the Haudenosaunee Confederacy Chiefs Council, and the Six Nations Elected Council.

==== 2021 ====
===== January =====
On January 19, six months after the demonstration at McKenzie Meadows began, the land defenders moved their barricade on Argyle Street (which includes a damaged and graffitied school bus) back to Caledonia Baptist Church, to allow access to the church as well as to allow emergency services quicker access to hospitals in Hamilton. Spokesperson Skyler Williams said that this was done as a show of good faith, in an attempt to "[lead] de-escalation and [find] a peaceful resolution, which cannot occur if Canada continues to leave Nation-to-Nation relationships in the hands of the police." The Ministry of Transportation was allowed to assess the damage done to the Highway 6 bypass. The OPP did not remove their blockade on Argyle Street that prevents access to the street from Caledonia, estimating that it would take weeks to repair the damage and open the bypass to regular traffic.

Documents obtained by APTN National News revealed that, by January 19, 2021, the OPP had spent CA$16,272,709 on policing operations in the first six months since the camp's establishment.

Following the community report created at the end of 2020, an online community survey was announced in January, expanding on the themes raised in community meetings in the previous two months, including "advancing a moratorium on development within our territory," according to a release from the land reclamation camp.

===== February =====
The rest of the barricades that had been set up in late October were once again removed, the roads repaired and reopened to traffic.

===== June =====
Following the toppling of the statue of architect of the Indian Residential School system Egerton Ryerson in downtown Toronto on June 6, the statue's head was given as a gift to the people at Land Back Lane, where it was placed on a pike overlooking the site. The placement of the vandalized and severed head at the land reclamation site was seen as a powerful symbolic gesture by some land defenders. As of June 12, the head had been moved to near the Mohawk Institute, a former residential school in Brantford.

===== July =====
On July 2, 2021, the vice-president of Losani Homes told the CBC that deposits to homeowners were being returned in full, and that the planned development of the McKenzie Meadows project would be officially cancelled. He cited several reasons that the "sales agreements had been frustrated," including the development of more permanent buildings by the land defenders, the passage of a year, "the lack of any conformity with or enforcement of the court's orders, and the failure of either government [provincial or federal] to even respond to our requests for help or intervention." Mayor Ken Hewitt was "disappointed" by the cancellation, saying the development had been planned with the elected council and was going to be able to provide an "attractive price point" (starting at CA$300,000) for many of the families hoping to move into the housing development. Skyler Williams, spokesperson for the land defenders, welcomed the cancellation as a victory in a multi-generational battle for indigenous land.

Documents obtained by APTN National News revealed that, from July 2020 to July 2021, the OPP had spent CA$20,766,736 on their operations enforcing the two injunctions. The police force attempted to obscure this figure over the course of the news company's freedom of information request, but the full tabulation of police spending was finally released in May 2022.

===== December =====
On December 12, 2021, the Ontario Court of Appeal handed down a ruling that cancelled the injunction against Skyler Williams that had previously been made permanent by Superior Court Justice Harper in October 2020, as well as setting aside the judge's decision to strike Williams's pleadings from the record and to give him a $168,163.85 cost award. The Court of Appeal found that Harper hadn't sufficiently explained why Williams' alleged misconduct, didn't lay out potential consequences, and didn't give him a fair chance to retain an attorney or respond to the allegations against him. The ruling said, "The requirements of fairness in the context of this proceeding constituted an independent right of Mr. Williams. It is no answer to the denial of these rights to say a fair opportunity to be heard would have made no difference in the outcome." The three appellate judges writing the ruling granted Williams $20,000 in damages and said a different judge should re-hear the initial matter reviewed by Harper.

=== Solidarity action ===
In early August, it was reported that some Wetʼsuwetʼen had set up a rail blockade on their territory in northern British Columbia in solidarity with the demonstrators at the encampment, mirroring the blockades in solidarity with the Wetʼsuwetʼen earlier in 2020.

On August 21, a local preacher organised a solidarity protest at the Rainbow Circle overpass south of Gravenhurst, Ontario.

As of Monday, September 7, a GoFundMe legal fund in support of people facing criminal charges in connection to the camp had raised nearly $84,000 from over 1,100 donors.

On October 9, in response to a call out across North America from the protesters at 1492 Land Back Lane, a day of action was held. Protests in solidarity with the land defenders (as well as with the Miꞌkmaq fishers in their fight for fishing rights in Nova Scotia) were seen across the country. One solidarity blockade on Gitxsan and Wetʼsuwetʼen territory stopped traffic on British Columbia Highway 16 for several hours, in a demonstration meant to reinforce the continent-wide solidarity that had been seen earlier in the year as the Wetʼsuwetʼen opposed the construction of a pipeline on their territory. Another protest in Muskoka saw the third banner-drop in solidarity with Indigenous protesters this year, with banners reading "Muskoka Supports Six Nations Land Defenders," "No More Land Theft!" and "We Are All Treaty People."

On October 25, 2020, the 236th anniversary of the Haldimand proclamation, a solidarity demonstration took place near Caledonia, stopping for a while to demonstrate in front of the OPP barricade on Highway 6. Representatives of several unions were present at the protest, including CUPE Ontario and the Ontario Federation of Labour.

=== Skyler Williams ===
Skyler Williams (also spelled Skylar in some reporting on the land dispute) is a spokesperson for the land defenders at 1492 Land Back Lane. He was previously involved in the reclamation of Kanonhstaton as well as the Ipperwash Crisis. Williams was named as a spokesperson by a group of women in the organization of the camp to be the visible face of the movement, allowing others to remain anonymous. Williams was named as a defendant in the Ontario Superior Court case against the land defenders, throughout which Justice R. J. Harper consistently referred to him as the "leader" of the movement, despite the fact that the camp's own releases identified him as a spokesperson. During the trial, Williams was found to be in contempt of the court for refusing to accept its jurisdiction over him and Haudenosaunee affairs in general. His evidence was stricken from the record in the October 22 hearing, during which Justice Harper made the two injunctions against 1492 Land Back Lane permanent.

Williams was held without bail for seven months at Hamilton-Wentworth Detention Centre on charges related to the 2006 Kanonhstaton reclamation, including four months in solitary confinement. The charges were ultimately withdrawn.

Williams is married to Kahsenniyo, another land defender, and the couple has four daughters.

On May 19, 2021, surrounded by supporters, Williams turned himself in to the Haldimand County OPP Detachment in Cayuga, satisfying the arrest warrants that had been issued for him the previous year. He was released shortly after entering the building on condition that he would not set foot at 1492 Land Back Lane, and would appear before the Ontario Court of Justice on June 1, to face the two counts of mischief, two counts of disobeying an order of the court, intimidation and failure to comply with an undertaking. He told reporters that he had turned himself in, to get the judicial process going, so that he wouldn't have to keep "[looking] over his shoulder," and could show up more effectively for his family.

== Moratorium on development ==
On April 20, 2021, the Haudenosaunee Confederacy Chiefs Council, represented by Cayuga Snipe clan chief Deyohowe:to Roger Silversmith, announced a moratorium on development within the entire Haldimand Tract. The HCCC sought a ban on development, unless authorised by the Haudenosaunee Development Institute. In the announcement, Deyohowe:to said, "We are not interested in selling land. There's portions of land that we have leased out that can still be negotiated. The developers need to stop digging in our lands and to come forward now and do the process." Deyohowe:to clarified that the elected council was aware of the announcement, but that its members are "limited" in their authority to assert land sovereignty. He asserted that the federal government needed to step up their response to the issue of land rights, expressing a lack of confidence in the judicial system's ability to bring them justice.

The announcement came on the 275th day of the 1492 Land Back Lane camp, and on the 15th anniversary of the April 20, 2006, raid of the Kanonhstaton site by the OPP.

In a press conference on April 26, Chief Mark Hill, chief of the Six Nations Elected Council "reiterated and acknowledged" the Confederacy's call for a moratorium on development in the Haldimand Tract. In the spirit of presenting a united front, Hill stated, "We also need to keep in mind that we have a major land claims case coming before the courts in 2022, and it would not be responsible to allow continued development in an uncertain legal environment." He couldn't say whether or not he supports the Haudenosaunee Development Institute overseeing the process, acknowledging that such finer points still needed to be figured out.

== See also ==
- Iroquois
- Six Nations 40, Ontario
- Indian Register
- Indian Act
- Oka Crisis
- Ipperwash Crisis
- Burnt Church Crisis
- Gustafsen Lake Standoff
- 2020 Canadian pipeline and railway protests
