= Marie Trainer =

Canadian mayor

Marie Elaine Trainer (April 9, 1946–October 31, 2024), was the mayor of Haldimand County, Ontario, Canada from 1991 to 2000 and from 2003 to 2010, after having been defeated on October, 25th 2010 by Ken Hewitt. Hewitt finished with 6,984 votes, Trainer 5,748 and third-place finisher Buck Sloat with 2,929 in unofficial final results. She took office after defeating the incumbent, Lorraine Bergstrand in the 2003 Ontario municipal elections. The residents of Haldimand County re-elected Marie Trainer as mayor in the 2006 Ontario municipal elections. Trainer received national attention after making controversial comments while being interviewed by the Canadian Broadcasting Corporation during the Caledonia land dispute.

== Education and early career ==
Trainer was the daughter of Wilbert and Erie Rowntree.

Trainer was first elected to municipal office in 1985 as the councillor for the Hagersville Ward in the former Town of Haldimand (Best 2003). In 1988, she was elected a councillor for the short-lived Regional Municipality of Haldimand-Norfolk (Best 2003).

=== 1991 Election campaign and ouster of Edith Fuller ===
In November 1991, through "a stunning upset" Trainer defeated incumbent Edith Fuller, in office since 1980, in the Town of Haldimand mayoralty race (Nolan 1991). Trainer had campaigned with two main platform points: her opposition to "a proposed $500-million waste station to be located near Cayuga", and her opposition to a "$3.5-million recreation centre" called LeisurePlex, proposed for Caledonia – as councilor for Hagersville, she had withdrawn her support for the later "when it came time to award the building contract" (Nolan 1991). Fuller "took no stand on Enviromax ... because she didn't believe she had all the information" and "supported the ... recreation centre" although the Haldimand chapter of the Ontario Taxpayers' Coalition was opposed to it.

In the post-election analysis, "fear of rising taxes" was considered one reason for Fuller's ouster; Trainer offered her opinion that "Fuller lost because, 'I think she forgot to listen to the people'" (Nolan 1991).

Fuller "termed the race 'one of the most unpleasant campaigns I've ever been involved in' ... accused some of her opponents of spreading nasty rumors about her" and misleading "voters about the issues" (Nolan 1991). Trainer:

"... denied running a dirty campaign, although she admitted she had heard rumors about the mayor. But, she said, she told her workers to ignore them and not to spread them.

'We didn't run anything like a dirty campaign at all,' said Mrs. Trainer." (Nolan 1991)

=== 2000 Election campaign ===
The Township of Haldimand was a municipal entity that ceased to exist with the creation of the municipality of Haldimand County on 1 January 2001. Municipal elections were held in November 2000 to determine the mayor of the new county; there were two candidates and both were mayors of one of the county's constituent townships, Trainer (of Haldimand) and Lorraine Bergstrand (of Dunnville). Trainer announced her candidacy on March 28, 2000, and initially campaigned on "her record at the helm of 'one of the best-run, financially stable municipalities in Ontario with no debt, more than $6 million in reserves and only one minor tax increase'" (Prokaska 2000). Trainer later adopted the slogan "The People's Mayor."

==== "Godly" candidate controversy ====
On October 31, 2000, Trainer wrote a letter to 55 church ministers within the new county boundaries which "was typed by municipal staff on the letterhead of the existing town of Haldimand, signed by Trainer as mayor of the existing town of Haldimand and mailed using the town's postage meter" (Prokaska 2000). The Hamilton Spectator was contacted anonymously by town staff who "said they were uncomfortable about the fact the letter was produced and sent by staff at election time" although "Gerry van der Wolf, Haldimand's chief administrative officer, said it's not up to individual employees to determine the appropriateness of work generated by the mayor's office" (Prokaska 2000).

In the letter, Trainer asked the church ministers "for prayers for 'governmental leadership with high moral standards'" and urged "ministers to encourage the 'churched people of our community' to get out to vote to ensure a 'Godly influence in our governments'" (Prokaska 2000).

Prokaska (2000) reported that "several of the 55 ministers who received the letter say the implicit message is that a vote for Trainer is a 'Godly' vote" and quoted Rev. Jeff Veenstra of Dunnville's Knox Presbyterian Church:

"Although it's not explicit, it is implied that she (Trainer) is the Godly candidate, the right moral candidate, the candidate with the right values, ... I found the timing of this letter very opportunist."

The Rev. Ian Kirby-Smith of Grace United Church in Dunnvile also saw "the letter as an effort by Trainer to garner votes" (Prokaska 2000).

Trainer claimed the letter "was merely an effort to get people out to vote at a time when restructuring has caused confusion among municipal voters" (Prokaska 2000).

Trainer ultimately lost the election.

=== 2000–2003 ===
Between 2000 and 2003, Trainer "assisted in the family beef operation", sat on the "management boards of Cottonwood Mansion and Ruthven Park", and was a member of the "Haldimand-Norfolk-Brant Ontario Trillium Foundation review board" (Best 2003).

== 2003 Election campaign ==
In 2003, Trainer again campaigned as "The People's Mayor" (Best 2003), noting in interviews that "she always talks to people as equals" (Best 2003). On commencing her run for office, Trainer's primary criticism of the incumbent council was that "council [was] not listening to the taxpayers...It just seems it's a dictatorship" (Best 2003). She also noted that in "her opinion, too much council business is kept from the people. 'There is an awful lot of P and C (private and confidential business),' Trainer said. 'I would have a more open council and not so much P and C and I would let the public speak when they wanted to'" (Best 2003). During December 2004-February 2005, she would be criticised for her role in offering for sale, without first holding a public meeting, the municipal hydro utility, Haldimand County Hydro.

Trainer also commented on concerns she had regarding a "bitter" (Best 2004a) Canadian Union of Public Employees contract negotiation with the Haldimand County council that occurred in 2002. Trainer "recalled contract settlements that were completed amicably in the former Town of Haldimand" although she did not explicate her role in these previous negotiations. "Trainer also relayed concerns about union and non-union raises. Union wages were increased 2.5 per cent but non-union wages went up a little more, she said, referring to information provided to her by union members" (Best 2003). A significant pillar of her platform was her condemnation of a summer 2002 council approved "increase in councillor remuneration" at the time of the CUPE contract negotiation (Best 2003).

Trainer received some criticism of her 1991–2000 tenure as mayor of the former Town of Haldimand, in particular with regard to "penny pinching" on infrastructure maintenance—mainly roads, which were, by 2003, in poor repair (Best 2003). Trainer responded and:

"defended those caps. 'Yes there were zero increases but not less dollars,' she said. 'The additional tax base from new residents and businesses was used to finance additional budget items,' she said. Trainer also emphasized that the former town reviewed its roads and set a priority for maintenance" (Best 2003).

Trainer "collected $13,190.44 in contributions compared to Bergstrand's $18,080" during the campaign and won by a 1111 vote margin, with 7303 votes cast for Trainer. Best (2004) noted that in "Caledonia, Bergstrand tripled Trainer's haul ($300) but Trainer more than doubled Bergstrand's donations ($1,250) in Hagersville" and that "Trainer secured most of her large donations from businesses with four from Dunnville. They are HydroVac Industrial, Silverthorne Refractories, 1276340 Ontario Inc, and Lundy Complex Inc. The former Cayuga IGA owner, Greg Potter, donated $750 as did former Dunnville MP Bud Bradley. Among smaller donations from area businesses and prominent citizens were $200 from former Dunnville Mayor Bob Blake and $200 from War Memorial Hospital CEO Paul Mailloux. CUPE Local 4700 put their money ($500) where there mouth was. After a bitter strike and angry words between Bergstrand and union workers in 2002, union leaders promised to see [Bergstrand] ousted."

=== "Strange" voter turnout patterns and strength of mandate ===
In the November 10, 2003 municipal elections in Haldimand County "the council voter turn out exceeded the mayoral balloting in every ward" (Best 2003b). The strength of Trainer's mandate from the community was unclear and Best (2003b) surveyed "county political observers", who offered the following "possibilities for the voting trend":

- Dunnville Chamber of Commerce president Marg Clark suggested "there was a preconceived notion that there was not much to choose from in the slate of candidates running for mayor. 'I would not be surprised that (those with this opinion) chose not to vote,'... People were soliciting candidates to enter the mayoral race up to the nomination deadline and this is another indication of dissatisfaction with the options" (Best 2003b).
- Catherine Berry Stidsen surmised that voters noted "Trainer's personal approach and ... Bergstrand's business like approach ... and nobody could get a feel for Marlowe ... With all these factors in play, some people opted not to vote for mayor" (Best 2003b). Stidsen further commented that "[because] of the low voter turnout in this election and the past, she [felt] neither Bergstrand nor Trainer had a real mandate from the community" (Best 2003b).
- Dunnville farmer Merv Watkins noted that ward candidates can campaign at every home while it is "impossible" for the mayoral candidate to cover the county; he also observed that "people are generally uninformed. ... 'There are not a whole lot of people reading newspapers'" (Best 2003b).

== 2003–2006 Term in Office ==
Mayor Marie Trainer and the Haldimand ward councilors elected in the 2003 Ontario municipal elections were inaugurated on December 1, 2003 (for three year terms).

=== Role in the attempted sale of Haldimand County Hydro in 2004–2005 ===
The council of the corporation of Haldimand County discovered, "during [May] 2004 budget discussions", that Haldimand County Hydro would likely fail "to provide a forecast dividend of $280,000." Council met with the utility and "despite low profits due to a rate freeze, the utility did provide the original dividend amount" (Best 2004b).

However, according to statements made by Trainer to the Dunnville Chronicle in November 2004, "council felt it was getting a poor return, one per cent, for their $23 million investment" (Best 2004b). Haldimand County Hydro is the county's biggest asset; the utility's sole shareholder is the Haldimand County corporation, acting on behalf of the county taxpayers (Best 2004b). Trainer gave the value (after debts are deducted, the shareholder's interest) as $23 million while the chief administrative officer for the Haldimand County corporation, Bill Pearce, noted "Haldimand Hydro has 20,000 customers and the book value of the utility is $20 million. 'But we're hoping to get more than that thanks to competition,'" (Kewley 2005a). Trainer noted that "if that kind of money was in the bank, council could do more for residents. ... If the utility is sold, staff will recommend using the proceeds to finance hard assets like buildings, roads and equipment" (Best 2004b). Ward 3 (Caledonia) councilor Craig Ashbaugh later offered a third set of numbers and stated that "With $1.5 million interest on the $25 million sale proceeds, the county can install community center water system upgrades, purchase defibrillators, replace the Dunnville arena floor or construct a Cayuga ambulance base and a new Lowbanks fire hall" at which point another councillor, Lorne Boyko noted that "this is the first time he's heard this list and that there has been no direction from council about it" (Best 2005c).

The council's decision-making before October 18, 2004, is not documented. When questioned at a meeting in January 2005, Bill Pearce "confirmed that minutes were not taken for hydro sale committee meetings" (Best 2005c). At an open council session in November 2004, former mayor "Lorraine Bergstrand criticized council for holding closed meetings for two months on the issue" (Best 2004c). Bergstrand noted that not "only did this deny citizens, who own the utility, the right to know what was being considered, but it excluded them from a public input process prior to a council decision to sell" (Best 2004c).

The first documented decision occurred on October 18, 2004, when "council approved $239,375 to hire the Miller Thomson firm for the job" of consulting on the "request for proposal and sale process for Haldimand Hydro" (Best 2005e). A public announcement of the intended sale was released on October 26 (Best 2004d). Best (2004b) noted in a November 3 article for the Dunnville Chronicle that the "sale will be subject to Ontario Energy Board approval."

"On [November] 17, requests for proposals (RFP) were released" and eleven "prospective buyers" emerged (Best 2004d). By the middle of November 2004, Trainer stated that it had "started to be controversial" and reported receiving over a dozen calls protesting the decision (Best 2004c). Best (2004c) noted that Trainer had "voted in favour of the sale." In December 2004 Bill Pearce offered a controversial reflection on the numerous interested buyers, noting that "the response shows that council's decision to look at divesture was probably the right course to follow. "There's definitely a market out there" (Best 2004f). Council considered the proposals and formulated a shortlist at a closed meeting on December 22, 2004, and announced that at an open meeting (later scheduled for January 17, 2005) they would "release terms of the proposed sale and accept public comments prior to making a final decision" (Best 2004d).

When Haldimand County Hydro was created in 2000, a board containing council members and citizens appointed by council was formed to represent taxpayers' interests to Hydro management. The chair of this board was, from 2001-March 2005, council appointed citizen Bernie Corbett. By December 29, Corbett was asking "if the county had analyzed the local impact of losing a business that had a $1.2 million payroll for 40 people and paid $60,000 in taxes.(Best 2004e).

By January 5, Donna Pitcher (a former Ward 2 candidate) had collected 2000 signatures opposing the sale and stated that the petition "will be examined by the Ontario Energy Board (OEB) ... The petitions will go to the board if Haldimand County applies to sell the local utility, along with many letters protesting the sale" (Best 2005a). Pitcher also criticized Trainer, stating that "[by] supporting the search for a buyer ... Mayor Marie Trainer is not living up to her campaign motto, a People's mayor" (Best 2005a). Pitcher threatened: "'If [Trainer] keeps going as she has done, her career is over. She is done,'... Around election time in 2006, [Pitcher promised to] remind the public, through ads, what council has done with the hydro company, if they [decided] to sell" (Best 2005a).

By January 12, 2005, Best quoted Trainer urging people to register as delegations to the January 17 meeting (registration and comments summaries would be required to take the floor); Trainer stated: "We will stay here until they are all finished, ... We need to know what the public's saying."(Best 2005b).

On January 17, 2005, at "a jammed public meeting ... a dozen residents spoke against the move [to sell]. No one supported it" (Burman 2005). In the intervening two weeks, an additional 900 people had signed the petition opposing the sale:

"Donna Pitcher presented petitions with 2,967 names voicing opposition to the utility sale. She wondered why no economic impact study was done when, by using the county's own economic development impact formula, she calculated an annual $15 million blow to the county's economy if HCH was sold." (Best 2005c)

Bernie Corbett stated at the meeting "the community is dumbfounded. They cannot understand why you continue to pursue a course of action contrary to their wishes. ... There would be no problem getting enough signatures if the public had the right to recall council members" (Best 2005c). Lorraine Bergstrand also "reminded Trainer about her election promises for open, accessible and responsible government for the people" and "criticized council for its quick decision to look for a buyer" (Best 2005c). At the meeting's close, Trainer addressed her fellow councilors and stated that she "hoped" the councilors "would take citizen comments under advisement and make sure they were addressed in purchase applications" which would be considered at the closed meeting scheduled for January 31, when Trainer and the other councilors would make their final decision (Best 2005c).

Marsha Cox, a Dunnville resident who registered and spoke at the meeting noted to Best (2005c) that, in "her opinion, council members acted like school yard bullies who didn't care and who were acting in a parochial manner ... 'It's about control.'"

On February 1, 2005 "council decided unanimously to stop the divesture process" (Best 2005e).

In a closed session on March 21, 2005, Trainer and four of the six councillors voted not to renew Bernie Corbett's term on the hydro board; the council returned the two other citizen members and appointed a councilor, Buck Sloat, to the now-vacant chair position, thereby changing the citizen representation on the board (Best 2005d). Donna Pitcher commented: "There's something seriously wrong with this council," and suggested Council did not have expertise in electricity without Corbett (Best 2005d).

On April 13, 2005, Bill Pearce reported to County council that "[costs] for the request for proposal and sale process for Haldimand Hydro exceeded estimates ... The final bill came to $243,501.77. Legal fees amounted to $162,096.25, consultant fees were $80,738.69 and meeting expenses came to $666.83" (Best 2005e). Best (2005e) noted that "Council is financing these costs from the contingency reserve, which is used to cover unexpected expenses and is a temporary fund for transition costs."

=== Harassment complaint, censure by council, and lawsuit ===
As later revealed in a report prepared by human resources consultants The Burke Group, during the 2003 election campaign "Trainer declared that she did not want to work with McLachlan and other senior staff" in the event that she took office and became head of the municipal corporation (Best 2005f). On November 13, 2003, four days after winning the election and two weeks before taking office on December 1, "Trainer spoke to a senior county manager about changing administrative assistants" (Best 2005f). The administrative assistant to the mayor was, at that time, Janice McLachlan, hired to the position in 2000 by then-mayor Lorraine Bergstrand. On November 19 Trainer "reported having a real problem working with McLachlan" (Best 2005f). Kewley (2005b) quoted Trainer's summary of her relationship with McLachlan in an August 2005 Hamilton Spectator article:

"Trainer denies that [harassment occurred] and says what is getting lost is that McLachlan was hired by former mayor Lorraine Bergstrand, whom Trainer defeated in the 2003 election. 'She was hired by her and was her assistant for three years ... It doesn't take a rocket scientist to figure out what's going on,' the mayor said after council's four-and-a-half-hour in-camera meeting. Trainer said the two did not get along from the time she assumed the mayor's chair. 'I tried, but she was very upset. I can understand that. I kicked her friend out of her job.' She said she asked for McLachlan to be reassigned but nothing happened."

At a municipal corporation meeting held on November 25, 2003, "Trainer was advised by the county lawyer to inform McLachlan about expectations before her performance was criticized. She was warned that the issue could lead to a harassment charge against her or the county" (Best 2005f). However, The Burke Group report gave evidence that Trainer "made derogatory comments regarding McLachlan's performance and publicly blamed her for errors", "denied her administrative assistant access to e-mail and voice mail," and "failed to proactively provide good communication, clear direction and an understanding of her expectations, thus setting Janice up to fail" (Kewley 2005b).

On May 17, 2005, "Trainer asked again for a new administrative coordinator and suggested dismissing McLachlan without cause" (Best 2005f). Best (2005f), paraphrasing The Burke Group report, noted the effect the mayor's actions had on McLachlan, particularly on May 18 and May 19, 2005:

"McLachlan told a senior manager that she was frustrated and had made some errors. She also said the mayor was rarely in her office and was not following up all phone messages", McLachlan "started crying and shaking at work as a result of the poisonous atmosphere and mental intimidation", McLachlan noted that the mayor's "relentless pursuit to remove her from her job" made the situation "intolerable".

McLachlan commenced a leave of absence. "Most citizens had no inkling of strife in their mayor's office until news broke about McLachlan's unexplained leave of absence" (Best 2005f).

In May 2005, McLachlan expressed the above concerns in an email to a senior manager and management deemed the email "a complaint of harassment" (Best 2005f) and, at that point, commissioned The Burke Group to investigate and report to the municipal council. In August 2005, the offices of The Dunnville Chronicle and Haldimand Review received the report via anonymous fax and Best (2005f) noted in a subsequent article that "Trainer, who did not send the report, later verified that the faxed edition was a copy of The Burke Group report. During the investigation, the firm interviewed 15 people and reviewed newspapers, meeting tapes and county policies and procedures on workplace harassment."

On August 10, 2005, after receipt of the report and a "4½-hour private meeting, Haldimand council confirmed in a 6-0 vote that the mayor had harassed McLachlan" (Kewley 2005b). Council voted that three actions be taken: "a written apology be extended to the employee on behalf of Haldimand County council; the mayor be requested to voluntarily reimburse the county for the costs of an investigation by the consulting firm; the mayor be requested to take training in the areas of sensitivity, understanding of harassment legislation, conflict resolution and effective communication skills" (Hamilton Spectator 2005). However, Trainer's response was that she was "not going to pay for it" (giving as one reason that "she had no input in hiring the firm") and that "all of council should take the training and that she had not decided if she would undertake the training if council would not join her" (Best 2005f). Council's actions, and the ultimate consequences for Trainer, represented a mild reprimand compared to the one recommended by The Burke Group report, which noted:

Trainer had "a general lack of concern for the importance of both corporate and legislative policy." (Best 2005f)

"This behaviour clearly indicates a lack of competence as a manager and a definite lack of the required supervisory skills necessary to properly address the concerns identified." (Best 2005f)

"As head of a corporation, Trainer had added responsibility to ensure that the workplace remain free from harassment." (Best 2005f)

"If the mayor were a senior employee in a non-municipal setting, she would be removed from her position immediately, for cause." ((Best 2005f) and (Kewley 2005b)).

The Burke Group report "suggested council seek legal advice to see if [removal] is an option" (Best 2005f), and also suggested that Trainer be given "the opportunity to step down or retire from her role immediately" (Kewley 2005b). However, Bill Pearce, county chief administrative officer "said a council member can be removed for a conflict of interest or an act in bad faith. To do so, council would require a judge's order to have the position vacated ... if a council member is convicted of a criminal act, council has no legal recourse to force the member to step down, but any council member can decide to leave" (Best 2005f). Given the report and on "legal advice from the municipal lawyer" (Best 2005f) council formulated the three actions listed above and "Trainer said the censure does not make her ponder resigning" (Hamilton Spectator 2005).

"After Trainer was re-elected in the fall of 2006, McLachlan said she felt enough time had passed that she could return to her old job but was told that was not possible. She also said the county then refused to participate in a negotiation for a fair severance package and demanded she accept a lesser role in the planning department on a full-time basis" (Burman 2007). On February 2, 2007, Janice McLachlan was dismissed from her job and on April 23, 2007, Janice and Allan McLachlan "filed a $1.37-million wrongful dismissal suit against the mayor and the county" (Burman 2007). The statement of claim was served May 8, 2007—the suit "seeks wrongful dismissal damages of $500,000 due to 'harassment and intimidation;' $150,000 general and aggravated damages for her alleged constructive dismissal; $150,000 for defamation and 'intentional infliction of mental distress;' another $500,000 in punitive damages; and $75,000 general damages for Allan McLachlan [husband to Janice]" (Burman 2007).

The Burke Group Report, which details the investigation of the harassment claim, was released to the public under a Freedom of Information appeal process on June 1, 2007. A supplementary report prepared by The Burke Group was released on June 1, 2007. See the External links section below to view/download the complete first Burke Report, the Supplementary Report and the Statement of Claim against Mayor Marie Trainer.

On November 6, 2007, Haldimand County "announced it is paying a former employee $175,000 to end a lawsuit in which she claimed she was wrongfully dismissed and harassed out of her job by Mayor Marie Trainer" (Nolan 2007). Nolan (2007), writing for the Hamilton Spectator, noted that the settlement "appears to end the ugly affair in which a consultant found Trainer had harassed McLachlan and created a bad work environment during the 17 months she served as the mayor's administrative coordinator following the 2003 election."

Nolan (2007) reported that Haldimand County issued a statement noting that:

"the settlement was reached on the recommendation of a mediator and on the advice of the county's lawyer and the lawyer from its insurance company. The amount being paid by the county is $80,000 and the insurance firm is paying $95,000. The settlement includes $30,000 in legal fees."

Nolan (2007) also reported that "Trainer said she was glad the affair was behind her as it was not a happy situation. 'It's never a nice thing to happen to anyone. I wouldn't wish it on anyone...'" and that Trainer "noted the lawsuit had sought $500,000 from her personally 'but nothing came from me.'"

=== Association with the group Prayer for Haldimand ===
On August 10, 2005, a special Haldimand County council meeting was convened to consider the June 28 report prepared by The Burke Group subsequent to the May 2005 complaint of harassment filed against Trainer. The "meeting began with Trainer praying for peace for everyone present" (Best 2005f). The meeting entered a closed session and Trainer retired to her office because her presence would constitute a conflict of interest during the council's deliberation on the investigation evidence. "For the first two hours of the closed session, two members of Prayer for Haldimand sat with Trainer in her office" (Best 2005f). Trainer returned to the council chamber once the council voted "that the mayor had harassed McLachlan" (Kewley 2005b), an open session resumed and when "the meeting was finished, Trainer remained in the chamber for an interview and then approached two Prayer for Haldimand members. One embraced her" (Best 2005f).

=== Controversial role in the Caledonia land dispute ===
The Caledonia land dispute began on 28 February 2006 when a "small group of Six Nations protesters from the Grand River Territory reserve [moved] onto the Caledonia construction site" of Henco Industries residential development, known as Douglas Creek Estates (CBC 2006), claiming they had not given up title to the land in 1841, contrary to the assertions of the Canadian federal government (then the British colonial government) who sold the land in the 1840s. The site is on the southwestern outskirts of Caledonia, an unincorporated town in Ward 3 of the regional municipality of Haldimand County, where Trainer was elected mayor in 2003.

The conflict between the Six Nations protestors and Henco Industries continued throughout March 2006; Ontario court orders were obtained by Henco Industries to regain control of the development, but when the OPP attempted to enforce the orders, the conflict escalated and the provincial government appointed negotiators. By April 21, a rally of 500 people opposed to the Six Nations protestors (including Douglas Creek Estates homeowners) had occurred, police had conducted a nighttime raid on the site using "M16 rifles, tear gas, pepper spray and Tasers" (arresting 16 people), the protestors had reinforced their presence with hundreds of additional Six Nations members and barricades, and began stopping traffic on Highway 6, the main thoroughfare in Caledonia. A sympathetic protest at the Tyendinaga Mohawk reserve was occurring, in which CN tracks were blocked on the main rail corridor between Southern Ontario and eastern Canada (CBC 2006). On April 21, Sam George, brother of Dudley George, who was killed during the Ipperwash crisis, "[called] for calm" (CBC 2006).

By April 22, 18 hours of talks occurred between the provincial negotiators and the protestors. However, on April 24, 3000 residents of Caledonia demonstrated near the site, demanding that authorities remove the Six Nations members from the Douglas Creek Estates. The CBC (2006b) reported that one resident demonstrator stated:

"Our politicians are hiding, .. and it makes me sick."

That evening, 500 of these demonstrators confronted the police and the Six Nations protestors, approached the barricades, smashed a police vehicle and caused "100 police officers [to] keep them away" (one person was arrested) (CBC 2006).

==== Disingenuous comments insult protestors and incite demonstrators ====
On April 25, 2006, Trainer, as mayor of Haldimand County and not a member of the provincial government negotiating team, "[infuriated] protesters when she [told] CBC Newsworld that Caledonia residents:

"...have to get to work to support their families. If they don't go to work, they don't get paid and if they don't get paid then they can't pay their mortgages and they lose their homes. ... They don't have money coming in automatically every month. ... They've got to work to survive and the natives have got to realize that." (CBC 2006)

Six nations members understood Trainer was "labelling them as welfare recipients" and at least one unidentified Six Nations member confronted her on national television (CBC 2006b):

"I don't know where you get off. Your redneck attitude is what's causing this whole thing," the woman said. "There's no way you're going to make us come off as welfare recipients. You put it right on the air and I just seen it. You had no damn business saying it."

The CBC (2006b) noted that the "incident marked a further deterioration in relations between the protesters and town residents following a noisy confrontation at the barricades Monday night that led to the arrest of one person."

"After Trainer [made] the comments, Haldimand County Council [voted] to replace her with deputy mayor Tom Patterson as its spokesperson on the issue." (CBC 2006)

On April 28, 500 residents of Caledonia again demonstrated near the barricades and the additional conflict between residents, the police and the Six Nations protestors was firmly established.

==== Prejudicial comments regarding power outage ====
On May 22, 2006, a truck was lit on fire and placed inside a hydro substation near Argyle Street in Caledonia, near the Caledonia land dispute (Nolan 2006). Two transformers were damaged and residents in two counties – Haldimand and Norfolk – and the Six Nations reserve (Brantford Expositor 2006) lost power, some for two days (Nolan 2006). The Haldimand County council declared a state of emergency and "Hydro One officials" estimated "the cost of repairing the damage from the arson" at over "$1.5 million" (Nolan 2006).

On May 23, 2006, Trainer told a reporter for the Hamilton Spectator that "I've had a lot of calls from people worried about how it happened," and that "[people] are very, very upset" (Choi 2006). The Brantford Expositor (2006) reported that "Trainer says natives vandalized a hydro transformer that blacked out power in Caledonia, Simcoe, Waterford and part of the Six Nations reserve. Trainer has no hard evidence Friday to back up her claim that natives set fire to the transformer." The Brantford Expositor (2006) offered the opinion that "Trainer as a veteran politician ought to have the sense not to point fingers without proof. It does no good to stir up animosity, just as progress is being made in settling the Caledonia standoff." As of June 2010, the standoff is in its fiftieth month.

== 2023–2024 ==
Trainer was elected in a by-election on June 20, 2023 to serve as Ward 4 councillor in Haldimand County. She served as councillor until her death on October 31, 2024 from the complications due to a car crash two months earlier.
