= Six Nations of the Grand River Elected Council =

Elected Government of the Six Nations

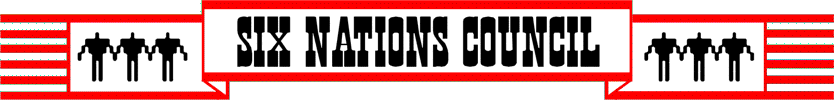
Logo of the Six Nations of the Grand River Elected Council

The Six Nations of the Grand River Elected Council is the governing body of Six Nations of the Grand River established under the Indian Act in 1924. The Elected Council consists of one Grand Chief and nine Councillors elected to four year terms, with the current council elected in November 2019.

Over its history, elections for the Elected Council have had extremely low turnout-- for instance, the 2013 election had a turnout of 5.15%-- due in part to some Six Nations citizens believing the council to have usurped the power of the traditional government of the Haudenosaunee Confederacy, organized today as the Haudenosaunee Confederacy Chiefs Council. Supporters of the Elected Council are called "Dehorners" (Onondaga: dehadína’ga·hä́·gwas), referring to the deer antler headdresses of the traditional chiefs.

== Current Council ==
The current Elected Council was sworn in on November 12, 2019.

Grand Chief: Mark Hill

Councillors: Sherri Lyn Hill-Pierce, Melba I. Thomas, Audrey Powless-Bomberry, Michelle J. Bomberry, Hazel Johnson, Helen Miller, Nathan M. Wright, Kerry Bomberry, Gregory Frazer

== Electoral Districts ==
A map showing the six electoral districts used in Six Nations of the Grand River Elected Council elections between 1927 and 2019.

Beginning with the 4th Elected Council in 1927, until the implementation of the 2019 election code, Six Nations was divided into six electoral districts, with two Councillors (including the Chief) elected per district.

== List of Elected Councils ==
=== Band Councils elected under the Indian Act (1924-1995) ===
The first election under Section 74 of the Indian Act within the Six Nations Band of Indians (as it was known at the time) was held on October 21, 1924, with the first meeting of the elected council taking place the following day at the Council House in Ohsweken, Ontario. A pamphlet meant to provide information on the election announced that the reserve would "be divided into six Electoral Districts, numbered from one to six." These electoral districts remained in place until the 2019 election code reform. At the time of the first election, the Secretary of the Haudenosaunee Confederacy Council, Chief Dave Hill, Sr., reported that only 26 people voted in the election of this council, most or all of them voting twice.^{:287-8}

The Elected Council was known simply as the "Six Nations council" until the official name of the reserve and its governing body was changed to "the Six Nations of the Grand River" under Bill Montour sometime between 1985 and 1991. Throughout the 20th century, the chief of the elected council was most commonly referred to as the "Chief Councillor", though this changed with the 49th Elected Council in 1994.

The term of each council was (more or less) one year until the 28th Elected Council in 1952, from which point the term was (more or less) two years.

Council	Term	Chief Councillor	Councillors	Notes	References
1st Six Nations elected council	First meeting: October 22, 1924	Hilton Hill	David General; Fred Johnson; Archie Lickers; John Lickers; Frank Montour; Joseph Hill; Welby Davis; William Smith; William Jamieson; Frank Miller; Archie Russell	Nicknamed the "Mounties Council" by those who opposed the imposition of an electoral system on the nation by the Government of Canada.	^{:287-8}
2nd Six Nations elected council	First meeting: November 5, 1925	Archie Russell	Hilton Hill; William Smith; Joseph Hill; David General; Fred Johnson; Frank Montour; Frank Miller; Sam Lickers; Fred Sero; Kenneth General; Percy Cayuga		^{:288}
3rd Six Nations elected council	First meeting: November 4, 1926	Archie Russell	Ambrose Hill; Fred Sero; John Anderson; Archie Lickers; George Garlow; William Smith; David General; Frank Miller; Wilbur Monture; James Davis; Robert Martin		
4th Six Nations elected council	First meeting: November 3, 1927	Frank Miller	District 1: Ambrose Hill, William Smith; District 2: Hardy Miller, George Green; District 3: Jesse Moses, Wilbur Montour; District 4: John Hill, Fed Johnson; District 5: Fred Montour, James Davis; District 6: Frank Miller, Archie Lickers	As of 2020, Frank Miller is the longest-serving elected Chief, having served nearly continuously for a period of 18 years, from 1927 to 1945.	
5th Six Nations elected council	First meeting: November 1, 1928	Frank Miller	District 1: Ambrose Hill, William Smith; District 2: Hardy Miller, George Green; District 3: Jesse Moses, Wilbur Montour; District 4: John Hill, Fed Johnson; District 5: Fred Montour, James Davis; District 6: Frank Miller, Archie Lickers		
6th Six Nations elected council	First meeting: November 7, 1929	Frank Miller	District 1: Ambrose Hill, Andrew Staats; District 2: Hardy Miller, George Green; District 3: Samuel Lickers, Jesse Moses; District 4: John Hill, Fred Johnson; District 5: Fred Montour, Ed Garlow; District 6: Frank Miller, Archie Lickers		
7th Six Nations elected council	First meeting: November 6, 1930	Frank Miller	District 1: Ambrose Hill, Andrew Staats; District 2: Hardy Miller, George Green; District 3: Samuel Lickers, Jesse Moses; District 4: Fred Johnson, John W. Hill; District 5: Fred Montour, Frank Montour; District 6: Frank Miller, Archie Lickers		
8th Six Nations elected council	First meeting: November 1, 1931	Frank Miller	District 1: Ambrose Hill, Andrew Staats; District 2: George Green, Clifford Styres; District 3: Samuel Lickers, Wesley Burnham; District 4: Fred L. Johnson, John W. Hill; District 5: Frank Montour, Edwin P Garlow; District 6: Frank Miller, Archie Lickers		
9th Six Nations elected council	First meeting: November 3, 1932	Frank Miller	District 1: Ambrose Hill, William Smith; District 2: Hardy Isaacs; District 3: Samuel Lickers, James Martin; District 4: John W. Hill, Robert Hill; District 5: Frank Montour, E. P. Garlow; District 6: Frank Miller, Wesley Beaver		
10th Six Nations elected council	First meeting: November 2, 1933	William Smith	District 1: William Smith, Titus VanEvery; District 2: Hardy Isaacs, Leonard Staats; District 3: Leonard Staats, James Martin; District 4: Robert Hill, Herman Styres; District 5: Frank Martin, E. P. Garlow; District 6: Frank Miller, William Bomberry		
11th Six Nations elected council	First meeting: November 1, 1934	Frank Miller	District 1: William Smith, Titus VanEvery; District 2: Hardy Isaacs, Robert Carpenter; District 3: James Martin, Winton Loft; District 4: Robert Hill, John Hill; District 5: Frank Montour, Fred J. Hill; District 6: Frank Miller, John Lickers		
12th Six Nations elected council	First meeting: November 7, 1935	William Smith	District 1: William Smith, Ambrose Hill; District 2: Robert Carpenter, Clifford Styres; District 3: James Miller, Samuel Lickers; District 4: Robert Hill, William Johnson; District 5: Fred Hill, Fred Montour; District 6: John R. Lickers, William Crawford		
13th Six Nations elected council	First meeting: November 5, 1936	Frank Miller	District 1: William Smith, Ambrose Hill; District 2: Clifford Styres, Leonard Staats; District 3: James Martin, Samuel Lickers; District 4: Robert Hill, William Johnson; District 5: E. P. Garlow, Fred Montour; District 6: Frank Miller, Pat Longboat		
14th Six Nations elected council	First meeting: November 4, 1937	Frank Miller	District 1: William Smith, Alex Garlow; District 2: Leonard Staats, Hardy Isaacs; District 3: James Martin, G. E. Garlow; District 4: Robert Hill, William Johnson; District 5: E. P. Garlow, Fred J. Hill; District 6: Frank Miller, Archie LIckers		
15th Six Nations elected council	First meeting: November 3, 1938	Frank Miller	District 1: William Smith, Alex Garlow; District 2: Hardy Isaacs, Wilfred Smith; District 3: James Martin, Walter Lickers; District 4: Robert Hill, William Johnson; District 5: E. P. Garlow, Fred Hill; District 6: Frank Miller, Edward Longboat		
16th Six Nations elected council	First meeting: November 2, 1939	Frank Miller	District 1: Alex Garlow; District 2: Leonard Staats, Wilfred Smith; District 3: James Martin, Walter Lickers; District 4: William Johnson, Fred L. Johnson; District 5: E. P. Garlow, Fred J. Hill; District 6: Frank Miller, Edward Longboat		
17th Six Nations elected council	First meeting: November 7, 1940	Frank Miller	District 1: Alex Garlow, James Powless; District 2: Leonard Staats, Wilfred Smith; District 3: James Martin, Walter Lickers; District 4: F. L. Johnson, Herbert Jamieson; District 5: E. P. Garlow, Fred J. Hill; District 6: Frank Miller, Enos Maracle		
18th Six Nations elected council	First meeting: November 6, 1941	Frank Miller	District 1: Alex Garlow; District 2: Wilfred L. Smith, Leonard Staats; District 3: James Martin, Walter Lickers; District 4: Herbert Jamieson, William Johnson; District 5: Fred J. Hill, Wilfred Davey; District 6: Frank Miller, Enos Maracle		
19th Six Nations elected council	First meeting: November 5, 1942	Frank Miller	District 1: Alex Garlow, James Davis; District 2: Wilfred L. Smith, Leonard Staats; District 3: James Martin, Samuel Lickers; District 4: Herbert Jamieson, William Johnson; District 5: Fred J. Hill, George Buck; District 6: Frank Miller, Enos Maracle		
20th Six Nations elected council	First meeting: November 4, 1943	Frank Miller	District 1: James Davis, Peter VanEvery; District 2: Wilfred L. Smith, Leonard Staats; District 3: James Martin, Samuel Lickers; District 4: Herbert Jamieson, William Johnson; District 5: Fred J. Hill, George Buck; District 6: Frank Miller, Enos Maracle		
21st Six Nations elected council	First meeting: November 2, 1944	Frank Miller	District 1: Peter VanEvery, Alex Garlow; District 2: Wilfred Smith, Leonard Staats; District 3: James Martin, Samuel Lickers; District 4: Herb Jamieson, W. C. Johnson; District 5: Fred Hill, George Buck; District 6: Frank Miller, Enos Maracle		
22nd Six Nations elected council	First meeting: November 1, 1945	Fred J. Hill	District 1: James Davis, Alex Garlow; District 2: Hardy Isaacs, Wilfred Smith; District 3: James Martin, Samuel Lickers; District 4: W. C. Johnson, Herbert Jamieson; District 5: Fred J. Hill, James Montour; District 6: Enos Maracle, Frank Doxtator		
23rd Six Nations elected council	First meeting: November 7, 1946	Enos Maracle	District 1: James Davis, Alex Garlow; District 2: Hardy Isaacs, Wilfred Smith; District 3: James Martin, Hulsie Martin; District 4: Herbert Jamieson, William Johnson; District 5: Fred J. Hill, George VanEvery; District 6: Frank Miller, Enos Maracle		
24th Six Nations elected council	First meeting: November 6, 1947	Leonard Staats	District 1: James Davis, Peter VanEvery; District 2: Leonard Staats, Wilfred Smith; District 3: E. P. Garlow, Arnold Moses; District 4: John W. Hill, Earl Isaacs; District 5: James Martin, Elam Froman; District 6: Jacob Bomberry, Frank Doxtator		
25th Six Nations elected council	First meeting: November 1948	Leonard Staats	District 1: James Davis, Peter VanEvery; District 2: Leonard Staats, Hardy Isaacs; District 3: James Martin, Elam Froman; District 4: John W. Hill, Earl Isaacs; District 5: Arnold Moses, George VanEvery; District 6: Mike Sandy, Enos VanEvery		
26th Six Nations elected council	First meeting: November 1949	Arnold Moses	District 1: James Davis, Peter VanEvery; District 2: Wilfred Smith, Hardy Isaacs; District 3: Elam Froman, Walter Lickers; District 4: John W. Hill, William Johnson; District 5: Arnold Moses, E. P. Garlow; District 6: Enos Maracle, William Crawford		
27th Six Nations elected council	First meeting: November 5, 1950	E. P. Garlow	District 1: James Powless, Joseph Hill; District 2: Leonard Staats, Hardy Isaacs; District 3: Walter Lickers, Elam Froman; District 4: William Johnson, Earl Isaacs; District 5: E. P. Garlow, George VanEvery; District 6: Enos Maracle, William Crawford	The Indian Act saw major revisions in 1951, changing how band governments were organized. This resulted in the 27th Elected Council being the last one to be in office for less than two years, as well as being the last Elected Council to have twelve Councillors including the Chief Councillor; subsequent Councils elected under the Indian Act have twelve Councillors in addition to the Chief.	
28th Six Nations elected council	First meeting: January 1952	James Powless	District 1: Joseph F. Hill, Peter VanEvery; District 2: Hardy Isaacs, Leonard Staats; District 3: Walter Lickers, James H. Martin; District 4: Earl Isaacs, Joseph W. Hill; District 5: Fred J. Hill, George D. VanEvery; District 6: Walter Bomberry, William Crawford		
29th Six Nations elected council	First meeting: January 1954	James Powless	District 1: James S. Davis, Joseph F. Hill; District 2: Norman E. Lickers, Leonard Staats; District 3: Walter Lickers, James H. Martin; District 4: J. Earl Isaacs, William Johnson; District 5: Kenneth Montour, George VanEvery; District 6: William Bomberry, Richard Isaacs	E. P. Garlow was elected Chief Councillor in May 1954.	
29th Six Nations elected council	First meeting: January 1954	E. P. Garlow	District 1: James S. Davis, Joseph F. Hill; District 2: Norman E. Lickers, Leonard Staats; District 3: Walter Lickers, James H. Martin; District 4: J. Earl Isaacs, William Johnson; District 5: Kenneth Montour, George VanEvery; District 6: William Bomberry, Richard Isaacs	E. P. Garlow was elected Chief Councillor in May 1954.	
30th Six Nations elected council	First meeting: January 1956	Clifford E. Styres	District 1: Joseph F. Hill, James S. Davis; District 2: Norman E. Lickers, Hardy Isaacs; District 3: Walter Lickers, Hardy Johnson; District 4: John W. Hill, William Johnson; District 5: George VanEvery, George Buck; District 6: William Bomberry, Richard Isaacs		^{:20}
31st Six Nations elected council	First meeting: January 1958	E. P. Garlow	District 1: Joseph F. Hill, James S. Davis; District 2: Hardy Isaacs, Clarence Jamieson; District 3: Walter Lickers, Hardy Johnson; District 4: John Capton, Warren Isaacs; District 5: George D. VanEvery, Fred J. Hill; District 6: William Bomberry, William Crawford		^{:354, 365}
32nd Six Nations elected council	First meeting: January 1960	E. P. Garlow	District 1: Edward Poodry, James S. Davis; District 2: Hardy Isaacs, Leonard Staats Sr.; District 3: William White, George Bomberry; District 4: Warren Isaac, Carson Martin; District 5: George D. VanEvery, Wilson Sandy; District 6: Richard Isaac, William Crawford	Clarence Jamieson replaced Hardy Isaacs in April 1960 when the former resigned due to illness.	
33rd Six Nations elected council	First meeting: January 1962	George D. VanEvery	District 1: James S. Davis, Mrs. Rena Hill; District 2: Leonard Staats, Clarence Jamieson; District 3: Walter Lickers, Mrs. Edward Burnham; District 4: Earl Isaac Sr., Mrs. George Jamieson; District 5: Frank Montour, Fred J. Hill; District 6: Richard Isaac, Jacob Styres	The 33rd Elected Council was the first one to include women among its Councillors.	
34th Six Nations elected council	First meeting: January 1964	George D. VanEvery	District 1: Sara Smith, Rena Hill; District 2: Leonard Staats, Keith Martin; District 3: Nina Burnham, William White; District 4: Clifford Styres, J. Earl Isaac; District 5: Frank W. Montour, Enos Williams; District 6: Richard Isaac, Renson Jamieson		
35th Six Nations elected council	First meeting: January 1966	George D. VanEvery	District 1: Rena Hill, Norman E. Lickers; District 2: Leonard Staats Sr., Clarence Jamieson; District 3: Nina Burnham, George Bomberry; District 4: J. Earl Isaac, John Capton; District 5: Enos Williams, Frank W. Montour; District 6: Renson Jamieson, Richard Isaac	Richard Isaac replaced George D. VanEvery as Chief Councillor on March 2, 1967, resigning from his position as one of the District 6 Councillors. He was replaced in that position by Clifford Lickers on March 11, 1967. On that same day, Leonard Staats Jr. was appointed to some Councillor position, and William Roy Longboat was appointed to replace John Capton.	
35th Six Nations elected council	First meeting: January 1966	Richard Isaac	District 1: Rena Hill, Norman E. Lickers; District 2: Leonard Staats Sr., Clarence Jamieson; District 3: Nina Burnham, George Bomberry; District 4: J. Earl Isaac, John Capton; District 5: Enos Williams, Frank W. Montour; District 6: Renson Jamieson, Richard Isaac	Richard Isaac replaced George D. VanEvery as Chief Councillor on March 2, 1967, resigning from his position as one of the District 6 Councillors. He was replaced in that position by Clifford Lickers on March 11, 1967. On that same day, Leonard Staats Jr. was appointed to some Councillor position, and William Roy Longboat was appointed to replace John Capton.	
36th Six Nations elected council	First meeting: January 1968	Richard Isaac	District 1: Rena Hill, Norman E. Lickers; District 2: Leonard Staats, Clarence Jamieson; District 3: Nina Burnham, George Bomberry; District 4: William Roy Longboat, Victor Porter; District 5: Enos Williams, Frank W. Montour; District 6: Clifford Lickers, Renson Jamieson	George Bomberry died in November 1969.	^{:394, 397, 401, 426}
37th Six Nations elected council	First meeting: December 1969/January 1970	Richard Isaac	District 1: Rena Hill, Norman E. Lickers; District 2: Leonard Staats, Ross Powless; District 3: Nina Burnham, William White; District 4: John Capton; District 5: Mitchell Sandy, Ronald Monture; District 6: Howard Lickers, Clifford Lickers	Gordon Hill is also listed as a Councillor for the 37th Elected Council.	
38th Six Nations elected council	First meeting: December 1971	Richard Isaac	District 1: Rena Hill; District 2: Leonard Staats, Ross Powless; District 3: Nina Burnham, William White; District 4: William Roy Longboat, Victor Porter; District 5: Mitchell Sandy, Frank W. Montour; District 6: Renson Jamieson	Victor Porter resigned in October 1972. Gordon Hill, Sidney Henhawk, and Vincent Sandy are also listed as Councillors for the 38th Elected Council.	
39th Six Nations elected council	First meeting: December 18, 1973	Richard Isaac	District 1: Mrs. Rena Hill, Kenneth G. Moses; District 2: Leonard E. Staats, (Alex R) Ross Powless; District 3: Nina K. Burnham, William H. White; District 4: Morrison Smith, Elmo Powless; District 5: Mitchell Sandy, Ronald C. Monture; District 6: Renson Jamieson, Ervin Harris	Ronald C. Monture was elected to his District 5 position in a by-election on January 5, 1974. Two by-elections took place in District 4 during the 39th Elected Council: on May 4, 1974, Robert J. Montour took the place of Morris Smith (who had died that April); then, in late May 1975, Wilma General was elected to replace Elmo Powless who had been absent from meetings since March 1 that year. Robert J. Montour died in November 1975.	
40th Six Nations elected council	First meeting: January 1976	Richard Isaac	District 1: Roland Martin, Wellington Staats; District 2: Morley Lickers, Ross Powless; District 3: William White, Nina Burnham; District 4: Wilma General; District 5: Mitchell Sandy, William Montour; District 6: Renson Jamieson, Ervin Harris		
41st Six Nations elected council	First meeting: December 1978	Renson Jamieson	District 1: Roland Martin, Sheron VanEvery; District 2: Ross Powless, Leonard Staats; District 3: William White, David Smith; District 4: Ronald Jamieson, Peter Smith; District 5: Mitchell Sandy, Jeffrey Burnham; District 6: Howard Lickers, John Staats	Jeffrey Burnham resigned in March 1979, and was replaced by appointee Raymond Hill.	
42nd Six Nations elected council	January 1980 - December 15, 1981	Wellington Staats	District 1: Sharon VanEvery, Alton VanEvery; District 2: Leonard Staats, Howard Thomas; District 3: William White, David Smith; District 4: Wilma General, Peter Smith; District 5: Robert Johnson, Raymond Hill; District 6: George Johnson, John Staats	Wellington Staats would become the second-longest serving Chief, after Frank Miller.	
43rd Six Nations elected council	January 5, 1982 - December 20, 1983	Wellington Staats	District 1: Lewis Staats Sr., Sharon VanEvery; District 2: Howard Thomas, Leonard Staats; District 3: William White, Shirley Farmer; District 4: Peter Smith; District 5: Raymond Hill; District 6: John Staats, George Johnson	Alton VanEvery and Amos Keye Jr. are also listed as Councillors for the 43rd Elected Council.	
44th Six Nations council	January 3, 1984 - December 17, 1985	Wellington Staats	District 1: Lewis Staats, David Green; District 2: Kerry Bomberry, Leonard Staats; District 3: Shirley Farmer, Nina Burnham; District 4: Peter Smith, Leslie Anderson; District 5: Raymond Hill, John Peters; District 6: Renson Jamieson, John Staats	Leonard Staats died in December 1985. John Staats resigned. Those two were replaced by Ervin Harris (possibly replacing Staats, appointed in July 1984) and Kenneth Hill.	
45th Six Nations elected council	January 7, 1986 - December 15, 1987	William Montour	District 1: Lewis Staats, David Green; District 2: John McNaughton, Glenn Martin; District 3: Nina Burnham, William White; District 4: Graham Smith, Lonny Bomberry; District 5: Steve Williams, John Peters; District 6: Kerry Bomberry, Kenneth Hill	Kenneth Hill resigned in March 1987, replaced by appointee Gregory Sandy in April.	
46th Six Nations elected council	January 5, 1988 - December 18, 1989	William Montour	District 1: Lewis B. Staats, David R. Green; District 2: Glenn Martin, Winona T. Johnson; District 3: Nina K. Burnham, William H. White; District 4: Sandy Porter, Lonny C. Bomberry; District 5: Steven R. Williams, John W. Peters; District 6: Kerry D. Bomberry, Kenneth R. Hill		
47th Six Nations elected council	January 3, 1990 - December 17, 1991	William Montour	District 1: Lewis Staats, David Green; District 2: E. Glenn Martin, Anita Hill; District 3: George Bomberry, Jo Anne Johnson; District 4: Sandy Porter, Michael Anderson; District 5: Raymond Hill, John W. Peters; District 6: Gregory Sandy, Kenneth R. Hill		
48th Six Nations Elected Council	January 7, 1992 - December 7, 1993	Steve Williams	District 1: David Green, Misti D. Anthony; District 2: Morley Lickers, Winona Johnson; District 3: George Bomberry, Roger K. Jonathan; District 4: Sandy Porter, Barb R. Curley; District 5: John W. Peters, George A. Montour; District 6: Ervin Harris, Melba Thomas		
49th Six Nations Elected Council	January 4, 1994 - December 5, 1995	Steve Williams	District 1: David Green, David Johns; District 2: Morley Lickers, Winona Johnson; District 3: Deborah Styres, Roger Jonathan; District 4: Barb Curley, Lillian Montour; District 5: John W. Peters, George Montour; District 6: Ervin Harris, Melba Thomas	This was the first time the head of the council was officially referred to just as "Chief" rather than "Chief Councillor".	

=== Band Councils elected under the Six Nations Election Code, 1995 (1995 - 2019) ===
In August 1995, the 49th Elected Council voted to change the Six Nations electoral system. Elections for Council would no longer be subject to the Indian Act, and would be governed by a custom electoral system. Despite lacking widespread support, the change to the electoral system was approved by the federal government two days before the advance poll for the upcoming election in October 1995. Changes from the Indian Act system implemented under the 1995 election code included:

- Extending the term of office to three years;
- Giving off-reserve band members the right to vote;
- Requiring the Chief to reside in the community;
- Deeming a chief or councillor, if removed from office, would be unable to be eligible to run for office for three years;
- Requiring prospective candidates submit to a police check, and barring any candidate with a criminal conviction in the U.S. or Canada in the 3 years prior to election day from running;
- Providing for an advance poll and an appeals process;
- Requiring candidates to provide a biographical description of themselves when nominated;
- Instituting an impeachment process by which a chief or councillor could be removed from office by those members that participated in their election; and
- Making the elections subject to the Canadian Charter of Rights and Freedoms

These councils were sometimes referred to as "custom" councils.

==== Legal challenge ====
The implementation of a new election code was criticized, as community members felt Council had not engaged in the appropriate consultation required for such an action. In early 1996, author Brian Maracle and his sister Marilyn Maracle (who had been a candidate for chief in the '95 election but withdrew her nomination) disputed the legality of the custom electoral system, asserting that, in addition to inadequate community consultation, "the "custom" of Six Nations in choosing its leadership was through the age-old Hodenosaunee [sic] Confederacy." The two sued the band council and Minister of Indian Affairs in federal court with a goal of having the election nullified. In April 1998, the Maracles proposed an out-of-court settlement that was accepted by the elected council. The settlement required the band council to revert to the previous election system and to state publicly that they "wouldn't try to install another elections code without first getting the community's approval."

The 50th Elected Council sent two resolutions to INAC, asking to be placed back under Indian Act election guidelines, agreeing with the Maracles that there had been no widespread support for the custom election code. However, councillor Dave Hill and chief Wellington Staats told a local newspaper that INAC officials seemed uninterested in acting on the band council resolutions, and the 1998 election was held under the custom electoral system. In response to the council proceeding with the election under the custom system, the Maracles threatened to request an injunction against the election in the month before it was scheduled to take place.

Council	Term	Chief	Councillors	Notes	References
50th Six Nations Elected Council	December 19, 1995 - November 17, 1998	Wellington Staats	District 1: David A. Hill, David "Pee Wee" Green; District 2: Terry Allan General, Morley Sherwood Lickers; District 3: Wendy Johnson-Martin, Leslie Sowden; District 4: Ted Martin, Lillian Montour; District 5: George Montour, John W. Peters; District 6: Bryan Hill, Ervin Harris	A by-election was held in February 1996 as a result of Kevin Isaacs appealing his removal from the 1995 election as polls opened. The councillors elected to District 4 in 1995 were replaced at this by-election by Glenda Porter and Stephen C. Bomberry.	
51st SNGR Elected Council	January 5, 1999 - November 20, 2001	Wellington Staats	District 1: Dave Hill, Donald Whitlow; District 2: Carl Hill, Terry Allan General; District 3: Les Sowden, Nina Burnham; District 4: Glenda Porter, Alton VanEvery; District 5: John Peters, Delbert (Delby) Powless; District 6: Ken Hill, Barbara Harris	In February 2001, Roger Jonathan was elected in a by-election to fill the District 3 seat left vacant by the ousting of Les Sowden in December 2000. At the same time, David General was elected to fill a District 5 seat left vacant by the passing of John Peters.	
52nd SNGR Elected Council	December 4, 2001 - December 6, 2004	Roberta Jamieson	District 1: David Allan Hill, Sydney James Henhawk; District 2: Terry Dale McNaughton, Carl Chancy Hill; District 3: Susan E. Porter, Roger Kevin Jonathan; District 4: Glenda Porter, Ladd Staats; District 5: David Martin General, Linda Irene Staats; District 6: Barbara Harris, Ervin L. Harris	Linda Irene Staats resigned November 2003. George Montour replaced her in an April 17, 2004, by-election.	
53rd SNGR Elected Council	December 7, 2004 - December 3, 2007	David M. General	District 1: David Allan Hill, Lewis Basil Staats; District 2: Gail Ava Hill, Carl Chancy Hill; District 3: Levi Scott White, Roger Kevin Jonathan; District 4: Glenda Porter, R. Helen Miller; District 5: George R. Montour, Christopher N. Martin; District 6: Barbara Harris, Melba Iris Thomas		
54th SNGR Elected Council	December 4, 2007 - December 6, 2010	William K. Montour	District 1: David Allan Hill, Claudine VanEvery Albert; District 2: Gail Ava Hill, Carl Chancy Hill; District 3: Levi Scott White, R. Joanne Johnson; District 4: R. Helen Miller, Wray Maracle; District 5: George Montour, Christopher Martin; District 6: Melba Thomas, Barbara Harris	Wray Maracle was elected to District 4 through a by-election on January 19, 2008.	
55th SNGR Elected Council	December 6, 2010 - December 3, 2013	William K. Montour	District 1: David Hill, Lewis Staats; District 2: Carl Hill, Ava G. Hill; District 3: Ross Johnson, Roger Jonathan; District 4: Wray Maracle, Helen Miller; District 5: Bob R. E. Johnson, George Montour; District 6: Melba Thomas, Mark Hill	B. Darryl Hill replaced George Montour in a March 10, 2012, by-election.	
56th SNGR Elected Council	December 3, 2013 - December 7, 2016	Ava G. Hill	District 1: Dave Hill, Lewis Staats; District 2: Carl Hill, Terry General; District 3: Sherri-Lyn Hill-Pierce, Roger Jonathan; District 4: Helen Miller, Wray Maracle; District 5: B. Darryl Hill, Bob R. E. Johnson; District 6: Mark Hill, Melba Thomas	B. Darryl Hill resigned in July 2015, replaced by Hazel Johnson in a September by-election.	
57th SNGR Elected Council	December 7, 2016 - November 12, 2019	Ava G. Hill	District 1: Audrey Powless-Bomberry, Dave Hill; District 2: Carl Hill, Terry General; District 3: Sherri-Lyn Hill-Pierce, Charles Wayne Martin; District 4: Helen Miller, Wray Maracle; District 5: Bob R. E. Johnson, Hazel Johnson; District 6: Melba Thomas, Mark Hill	Kerry Bomberry replaced one of the District 5 Councillors following a by-election in February 2018.	

=== Band Councillors elected under the Six Nations of the Grand River 2019 Election Code (2019 - present) ===
The election code was modified again in 2019. Changes to the 1995 election code included:

- Amalgamating the six separate electoral districts within SNGR to one large voting district;
- Reducing the number of Councillors from 12 to 9;
- Increasing the term of office from 3 years to 4 years;
- Establishing a two-term limit for Councillors;
- Establishing a minimum education requirement (high school diploma or GED) for Councillor candidates; and
- Establishing an independent Integrity Commission

Council	Term	Chief	Councillors	Notes	References
58th SNGR Elected Council	November 12, 2019 - present	Mark B. Hill	Sherri Lyn Hill-Pierce; Melba I. Thomas; Audrey Powless-Bomberry; Michelle J. Bomberry; Wendelyn Johnson; Hazel Johnson; Helen Miller; Nathan M. Wright; Kerry Bomberry	After Wendelyn Johnson resigned in June 2022, Gregory Frazer was elected in a September 3 by-election.	
