= Otter Lake (Otter River) =

Lake in Kenora District, Ontario, Canada

- Location in Ontario
- Location: Kenora District, Ontario
- Coordinates: 53°46′16″N 89°27′41″W
- Part of: Hudson Bay drainage basin
- Primary outflows: Otter River
- Basin countries: Canada
- Surface elevation: 209 metres (686 ft)

Otter Lake is a lake in northwestern Kenora District in northwestern Ontario, Canada. It is in the Hudson Bay drainage basin and is the source of the Otter River. The Otter River flows via the Fawn River and Severn River to Hudson Bay.

Otter Lake is immediately southeast of Angling Lake, the home of the Wapekeka First Nation and location of Angling Lake/Wapekeka Airport.

== See also ==
- List of lakes in Ontario
