= Trout Lake Monster =

Canadian mythological figure

The Trout Lake Monster is an animal claimed to inhabit Big Trout Lake in northern Ontario. In 2010, photographs of an unidentified carcass prompted Internet speculation of a "mystery creature" and retellings of local First Nations legends of an animal said to presage bad news. According to a University of Toronto professor, the animal carcass was likely an ordinary mink in a state of decomposition.

== History ==
After photos were published of the carcass of an unidentified animal discovered near a lake on the Kitchenuhmaykoosib Inninuwug reserve by two hikers in May 2010, they "spread around the Internet, sparking intense speculation about the creature's origins, ranging from the conceivable to the far-fetched".

The photos appear to show an animal described as "more than 20 centimetres long, with a bare, gargoyle-like face and furry body". According to Kitchenuhmaykoosib tradition, it is an oomajinakoos ("the ugly one") that feeds on beavers, lives in swampy creek areas and is a bad omen. Zoologist Mark Engstrom of the University of Toronto examined the photos and suggested that the carcass was a mammal of the mustelidae family, which includes otters, minks and weasels: “What has happened is that some of the hair has come off in the water...It is silly. This is a dead carcass that has fallen in the water.”
