= Workmen's Compensation Board Building =

Coordinates: 43.641666°N 79.3797°W

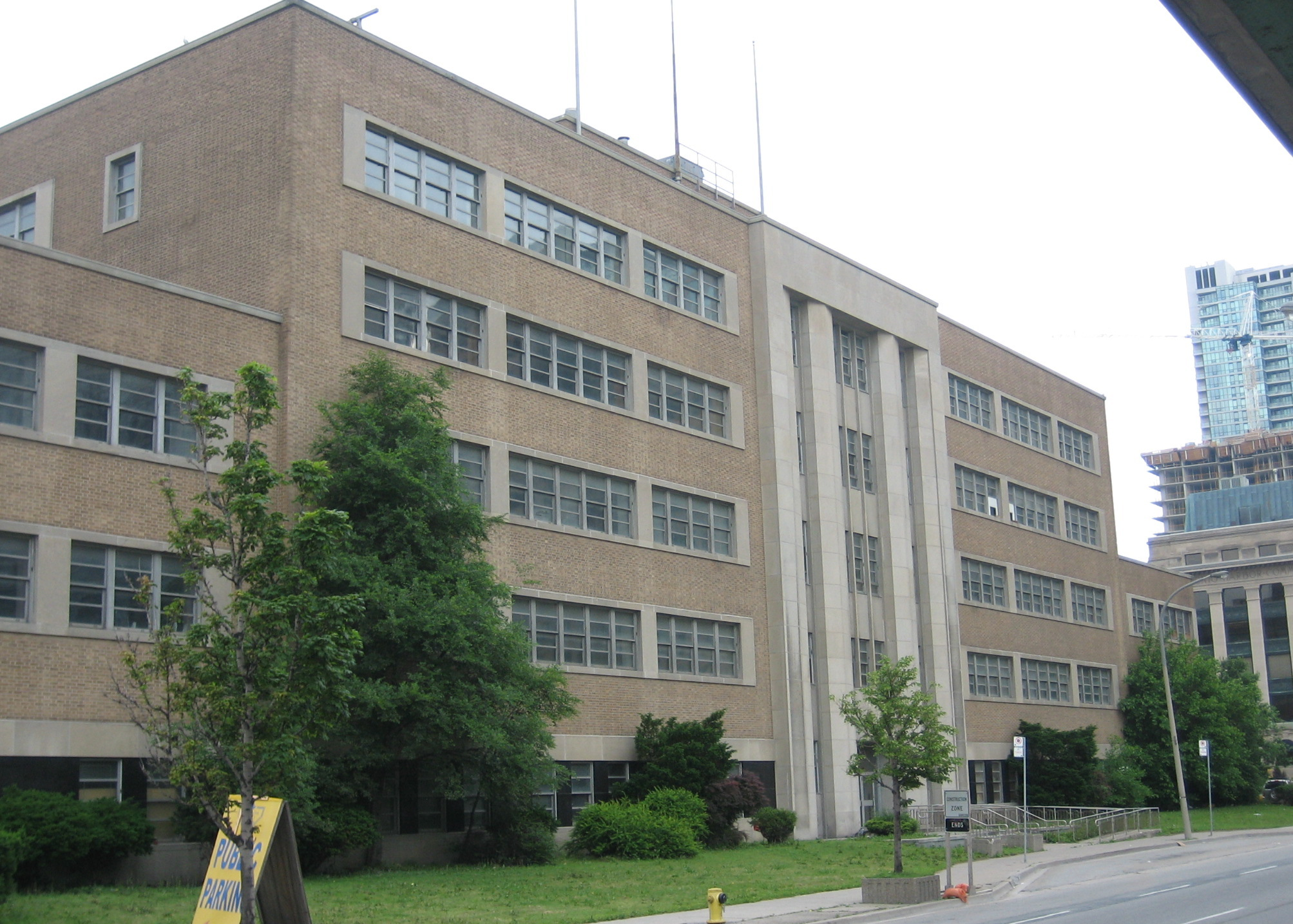
90 Harbour Street, main entrance (shown in 2008 before it was demolished in 2011)

The Workmen's Compensation Board Building (later known as 90 Harbour Street) was a five-storey office building in Toronto, Ontario. It was originally home to the Workers Compensation Board of Ontario from 1953 to 1973. It was designed by the province's master architect, George N. William.

It was also known as the Old Ontario Provincial Police Headquarters, with the province's police force using the building from 1973 until the early 1990s. The Ontario Provincial Police moved into a new building in 1995 at 777 Memorial Avenue in Orillia.

The building was later sold to a film production company, Juxtaproduction, and targeted for use in film shoots. It was used in films such as Harold & Kumar Go to White Castle, Exit Wounds and Ararat.

The building was sold to private developers and then demolished in the summer of 2011. The City of Toronto had endeavoured to preserve the building as a prime example of the mid-20th century style, but ultimately rescinded its application on the grounds that it had no authority to impose a historical designation on provincial government property. It has been redeveloped as a mixed-use development consisting of a 37-storey office building fronting on York Street (1 York) and two seventy-story residential buildings with retail at the base.

Near the site of this building are:

- Toronto Harbour Commission Building
- World Trade Centre, Toronto
- Air Canada Centre
- Queen's Quay Terminal
