= Burning River =

Burning River may refer to:

- Burning River (Ontario), a river in northwestern Ontario, Canada
- the Cuyahoga River, a river in northeast Ohio, United States, famous for being "the river that caught fire"
