= Orillia City Council =

Governing body of Orillia, Canada

Type
- Type: City Council
- Term limits: None

History
- New session started: December 1, 2022

Leadership
- Mayor of Orillia: Donald McIsaac since December 1, 2022

Structure
- Seats: 9
- Length of term: 4 years
- Authority: Municipal Act 2001

Elections
- Last election: October 24, 2022 (9 seats)
- Next election: October 19, 2026 (9 seats)

Meeting place
- Orillia City Hall; Orillia, Ontario

Website
- Mayor and City Council

Orillia City Council is the governing body of the city of Orillia, Ontario.

Council is made up of one mayor and eight councillors (two per ward):

- Mayor Donald McIsaac
- Ward 1 - Whitney Smith and David Campbell
- Ward 2 - Luke Leatherdale and Ralph Cipolla
- Ward 3 - Jeff Czetwerzuk and Jay Fallis
- Ward 4 - Janet-Lynne Dunford and Tim Lauer

== Mayors and Reeves ==
- John Thompson
- T.H. Shepherd
- James Brockett Tudhope - 1900
- Crawford Goffatt
- William Sword Frost
- John Good
- W. M. Seymour — 1949
- J. Austin Cook – 1950
- Wilbur Cramp — 1951
- J. Austin Cook — 1952
- Wilbur Cramp — 1953
- John R. MacIsaac – 1954-1955
- Wilbur Cramp — 1956-1957
- Arthur J. Truman — 1958-1959
- George McLean — 1960-1962
- John C. McDonald – 1963
- Isabel Post – 1963-1968
- Albert McIsaac – 1968
- David G.R. Brown – 1969-1972
- Jack Andre – 1973
- Graham Card – 1973-1974
- Frank Dolcort – 1974-1978
- David MacDonald – 1978-1982
- Patricia MacIsaac – 1982-1985
- Ted Emond – 1985-1988
- John Palmer – 1988-1990
- Clayton Albert 'Clayt' French – 1990-1997
- Ken McCann – 1997-2000
- Ron Stevens – 2000-2010
- Angelo Orsi – 2010-2014
- Steve Clarke – 2014-2022
- Donald McIsaac – 2022-present

== Town and City Halls ==
- Tudhope Building 1997– present
- 35 West St N ? - 1997
- Orillia City Hall 1895-1997 - multi use building; rebuilt after 1915 fire (completed 1917 and now Orillia Opera House)
- Orillia Town Hall and Jail 1874-1890s - 1st permanent home and demolished to make way for 2nd city hall
- Temperance Hall 1867-1874 - temporary home
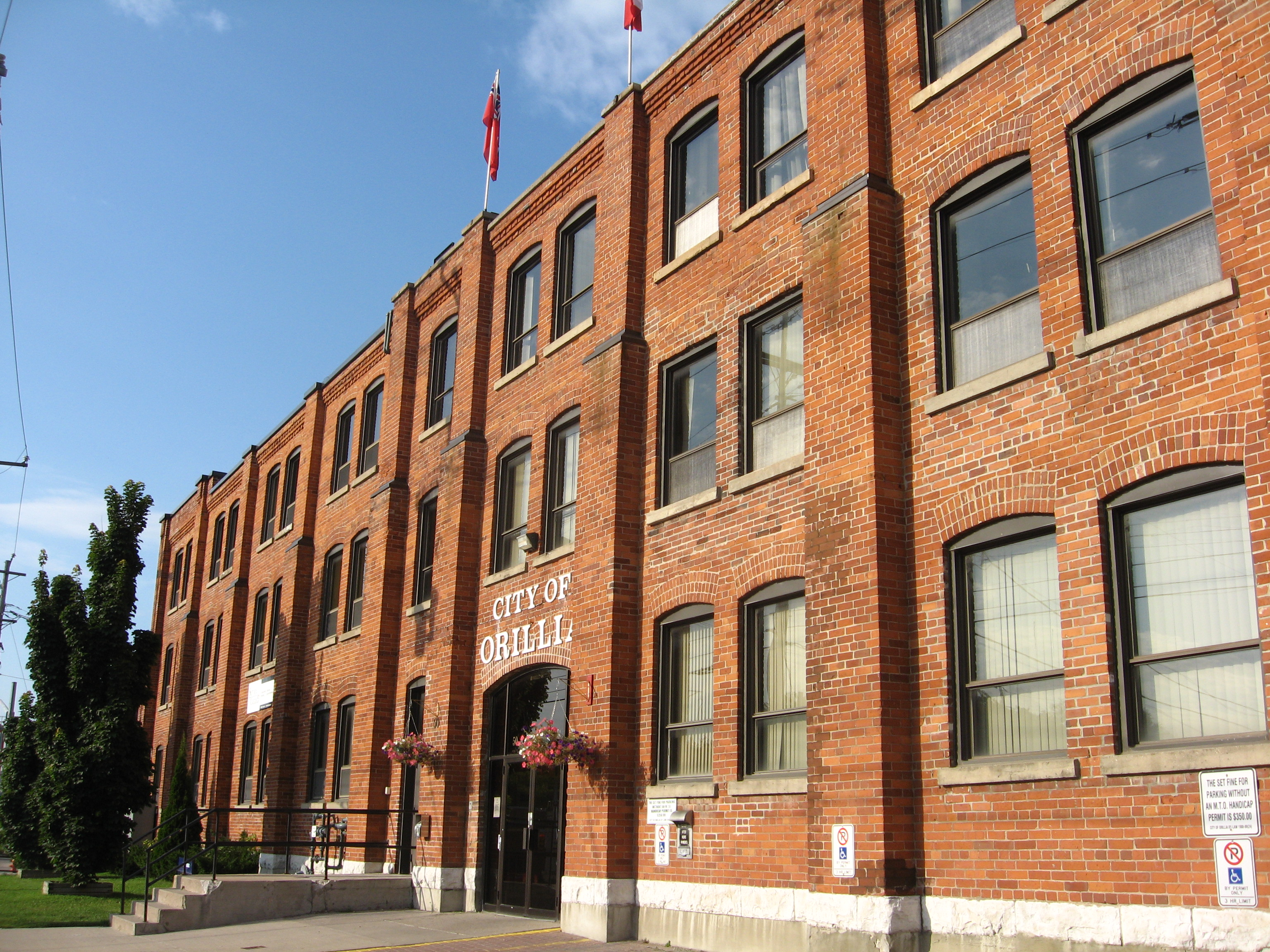
Orillia City Hall, Tudhope Building

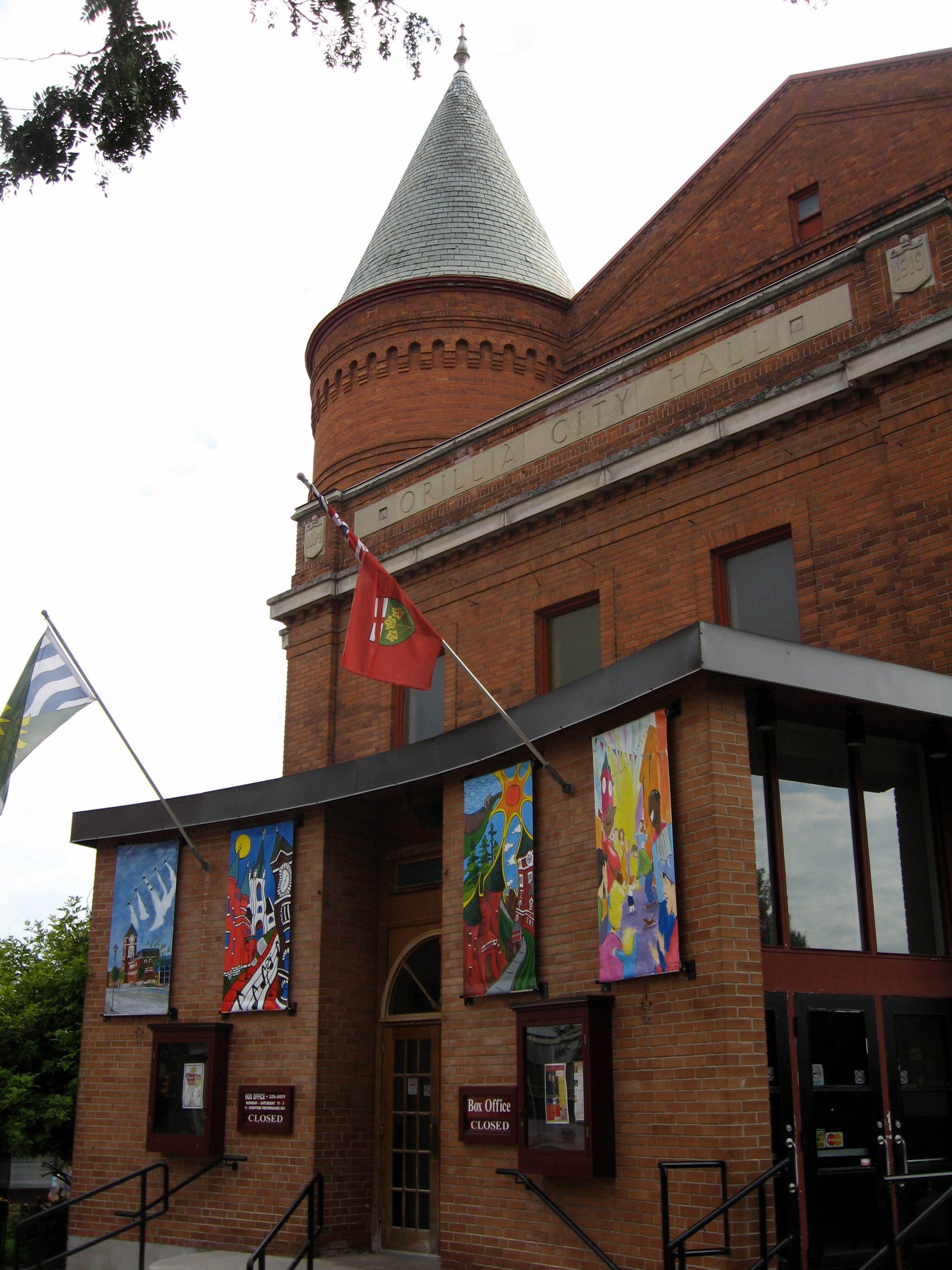
Orillia City Hall/Town Hall
