= Tactics and Rescue Unit =

Unit of the Ontario Provincial Police, Canada

- Active: 1975-Present
- Country: Canada
- Agency: Ontario Provincial Police
- Type: Police tactical unit
- Role: Law enforcement; Counter-terrorism

Website
- https://www.opp.ca/index.php?id=115&entryid=5706c5cd8f94ac5b567b23c6

The Tactics and Rescue Unit (TRU) is the tactical police unit of the Ontario Provincial Police (OPP). It was formed in 1975 in connection with the 1976 Summer Olympics, which had venues in Ontario.

Tactics and Rescue Unit teams respond to high-risk calls in which violence or weapons are known or expected, including barricaded persons, K-9 back-up, prisoner escorts (where there is a high risk of escape or violence), high-risk warrant execution, witness protection, V.I.P. security and hostage rescue.

== History ==
The Tactics and Rescue Unit was formed on July 1, 1975 primarily as a counter-terrorist unit for the yachting events of the 1976 Summer Olympics, which took place off Kingston, Ontario. The first team was established on July 1 that year, with 27 OPP officers being selected for five weeks of training.

The unit was originally trained by the 3rd Battalion, the Royal Canadian Regiment (3RCR) at Canadian Forces Base, Petawawa, Ontario, and received subsequent training and guidance from forces including the British SAS and the FBI Hostage Rescue Unit. After the Olympics, the unit was divided into five five-person teams dispersed around the province; these were consolidated into three teams in the 1980s, after the Royal Canadian Mounted Police formed two emergency response teams within the province.

The TRU became full-time in 1989 and became responsible for explosives disposal in Southern Ontario in the early 1990s.

Incidents when the unit has been implemented include the Ipperwash Crisis in 1995, in which a unit member shot an unarmed protester. The OPP has subsequently made changes in its response strategy and approach to First Nations groups with the objective of minimizing the use of force.

== Requirements and training ==
Officers within the OPP wishing to become a member of the Tactics and Rescue Unit must have a minimum of three years' exemplary service. If chosen from their application, they then attend a two-day screening that includes a battery of written exams, psychological testing, an interview before a board, a timed physical fitness test and a firearms assessment course of fire.

The fitness test consists of the applicant donning a 50 lb (23 kg) vest and travelling an overall distance of 3.2 km (2 miles) over a course corresponding roughly to the perimeter of a basketball court. Six task stations are distributed over the course. Within 32 minutes, the candidate must walk 5 laps at a brisk pace and may run 1 lap for a total of six laps before completing a task station. These six laps, along with the six task stations, must be successfully completed for the candidate to continue. The candidate may be invited to attend a nine-day selection course, considered one of the most difficult non-military selection courses in the world.

After successfully completing all of the above requirements, the officer begins tactical training, which totals 14 weeks broken down into three levels. During this time they will learn camouflage and concealment, land navigation, K-9 back-up training, witness and VIP protection, rappeling, basic sniper, stealth clearing, and hostage rescue. If successful they then may be placed in one of the Tactics and Rescue teams, where their physical and tactical training will continue, along with opportunities for more specialized training in for example sniper, explosive disposal or rappel master.

== Organization ==
The TRU has three teams across Ontario:

- Eastern Region - Kingston Odessa, Ontario
- Western Region - London, Ontario
- Central Region - Orillia, Ontario

== In popular culture ==
The TRU appear in the ROBLOX game "Entry Point".
