= Poplar River (Fawn River tributary) =

- Location of the river mouth in Ontario

Location
- Country: Canada
- Province: Ontario
- Region: Northwestern Ontario
- District: Kenora

Physical characteristics
- Source: Unnamed lake
  - coordinates: 54°36′20″N 88°27′37″W
  - elevation: 150 m (490 ft)
- Mouth: Fawn River
  - coordinates: 55°03′33″N 88°08′27″W
  - elevation: 97 m (318 ft)

Basin features
- River system: Hudson Bay drainage basin

The Poplar River is a river in northern Kenora District in northwestern Ontario, Canada. It is in the Hudson Bay drainage basin and is a left tributary of the Fawn River.

The Poplar River begins at an unnamed lake and flows northeast, then north, and finally northwest to its mouth at the Fawn River. The Fawn River flows via the Severn River to Hudson Bay.

== Sources ==
- Map 18 (PDF) (Map). 1 : 1,600,000. Official road map of Ontario. Ministry of Transportation of Ontario. 2014.
