= Little Otter River (Canada) =

- Location of the river mouth in Ontario

Location
- Country: Canada
- Province: Ontario
- Region: Northwestern Ontario
- District: Kenora

Physical characteristics
- Source
  - coordinates: 54°11′11″N 88°57′36″W
  - elevation: 146 m (479 ft)
- Mouth: Fawn River
  - coordinates: 54°15′33″N 88°58′17″W
  - elevation: 141 m (463 ft)

Basin features
- River system: Hudson Bay drainage basin

The Little Otter River is a river in northwestern Kenora District in northwestern Ontario, Canada. It is in the Hudson Bay drainage basin and is a right tributary of the Fawn River.

The Little Otter River begins at the confluence of several tributary streams and flows northeast and then north to its mouth at the Fawn River. The Fawn River flows via the Severn River to Hudson Bay.

== Sources ==
- Map 18 (PDF) (Map). 1 : 1,600,000. Official road map of Ontario. Ministry of Transportation of Ontario. 2014.
