= Ontario Provincial Police =

Provincial law enforcement agency for Ontario, Canada

Coordinates: 44.583°N 79.430°W

Ontario Provincial Police Police Provinciale de l'Ontario
- Badge of the OPP

- Shoulder flash of the OPP

- Flag of the OPP
- Abbreviation: OPP
- Motto: Safe Communities, A Secure Ontario

Agency overview
- Formed: 13 October 1909; 117 years ago
- Employees: 6,100+ uniformed officers 500+ auxiliary officers 2,800+ civilian employees
- Annual budget: $1,428,600,000(CAD), 2022–2023

Jurisdictional structure
- Operations jurisdiction: Ontario, Canada
- Governing body: Ministry of the Solicitor General
- Constituting instrument: Community Safety and Policing Act, 2019 (SO 2019, c. 1, Sched. 1)
- General nature: Civilian police

Operational structure
- Headquarters: 777 Memorial Avenue; Orillia, Ontario, Canada
- Minister responsible: Michael Kerzner, Solicitor General of Ontario
- Agency executive: Thomas Carrique, Commissioner

Facilities
- Stations: 170

Website
- www.opp.ca

The Ontario Provincial Police (OPP; French: Police Provinciale de l'Ontario) is the provincial police service of Ontario, Canada. The OPP patrols provincial highways and waterways; protects provincial government buildings and officials, with the exception of the legislative precinct; patrols unincorporated areas in northern Ontario; provides training, operational support, and funding to some Indigenous police forces; and investigates complex or multi-jurisdictional crimes across the province. The OPP also has a number of local mandates through contracts with municipal governments and First Nations, where it acts as the local police force and provides front-line services.

With an annual budget of nearly $1.4 billion, the OPP employed more than 6,100 uniformed officers, 500 auxiliary officers, and 2,800 civilian employees in 2023, making it the largest police service in Ontario and the second-largest in Canada (after the Royal Canadian Mounted Police). The OPP's operations are directed by its commissioner (Thomas Carrique) and it is a division of the Ministry of the Solicitor General.

== History ==
At the First Parliament of Upper Canada in Niagara-on-the-Lake on 17 September 1792, a provision was made for the formation of a "police system". Initially, policing jurisdictions were limited to districts, townships, and parishes. In 1845, a mounted police service was created to keep the peace in areas surrounding the construction of public works. It became the Ontario Mounted Police Force after Canadian Confederation.

In 1877, the Constables Act extended jurisdiction and gave designated police members authorization to act throughout the province. The first salaried provincial constable appointed to act as detective for the government of Ontario was John Wilson Murray, hired on a temporary appointment in 1875 and made permanent upon passage of the 1877 act. Murray was joined by two additional detectives in 1897, marking the beginnings of the Criminal Investigation Branch. However, for the most part, policing outside of Ontario's cities was non-existent.

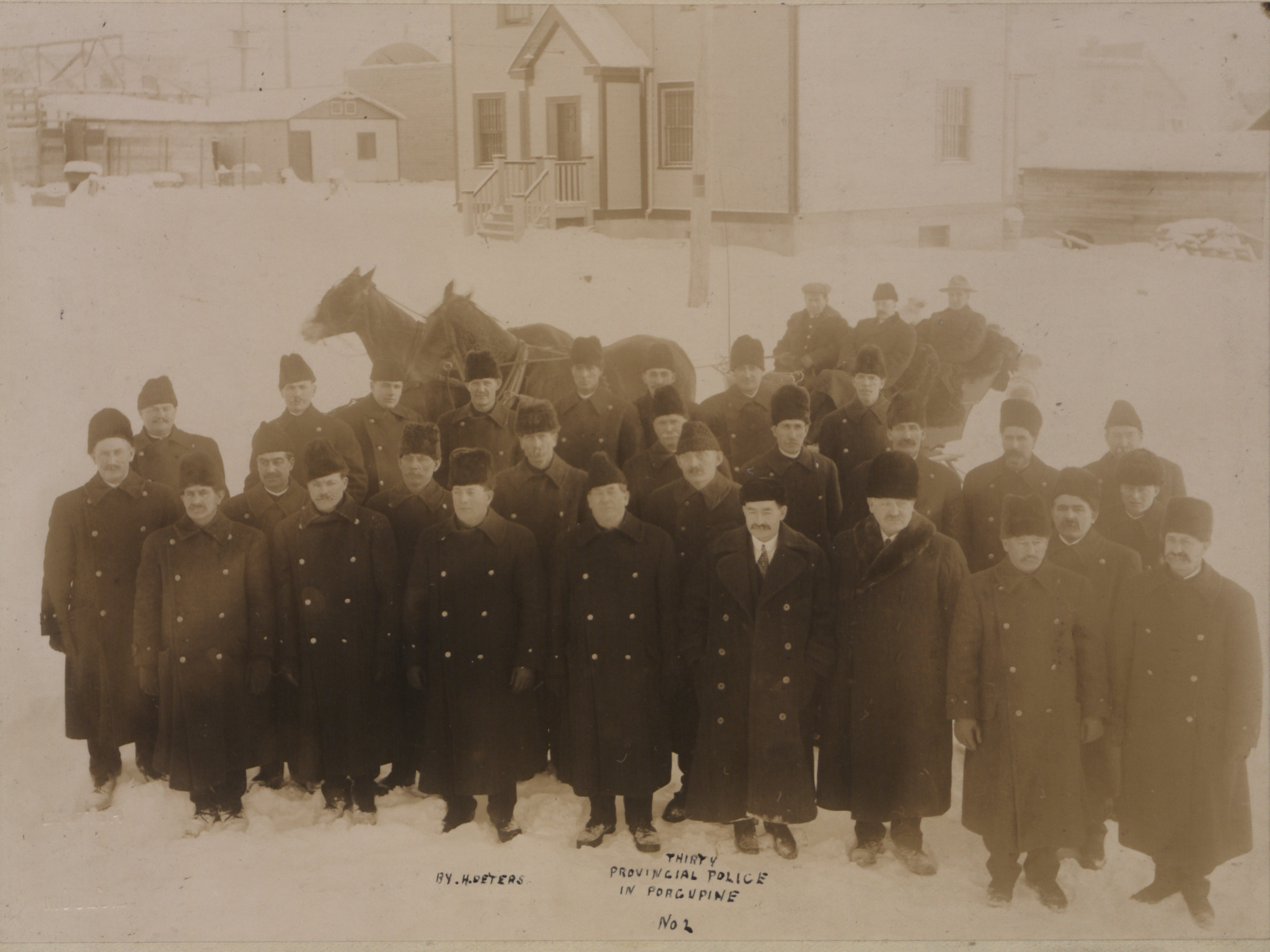
Members of the Ontario Provincial Police in Timmins, 1913

With the discovery of silver in Cobalt and gold in Timmins, lawlessness was increasingly becoming a problem in northern Ontario. Police constables were gradually introduced in various areas, until an Order in Council decreed the establishment of a permanent organization of salaried constables designated as the Ontario Provincial Police Force on 13 October 1909. It consisted of 45 men under the direction of Superintendent Joseph E. Rogers. The starting salary for constables was $400 per annum, increased to $900 in 1912. There were many detachments simultaneously founded including Bala, Muskoka, and Niagara Falls.

In the 1920s, restructuring was undertaken with the passing of the Provincial Police Force Act, 1921. The title of the commanding officer was changed to "commissioner" and given responsibility for enforcing the provisions of the Ontario Temperance Act and other liquor regulations. Major-General Harry Macintyre Cawthra-Elliot was appointed as the first commissioner.

The OPP's first death in the line of duty occurred in 1923, when escaped convict Leo Rogers shot and killed Sergeant John Urquhart near North Bay. Rogers, who was later killed in a shootout with OPP officers, had already mortally wounded North Bay City constable, Fred Lefebvre.

The first OPP motorcycle patrol was introduced in 1928, phased out in 1942, and then reintroduced in 1949. The first marked OPP patrol car was introduced in 1941.

During World War II, the Veterans Guard was formed. This was a body of volunteers (primarily World War I veterans) whose duty was to protect vulnerable hydroelectric plants and the Welland Ship Canal under the supervision of regular police members.

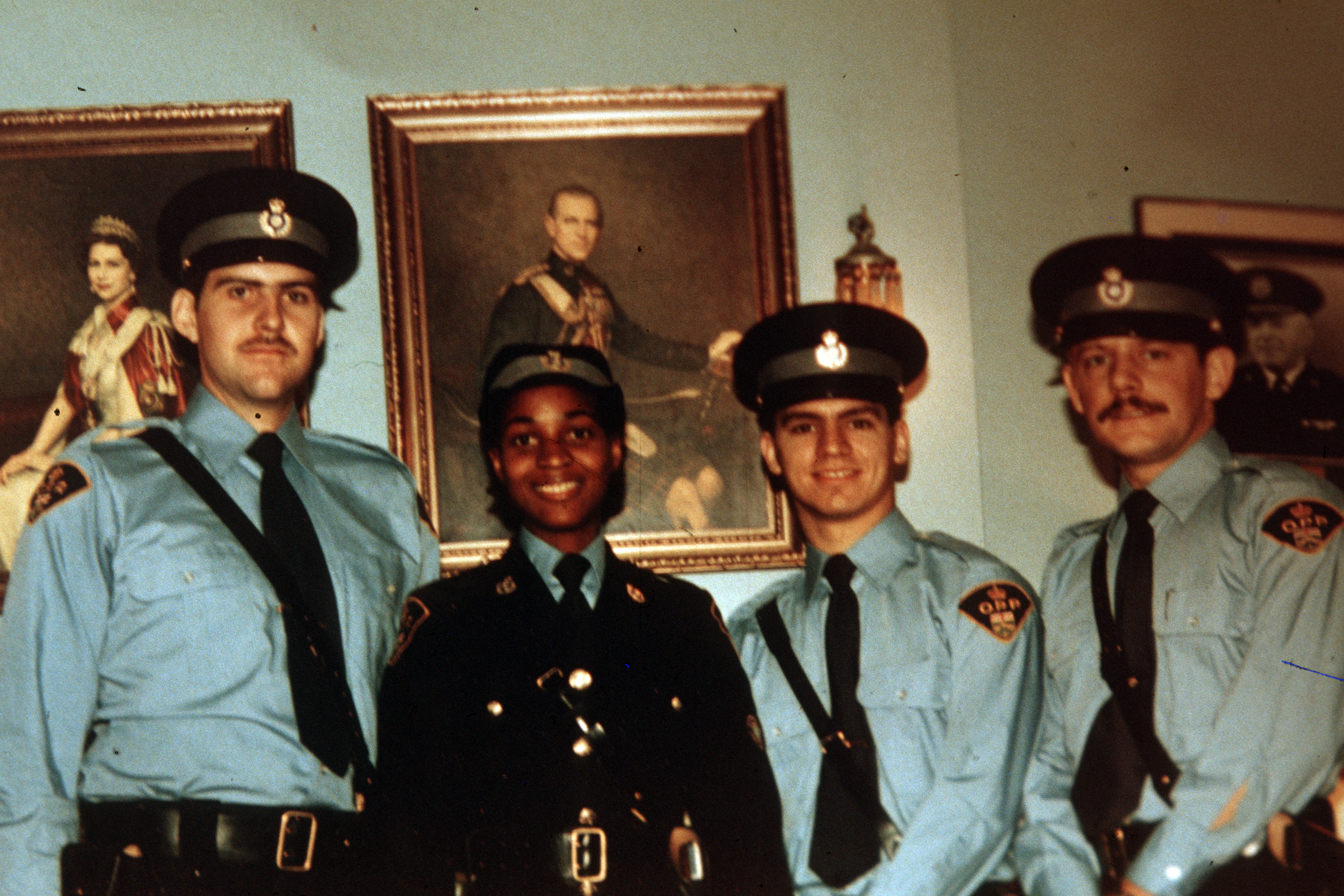
Cadets at the OPP training centre in Toronto, 1978

In the late 1940s, policing functions were reorganized in Ontario, with the OPP given responsibility for all law enforcement in the province outside areas covered by municipal police forces, together with overall authority for law enforcement on the King's Highways, enforcement of the provincial liquor laws, aiding the local police, and maintaining a criminal investigation branch. In March 1969, a meeting took place at the Ontario Securities Commission to incorporate a separate but included group of the Ontario Provincial Police Association. Women joined the uniformed ranks in 1974. Between 1983 and 1993, the OPP officer Al Robinson served as the police hander for the informer Marvin Elkind in what has been described as the most successful undercover operation ever ran by the OPP.

Arms of the OPP, as granted by the Canadian Heraldic Authority in 1998.

Heraldic badge of the OPP, as granted by the Canadian Heraldic Authority in 1998.

In 1994, as part of a tripartite agreement between the government of Canada, the province of Ontario, and the Nishnawbe Aski Nation, the OPP began the process of relinquishing a majority of northern policing duties to the newly created Nishnawbe-Aski Police Service (NAPS). The transition was complete on 1 April 1999, when the OPP's Northwest Patrol was transferred to NAPS. The OPP still administers First Nations policing for Big Trout Lake, Weagamow, Muskrat Dam, and Pikangikum.

== Organization and operations ==
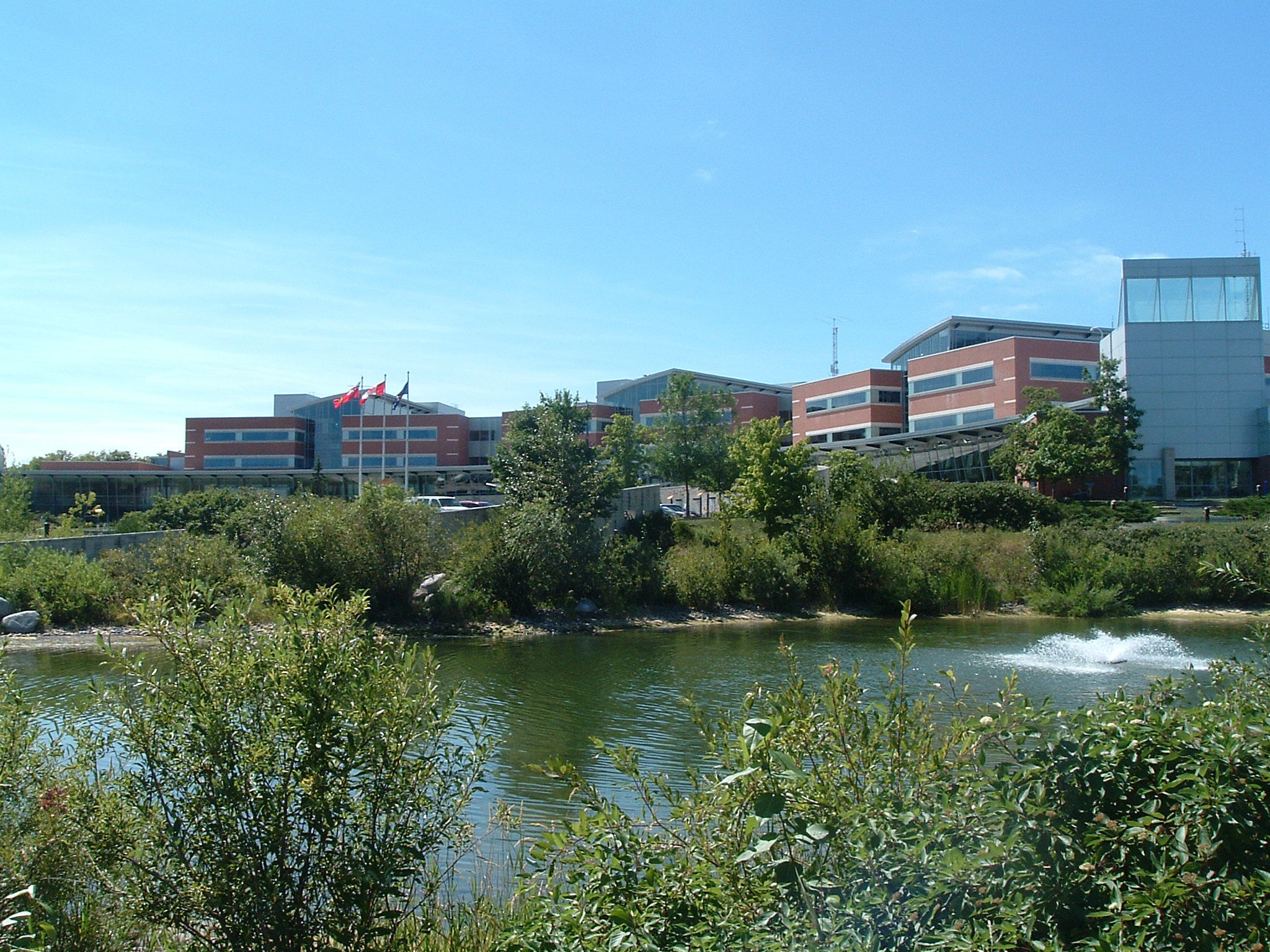
View of OPP General Headquarters in Orillia, 2004

The OPP provides police services to the provincial government - patrolling provincial highways and waterways, investigating multijurisdictional crimes, and protecting high-profile government officials - under provincial mandate, and to municipalities and First Nations under contract.

The force operates out of its General Headquarters, located in the Lincoln M. Alexander Building in Orillia, Ontario. The relocation of general headquarters to Orillia was part of a government move to decentralize ministries and operations to other parts of Ontario. Previously, from 1973 to 1995, the headquarters were located in Toronto at 90 Harbour Street, the site of the former Workmen's Compensation Board building.

The force is organized into five commands.Each Command answers to a deputy commissioner. The commands are further divided into bureaus. The Culture and Strategy Services Command is responsible for corporate communications, strategic development, and the force's internal misconduct investigations unit; the Traffic Safety and Operational Support Command is responsible for highway policing, Indigenous policing, support services like the Tactics and Rescue Unit, and security at provincial government buildings excepting the Ontario Legislative Building; the Field Operations Command is responsible for frontline policing in communities that do not maintain independent police forces; the Investigations and Organized Crime Command is responsible for investigating complex, major, or multi-jurisdictional crimes or organized criminal networks across the province and administering firearms licenses; and the Corporate Services Command administers various business, contract, and career management bureaus.

=== Local and provincial programs and services ===
- Abuse issues
- Administration of the Ontario First Nations Policing Agreements
- Auxiliary policing/chaplaincy
- Aviation/flight operations
- Bloodstain pattern analysis
- Cadet Program
- Canine operations
- Chemical, biological, radiological, nuclear and explosives response
- Chief firearms office
- Chief security office
- Child exploitation investigation
- Civil litigation file coordination
- Civilian data entry
- Clandestine laboratory investigative response
- Collision reporting centres
- Commercial motor vehicles and dangerous goods
- Community liaison; hate/bias incident response
- Community policing/crime prevention and community safety
- Community street crime units
- Complaint investigation
- Computer-aided dispatch
- Court case management
- Crime analytical support team
- Crime gun analysis
- Crime linkage analysis (Provincial ViCLAS Centre)
- Crime Stoppers
- Criminal investigation services and major case management
- Criminal investigation services support team
- Criminal Traffic Offences and Devices Program
- Crisis call diversion
- Crisis negotiation
- Critical infrastructure protection, planning and support
- Cybercrime investigations
- Digital forensics
- Drug Evaluation and Classification Program
- Emergency management and preparedness
- Emergency operations centre
- Emergency response
- Explosives disposal / render safe investigations
- Family Information Liaison Unit support
- Federal Firearms Program delivery
- Firearm verification and analysis unit
- Forensic artist and reconstruction unit
- Forensic identification CBRNE
- Forensic identification services
- Forensic interviewing and polygraph
- Forensic psychiatry and research
- Forensic video analysis
- Fraud, corruption, economic/financial crime investigation/cyber fraud strategy
- Frontline support unit
- Geographic information services
- Hate crime/extremism investigation
- Historic homicide unit
- Indigenous awareness training
- Indigenous policing
- Information technology
- Intelligence
- Investigative genetic genealogy
- Joint forces penitentiary squad
- Joint technical assistance centre
- Justice Officials Protection and Investigation Section
- Major incident command
- Media relations
- Mental health response
- Missing and Murdered Indigenous Women and Girls Team
- Mobile crisis response teams
- Offender transportation
- Ontario Centre for Missing Persons and Unidentified Remains
- Ontario Sex Offender Registry
- Organized crime enforcement
- Physical security services
- Prescription drug diversion
- Protection services section
- Provincial alcohol and gaming enforcement
- Provincial anti-human trafficking strategy
- Provincial anti-terrorism
- Provincial asset forfeiture unit
- Provincial biker enforcement
- Provincial communications operations
- Provincial contraband tobacco enforcement
- Provincial cybercrime strategy
- Provincial DNA Program
- Provincial guns and gangs strategy
- Provincial illegal cannabis enforcement
- Provincial inquest unit
- Provincial liaison team
- Provincial Marine Program and off-road vehicles
- Provincial Motorcycle Program; motorized snow vehicles and Aircraft Enforcement Program
- Provincial offences and devices speed management
- Provincial operations centre
- Provincial Police Academy
- Provincial repeat offender parole enforcement
- Provincial Strategy to Protect Children from Sexual Abuse and Exploitation on the Internet
- Provincial traffic operations
- Provincial Tow Program
- Provincial weapons enforcement
- Psychological services
- Public order
- Recorded patrol
- Record management system
- Risk offender enforcement unit
- Remotely piloted aircraft systems
- Residential School Death Investigation Team
- R.I.D.E. (reduce impaired driving everywhere)
- Search and rescue
- Security assessment unit
- Security enquiries unit
- Service desk
- Special constables appointments
- Surveillance — electronic and physical
- Tactical emergency medical services
- Tactics and rescue
- Technological crime/digital evidence forensics and analysis
- Traffic collision reconstruction
- Technology disclosure
- Threat and behavioural analysis
- Undercover operations
- Underwater search and recovery
- Uniform recruitment
- Urban search and rescue
- Victim assistance, support and response
- Witness protection

=== Detachments ===
Previously, the OPP was divided into seventeen different regions. In 1995, OPP operations were amalgamated into six regions, with five providing general policing services, and one providing traffic policing services on provincial highways in the Greater Toronto Area (local police services in the GTA are provided by municipal and regional police forces) following recommendations by the Ipperwash Inquiry. OPP police stations are known as "detachments".

No.	Region	Headquarters	Duties	Detachments
1	Central	Orillia	General policing	Bracebridge, Caledon, City of Kawartha Lakes, Collingwood, Dufferin County, Haliburton Highlands, Huntsville, Huronia West, Northumberland County, Northumberland County (Campbellford), Northumberland County (Brighton), Nottawasaga, Orillia, Orillia (Barrie), Peterborough County, Southern Georgian Bay, Southern Georgian Bay (Midland)
2	Northwest	Thunder Bay	General policing	Dryden, Dryden (Ignace), Greenstone, Kenora, Kenora (Sioux Narrows), Marathon, Marathon (Manitouwadge), Nipigon, Nipigon (Schreiber), Rainy River District, Rainy River District (Atikokan), Rainy River District (Emo), Rainy River District (Rainy River), Red Lake, Red Lake (Ear Falls), Sioux Lookout, Sioux Lookout (Pickle Lake), Thunder Bay, Thunder Bay (Shabaqua), Thunder Bay (Armstrong)
3	East	Smiths Falls	General policing	Bancroft, Central Hastings, Frontenac, Frontenac (Sharbot Lake), Grenville County, Lanark County, Lanark County (Carleton Place), Leeds County, Leeds County (Thousand Islands), Leeds County (Rideau Lake), Lennox and Addington County, Lennox and Addington County (East), Lennox and Addington County (North), Prince Edward County, Quinte West, Renfrew, Renfrew (Arnprior), Russell County, Russell County (Rockland), Stormont Dundas and Glengarry, Stormont Dundas and Glengarry (Alexandria), Stormont Dundas and Glengarry (Lancaster), Stormont Dundas and Glengarry (Morrisburg), Stormont Dundas and Glengarry (Winchester), Upper Ottawa Valley, Upper Ottawa Valley (Pembroke), Hawkesbury, Killaloe, Killaloe (Whitney)
4	Northeast	North Bay	General policing	Almaguin Highlands, East Algoma, East Algoma (Elliot Lake), East Algoma (Thessalon), James Bay, James Bay (Hearst), James Bay (Cochrane), James Bay (Moosonee) Kirkland Lake, Manitoulin, Manitoulin (Gore Bay), Manitoulin (Little Current), Manitoulin (Espanola), North Bay, North Bay (Mattawa), North Bay (Powassan), Sault Ste. Marie, South Porcupine, South Porcupine (Iroquois Falls), South Porcupine (Gogama), South Porcupine (Matheson), South Porcupine (Foleyet), Sudbury, Sudbury (Noelville), Sudbury (Warren), Sudbury (Nipissing West), Superior East, Superior East (Chapleau), Superior East (Hornepayne), Superior East (White River), Temiskaming, Temiskaming (Englehart), Temiskaming (Temagami), West Parry Sound, West Parry Sound
5	Highway Safety Division	Aurora	Traffic policing	Aurora, Burlington, Niagara, Toronto, Whitby, Mississauga, Cambridge and Highway 407.
6	West	London	General policing	Brant County, Chatham-Kent, Elgin County, Essex County, Essex County (Harrow), Essex County (Kingsville), Essex County (Lakeshore), Essex County (Leamington),Essex County (Pelee Island - Summer), Essex County (Tecumseh), Grey County, Grey County (Markdale), Grey County (Meaford), Grey County (Wiarton), Haldimand County, Huron County, Huron County (Exeter), Huron County (Wingham), Huron County (Goderich), Lambton County, Lambton County (Corunna), Lambton County (Grand Bend), Lambton County (Petrolia) Lambton County (Point Edward), Middlesex County, Middlesex County (Strathroy), Middlesex County (Glencoe), Middlesex County (London), Middlesex County (Lucan) Norfolk County, Oxford County, Oxford County (Ingersoll) Perth County, Perth County (Listowel), Perth County (Mitchell), South Bruce, South Bruce (Walkerton), Wellington County, Wellington County (Rockwood), Wellington County (Teviotdale)

=== Rank structure ===
Police constables in the OPP are uniquely known as "provincial constables".

Detective ranks fall laterally with the uniform ranks and are not a promotion above. The rank of sergeant major is reserved for members of the Professional Standards Bureau, where the rank has a unique investigative function within the force's chain-of-command.

==== Sworn rank insignia ====
Ranks	Commissioner	Deputy commissioner	Chief superintendent	Superintendent	Inspector	Sergeant major	Staff sergeant / Detective staff sergeant	Sergeant / Detective sergeant	Provincial constable / Detective constable 1st to 4th class
Insignia (slip-on)									
Insignia (shoulder board)									

==== Civilian rank insignia ====
Title	Special constable	Auxiliary constable	Cadet
Insignia			
Notes	Digital forensics, forensic investigators, court officers, offender transport, building security	Auxiliary policing program	Cadet Program

=== Commissioner's Own Pipes and Drums ===
Commissioner's heraldic badge, as granted by the Canadian Heraldic Authority in 1998.

The Commissioner's Own Pipes and Drums serves as the OPP's officially recognised pipe band. Formed as the Ontario Provincial Pipes and Drums in 1968 by two constables, the band saw active service to wide acclaim in the 1970s and 80s before being disbanded in 1991 due to department financial constraints. The band was shortly re-formed three years after, and is now composed of volunteer officers, auxiliary officers, and civilian volunteers.

=== Uniformed officers ===
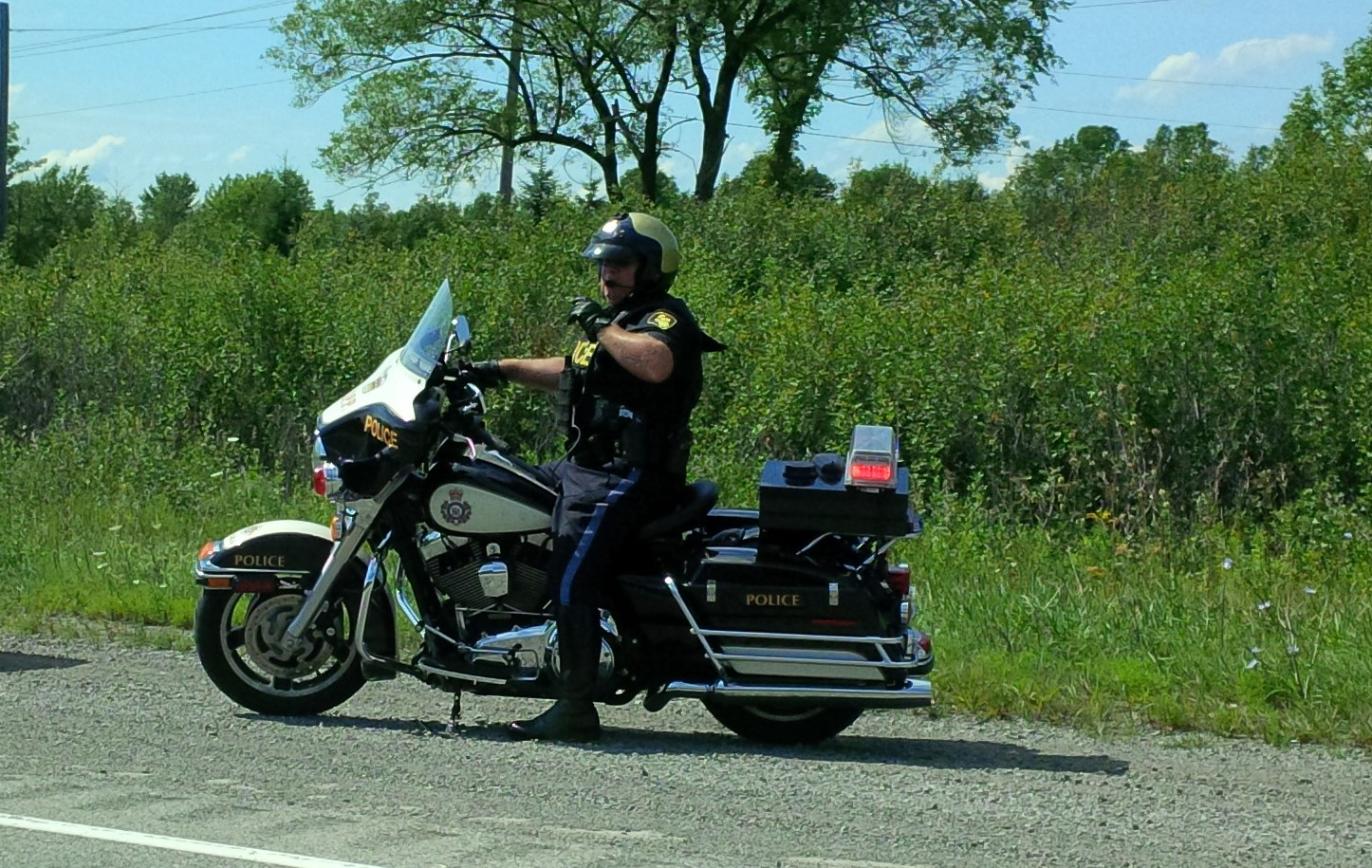
A uniformed OPP officer on motorcycle, 2015

The majority of policing services are provided by uniformed front-line police constables. In addition to the basic training provided to all police officers in Ontario, the OPP mandates additional training at the Provincial Police Academy before and after attendance at the Ontario Police College, resulting in the longest training period among Ontario police services. After this, probationary police constables are assigned to a detachment within the OPP's six regions with a coach officer for a year of field training. At the end of probation, a decision is made regarding retention. First Nations constables employed by OPP-supported police services undergo the same training as OPP officers, spending time at the Provincial Police Academy as well as at the Ontario Police College before returning to their home communities.

=== Auxiliary program ===
Auxiliary members have no police authority. They must rely on the same arrest provisions as regular citizens. There are some instances when an auxiliary member may have the authority of a police officer. This can occur in an emergency situation, or where the OPP requires additional strength to assist with a special event. Auxiliary officers are unpaid, however are compensated for travel and meals. They are required to attend routine training administered by the OPP, and must contribute a certain number of hours monthly. The auxiliary is made up of people from diverse backgrounds.

Auxiliary members are trained at the Provincial Police Academy and qualified with all use of force options.

The auxiliary uniform is distinct from the uniform of a regular OPP officer. Auxiliary officers wear light blue shirts, checkered hat bands, and have their own cap badges. They wear slip-ons with the word "auxiliary" embroidered on them, and their jackets and dress uniforms have tabs sewn on that indicates that they are auxiliary officers.

==== History ====
Following the disbanding of World War II auxiliary forces, growing Cold War tension and fear of a nuclear attack led to the belief that police services should "recruit and train volunteers to augment their strength in times of emergency". As a result, in 1954, the Provincial Civil Defence Auxiliary was created, but the need to more closely associate the auxiliary with the OPP soon became apparent.

On 14 January 1960, the Provincial Civil Defence Organization was dissolved. A new oversight body known as the Emergency Measures Organization—Ontario (EMO) came into being. Each department of the government became responsible for its own operational planning. The organization of auxiliary police forces became the responsibility of all interested municipal police forces, as well as the OPP.

In April 1960, a new organization more closely affiliated with the OPP came into being. The Ontario Auxiliary Police were organized in 12 of the 17 OPP districts and by the end of the year, 376 volunteers had signed up to be equipped and trained by experienced OPP personnel. Two OPP inspectors were assigned to work with Emergency Measures Ontario as liaison officers for the volunteers. This close connection continues today with the OPP auxiliary playing a critical role in emergency and disaster planning and occurrences. By 1961 there were 466 auxiliary volunteers who accompanied regular provincials on traffic and law enforcement patrols and during the year logged more than twenty-six thousand hours of volunteer duty.

== Equipment ==
=== Uniforms ===
Uniformed officers below the rank of staff sergeant wear navy blue uniforms with gold lettering and shoulder flashes. Sworn managers at the rank of staff sergeant wear white shirts with the same shoulder flash as officers below the rank of staff sergeant. Sworn manager above the rank of staff sergeant wear slightly smaller, black shoulder flashes and white shirts, and wear navy trousers with light blue piping. Officers below the rank of staff sergeant use trousers with light blue trouser piping, and forage caps for all ranks are banded with the same light blue colour. As of 2021, officers may also choose to wear a baseball cap instead of the traditional forage cap. Officers wear duty belts, which, at a minimum, carry an officer's issued use of force equipment, and also wear an external Pacific Safety Products vest with MOLLE webbing to store additional items and large placards that read "police" in gold text on their chest and back.

During the 2022-23 fiscal year, the OPP engaged in a proof-of-concept program in East Region which included the use of body worn cameras (BWC), along with its accompanying mobile applications.

Officers serving with specialty tactical units are also issued cargo pants without piping, utility tops, and subdued placards for their external tactical vests. Officers serving with the Tactics and Rescue Unit are issued olive green uniforms.

Since 1985, wide, light blue stripes down the side of issued trousers have been standard. Prior to this, officers wore pants with thin, red trouser piping. From 1997 to 2008, the official headdress of the OPP was the stetson, though commissioned ranks were still issued the forage cap. Starting in 2008, the OPP returned to the peaked cap for all officers.

=== Fleet ===
- 5,269 road vehicles (patrol, investigative, multi-use, motorcycle, trailers and specialty)
- 1,054 seasonal vehicles (Marine vessels, motorized snow (MSV) and off-road vehicles (ORV))

==== Ground ====
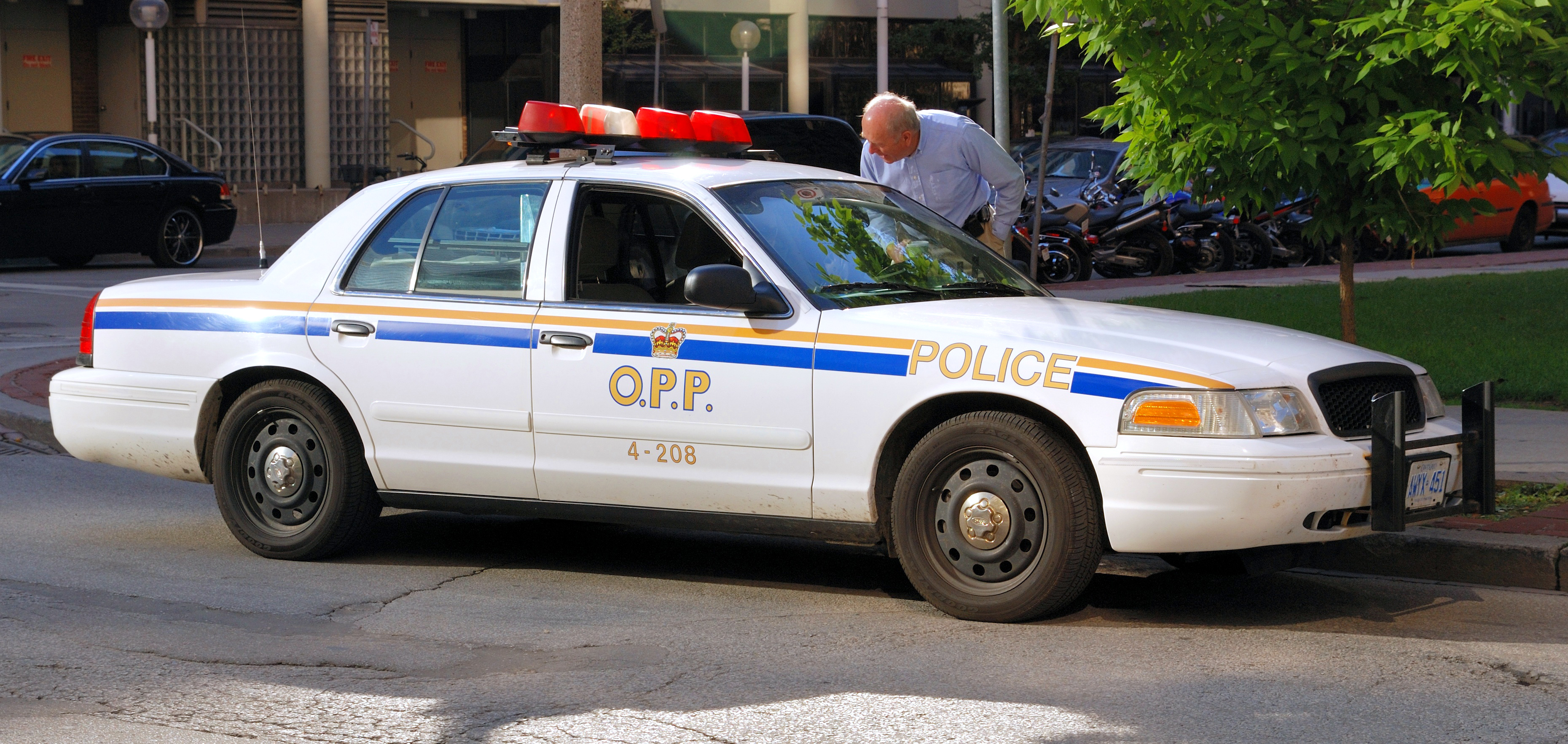
OPP Ford Crown Victoria painted in an all-white livery with blue and gold striping, used from 1989 to 2007.

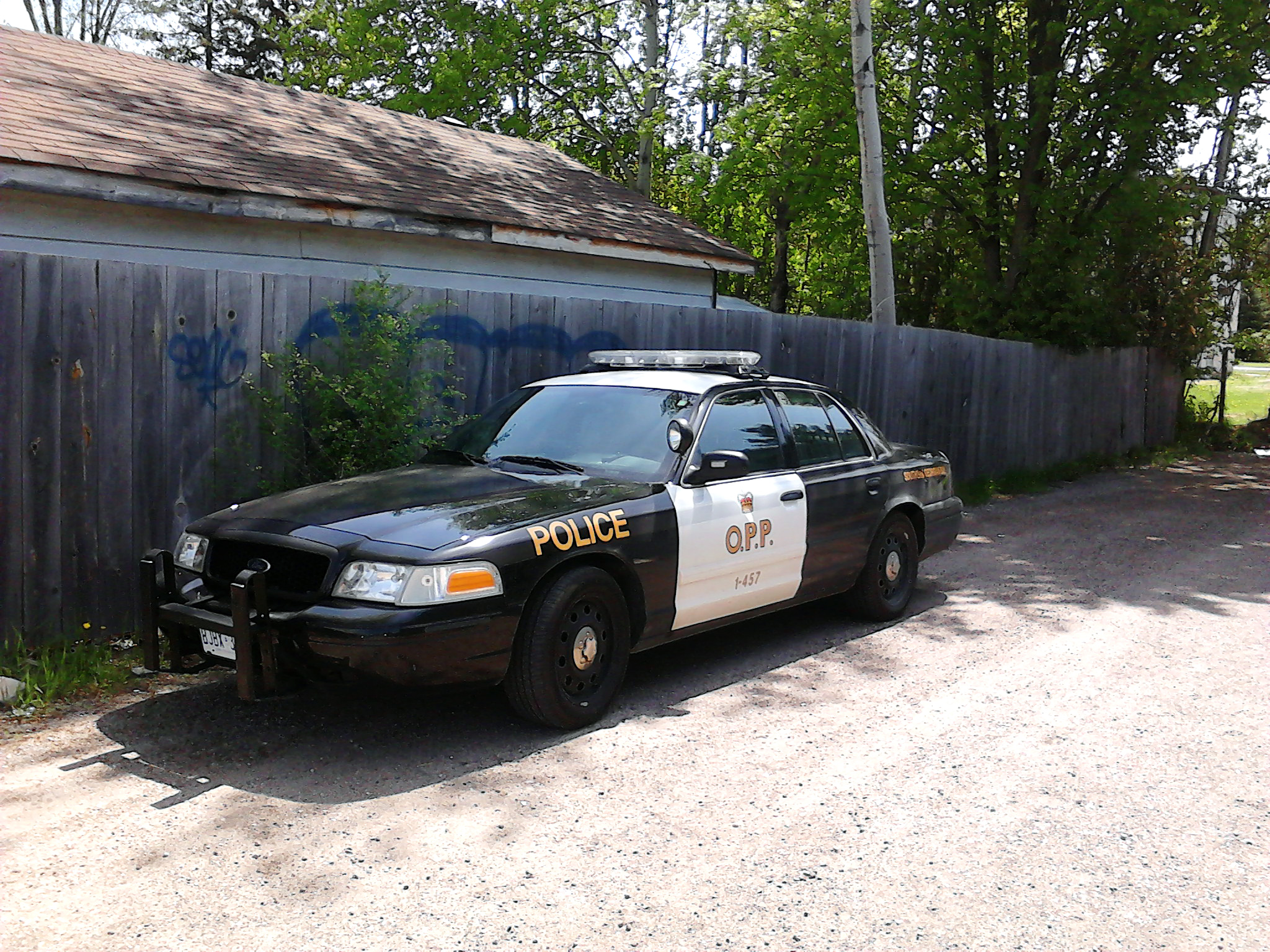
OPP Ford Crown Victoria painted in a black-and-white colour scheme, used from 1941 to 1989 and again since 2007.

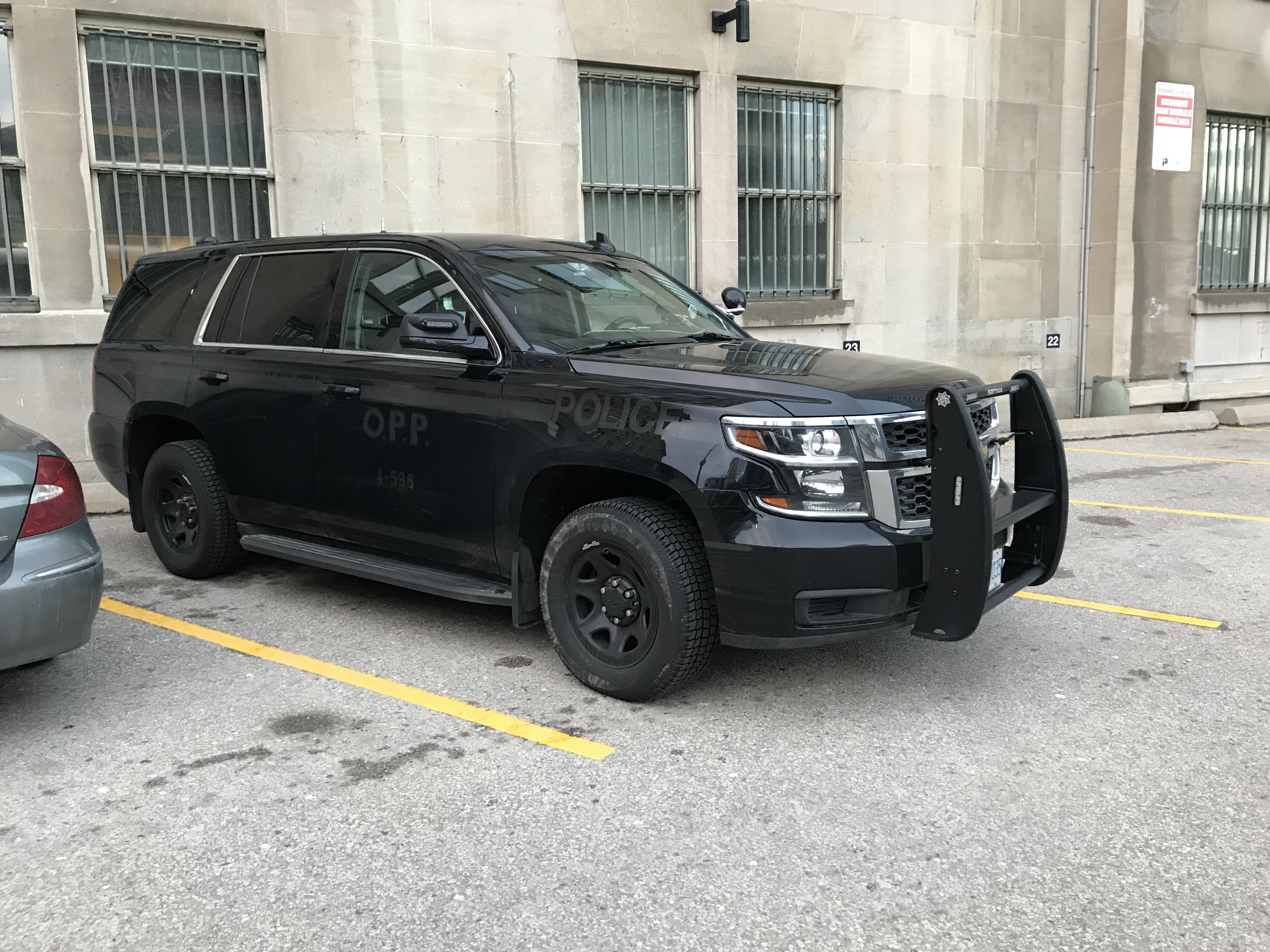
OPP Chevrolet Tahoe 4th Gen with the ghosted / stealth livery. Vehicles with this livery are less common than the black-and-white colour scheme and instead used more often during specific operations.

The OPP has approximately 5,200 cruisers in service across the province according to the 2023 Annual Report. Officers mainly patrol using all-wheel drive versions of the Ford Taurus Police Interceptor, Ford Explorer Police Utility, Ford F-150 Police Responder, Dodge Charger Pursuit, Dodge Durango Special Service Package, Chevrolet Silverado, Chevrolet Tahoe, and Ram 2500 Power Wagon for frontline patrol. For specialized roles, a variety of vehicles are used, such as the Chevrolet Suburban, Ford F250 Super Duty, and the Cambli International Thunder 1 armoured rescue vehicles used by the Tactics and Rescue Unit, as well as an International-based truck used by the Highway Safety Division and Mobile Support Units. Previously, models of the Ford Crown Victoria and Chevrolet Impala were used.

During the 2022-23 fiscal year, the OPP engaged in a proof-of-concept program in East Region which included the deployment and implementation of In-Car Camera Systems which includes an integrated Automatic Licence Plate Recognition (ALPR) technology. In March 2023, the OPP completed a provincial implementation of In-Car Camera systems with integrated ALPR into over 1,300 frontline vehicles across all regions of the province.

Historically, from 1941 to 1989, the OPP livery was black and white. In 1989, in response to manufacturers no longer offering dual tone vehicles, the OPP switched to an all-white livery with blue and gold striping. Vehicles of this era were equipped with Federal Signal's Vector light bars with integrated traffic advisers. In 2007, the OPP announced that it would return to a black and white colour scheme. The colour scheme is accomplished with the use of vinyl wraps during in-house vehicle outfitting. The change was implemented starting in March 2007 and was completed in 2009. Vehicles of this era had detachment markings on the rear quarter panel and used Federal Signal Arjent S2 light bars. Current vehicles have eschewed the detachment markings and are equipped with Whelen Legacy light bars. Unmarked vehicles are generally white, black, grey or dark blue. All marked cruisers are equipped with pushbars, also generally have black steel rims, and spotlights mounted on the driver side. Licence plates on the cruisers are generally the standard Ontario licence plates with a special validation sticker denoting permanent registration.

==== Aviation ====
As of February 2023, the OPP has the following aircraft listed with Transport Canada as the Province Of Ontario, Ministry of Community Safety and Correctional Services, and operate as Nav Canada airline designator GD, and telephony GUARDIAN.

- 2 Eurocopter EC135 P2+
- 2 Pilatus PC12NG - personnel and prisoner transport, First Nations policing support
- 1 Cessna 206 Turbo - traffic enforcement

Unmanned aerial vehicles

- 15 DJI Mavic 2 Enterprise Dual Advanced
- 28 DJI Avata
- 1 DJI Mavic 2 Pro
- 6 DJI Mavic Air
- 4 DJI M30T
- 3 DJI M300
- 4 DJI Mavic 3T
- 4 Autel Evo II Pro

==== Marine ====
- Kanter Marine "Chris D. Lewis" 38-foot police boat
- Boston Whaler 24-foot police boat

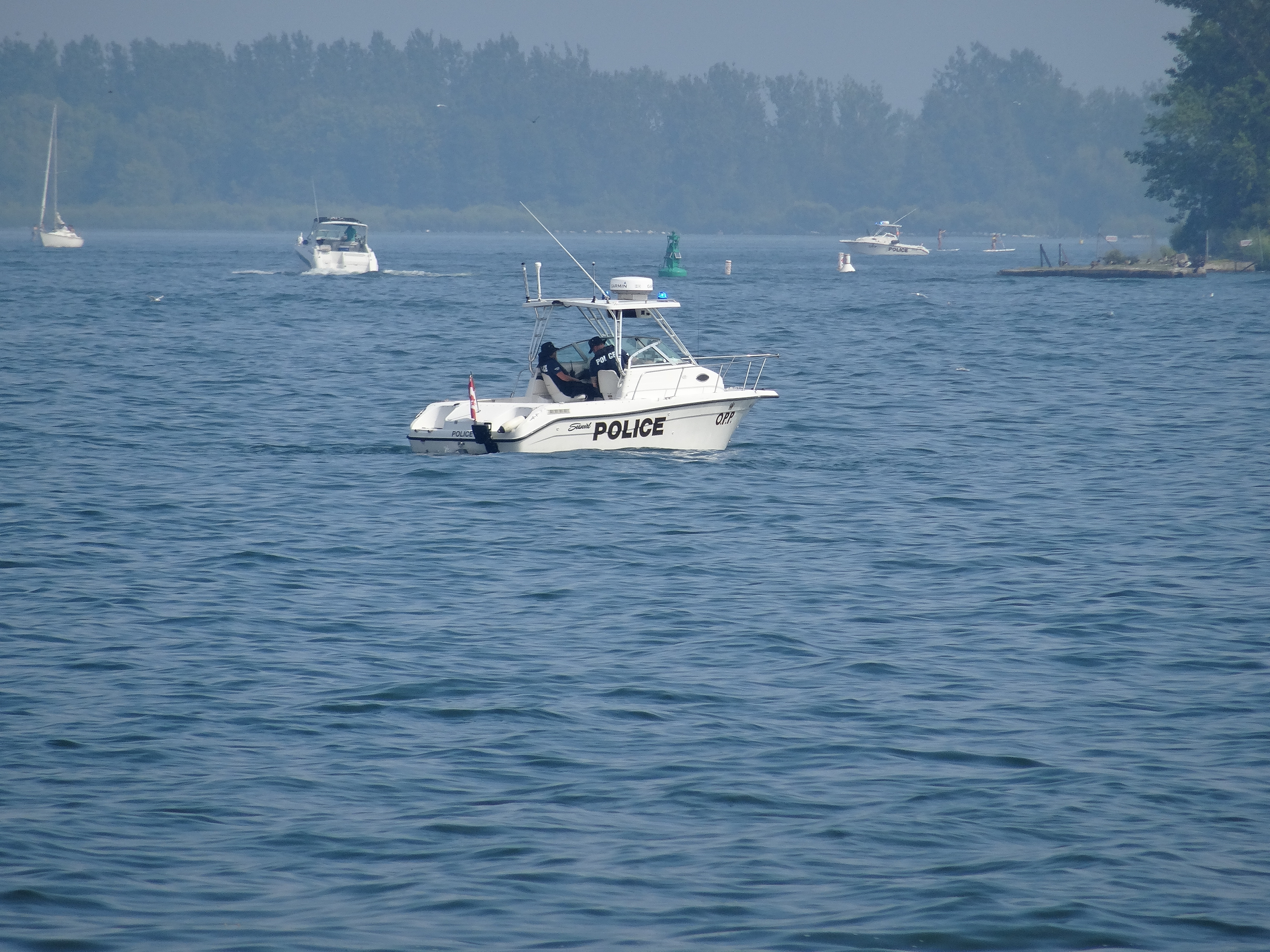
An OPP patrol boat in the Toronto Harbour, 2015

=== Weapons ===
Ontario Provincial Police officers carry a variety of use of force equipment in the performance of their duties. The current sidearm of the OPP is the Glock 17M pistol in 9x19mm. The OPP allows its police officers to use a weapon mounted light (WML) if they choose to do so. Previously, officers were issued either the Sig Sauer P229 DAO, or the P229R DAK in .40S&W. Patrol vehicles are also equipped with the Colt Canada C8 patrol rifle in 5.56x45mm NATO, with the option of the Remington 870 in 12 gauge. All uniformed officers carry TASER X2 or TASER 7 conducted energy weapons

The Tactics and Rescue Unit have more specialized weapons at their disposal including:

- Accuracy International AW
- Armalite AR10
- Colt Canada C8 patrol CQB carbine
- Knights Armament SR25
- Heckler & Koch MP5

== Controversies ==
=== Ipperwash Crisis ===
The Ipperwash Provincial Park is a former provincial park in Lambton County, Ontario. On 4 September 1995, first nations people occupied the park to bring attention to decades-old land claims that had not been recognized, resulting in the Ipperwash Crisis. The park had been expropriated from the Stoney Point Ojibway during World War II. The protest increased in tensions, resulting in the shooting and subsequent death of a protester, Anthony O'Brien "Dudley" George, by Acting Sergeant Ken Deane of the Tactics and Rescue Unit. Deane was subsequently convicted of criminal negligence causing death. In 2003, an inquiry called the Ipperwash Inquiry, into the events at Ipperwash was convened, and concluded in 2007. The OPP now uses a variety of different methods in resolving conflicts at major events, most notably by the use of the Provincial Liaison Teams (PLT), formerly known as the Major Event Liaison Team (MELT)

=== John Doe v. Ontario (Information and Privacy Commissioner) ===
In 1993 an Ontario Divisional Court case, John Doe v. Ontario (Information and Privacy Commissioner), Judge Matlow of the Ontario Divisional Court, suspected that four officers of the Toronto Police Service engaged in a fabrication of evidence and harassment of an accused party. Judge Matlow under the Ontario Freedom of Information and Protection of Privacy Act (FIPPA), sought access to the report of the Ontario Provincial Police exonerating the officers, but was denied access to it by the OPP. Access was later granted by the FIPPA commissioner, but a judicial review of the FIPPA commissioner's order to release the report resulted in publication of the OPP report being banned.

=== Ontario Provincial Police Association ===
The OPPA was established in 1954 to represent sworn and civilian members of the OPP, as well as OPP retirees. In March 2015, the Royal Canadian Mounted Police announced they were investigating fraud allegations against three top executives of the OPPA.

=== Appointment of Ron Taverner ===
In 2018, Toronto Police Superintendent Ron Taverner was nominated to replace outgoing Commissioner Vince Hawkes. The appointment of Taverner brought about controversy given the personal relationship between him and Premier Doug Ford, potential nepotism, and the OPP's role in investigating political corruption. It was also discovered that the requirements of the position were changed to allow someone in rank equivalent to Taverner to apply. Ultimately, Taverner rescinded his interest in the position, resulting in the appointment of York Regional Police Deputy Chief Thomas Carrique as the OPP's new commissioner.

== In popular culture ==
The Beatles's 1967 album Sgt. Pepper's Lonely Hearts Club Band contains cover art with Paul McCartney wearing an OPP patch on his fictional uniform (more easily seen in the gatefold picture). In January 2016 the origins of the patch was confirmed as a gift from an OPP corporal on 28 September 1964, at Malton Airport as the Beatles were on their way to Montreal.

On the online social networking website Habbo Hotel Canada, OPP officers and spokespersons visit the online application to talk to teens on board the web site's "Infobus". During the weekly sessions, users of the Habbo service are able to ask the officers and spokespersons questions, primarily regarding online safety.

=== Film and television ===
In the television series Cardinal, the OPP is fictionalized as the Ontario Police Department (OPD), with a shoulder patch similar to that of the actual OPP except that the top element is replaced by three stylized maple leaves on a branch. OPP cruisers in the series are marked similar to actual cruisers, however the Queen's crown is replaced with a stylized beaver, and the vehicles are marked "O.P.D." instead of "O.P.P." In 2016, Discovery in Canada and The Weather Channel in the United States aired the reality TV series Heavy Rescue: 401, following members of the OPP and local heavy tow operators, profiling their efforts during events and routine operations on the cross-provincial Highway 401 and other 400-series highways in the Greater Toronto Area.

In the Canadian horror film Pontypool, the OPP is called into the eponymous town to control a zombie outbreak, ultimately resulting in a massacre. The film's lead character, Grant Mazzy, vocally denounces the OPP's actions on the radio.
