= Orillia Opera House =

Historic building in Ontario, Canada

Coordinates: 44.6083°N 79.4203°W

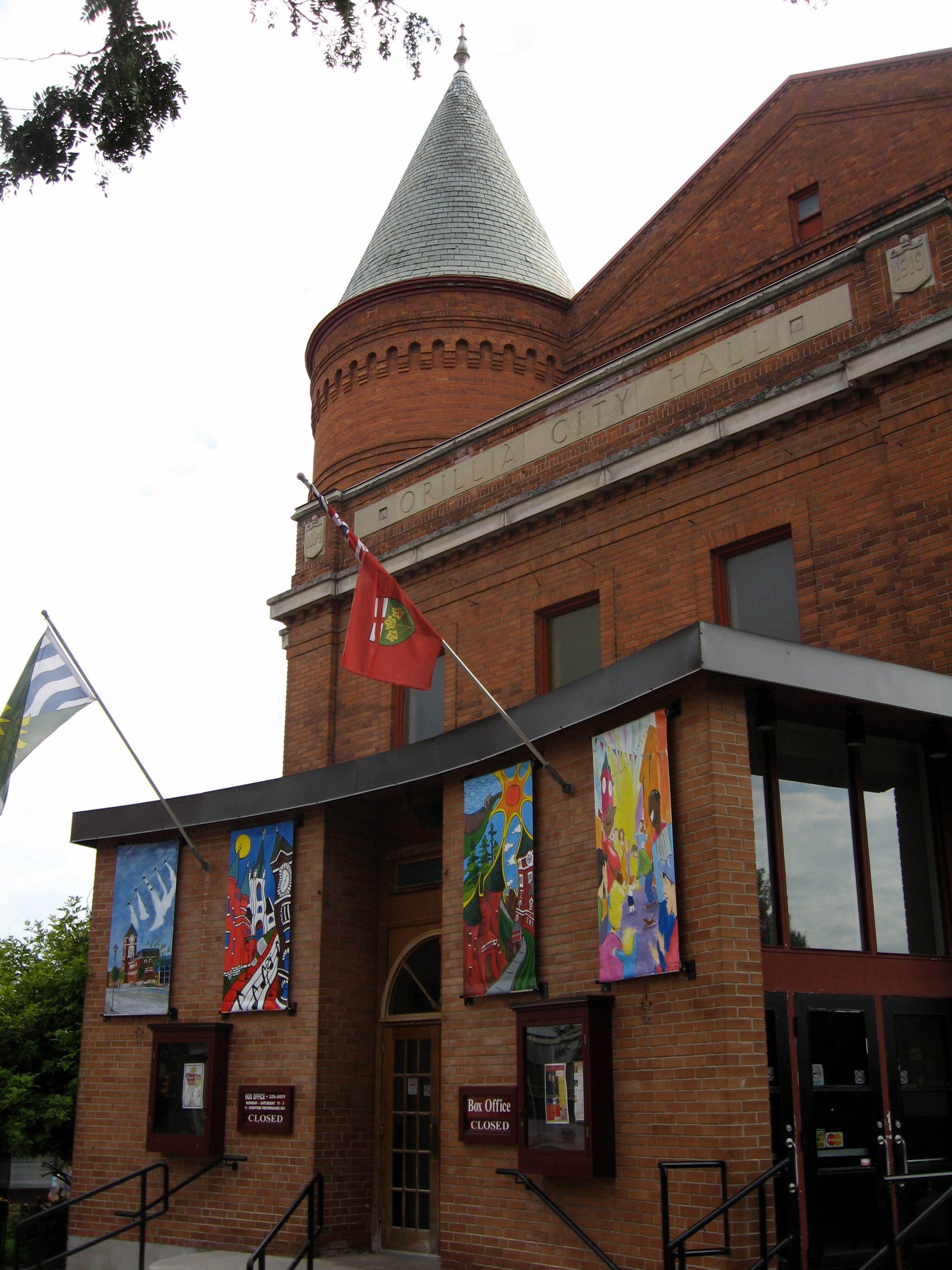
Orillia Opera House main entrance

The Orillia Opera House is a historic building in the city of Orillia, Ontario, Canada. It has been listed as a historic property under the Ontario Heritage Act.

== History ==
The Richardsonian Romanesque building was built in 1895, replacing the first permanent town hall built in 1874, to house Orillia City Council and the local jail. The original structure was designed by Toronto architecture firm Gordon & Helliwell and completed in 1895.

A fire in 1915 destroyed much of the building and was rebuilt (with plans from Burke, Horwood and White) less the south tower when it re-opened in 1917. The rebuilt structure retains Richardsonian Romanesque style. A new front entrance was completed in 1958. The building's interior consisted of Council chambers, a 905-seat auditorium, city hall offices, library, market stalls and jail. Orillia City Council vacated in 1997 and Orillia Opera became the sole tenant in the building.

== Gordon Lightfoot Auditorium ==
The 700 seat auditorium served as a movie house from the 1920s to the late 1950s. In October, 1997, it was renamed in honour of local legend Gordon Lightfoot who had performed there since he was a child.

== Past performers ==
The Orillia Opera House has featured such artists as the Marx Brothers, Glenn Gould, Oscar Peterson, K.D. Lang, Mickey Rooney, Dan Hill, Liona Boyd, Blue Rodeo, Gerry Dee, Ron James, Lighthouse, The Stampeders, David Clayton Thomas, Bruce Cockburn and Gordon Lightfoot.
