= Fat River (Canada) =

- Location of the river mouth in Ontario

Location
- Country: Canada
- Province: Ontario
- Region: Northwestern Ontario
- District: Kenora

Physical characteristics
- Source: Unnamed lake
  - coordinates: 54°23′45″N 88°01′53″W
  - elevation: 156 m (512 ft)
- Mouth: Fawn River
  - coordinates: 54°36′08″N 88°03′54″W
  - elevation: 112 m (367 ft)

Basin features
- River system: Hudson Bay drainage basin

The Fat River is a river in northwestern Kenora District in northwestern Ontario, Canada. It is in the Hudson Bay drainage basin and is a right tributary of the Fawn River.

The Fat River begins at an unnamed lake and flows north to its mouth at the Fawn River. The Fawn River flows via the Severn River to Hudson Bay.

== Sources ==
- Map 18 (PDF) (Map). 1 : 1,600,000. Official road map of Ontario. Ministry of Transportation of Ontario. 2014.
