= Tudhope Building =

Building in Ontario, Canada

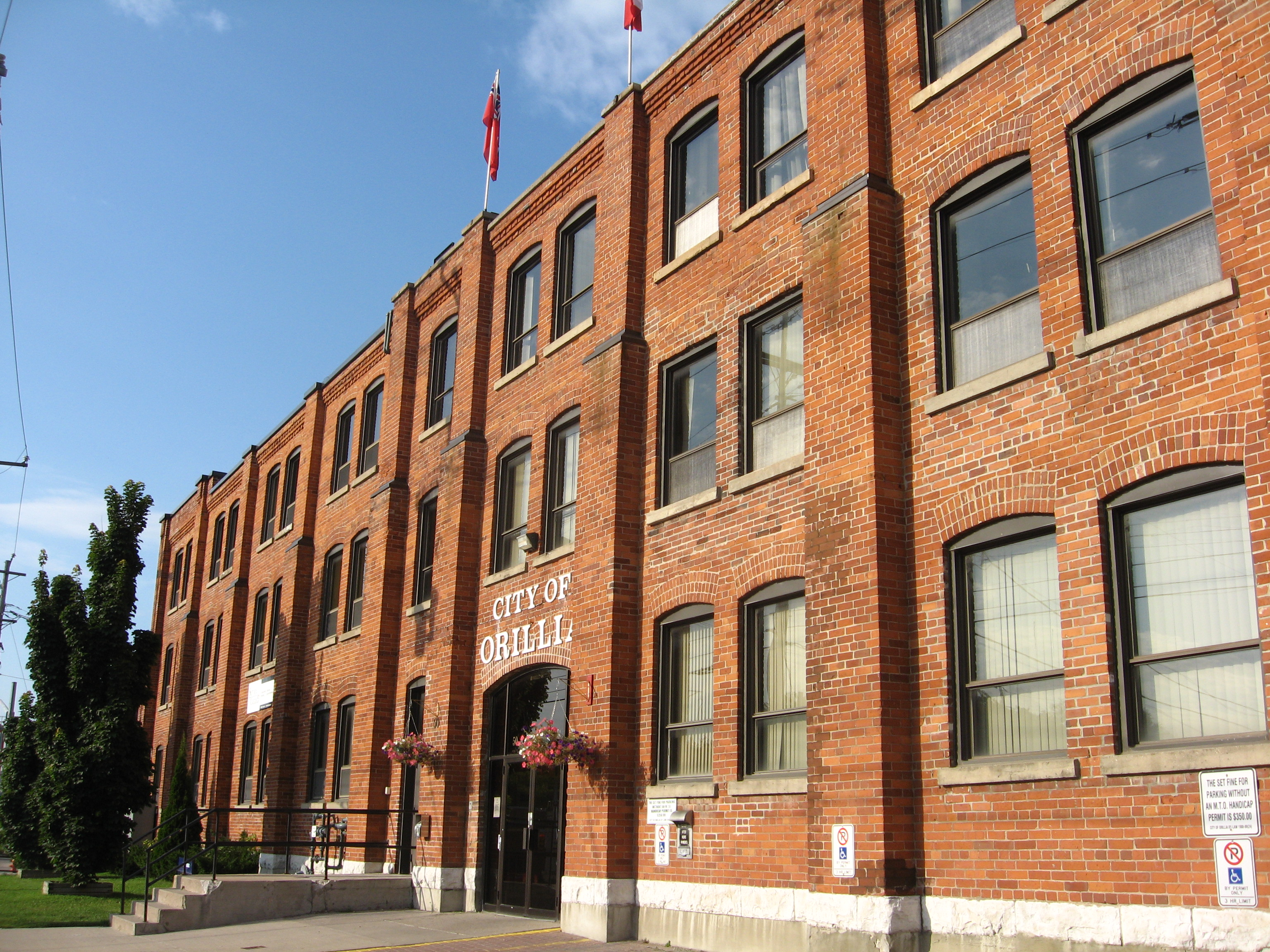
- Orillia City Hall wing of Tudhope Building

- Location within Southern Ontario
- Etymology: Named for James Brockett Tudhope

General information
- Location: Orillia, Ontario, Canada
- Coordinates: 44.606529°N 79.419324°W
- Current tenants: City of Orillia, Lakehead University, private residences
- Completed: 1909

Tudhope Building is a multi-use building with western wing home to Orillia City Council since 1997 while the eastern wing is used as condominiums and as a satellite location for Lakehead University. From 1909 to 1990s it was a manufacturing facility. The building is named for James Brockett Tudhope, who founded the Tudhope Motor Company and later served as reeve/mayor of Orillia.

== Car Plant ==
The building was formerly home to Tudhope Carriage and Motor Company built in 1909 and became home to the 'Tudhope Anderson Company from 1910 to 1936.

== War Production ==
The building was a war plant supply military parts during World War I and World War II.

== OTACO/Redlaw Industries ==
Tudhope Anderson Company was renamed as Orillia Tudhope Anderson Company (OTACO) in 1936 and switchted to producing consumer goods, sold to R.M. Barr (later as Bartaco) in 1961 and later sold to Redlaw Industries in 1984 which closed the plant in 1990.

== OPP Headquarters ==
During the early 1990s the building was used as Ontario Provincial Police Headquarters until their new building was completed in 1995.

== Conversion ==
Since the 1995 the building has been converted for institutional use. In 2004 while undergoing renovations when parts of the building collapsed.

The western wing houses Orillia City Hall/Council and the eastern wing is used as condominiums and as a satellite location for Lakehead University.
