= Ontario Provincial Police Headquarters =

Coordinates: 44.583°N 79.430°W

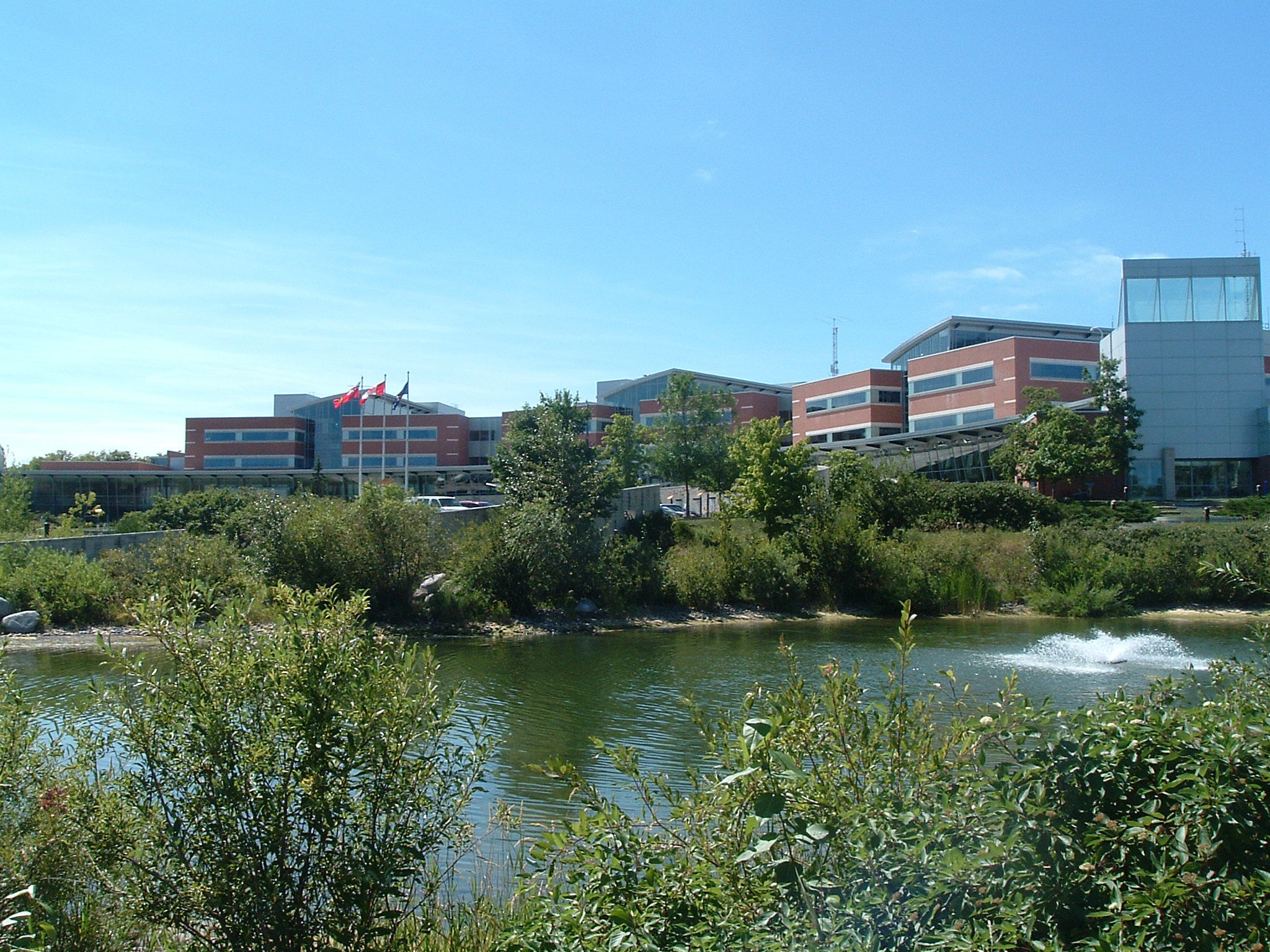
OPP Headquarters in 2004

Ontario Provincial Police Headquarters (Lincoln M. Alexander Building) is the main administration office for the Ontario Provincial Police. The building is located at 777 Memorial Avenue in Orillia, Ontario. It was completed in 1995 and is the first building constructed specifically to house the OPP headquarters.

== Ontario Provincial Police Museum ==
The building has a small gift shop and museum on the ground floor which are open to the public, but all other sections are off limits. The museum displays vehicles, uniforms and other artifacts relating to the OPP since 1909.

== Historical headquarters buildings from 1922 to 1995 ==
The current building opened in 1995 and is the latest of several buildings to house the OPP headquarters. Previous locations have included:

- 1922–?: Queen's Park in Toronto, 2nd floor offices
- 1973–1990s: Workmen's Compensation Board Building at 90 Harbour Street in Toronto
- 1990s–1995: Tudhope Building in Orillia, now used by Orillia City Hall and Lakehead University

== Gallery of former headquarters ==
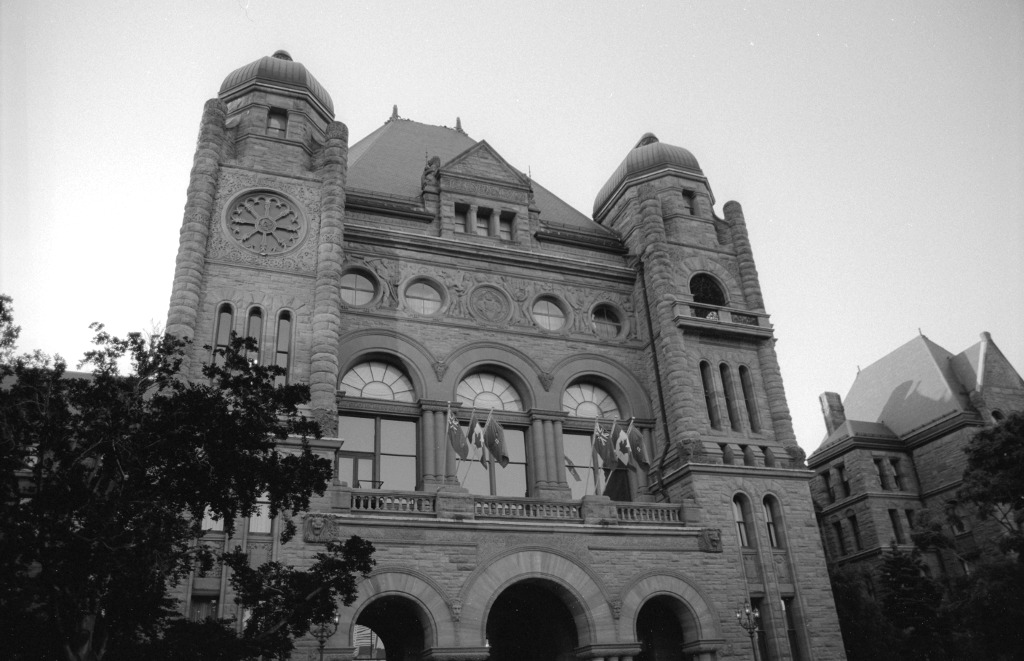
The first headquarters was located at Queen's Park in 1922

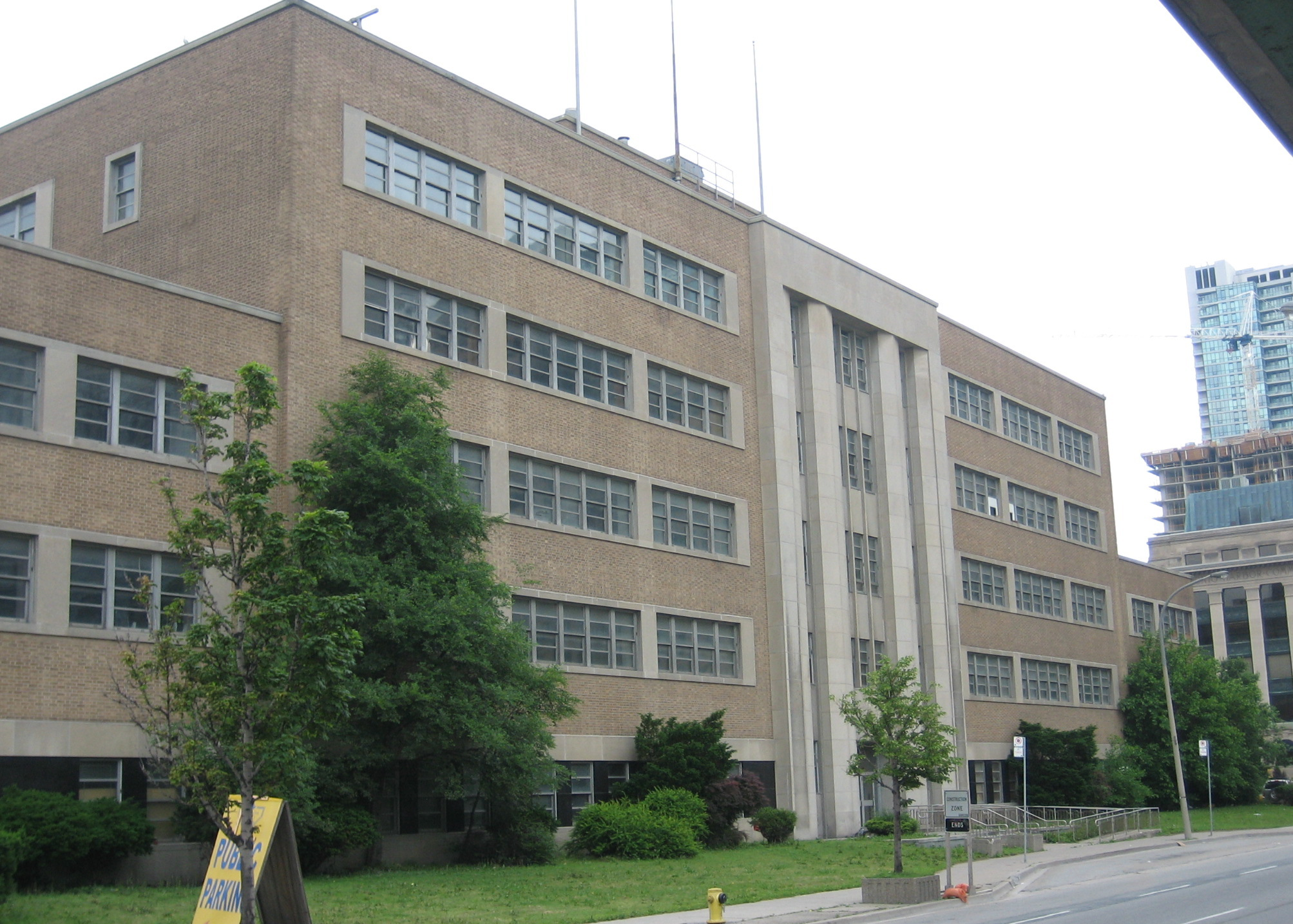
OPP Headquarters in Toronto from 1973 to the early 1990s

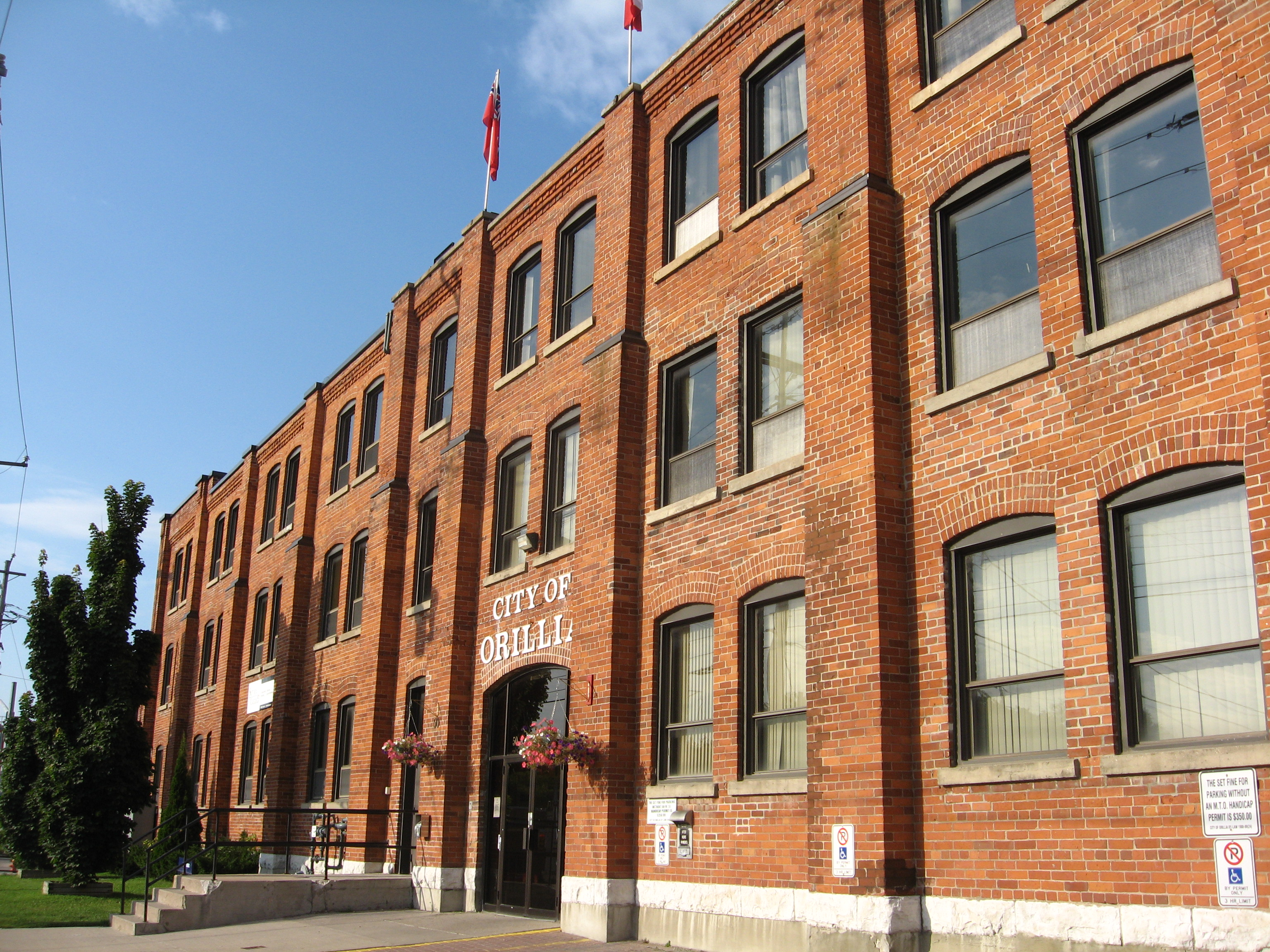
Tudhope Building in Orillia
