= Pitticow River =

- Location of the mouth of the Pitticow River in Ontario

Location
- Country: Canada
- Province: Ontario
- Region: Northwestern Ontario
- District: Kenora District

Physical characteristics
- Source: Unnamed lake
  - coordinates: 54°32′14″N 87°52′03″W
  - elevation: 126 m (413 ft)
- Mouth: Fawn River
  - coordinates: 54°52′58″N 87°45′58″W
  - elevation: 87 m (285 ft)

Basin features
- River system: Hudson Bay drainage basin

The Pitticow River is a river in the north of the Unorganized Part of Kenora District in Northwestern Ontario, Canada. It is in the Hudson Bay drainage basin and is a right tributary of the Fawn River. The Pitticow River can be used to cross between the Severn River/ Fawn River drainage basin to the Winisk River drainage basin, the next major basin to the east.

== See also ==
- List of rivers of Ontario

== Sources ==
- Map 19 (PDF) (Map). 1 : 1,600,000. Official road map of Ontario. Ministry of Transportation of Ontario. 2010-01-01.
