= Fawn River (Ontario) =

- Location of the mouth of the Fawn River in Ontario

Location
- Country: Canada
- Province: Ontario
- Region: Northwestern Ontario
- District: Kenora District
- Part: Unorganized Part

Physical characteristics
- Source: Unnamed lake
  - coordinates: 53°46′06″N 90°40′30″W
  - elevation: 215 m (705 ft)
- Mouth: Severn River
  - coordinates: 55°21′42″N 88°19′48″W
  - elevation: 44 m (144 ft)

Basin features
- River system: Hudson Bay drainage basin
- Tributaries
  - left: Poplar River, Burning River
  - right: Pitticow River, Fat River, Otter River, Little Otter River

The Fawn River is a river in the north of the Unorganized Part of Kenora District in Northwestern Ontario, Canada. It is in the Hudson Bay drainage basin and is a right tributary of the Severn River. The Severn/Fawn basin is one of the last few remaining undammed and unregulated watersheds south of the 55th parallel in North America.

== Geography ==
The river begins at an unnamed lake and flows northeast through Fawn Lake to Big Trout Lake, the location of the Kitchenuhmaykoosib Inninuwug First Nation (also called the Big Trout Lake First Nation). The river exits the lake at the east and flows north to Angling Lake, the location of the Wapekeka First Nation. The river heads northeast over Ashaway Falls and Crandall Falls, and takes in the right tributaries Little Otter River, Otter River and Fat River. It turns north, takes in the right tributary Pitticow River, then heads northwest. It receives the left tributaries Burning River and Poplar River, and reaches its mouth at the Severn River, which flows to Hudson Bay.

=== Tributaries ===
- Poplar River (left)
- Burning River (left)
- Pitticow River (right)
- Sugar Creek (right)
- Mink Creek (right)
- Stout Creek (right)
- Fat River (right)
- Otter River (right)
- Little Otter River (right)

== Fawn River Provincial Park ==
Fawn River Provincial Park
- IUCN category II (national park)
- Interactive map of Fawn River Provincial Park
- Coordinates: 53°49′57″N 89°32′39″W
- Area: 12,134 ha (46.85 sq mi)
- Designation: Waterway
- Established: 1989
- Governing body: Ontario Parks
- Website: www.ontarioparks.com/park/fawnriver

Fawn River Provincial Park is a linear waterway park that consists of 2 noncontiguous sections, protecting a 200 metres (660 ft) wide strip of land on both sides of the Fawn River. The first section runs from its source to Big Trout Lake, and includes Fawn Lake. The second section runs downstream from Angling Lake at Wapekeka Reserve No. 2. It was established in May 1989.

The park is notable for its position on the transition zone between the boreal and sub-arctic forest.

It is a non-operating park without any facilities or services. The park can be used for recreational activities such as fishing, hunting, canoeing, camping and snowmobiling.

== Transportation ==
The river can be accessed by air from Big Trout Lake Airport and Angling Lake/Wapekeka Airport.

== See also ==
- List of rivers of Ontario

== Sources ==
- Map 18 (PDF) (Map). 1 : 1,600,000. Official road map of Ontario. Ministry of Transportation of Ontario. 2010-01-01.
- Map 19 (PDF) (Map). 1 : 1,600,000. Official road map of Ontario. Ministry of Transportation of Ontario. 2010-01-01.
