= Burning River (Ontario) =

- Location of the mouth of the Burning River in Ontario

Location
- Country: Canada
- Province: Ontario
- Region: Northwestern Ontario
- District: Kenora District

Physical characteristics
- Source: Unnamed bog
  - coordinates: 54°50′20″N 87°56′37″W
  - elevation: 105 m (344 ft)
- Mouth: Fawn River
  - coordinates: 54°58′44″N 87°56′49″W
  - elevation: 83 m (272 ft)

Basin features
- River system: Hudson Bay drainage basin

The Burning River is a river in the Hudson Bay drainage basin in the north of the Unorganized Part of Kenora District in Northwestern Ontario, Canada. The river flows north from an unnamed bog to its mouth as a left tributary of the Fawn River, which flows via the Severn River to Hudson Bay.

== See also ==
- List of rivers of Ontario

== Sources ==
- Map 19 (PDF) (Map). 1 : 1,600,000. Official road map of Ontario. Ministry of Transportation of Ontario. 2010-01-01.
