= Big Trout Lake =

Lake in Kenora District, Ontario, Canada

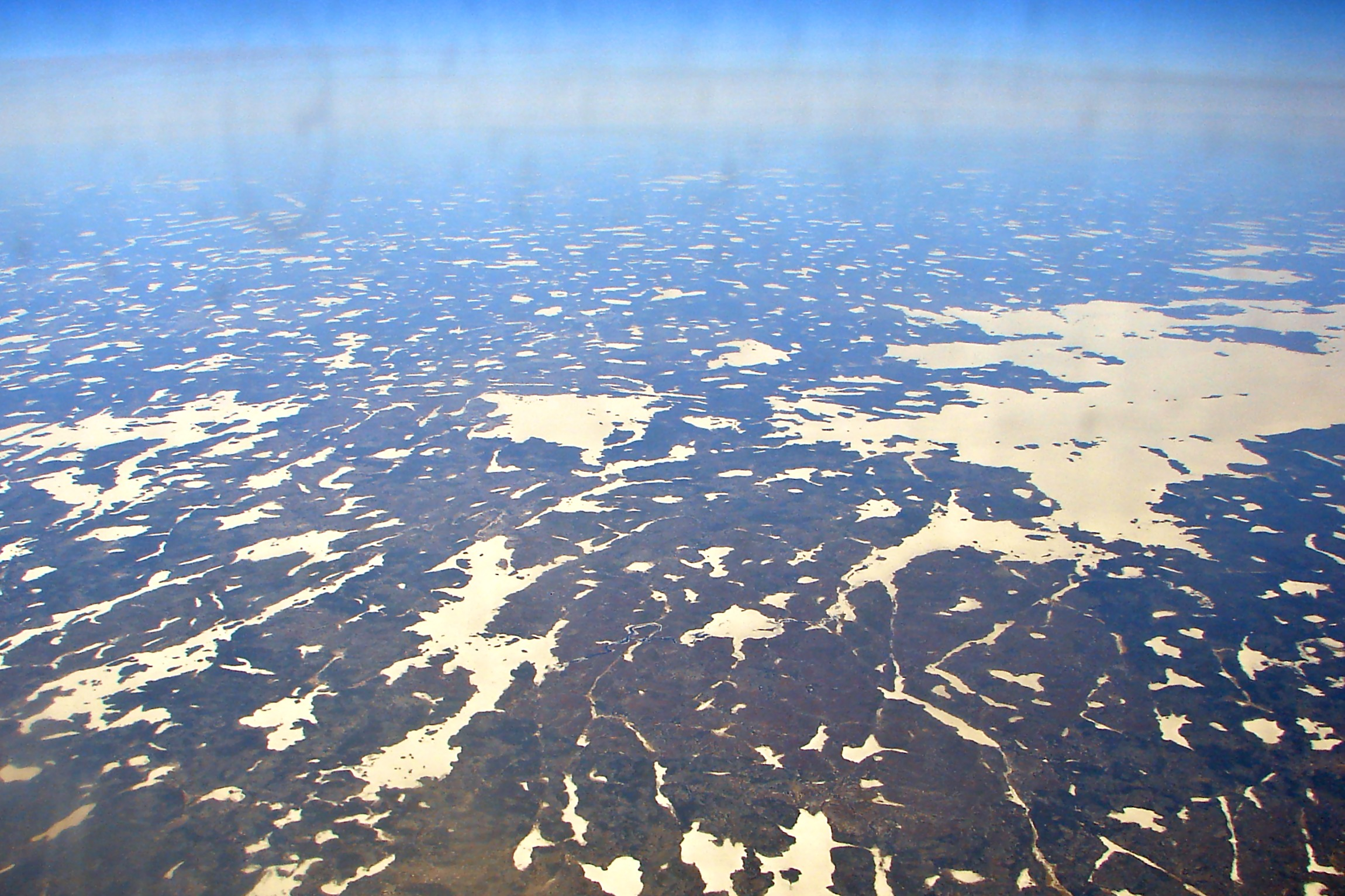
- Aerial view of Big Trout Lake (largest lake at centre right)

- Location within Ontario
- Location: Kenora District, Ontario
- Coordinates: 53°47′00″N 90°00′26″W
- Primary inflows: Fawn River
- Primary outflows: Fawn River
- Catchment area: 4,350 km^{2} (1,680 sq mi)
- Basin countries: Canada
- Max. length: 57 km (35 mi)
- Max. width: 23 km (14 mi)
- Surface area: 645.6 km^{2} (249.3 sq mi)
- Surface elevation: 211 m (692 ft)
- Islands: Big Island, Post Island

Big Trout Lake is a large lake in Northern Ontario. The Fawn River fills it from the west and drains it from the east. The reserve of the Kitchenuhmaykoosib Inninuwug First Nation, also known as Big Trout Lake, is on Post Island near the northern shore.

== See also ==
- List of lakes in Ontario
