= One Dead Indian =

2001 non-fiction book

One Dead Indian: The Premier, the Police, and the Ipperwash Crisis
- Author: Peter Edwards
- Published: Toronto
- Publisher: Stoddart, McClelland & Stewart
- Publication date: 2001
- Publication place: Canada
- Pages: 267
- ISBN: 0773733213
- OCLC: 47365241

One Dead Indian: The Premier, the Police, and the Ipperwash Crisis is a book by Canadian investigative journalist Peter Edwards (born 1956) about the 1995 Ipperwash Crisis and the shooting death of aboriginal land claims protester Dudley George by the Ontario Provincial Police on September 7, 1995. It was first published by Stoddart in 2001 and reprinted several times and published as an ebook.

The book examines the circumstances surrounding George's death during the Ipperwash standoff, the role of the Ontario Provincial Police, and the provincial government, Progressive Conservative under then Premier Mike Harris who had won the Ontario general election on June 26, 1995. On September 4, 1995, a group of unarmed members of Chippewas of Kettle and Stony Point First Nation were protesting against the ongoing occupation of Stony Point land, which included burial grounds. (Note: During a confrontation, Ontario Provincial Police Acting OPP Sgt. Kenneth Deane fired on the demonstrators and killed Dudley George. Dean was convicted in 1997 "of criminal negligence causing death after a court ruled he did not have a "reasonable belief" that George was armed." The Liberal government, under then Premier Dalton McGuinty called for an inquest which submitted its final report in 2005.)

The land had been appropriated by the federal government in 1942 under the War Measures Act to build a military camp, Camp Ipperwash, and never returned to the First Nations as had been agreed. According to Quill and Quire, within 24 hours of the arrival of the Ontario Provincial Police one protester was shot and wounded; one was beaten until his heart stopped and then revived; and Anthony "Dudley" George was shot dead.

In 2004–2005, the book was adapted into a 2005 movie by CTV, which was broadcast on television on January 4, 2006.

== Reviews and inquiry ==
A 2004 review by Suzanne Methot in Quill and Quire described how the book by Edwards', who was an investigative reporter for The Toronto Star, "clearly detailed events" that led up to the Ipperwash crisis. Methot wrote that "Edwards’s exhaustive and well-written examination of Ipperwash shows ...[that] aboriginal people need protection from the police" in Canada.

She also noted that the United Nation and Amnesty International raised concerns about the incident. Methot described how Edwards based his book on minutes of meetings between the newly elected Premier Mike Harris and the OPP and other documents obtained by Access to Information requests, trial transcripts, Special Investigations Unit interviews, officers’ logs, and telephone conversations from the OPP command centre on the night of the shooting."

The Ipperwash Inquiry resulted in a four-volume report on the crisis.

== Books and Video ==
- Edwards, Peter (2001). One Dead Indian: The Premier, the Police, and the Ipperwash Crisis. Toronto, Ontario: McClelland & Stewart (published April 2003). p. 267. ISBN 0-7710-3047-9. OCLC 47365241.
- Edwards, Peter (April 2003) [2001]. One Dead Indian: The Premier, the Police, and the Ipperwash Crisis. Toronto, Ontario: McClelland & Stewart. p. 267. ISBN 0-7710-3047-9. OCLC 47365241.
- One Dead Indian [videorecording] / a Sienna Films/Park Ex Pictures production; produced by Jennifer Kawaja, Julia Sereny, Kevin Tierney; directed by Tim Southam. [Thornhill, Ontario]: Mongrel Media, c2006. DVD231 Mongrel Media. 1 DVD-video (90 min): sd., col.; 12 cm.
