= Ipperwash (disambiguation) =

Ipperwash may refer to:

- The Ipperwash Crisis, a land dispute crisis in Ontario, Canada
- Ipperwash Provincial Park, a provincial park in Ontario, Canada
- Camp Ipperwash, a former Canadian Armed Forces training site
