= Sam George (activist) =

Canadian activist (1952–2009)

Maynard Donald "Sam" George OOnt (July 1, 1952 – June 3, 2009) was a Canadian native rights activist. His brother Dudley George was killed following a standoff with Ontario Provincial Police during the Ipperwash Crisis. Sam played an important role in forcing a judicial inquiry, the Ipperwash Inquiry into the events at Ipperwash.

He was born in Windsor, Ontario, the son of Reginald George and Genevieve Rogers, the fifth of ten children. Both parents served in the Canadian military during World War II and had been forced off the Stoney Point Reserve by the Canadian government in 1942. George learned the trade of carpentry and later worked as a youth counsellor for the Kettle and Stony Point First Nation. He also coached amateur hockey.

George was named to the Order of Ontario in 2008. In presenting the award, Ontario's Lieutenant-Governor said "Sam George was steadfast in his quest for justice for his brother and his community. He is an inspiration to all Ontarians."

On May 28, 2009, control of the former Ipperwash Provincial Park was returned to the Kettle and Stony Point First Nation.

George died of pancreatic and lung cancer on the Kettle Point reserve near Sarnia at the age of 56.
