= Deb Hutton =

Canadian political figure

Deb Hutton is a former chief of staff to Premier Mike Harris and a current Metrolinx board member.

== Early life and education ==
Hutton's father worked in real estate and her mother was a teacher as she grew up in Listowel, Ontario.

Hutton earned her undergraduate degree in political science from the University of Western Ontario in 1988.

== Career ==
In 1995 Hutton was an executive assistant on the team working with Mike Harris. In 1996 Hutton was one of the attendees of a meeting that took place just prior to death of Anthony George, an event later known as the Ipperwash Crisis. Shortly thereafter, during a violent confrontation, the Ontario Provincial Police killed a protester. During the public inquiry the provincial government led by Harris were scrutinized for the 1995 Ipperwash Crisis. At that time, Hutton expressed "a desire to direct the police" to put a quick end to the occupation within two days. Later publications on the event also raise the question of whether Harris was making decisions during the event or Hutton.

From 2000 until 2003 Hutton was a vice president at Hydro One, and then as of 2003 she was a special advisor to Ernie Eves, then Premier of Ontario. Around this time she acquired the nickname "Premier Hutton" because of her influence on the politics of Eves' administration.

In 2004 Hutton worked on Belinda Stronach's campaign to lead the Conservative Party. Hutton guided Stronach through the process and Hutton considered Stronach to be easy to work with as Hutton laiddown guidelines to be followed during the campaign. The campaign was not successful, though in 2006 Hutton spoke on the large amount of media coverage received by the campaign.

Between October 2009 and October 2020 Hutton worked for TransCanada Enterprises, and this work later became of political interest to Canada's Liberal Party.

In 2017 Hutton wrote a column defending the policies of Patrick Brown.

Hutton was interim Chief of Staff to Minister Caroline Mulroney in 2020. Hutton helped Ford prepare for the 2022 Ontario general election, by acting as Andrea Horwath in mock debates. She has been on the board of Metrolinx since 2022.

Hutton worked for Premier Doug Ford in the aftermath of the Greenbelt scandal in a volunteer capacity. She advised Cabinet Ministers and their Chiefs of staff on how to avoid conflicts of interest.

== Personal life ==
Hutton is the wife of former Progressive Conservative Party of Ontario leader Tim Hudak. They were married in 2002.
