= Sidney B. Linden =

Former Chief Judge of the Ontario Court of Justice

The Honourable Sidney B. Linden CM OOnt QC
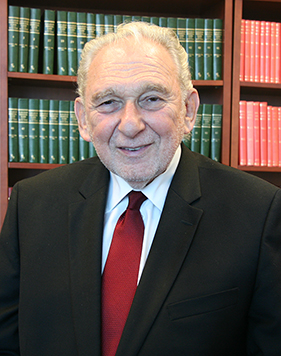

Chief Justice of the Ontario Court of Justice
- In office April 1990 – 1999

Personal details
- Born: Sidney Bryan Linden; November 9, 1938 (age 87) Toronto, Ontario
- Spouse: Beverley Joy Linden
- Relations: Allen Linden, Sandra Linden
- Children: Cary, Neil, Jonathan
- Education: University of Toronto (University College & Faculty of Law)
- Occupation: lawyer, judge

Sidney Bryan Linden CM OOnt QC is a former Chief Judge of the Ontario Court of Justice and a judicial reformer and administrator in the province of Ontario, Canada.

== Early career ==
Linden graduated with a Bachelor of Arts from University College in 1961 and a Bachelor of Laws (LLB) from the University of Toronto Faculty of Law in 1964. He was called to the bar in 1966. Linden became well known as a lawyer specializing in criminal defence and civil liberties, a number of his cases receiving public notice.

Linden was executive director and the first full-time general counsel (1966–67) for the fledgling Canadian Civil Liberties Association. Under his direction, the association applied for a grant from The Ford Foundation to improve its financial position.

He was an early member of the Criminal Lawyers' Association, serving as vice-president from 1975 to 1979. Linden worked on bail reform as co-director of the Amicus Foundation Toronto Bail Project (1967–68), which used interviews and a scoring system to assess the suitability of prisoners for personal bail or release on recognizance, thereby countering the tendency of then bail system to favour individuals with financial means. He was also a contributing editor (justice) for Maclean's Magazine and a member of the founding editorial board of Canadian Lawyer, first published in October 1977.

Linden was a supporter and active participant in the Legal Aid Plan of the Law Society of Upper Canada and worked for the plan's reform. He was co-chair of the Sub-Committee to Study the Delivery of Legal Aid Services, formed April 1978, whose recommendations let to improvements in the plan's capacity and infrastructure. During the plan's infancy, Linden was ejected from court by a judge for attempting to represent an accused as duty counsel.

== Career ==
=== Police Complaints Commissioner ===
A number of studies had been conducted on the subject of how to deal with public complaints about police conduct. At the request of then Attorney-General Roy McMurtry, Linden conducted research on police complaints processes, including practices in other jurisdictions, and proposed a model that was adopted by the province. He was subsequently appointed first Public Complaints Commissioner for Metropolitan Toronto and Chair of the Police Complaints Board (1981–85). This was a pilot project, combining elements of both police and civilian oversight, and by 1990 the Board's mandate was expanded to all of Ontario.

=== Executive Director of Canadian Auto Workers Legal Services Plan ===
From 1985 to 1988, Linden was Executive Director of the Canadian Auto Workers (CAW – now UNIFOR) Legal Services Plan, which continues to operate. This was the first plan of its kind in Canada, the result of negotiations over two years between CAW and the major auto manufacturers, and based on similar pre-paid legal service plans in the United States. Linden set up a head office and six branches, with 26 staff and 500 cooperating lawyers. Implementation problems included a dispute with the Law Society of Upper Canada (eventually resolved) over the cooperating lawyer model.

=== Information and Privacy Commissioner of Ontario ===
In 1988, Linden was appointed the first Information and Privacy Commissioner of Ontario. As an Officer of the Legislature, Linden's appointment was recommended by an all-party committee. Ontario's model unified the access-to-information and privacy-protection roles in a single commissioner, unlike the federal model with dual commissioners, and gave the commissioner order-making authority. Linden established and ran the IPC until 1990, designing the inquiry process and pioneering the use of paper as opposed to in-person hearings. Linden adopted a cautious approach in his decision-making, aware of precedents that would be set and of the need to withstand judicial scrutiny. His more than 120 formative decisions continue to be cited in IPC jurisprudence. Aside from hearing appeals, Linden issued recommendations on broader privacy and access issues, including employer disclosure of information about employees with AIDS, and the risk of document loss or improper disclosure from then-ubiquitous fax machines.

=== Chief Judge of the Ontario Court of Justice ===
In 1990, Linden's tenure at the IPC was cut short when he was tapped by then Attorney-General Ian Scott to lead the reorganization of the provincial court system. The Provincial Court (Criminal Division) and the Provincial Court (Family Division) were unified as the Ontario Court (Provincial Division), subsequently renamed the Ontario Court of Justice, and Linden became its first Chief Judge. Linden's appointment was unusual since he was not a judge at the time of his appointment and had not practiced before the courts since 1979. But Scott felt his achievements as a reformer and administrator eminently qualified him for the file. Linden served as Chief Judge until 1999, his tenure involving many administrative and structural changes, rendered more urgent by the unprecedented Askov decision (almost contemporaneous with his appointment), which led to thousands of criminal cases being dismissed because of unreasonable delay.

Linden advocated for administrative independence for the judiciary, a topic which had been studied by various task forces and Royal Commissions. At the time, administration of the court was overseen by the Ministry of the Attorney-General. Linden's efforts in this direction led to negotiation of a memorandum of understanding between the court and the ministry, the first of its kind in Canada. The memorandum transferred financial and administrative authority from the ministry to the court by mutual agreement, ensuring the court's administrative independence and placing it on a more firm financial footing. Linden also served on the board of the National Judicial Institute, an independent, not-for-profit judicial education institution, from 1995 to 1999.

In 1997, the Canadian Institute for the Administration of Justice presented Linden with its Justice Medal. This award is presented biennially "as a mark of distinction and exceptional achievement to a person who, in the opinion of a panel of independent judges, has shown distinctive leadership in the administration of justice in Canada".

=== Chair of Legal Aid Ontario ===
In 1999, Linden was appointed the first chair of the Board of Directors of the reconstituted Legal Aid Ontario (LAO), chosen for his administrative expertise and knowledge of legal aid issues. Implementing recommendations of the McCamus Report of 1997, the first comprehensive analysis of Ontario's legal aid system since its inception, Linden led the transformation of LAO from a committee of the Law Society of Upper Canada into an independent, publicly funded non-profit corporation.

At the conclusion of his term in 2004, the Association of Community Legal Clinics of Ontario presented Linden with the Steven Little Memorial Award for "extraordinary commitment to the community legal clinic system marked by leadership and dedication to helping others". In 2005, LAO established the Sidney B. Linden Award "to honour exceptional individuals who have demonstrated a commitment to helping low-income people, and have given their time and expertise towards ensuring access to justice in Ontario".

=== Commissioner for Ipperwash Inquiry ===
In 2004, Linden was appointed Commissioner for the Ipperwash Inquiry into the Ipperwash Crisis, established to investigate the shooting death of aboriginal protester Dudley George at Ipperwash Provincial Park in 1995. Linden spent two years listening to 139 witnesses, 229 days of testimony and was presented with 23,000 documents. His four-volume Report of the Ipperwash Inquiry was 1,533 pages long. The report was well received by all parties, described by the Law Society of Upper Canada as "a landmark report on Aboriginal, police and government relations." He was also commended for handling a delicate and potentially explosive inquiry with skill and diplomacy, affording due consideration to native culture and sensitivities. Most of the report's 100 recommendations were carried out, including the return of Ipperwash Provincial Park to the first nations and the establishment of a provincial Ministry of Aboriginal Affairs.

The government of Premier Dalton McGuinty maintained that it was following Linden's recommendations in dealing with the subsequent and more chaotic native occupation in Caledonia, Ontario, where police were accused of ignoring unlawful acts by natives and failing to protect residents from harassment and abuse. However, Professor Andrew Sancton of the University of Western Ontario, in his review of police actions in Caledonia in light of the Ipperwash Report, notes that Linden's analysis of police-government relations "effectively repudiated the hands-off position taken by the McGuinty government concerning Caledonia", and that the government's invocation of the Ipperwash Report to defend its "hands-off" approach had no basis in the report itself.

=== Conflict of Interest Commissioner for Ontario ===
From 2007 until 2019, Linden was Ontario's first and only full-time Conflict of Interest Commissioner. The office was established by the Public Service of Ontario Act, 2006, which updated the rules for human resource management and ethics oversight (including disclosure of wrongdoing) for the Ontario Public Service, and was a specialized arms-length executive agency exclusively concerned with public service ethics. However, in May, 2019, the office ceased to exist and its functions were transferred to the Office of the Integrity Commissioner, an independent officer of the legislature, in order to create a single ethics oversight body, a reform which Linden had long advocated.

== Honours ==
- 1976: Queen's Counsel
- 2004: Queen Elizabeth II Golden Jubilee Medal
- 2009: Doctor of law (honoris causa) from The Law Society of Upper Canada
- 2013: Alumni of Influence Award from University College, University of Toronto
- 2014: Queen Elizabeth II Diamond Jubilee Medal
- 2015: Order of Ontario
- 2016: Member of the Order of Canada
