= Anishinaabemowin Language of Kettle and Stony Point =

Central Algonquian language

The spelling of Anishinaabemowin

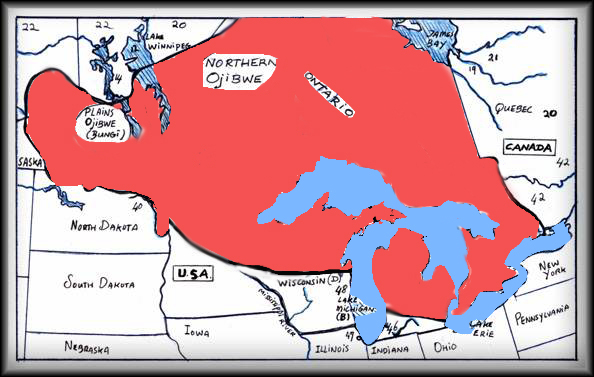
Map of Anishinaabemowin in North America.

The Anishinaabemowin language belongs to the Central Algonquian language family, and is located in Kettle and Stony Point First Nation. This name variation stems from the relation between the name of the language and the name of the people speaking it, as Anishinaabemowin is spoken by the Anishinaabe. It is also a combination of Pottawatomi and Ojibway. There is a population of 936 people living in Kettle and Stony Point, and of those 936, fewer than 10 people are fluent speakers of the language. Kettle and Stony Point is located in Canada, in the province of Ontario and in the municipality of Lambton County.

== Name Variations for the Language ==
This language has a multitude of different names and spelling variations. Once such variation is Potawadami that belongs to the Central Algonquian language family located in Kettle and Stony Point. This spelling and name variation for the language is used by families on the reserve when passing on the teachings of the language to others. Another variation is Potawatomi of the Central Algonquian language family. This spelling variation was discovered on the Ethnologue website and exists as the American spelling for the language. Other name and spelling variation for the language spoken in Kettle and Stony point are Ojibway, Ojibwe or Ojibwa. All these variations refer to the same language, as Anishinaabemowin is believed to be a dialect of Ojibway in the Algonquian language family. The different spelling variations listed above, Ojibwe and Ojibwa are gendered language terms and are spelling variations left behind by French missionaries who tried to document the language. As such Ojibwe is the male gendered term, and Ojibwa is the female gendered term. Another name variation for the language is Chippewa of the Algonquian language family. This variation is often used more in the United States and stems from the name of the people that speak the language Chippewas. The last variation of the language discovered is Ojibwemowin of the Central Algonquian language family. This variation is the languages name in Ojibway.

== Causes of Endangerment ==
There are a multitude of factors that have contributed to the endangered status of the Anishinaabemowin language in Kettle and Stony Point.

=== Conquest ===
This occurs when the conqueror's language replaces the indigenous languages of the conquered. This is the case for the Indigenous languages of Canada, especially the Anishinaabemowin language. When both the French and the English colonies conquered the continent of North America, government policies were erected to deal with the “Indian problem”. These policies were created in the attempt to force assimilation of the Indigenous people into the newly established dominant culture and language. This forced assimilation required that both Indigenous children and adults be only taught and speak the dominant language of English. This drastically impacted the number of fluent speakers of Anishinaabemowin in Kettle and Stony Point.

=== Economic Pressure ===
This occurs because the dominant culture controls the economy and can require the use of the dominant language for employment by subordinate linguistic groups. Indigenous people seeking employment and economic gain in Canada experience this problem everyday and it is a contributing factor to the state of the language use in Kettle and Stony Point. The dominant language in Kettle and Stony Point and surrounding areas is the language of English. Those seeking employment in Kettle and Stony Point are required to have a good understanding of the English language and a fundamental increase in the need to understand and speak English has occurred. The increase of acceptance and use of the English language directly impacted the number of Indigenous people continuing to learn and actively use their own first language.

=== Attitude ===
This factor directly pertains to what people think about their language and with regard to whether or not it is viewed as important to their culture. It is only years later that the true impacts of negative attitudes can be recognized on a language. This is doubly true for the Indigenous languages of Canada. This is in part because many Indigenous people were forced to attend residential school, and so most likely have mixed feelings about their languages. Children were often strongly and sometimes violently discouraged from speaking their language of their heritage. The violent and negative attitudes demonstrated by their teachers towards their languages is something that could have been absorbed and ingrained into the children of these schools. These children would have grown up with a negative and sometimes fearful attitude towards the use of their own heritage languages. These residential school survivors may not have then passed on their own languages to their children, for fear of how their children would be perceived and the treatment they may have gotten for speaking their language. This would then created a drastic decline in the number of fluent speakers in the community, as future children would have been raised to not value their heritage language. Nor would they have any understanding of the cultural significance of the language if their parents chose not to pass on their teachings. This is what happened to the Indigenous people of Kettle and Stony Point, resulting in their heritage language to become endangered.

== Language Vitality ==
This language was assessed using three UNESCO factors to determine the vitality of the language.

=== UNESCO Factor 1 – Intergenerational Language Transmission ===
According the UNESCO grading scale for the language to be considered safe and to receive a grading of 5, the language must be used by all ages and transmitted from one generation to the next. The grading table for this UNESCO factor can be viewed in Table 1. The Anishinaabemowin language of Kettle and Stony point is rated a 2, Severely Endangered. This language was assessed at this rating because transgenerational transmission of the language stopped occurring in the grandparent generation, the youngest fluent speaker is in their fifties. The language is mostly used when conversing with other fluent speakers or when conducting/ participating in ceremonies. The grade of 1 was also considered for this language but after assessment was determined to be inaccurate. The grade of 1 was considered because the language is used mostly by very few speakers, as there are fewer than ten fluent speakers left in Kettle and Stony Point. These fluent speakers are not only of the great-grandparent generation and up, so the language was determined be inadmissible for the rating of 1. Instead, the language was assigned a rating of 2 because the youngest fluent speaker was determined to be in their fifties fitting into the grandparent generation.

Degree of Endangerment	Grade	Speaker Population
Safe	5	The language is used by all ages, from children up.
Unsafe	4	The language is used by some children in all domains; it is used by some children in limited domains.
Definitively Endangered	3	The language is used mostly by the parental generation and up.
Severely Endangered	2	The language is used mostly by the grandparental generation and up
Critically Endangered	1	The language is used mostly by very few speakers, of great grandparental generation
Extinct	0	There exists no speaker.

=== UNESCO Factor 3: Proportion of Speakers within the Total Population ===
The proportion of speakers within a total population is a more significant indictor of language vitality. The UNESCO grading scale for factor 3: Proportion of Speakers within the Total Population can be found in Table 2. The rating for the Anishinaabemowin language of Kettle and Stony Point in accordance with UNESCO factor 3 is 1, critically endangered. This rating was assessed based on the information provided on both the Kettle Point language website page and the 2016 Kettle Point 44, Indian Reserve Census Profile. There are fewer than ten fluent speakers of Anishinaabemowin in Kettle and Stony Point. This information was confirmed in the 2016 census, where only five out of the 1,011 responses indicated that their first language was an aboriginal language. This indicates that 0.49% of the population in Kettle and Stony Point speak the language. Therefore the language was allocated the rating of 1, critically endangered, because very few people in Kettle and Stony Point speak the language.

Degree of Endangerment	Grade	Proportion of Speakers Within the Total Reference Population
Safe	5	All speak the language
Unsafe	4	Nearly all speak the language
Definitively endangered	3	A majority speak the language
Severely endangered	2	A minority speak the language
Critically endangered	1	Very few speak the language
Extinct	0	None speak the language

=== UNESCO Factor 7: Governmental and Institutional Language Attitudes and Policies, including Official Status & Use ===
This factor reports the attitudes of those outside of the language community towards the relevant language. In accordance in the UNESCO scale for a language to achieve a rating of 5, equal support, the region or nation of the language would need to allow for the use of all languages in public domains. The grading scale for the seventh UNESCO factor can be located in Table 3. In accordance with this grading scale, the language of Anishinaabemowin in Kettle and Stony Point has been assessed with the rating of 4, differentiated support. This rating was determined based on the government policies in place to protect Indigenous languages in Canada. On June 21, 2019, The Indigenous Languages Act was passed and received Royal Assent. This bill protects indigenous people's rights to use, reclaim, revitalize, maintain and strength indigenous languages. Before this bill was passed, indigenous languages were not protected in Canada and were strongly discouraged from use. This means that while the Anishinaabemowin language is now protected by government policies, the use of the language is not considered prestigious by many. Therefore, the Anishinaabemowin language of Kettle and Stony Point was scored a 4, as the language is protected by government policies, even though the use of the language is not prestigious, and the dominant language prevails in the public domain.

Degree of Support	Grade	Official Attitudes toward Language
Equal Support	5	All languages are protected
Differentiated Support	4	Minority languages are protected primarily as the language of the private domains. The use of the language is prestigious
Passive assimilation	3	No explicit policy exists for minority languages; the dominant language prevails in the public domain.
Active assimilation	2	Government encourages assimilation to the dominant language. There is no protection for minority languages.
Forced assimilation	1	The dominant language is the sole official language, while non-dominant languages are neither recognized nor protected.
Prohibition	0	Minority languages are prohibited.

=== Overall Assessment ===
The overall assessment for the vitality of the Anishinaabemowin language at Kettle and Stony Point is endangered. This status was determined by weighing the outcomes of the factor assessments that were conducted. When analyzing the results of these assessments more weight was placed on the results of the Factor 7 valuation. This is because government policies and forced language assimilation were the main causes and consequences of endangerment for the Anishinaabemowin language of Kettle and Stony Point. With the Royal Assent of the Indigenous Language Act, indigenous languages are now being protected. Thus, allowing for language revitalizations to occur, as is the case at Kettle and Stony Point. While Factor 7 was directly related to a critical consequence of endangerment, it was not the only critical factor assessed. Factor 3 is also a critical factor, as the proportion of speakers in a population has a great importance for the continuation of a language. With fewer than ten fluent speakers and only 0.49% of the population speaking the language, the Anishinaabemowin Language of Kettle and Stony Point is likely to go dormant in the next generation or two. The revitalization projects should ensure the language continuation with the establishment of more speakers. Therefore, the vitality status of the Anishinaabemowin Language of Kettle and Stony Point is endangered. With the possibility of an argument being made for critically endangered status, with the chance of dormancy in the next generation if revitalization does not work.

== Language Revitalization ==
Kettle and Stony Point First Nation Reserve has both short-term and long-term plans for language revitalization of Anishinaabemowin.

=== Short-term Revitalization Programs ===
The short-term plan or “Quick Wins” are to be carried out over a short time and are cost effective. These programs are the Unity Gathering and Storytelling. The Unity Gathering is an annual event that is intended to bring the people of the community together to share, teach and celebrate their culture. The Storytelling program is composed of events that are held in the hopes of passing on the traditions of Oral History and sharing. It also provides the opportunity for those in attendance to share their stories and hear the language. These two different programs are categorized as community-based programs by Lenore Grenoble and Lindsay Whaley because the language will be shared, taught and incorporated within the culture in a community setting.

=== Long-term Revitalization Programs ===
There are several long-term language revitalization plans for Anishinaabemowin in place at Kettle and Stony Point First Nations.

==== Chippewas of Kettle and Stony Point Head Start Day Care ====
The first long-term plan established was the Chippewas of Kettle and Stony Point Head Start Day Care. The program statement for the daycare states that it was “committed to moving forward in reclaiming of the Ojibway language and providing optimal growth in all areas of the developmental stages”. This ideology is achieved through the embracement of the “Wheel of Learning” method, where Culture/Language is a main component. The program is not a total immersion program. Instead the children are encouraged to communicate in however they feel most comfortable, whether that be non-verbal or verbal in both English or Anishinaabemowin Both English and Anishinaabemowin are sproken by the children and the workers of the daycare. The children are also instructed in the Anishinaabemowin language by the workers. Therefore, the Head Start Day Care Program is classified as Grenoble and Whaley's partial-immersion or bilingual program.

==== Language Classes ====
The second long-term Anishinaabemowin language revitalization program at Kettle and Stony Point is language classes. There are language classes that are taught at the Kettle and Stony Point elementary school Hillside. These classes are taught to children attending the school as a second language. These classes are categorized as Grenoble and Whaley's “Foreign” Language program because they can be compared to studying a major European language in a North American classroom.

There are also language classes that are held at the Four Winds and the Cultural Resource Centre. These classes are not advertised online or on paper but instead through word of mouth. The structure of these classes are normally one teacher/fluent speaker and a maximum of eight students/learners. This style of teaching and learning can be classified as the master-apprentice program by Grenoble and Whaley. This is because the community has few fluent speakers and those speakers are paired with eager community members who are wanting to learn. These lessons are unstructured and taught without expert supervision. The fluent speakers have been holding these lessons for some years now, the lessons are getting more structured as the speakers gain more experience teaching.

=== Online Language Revitalization Programs ===
There are several online revitalization programs available for Anishinaabemowin. These programs can be found on a variety of websites and vary in both format and content. There is an interactive dictionary that can be located on kspcommunityculture.ca/language.html. This interactive dictionary provides the word in Anishinaabemowin and then the English translation and description follow. There is also an interactive play button that allows for the learner to hear how the word is pronounced in the language.

There is an online pilot program that is designed for daily language learning and practice called Anishinaabemowin Everyday. This pilot program is composed of online lessons that take roughly 15 minutes each to complete. The teaching methods utilized by this program are podcasts, flashcards, multiple choice, fill-in-the-blank, drag-and-drop, and quizzes. The podcasts that are hosted by fluent speakers that discuss the language and pronounce phrases and words. The flashcards that are available contain phrases and words in the language to aid in studying. The options of multiple choice, fill-in-the-blank, drag-and-drop and quizzes help the learner to test their knowledge and skills in the language. These two examples of some of the online resources available highlight Andras Knori's argument of the importance of the web to language revitalization. These programs are geared towards aiding “digital natives” in the learning of their language, as young people have never known a world without digital media learning.
