= Marjorie Anthony Linden =

Canadian broadcaster and media executive (1935 – 2013)

- Born: Marjorie Anthony; October 10, 1935; Mill Village, Nova Scotia
- Died: April 1, 2013 (aged 77); Malibu, California
- Other names: Marge Anthony
- Occupations: broadcaster, media executive
- Spouse: Allen Linden (m. 1984; d. 2013)

Marjorie Anthony Linden (October 10, 1935 – April 1, 2013) was a Canadian broadcaster and media executive. She achieved multiple "firsts" for women in broadcasting, including being the first all-night woman disc jockey in Montreal, the first woman vice-president in the Canadian television industry, and the first female president of the Broadcast Executive Society.

Born in Mill Village, Nova Scotia, she was one of eight children of Barbara, who died when Marjorie was three years old, and Roy Anthony, a plumber. She was raised by an elder sister and various housekeepers. An entertainer from an early age, she sang and tap-danced on a local radio station at age thirteen. Although interested in studying to become a nurse, she took a job as a script assistant, commentator, and singer at CBC-TV in Halifax. She moved to Montreal at age 24, and was a nightclub singer at the Ritz Carlton Hotel. Her sound was similar to that of Doris Day, and she recorded the album Marge Anthony Sings. She then worked at CKGM as a commercial writer, but soon became their all-night disc jockey. Later, she returned to television to be a commentator and a weather reporter at CFCF-TV.

She moved to the United States to further her career, and was a producer at the NBC affiliate in Houston. Her works there included Furnishings of the White House, and A Texan Visits the White House featuring Lady Bird Johnson. She moved to work in Hollywood in the 1960s, and became vice-president, artist relations, for the company handling the Smothers Brothers. Then she worked in New York at CBS Records, with such artists as Kenny Rogers, Barry Manilow, and Nana Mouskouri. She also oversaw a world tour and two television specials for Neil Diamond. She returned to work for the Smothers Brothers in California, this time as their personal manager.

In 1978 she returned to Canada, in various jobs at CTV including publicity and public relations for the Calgary Olympics. She served as vice-president of network relations for CTV.

She had two brief marriages when she was young, and then in 1984 married Allen Linden, an Ontario judge. She had three stepdaughters from that relationship, and no biological children of her own. Her health deteriorated due to systemic lupus erythematosus and other illnesses, and she died in 2013 in Malibu, California at age 77.
