= Mike Harris =

22nd Premier of Ontario (born 1945)

The Honourable Mike Harris OOnt ECO
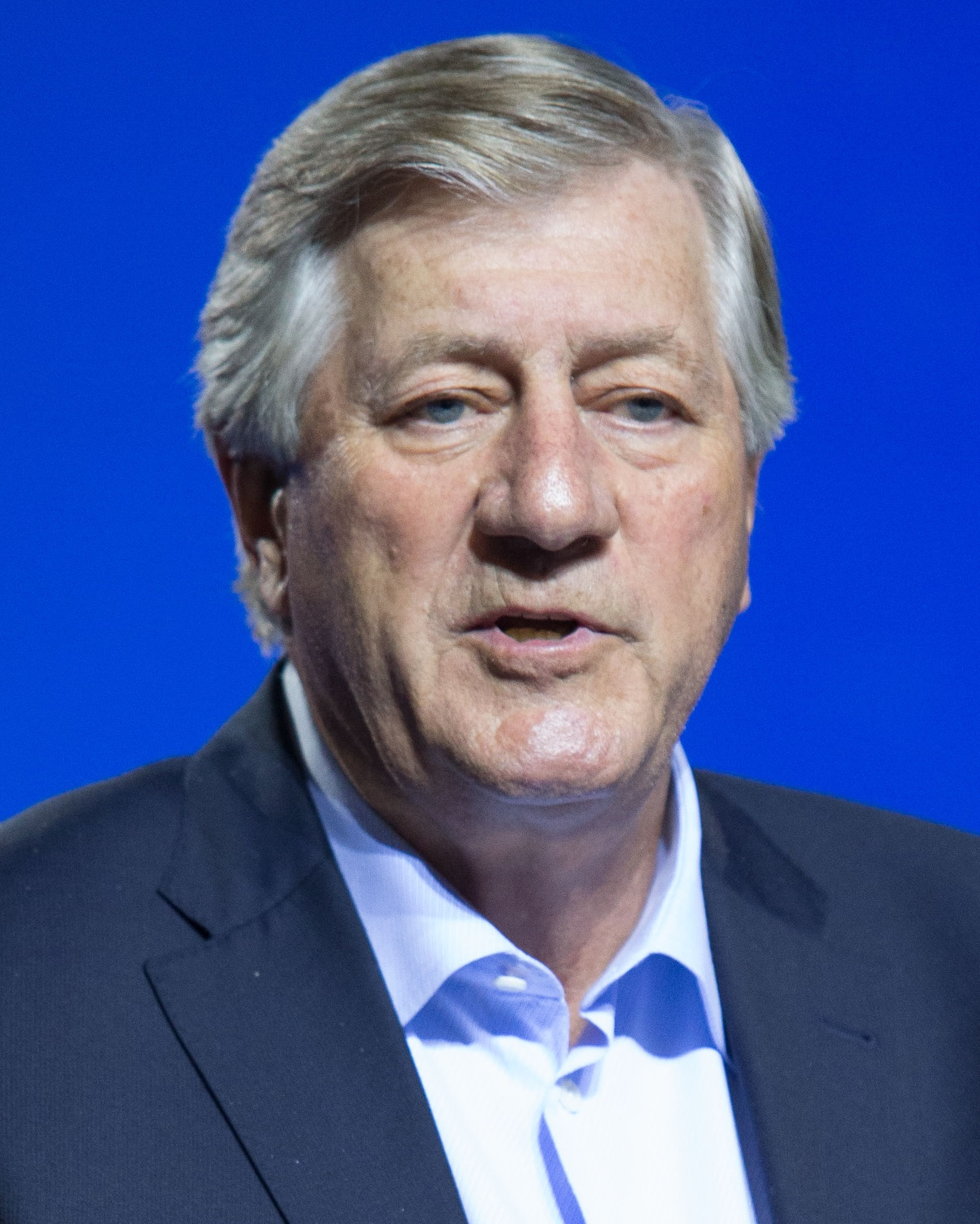
- Harris in 2014

22nd Premier of Ontario
- In office June 26, 1995 – April 14, 2002
- Monarch: Elizabeth II
- Lieutenant Governor: Hal Jackman; Hilary Weston; James Bartleman
- Deputy: Ernie Eves; Jim Flaherty
- Preceded by: Bob Rae
- Succeeded by: Ernie Eves

Leader of the Progressive Conservative Party of Ontario
- In office May 12, 1990 – March 23, 2002
- Preceded by: Andy Brandt (interim)
- Succeeded by: Ernie Eves

Member of the Legislative Assembly of Ontario for Nipissing
- In office March 19, 1981 – April 14, 2002
- Preceded by: Mike Bolan
- Succeeded by: Al McDonald

Personal details
- Born: Michael Deane Harris; January 23, 1945 (age 81) Toronto, Ontario, Canada
- Party: Progressive Conservative
- Spouse(s): Mary Alyce Coward (m. 1967, div.), Janet Harrison (m. 1974, div.), Laura Maguire (m. 2005)
- Relations: 2, including Mike Harris Jr.

Michael Deane Harris OOnt ECO (born January 23, 1945) is a retired Canadian politician who served as the 22nd premier of Ontario from 1995 to 2002 and leader of the Progressive Conservative Party of Ontario from 1990 to 2002. Taking the PC Party to the right, he is noted for the "Common Sense Revolution", his government's program of fiscally conservative policies.

Born in Toronto, Harris grew up in North Bay and worked as a ski instructor and schoolteacher before becoming a school board trustee in 1974. In 1981, he became a member of Provincial Parliament (MPP) for the riding of Nipissing. He became leader of the Progressive Conservative Party in the 1990 leadership election. That same year, a provincial election was called in which Harris led the PCs to a modest boost in support, though they still remained in third place. However, five years later, he led the PCs to a strong majority government in the 1995 provincial election. He led the party to a second majority in 1999.

As party leader and premier, Harris shifted the historically centrist PC Party to the right by embracing the Common Sense Revolution, which emphasized lower taxes, deficit reduction, cuts to public spending, and privatization. His government reduced personal income taxes by 30 percent, privatized Highway 407, and privatized provincial water testing which was viewed as controversial especially after the Walkerton E. coli outbreak. He oversaw cuts to healthcare, infrastructure, and education spending, the last of which led to the 1997 Ontario teachers' strike, the largest teachers' strike in Ontario history. In 1999, Harris' government balanced the budget. In administrative policy, his government reduced the number of MPPs from 130 to 103 between 1995 and 1999, and oversaw the Amalgamation of Toronto. In his final years in office, his government introduced a tax credit for parents who send their children to private schools.

In 2002, Harris retired as premier and PC leader, and was succeeded by Ernie Eves in both capacities. After leaving office, Harris went into the private sector and became a fellow at the Fraser Institute, a conservative think tank.

== Background ==
Harris was born in Toronto, Ontario, the son of Hope Gooding (born Robinson) and Sidney Deane Harris. He grew up in North Bay, where his father operated the Wasi Falls Resort fishing camp. Harris attended Waterloo Lutheran University (now Wilfrid Laurier University) but left after a year.

At the age of 21, following his father's purchase of a ski hill, Harris moved for two years to Sainte-Adèle, Quebec, where he became a ski instructor. After the end of his first marriage, he enrolled at Laurentian University and North Bay Teacher's College where he received his teaching certificate. He was employed as an elementary school teacher at W. J. Fricker Public School in North Bay where he taught grade seven and eight mathematics for several years in a new open-concept class of 120 students. He continued in his previous occupation as a ski-instructor at Nipissing Ridge on weekends as well as working at his father's fishing camp during the summer season. He eventually left the teaching profession as the success of the ski resort escalated. After his father sold his ski-hill operation, Harris was hired to manage North Bay's Pinewood Golf Club.

== Early political career ==
Harris was elected to public office as a school board trustee in 1974. He entered provincial politics in the 1981 election, and defeated Mike Bolan, the incumbent Liberal MPP in Nipissing. Harris later suggested that he was motivated to enter politics by an opposition to the policies of Prime Minister Pierre Trudeau.

Harris sat as a backbencher in Bill Davis's PC government from 1981 to 1985. He supported Frank Miller's successful bid to succeed Davis as party leader in 1985 and took the role of rival candidate Dennis Timbrell to prepare Miller for the party's all-candidate debates. Miller was sworn in as premier of Ontario on February 8, 1985, and appointed Harris as minister of natural resources.

The Tories were reduced to a minority government in the 1985 provincial election, although Harris was personally re-elected without difficulty. He kept the natural resources portfolio after the election, and was also named minister of energy on May 17, 1985. The Miller government was soon defeated on a motion of no confidence by David Peterson's Liberals and Bob Rae's New Democratic Party (NDP).

An agreement between the Liberals and the NDP allowed a Liberal minority government to govern for two years in exchange for the implementation of certain NDP policies. This decision consigned the Tories to opposition for the first time in 42 years. Miller resigned and was replaced by Larry Grossman, who led the party to a disastrous showing in the 1987 election and announced his resignation shortly thereafter. Harris was again re-elected in Nipissing without difficulty.

== Leadership (1990) ==
Grossman, who had lost his legislative seat, remained the leader of the party until 1990, while Sarnia MPP Andy Brandt served as "interim leader" in the legislature. Harris was chosen as PC house leader, and had become the party's dominant voice in the legislature by 1989. Harris entered the 1990 leadership race, and defeated Dianne Cunningham in a province-wide vote to replace Grossman as the party's official leader.

The 1990 provincial election was called soon after Harris became party leader. With help from past leader Larry Grossman, Harris managed to rally his party's core supporters with pledges of tax cuts and spending reductions. Due to his teaching background, Harris was personally endorsed by several local members of the Ontario Secondary School Teachers' Federation (OSSTF). The election was won by Bob Rae's NDP. The Conservatives increased their seat total from 17 to 20 out of 130. Despite some early concerns, Harris was again able to retain his own seat.

== 1995 election ==
On May 3, 1994, Harris unveiled his "Common Sense Revolution" platform. It called for significant spending and tax cuts, as well as elimination of the province's record $11 billion deficit.

By the 1995 election, the governing New Democratic Party and incumbent Premier Bob Rae had become unpopular with the electorate, partly due to the state of the Ontario economy and its record debt and deficit amidst a Canada-wide recession. Lyn McLeod's Liberals were leading in pre-election polls and were expected to benefit from the swing in support away from the NDP, but they began losing support due to several controversial policy reversals and what was generally regarded as an uninspiring campaign. The turning point in the election is often considered to be Harris's performance in the televised leaders' debate. Harris used his camera time to speak directly to the camera to convey his party's Common Sense Revolution platform. The Rae government had previously lost much of its base in organized labour, due in part to the unpopularity of its "Social Contract" legislation in 1993 (which Harris, after some initial vacillations, eventually voted against). Harris's opposition to Rae's affirmative action measures helped him to capture some unionized-worker support during the election, particularly among male workers.

Although there were regional variations, many union voters shifted from the NDP to the PCs in 1995 (instead of to the Liberals as expected pre-campaign), enabling the PCs to win a number of new ridings, such as Cambridge and Oshawa, which had long supported the NDP. In addition roughly half of the PCs seats came from the suburban belt surrounding Metro Toronto, often called the '905' for its telephone area code. The PCs' growth from 20 to 82 seats in the 130 seat legislature vaulted them from third place to a large majority government.

== Premier of Ontario (1995–2002) ==
=== First term (1995–1999) ===
==== Common Sense Revolution ====
Upon election, the Harris government immediately began to implement a far-reaching reform agenda to cut the large provincial deficit accumulated under the previous Rae government. One of its first major policy decisions in 1995 was to cut social assistance rates by 21.6%. The government argued that too many people were taking advantage of the program, and that it acted as a disincentive for seeking employment. The government also introduced "Ontario Works", frequently referred to as "workfare", a program that required able-bodied welfare recipients to participate in either training or job placements.

Provincial income taxes were cut by 30% to pre-1990 levels. In addition, a new Fair Share Health Levy was established and charged to high-income earners to help pay for mounting health care costs.

Shortly after assuming office, the Harris government announced that several hundred nurses would be laid off to cut costs in the health sector. The government also implemented a series of hospital closures and amalgamations on the recommendations of a Health Services Restructuring Commission. Harris compared the laid off hospital workers to the people who lost their jobs after the hula hoop fad died down in the early 1960s, commenting "Just as Hula-Hoops went out and those workers had to have a factory and a company that would manufacture something else that's in, it's the same in government, and you know, governments have put off these decisions for so many years that restructuring sometimes is painful".

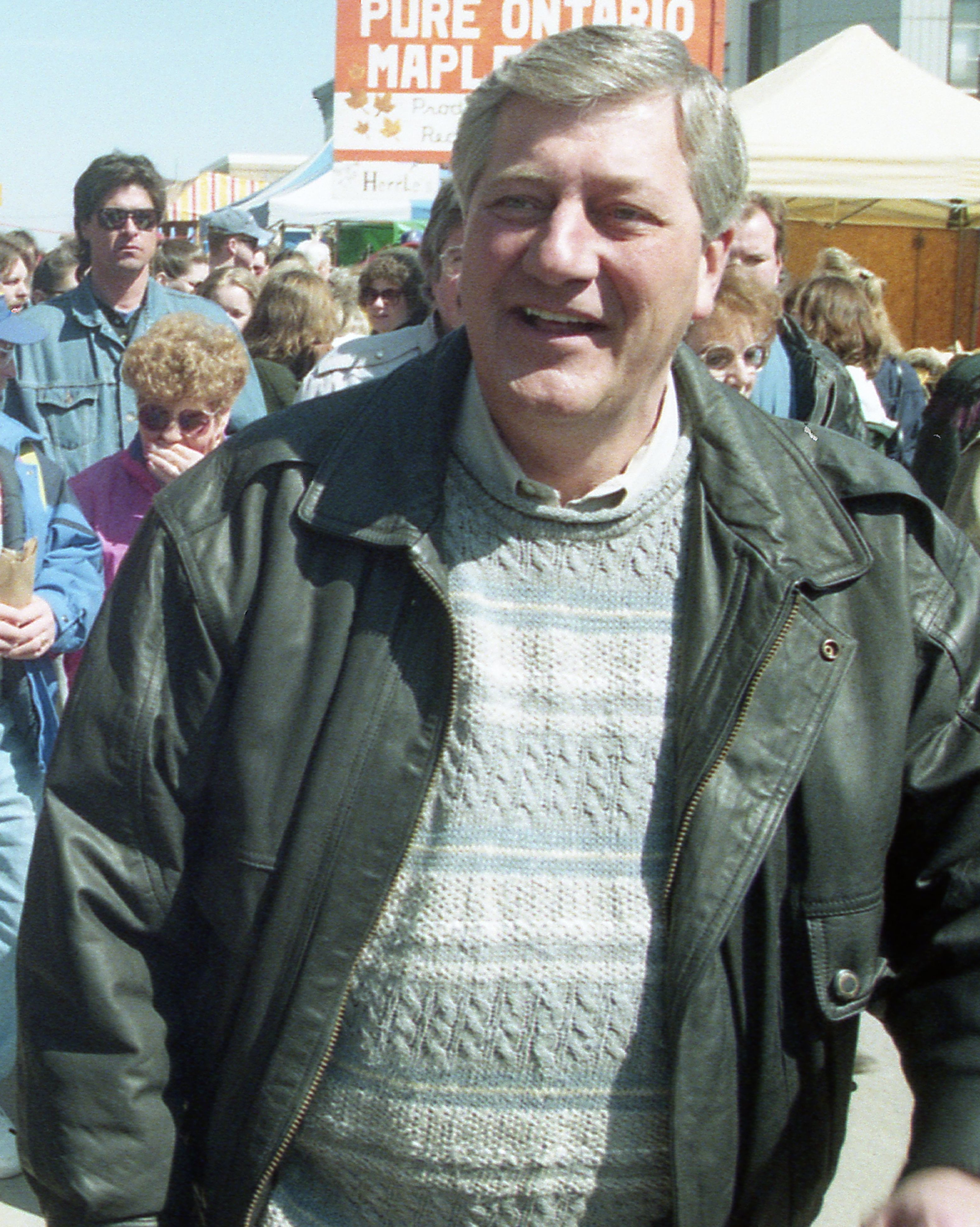
Premier Harris at a pancake festival, 1996

The Harris government cut funding of major urban infrastructure projects upon assuming office. Though construction had already begun on the Eglinton West subway in Toronto, a proposed rapid transit line to ultimately link the main north–south subway line of the city with the suburbs and airport, funding was cancelled shortly after Harris's election. Harris also cancelled the province-wide funding arrangement covering 50% of municipal transit costs, a move brought in by PC Premier Bill Davis.

Harris's government also cut health spending to counter the $30 billion cut in transfer payments from the Liberal federal government. It also introduced Telehealth Ontario, a 24-hour toll-free telephone help line with live connection to registered nurses. Harris also announced funding vehicles such as the Ontario R&D Challenge Fund, the Ontario Innovation Trust and the Premier's Research Excellence Awards.

One part of the Common Sense Revolution was to sell off various government-owned enterprises, the largest of which were to be Ontario Hydro and the Liquor Control Board of Ontario. Neither was actually sold off, but Ontario Hydro was split into five successor companies (the two largest being Ontario Power Generation and Hydro One, representing generation and distribution of power respectively) with the plan of eventually selling them off. Public opposition to the sale of these money-making government enterprises postponed the government's plans. In 1999, Highway 407 was leased to a private consortium.

Harris reduced the number of MPPs from 130 to 103 by redrawing riding boundaries to correspond to federal electoral districts.

The Harris government passed Bill 26, the Savings and Restructuring Act, which undertook an extensive program of municipal mergers between 1996 and 2002. The province had 815 municipalities in 1996; by 2002, this had been reduced to 447. In the largest and most widely covered of these moves, the individual cities that made up Metro Toronto were merged into a single city (called the "megacity" by the media and citizens); the amalgamation was not part of their pre-election policy platform. The Conservatives argued that the move would eliminate duplication of services and increase efficiency. Opposition parties were strongly opposed to the move; the NDP took the unusual step of attempting to filibuster against the bill by reading out the name of every street in Toronto. In order to further reduce provincial commitments, financial responsibility for provincial income assistance programs was transferred or "downloaded" to municipalities, increasing the burden on municipal tax bases. The list of municipalities in Ontario was updated by the Municipal Act, 2001, which is the legislation that enables incorporation and stipulates governance of Ontario's municipalities, excluding the City of Toronto, which is now subject to the City of Toronto Act, 2006. The Municipal Act, 2001 provides lower and single-tier municipalities with the authority to incorporate as cities, towns, villages, townships, or generically as municipalities.

The Harris government also passed the Public Sector Salary Disclosure Act in 1996, publishing so-called Sunshine lists annually to disclose wages and benefits of public employees earning over $100,000 per year, to increase accountability.

==== Education ====
The Harris government introduced several education reforms. The fifth year of high school in Ontario, (known as the OAC year), was eliminated. This created a double graduating class in 2003 (known as the "double cohort"). Harris introduced Bill 160, (the Education Quality Improvement Act), which mandated a standardized curriculum and province-wide testing for students. This included Grade 3 and 6 EQAO (numeracy and literacy) testing, as well as a Grade 10 Literacy test. Harris introduced a requirement for High School students to complete a mandatory 40 hours of volunteering in community service in order to graduate.

In 1999, it introduced a policy of "teacher testing", requiring teachers to take examinations on a regular basis. Principals and vice-principals were removed from the [OTF].

==== 1995 referendum on the separation of Quebec ====
Harris, along with Stephen Harper, was appointed negotiator by Prime Minister Jean Chrétien to face Quebec negotiators nominated by the separatist leaders of Quebec: Lucien Bouchard and Mario Dumont. At the time of the referendum campaign, Harris affirmed that "a separate Quebec would be a foreign country. Final point."

==== Ipperwash crisis ====
Shortly after being sworn in, Harris faced his first crisis as premier. Protesters fighting land claim issues took over a provincial park 200 kilometres west of Toronto. During a confrontation with the demonstrators, Ontario Provincial Police acting Sergeant Kenneth Deane fired on First Nations demonstrators who had occupied the park, killing a protester named Dudley George. Members of the Stoney Point Ojibway band occupied Ipperwash Provincial Park outside of Grand Bend, protesting a protracted land claims process. The Ipperwash Inquiry would later be called by the Liberal government of Dalton McGuinty, due to recalcitrance on Harris's part.

=== Second term (1999–2002) ===
In 1999, the Harris government was re-elected for a second term with a majority government, helped largely by its political base in the suburban areas around Toronto.

The Harris government balanced the provincial budget in 1999. Harris supporters pointed to the fact that government revenues rose from $48 billion in 1995 to $64 billion by 2001, when the budget was balanced.

In 1999 Harris also announced a program called Ontario's Living Legacy. The initiative added 378 new parks and protected areas, bringing the total in Ontario to 650 and increasing Ontario's protected areas to more than 95,000 square kilometres (37,000 sq mi).

Controversy arose in 2000 when the town water supply of Walkerton became infected by E. coli. Seven people died and hundreds became ill. Provincial water testing had been privatized in October 1996 by Harris's first government. It was later discovered the local official responsible for water quality, Stan Koebel, had lied, falsified records, failed to test water quality regularly, and when the outbreak occurred had failed to promptly notify the local medical officer of health. In late 2004, Koebel pleaded guilty to a minor charge in relation to the offence and was sentenced to one year in jail.

The Walkerton tragedy had serious ramifications for Harris's government. Harris blamed the previous NDP government for loosening water standards. Harris called a public inquiry, headed by Justice Dennis O'Connor, which later noted that in addition to Stan Koebel's failure to properly monitor and treat the water supply, deregulation of water quality testing and cuts to the Ministry of the Environment were contributing factors. The inquest into the tragedy found that the government cuts to inspection services and their privatization had created a situation in which future water safety could not be guaranteed. The Ontario government was also blamed for not regulating water quality and not enforcing the guidelines that had been in place.

An uprising developed at Queen's Park, the site of the Ontario Legislature, on June 15, 2000. The Ontario Coalition Against Poverty and other activists, including MPP of Toronto Centre, George Smitherman, protested the Harris ministry policies that were resulting in the transfer of wealth to the wealthy from everyone else. Some of the protesters lobbed molotov cocktails, bricks, and bottles.

Harris's government reduced Ontario welfare rolls by 500,000 people; critics contend these cuts led to a rise in homelessness and poverty. Supporters argued that high welfare rates had created disincentives to find entry-level jobs, and that poverty levels remained relatively unchanged between 1995 and 2005. Employment rates increased significantly during the late 1990s. The government rewrote labour laws to require secret ballot votes before workplaces could unionize. The previous NDP government's law outlawing the hiring of replacement workers during strikes was repealed.

Other changes brought in by the Harris government include standardized math and literacy student tests, known as EQAO. EQAO testing is conducted in Grade 3 and 6 (for math and literacy) and 9 (for math only). Teachers are not allowed to preview the tests ahead of time, eliminating the risk of 'teaching to the test'. School principals are required to discuss EQAO results during staff meetings, and plan their focus accordingly. In Grade 10, high school students are required to pass a literacy test in order to graduate. A new provincial funding formula for school boards stripped the local boards of their taxation powers.

In 2001, the Harris government introduced a plan to give a tax credit for parents who send their children to private and denominational schools (despite having campaigned against such an initiative in 1999). Supporters claimed it was fair given the public funding of Catholic schools, while opponents were concerned about a potential diversion of resources and students from the public system. Harris also broke with tradition to place backbench MPPs on Cabinet committees.

Harris resigned as premier and MPP on April 14, 2002 and was succeeded as PC leader and premier by his long-time friend and minister of finance, Ernie Eves.

== After politics (2002–present) ==
Soon after leaving office, Harris joined the Toronto law firm Goodmans LLP, where he served as an advisor until 2010.

Later in 2002, Harris also joined the Fraser Institute, a right-of-centre libertarian think tank, as a senior fellow. It was there that he became involved with the ideals of Preston Manning, becoming a major influence in federal politics as well as Alberta. Harris served on the board of directors of the Manning Centre.

In January 2003, Harris was named to the board of directors of Magna International. More recently in 2011, he was criticized for accepting re-election to the board of Magna despite receiving only 38% of shareholder support. This was possible since shareholder votes in Canada are either counted as "for" a director or else considered as "withheld", meaning that they are not counted. In 2012, Harris indicated that he would step down from the board of directors at Magna International after completing a process to collapse the company's dual-class share structure that he helped begin in 2010.

He was later involved in a minor controversy, yelling and repeatedly swearing at a party official who asked him for his identification as he voted in the 2004 Ontario Progressive Conservative Party leadership election.

In late May 2010, Nipissing University confirmed that Harris would receive an honorary doctorate. In response, the Ontario Teachers' Federation threatened to discourage, or even prevent, their members from acting as associate teachers for students in Nipissing University's Bachelor of Education program, which requires students to complete 12 weeks of practice teaching in a classroom. Nipissing University's $25 million Harris Learning Library, which opened in 2011, is named after the former premier.

In 2012, Harris started a local Nurse Next Door Home Care franchise in Toronto with wife Laura. In May 2014, Harris co-led an independent Canadian mission to observe the Ukrainian presidential election.

In the 2018 Ontario general election, his son Mike Harris Jr. was elected as MPP for Kitchener-Conestoga, also a member of the Progressive Conservative Party. From 2003 to 2022, Harris served as the Chair of the Board for Chartwell Retirement Residences. During the COVID-19 pandemic in Canada, Chartwell and other for-profit facilities had "far worse COVID-19 outcomes than public facilities" after paying hundreds of millions to shareholders over the last decade. Since joining the board, Mike Harris has been compensated roughly $3.5-million for his services.

=== Ipperwash Inquest (2005–2007) ===
In the inquiry following the Ipperwash Crisis, it was determined that while some protesters were carrying rocks, sticks and baseball bats, none were carrying firearms. The confrontation that led to the shooting began when police clashed with a protester armed with a steel pipe. The government and the OPP maintained that there was no political involvement in the shooting, but inside the Legislature where parliamentary privilege outweighs any civil claims, several opposition politicians suggested that the attack may have been ordered by the premier's office, and called for an independent judicial inquiry. In a court case that went to the Supreme Court of Canada, Deane maintained that he was not under orders to shoot and was convicted of criminal negligence causing death. An inquiry, headed by commissioner Justice Sidney Linden, was called after the government of Dalton McGuinty was elected in 2003.

On November 28, 2005, former-attorney general Charles Harnick testified before the Ipperwash Inquiry that Harris had shouted "I want the fucking Indians out of the park" at a meeting with Ontario Provincial Police officer Ron Fox, hours before the shooting occurred (Canadian Press, 28 November 2005). Other witnesses have disputed this account, and Harris himself denied it in his testimony on 14 February 2006 at the inquiry.

According to the Ontario Court of Justice history project, the Ipperwash Inquiry "found that the OPP, the provincial government led by Premier Mike Harris, and the federal government all bore responsibility for the events that led to George's death. The report also called on the federal government to issue a public apology and return Camp Ipperwash – along with compensation – to the Kettle and Stoney Point First Nation." In Volume 1 of the report it was noted that, Premier Harris's "comments" and "generally the speed at which he wished to end the occupation of Ipperwash Park, created an atmosphere that unduly narrowed the scope of the government's response to the Aboriginal occupation."

The Premier's determination to seek a quick resolution closed off many options endorsed by civil servants in the Ontario government, including process negotiations, the appointment of mediators, and opening up communication with the First Nations people. His narrow approach to the occupation did not enable the situation to stabilize at the park.

In spite of his denials, the inquiry found that Harris did say "I want the fucking Indians out of the park." This finding was based on not being able to find an existing animosity from Harnick towards Harris and the fact that Harnick was reversing previous statements that he had made in the legislature which would not be of any benefit to himself.

=== Federal politics speculation ===
During his time as premier, Harris was frequently cited as someone who could "unite the right" in Canada, and lead a merged party of federal Progressive Conservatives and Reform/Canadian Alliance supporters. He made serious steps toward a career in federal politics after stepping down as Premier, weighing in on issues such as the 2003 invasion of Iraq (which he supported) and the value of the Canadian dollar (which he wanted to see increase in relation to the American dollar).

In late 2003, he made a speech in Halifax which many believed was the unofficial launch of a campaign to lead the new Conservative Party of Canada. In the end, Harris decided to stand aside. He later endorsed former Magna International president and CEO Belinda Stronach in the 2004 leadership election. Harris was reportedly active in helping Stronach fundraise for her campaign.

After the federal Conservatives' loss in the 2021 Canadian federal election, Harris urged the party to "unite behind" the leader, Erin O'Toole, through a column of his in the newspaper, Toronto Sun.

== Distinctions ==
- Honorary doctorate, Nipissing University (2010)
- Member of the Order of Ontario (2020)

== See also ==
- Common Sense Revolution
- Progressive Conservative Party of Ontario
- Ipperwash Crisis
- Walkerton tragedy
- Life Under Mike – A documentary about the overall effects of the Common Sense Revolution produced by filmmaker James Motluk and released in September, 2000

Miller ministry, Province of Ontario (1985)
Cabinet posts (2)
Predecessor	Office	Successor
George Ashe	Minister of Energy; 1985 (May–June)	Vince Kerrio
Alan Pope	Minister of Natural Resources; 1985 (February–June)	Vince Kerrio
