= CKTI-FM =

Coordinates: 43°10′38″N 81°59′19″W

- Kettle Point, Ontario; Canada
- Frequency: 107.7 MHz
- Branding: The Eagle

Programming
- Format: First Nations, Community radio, Alternative Country

Ownership
- Owner: Points Eagle Radio

History
- First air date: 2004

Technical information
- Class: A
- ERP: 420 watts
- HAAT: 33.1 metres (109 ft)

Links
- Website: eaglecountry.ca

CKTI-FM is a First Nations community radio station in Canada, playing a mixture of country and classic rock broadcasting at 107.7 FM in Kettle Point, Ontario. The station has an alternative country style to its music. The station was licensed in 2003 and began broadcasting in 2004 and is owned by Points Eagle Radio Inc.

On August 7, 2007, the station was authorized to add a rebroadcaster (CKCI-FM) in Sarnia on 103.3 FM. CKCI is off the air as of May 2017, with its license revoked March 19, 2019.
