= Allen Linden =

Justice of the Federal Court of Appeal and distinguished tort law professor

The Honourable Allen M. Linden OC

Judge of the Canadian Federal Court of Appeal
- In office July 5, 1990 – October 7, 2009

Personal details
- Born: October 7, 1934 Toronto, Ontario
- Died: 23 August 2017 (aged 82) Toronto, Ontario
- Spouse(s): Marjorie Anthony Linden (m. 1984; d. 2013), Joanna Maxwell Linden (m. 2015; d. 2017)
- Relations: Sidney B. Linden, Sandra Linden

Allen Martin Linden, OC, (October 7, 1934 – August 23, 2017) was a Justice of the Federal Court of Appeal and distinguished tort law professor. He was named an Officer of the Order of Canada in 2015.

Linden attained a B.A from the University of Toronto, a L.L.B from Osgoode Hall Law School and a J.S.D from University of California at Berkeley. He was called to the Bar in Ontario in 1960.

Linden was an associate at Levinter, Grossberg, Dryden & Co., until he left to teach at Osgoode Hall Law School from 1961 to 1978. In 1978, he was appointed to the Superior Court of Ontario. He became the president of the Law Reform Commission of Canada from 1983 to 1990. In 1990, he was appointed to the Federal Court of Appeal.

Linden taught in the U.S., Australia and the U.K. and wrote several books and scores of articles about torts. In 1965, he authored a statistical study on Compensation for Auto Accidents which led the Province of Ontario to adopt a no-fault auto insurance plan in 1969. Justice Linden also did a statistical study on compensation for victims of crime (1968) which influenced the Ontario government to enact a public scheme to furnish compensation to victims of violent crime. Prior to his elevation to the Bench, he served as a consultant in the litigation of Canadian thalidomide children seeking compensation from the drug company that produced the drug. Justice Linden acted as Executive Director of the Canadian Institute on the Administration of Justice from 1974 to 1978.

Unable to give up on torts teaching, he continued to teach part-time at the University of Ottawa and at Pepperdine University, School of Law in California. He produced updated editions of his publications, including a 14th edition of his casebook on Canadian tort law.

Having studied under William Lloyd Prosser, a prominent torts scholar in the United States, Allen Linden achieved similar recognition in Canada.

He was married to media executive Marjorie Anthony Linden from 1984 until her death in 2013. In July 2015 he married Joanna Maxwell.

Linden's brother, Sidney B. Linden, is also a former Ontario judge. Linden has three daughters, Wendy Linden who is a practising lawyer, Lisa Linden who is a lawyer by training, and Robyn Linden who is also a lawyer by training. He has three sons-in-law, Stephen Firestone who is a Superior Court Judge, Andrew Wiseman who is a practicing lawyer, and David Weinberger who is a practising lawyer.

== Written works ==
- Report of the Osgoode Hall Study on Compensation for Victims of Automobile Accidents, (1965)
- The Canadian Judiciary, (1976)
- La responsabilité civile délictuelle, (1988)
- Canadian Tort Law, 6th ed., (1997).
- Canadian Tort Law: Cases. Notes and Materials, 11th ed., (1999), co-author.
