= Ipperwash Inquiry =

Inquiry regarding the Ipperwash Crisis

The Ipperwash Inquiry was a two-year public judicial inquiry funded by the Government of Ontario, led by Sidney B. Linden, and established under the Ontario Public Inquiries Act (1990), which culminated in a four volume 1,533-page Ipperwash Inquiry Report released on May 30, 2007.

The inquiry was established by then-Premier Dalton McGuinty shortly after he took office after winning the Ontario general election on October 23, 2003. On November 12, 2003 the Liberal government launched the inquiry with a twofold purpose, to investigate events surrounding the death of 38-year-old Dudley George, who was shot and killed by an OPP officer at Ipperwash Provincial Park in September 1995, and to make recommendations to prevent the escalation of violence like that which took place during the Ipperwash Crisis. According to the report, George was the "first aboriginal person to be killed in a land-rights dispute in Canada since the 19th century." The report found that "the appropriation of the Stony Point reserve by the Government of Canada in 1942 was unprecedented in Canadian history."

== Background ==
For ten years Dudley George's brother Sam George fought "for justice" calling for an inquiry into Dudley's death. In 2008, a year after the report was released, Sam George was inducted into the Order of Ontario. The man who nominated George, Wayne Samuelson, said that, "Sam George did not seek revenge – he sought justice. Sam is a man of peace, a shining example for us all. Debewin is the Ojibway word for truth. It means the truth is supposed to heal us all. That's what Sam set out to do."

In 2003 Amnesty International renewed its call for an inquiry. Alex Neve, secretary-general of Amnesty International Canada said that "[e}Eight years is simply too long to wait for answer" and that governments at the federal and provincial level had "ignored their responsibilities" and defied a 1999 request from the United Nations. He added that this was "hurting Canada's efforts to pressure other countries on human rights and cited this country's dispute with Iran over the death of Iranian-Canadian photojournalist Zahra Kazemi as an example."

According to a 2015 history of the Ontario Court of Justice, for many years the family of Dudley George, especially his brother Sam George had called for an investigation, questions had continued to be raised in the Ontario Legislature, and journalists had continued their investigations. On November 12, 2003, the Liberal government that had just won the Ontario general election on October 23, 2003, under Premier McGuinty, called for an inquiry. (Note: The Ipperwash crisis and the tainted water crisis in Walkerton improved McGuinty's chances of replacing the Conservative government that had been in power under Mike Harris from 1995 through 2002 and under Ernie Eves from 2002 through 2003.)

== Date and location of the hearings ==
The hearings for the inquiry were conducted between July 2004 and August 2006 at Kimball Hall Forest Memorial Arena and Community Centre in Forest, Ontario. This location was chosen as it is less than 20 km from where the events leading to the inquiry occurred and because this location made it more convenient for the many local witnesses who testified to attend.

== Public judicial inquiry ==
The public judicial inquiry was funded by the Government of Ontario under the Ontario Public Inquiries Act (1990). In the introduction of Volume 3 of his final report, Linden explained how public inquiries are "established by government, and their objective is to fulfill the mandate set out in an order-in-council, yet they are independent of government." He wrote that a "public inquiry can be called to uncover the truth about a specific matter... and to propose policy reform" as was the case with the Ipperwash inquiry.

It was led by a neutral third party, Sidney B. Linden, "pursuant to his powers as commissioner established under the Ontario Public Inquiries Act." The inquiry culminated in a four volume 1,533-page Ipperwash Inquiry Report released on May 30, 2007. The public inquiry was funded by the Government of Ontario but conducted by a neutral third party, Linden, was a neutral third party "pursuant to his powers as commissioner established under the Ontario Public Inquiries Act".

The inquiry had a twofold mandate, set out by the order in council, "to look into and report on events surrounding the death of Dudley George and to make recommendations focused on the avoidance of violence in similar circumstances."

== Ipperwash Inquiry Report ==
The inquiry culminated in the four volume 1,533-page Ipperwash Inquiry Report released on May 30, 2007. According to the report, George was the "first aboriginal person to be killed in a land-rights dispute in Canada since the 19th century."

The full report consisted of 4 volumes. Volume 1 covered "Investigation and Findings", Volume 2 was on Policy Analysis, Volume 3 was on Inquiry Process, and Volume 4 included the Executive Summary.

According to the section "OPP Prepare for Park Occupation" in Volume 2, on August 29, 1995, OPP Incident Commander John Carson contacted RCMP Inspector Dave Guy in British Columbia about possible similarities with the Gustafsen Lake standoff where the RCMP had been "subject to gunfire".

=== Original land claim ===
In Volume 1, in the section "History of Stoney Point and Kettle Point", Joan Holmes reported that in 1937 the Chief and Council of the Kettle and Stony Point Band had requested that the provincial government preserve an old Indian burial ground at Ipperwash Beach by fencing it to protect it. This section of the report described in detail the discovery and authentication of burial sites, the appropriation of land containing the burial sites, and the unrelenting efforts on the part of the Kettle and Stony Point Band to have this site protected. It also described the establishment of Ipperwash Provincial Park in 1936 and the ongoing efforts of the First Nations to protect the burial sites. Stony Point of According to a September 20, 2015 CBC News report twenty years after the Ipperwash Crisis, the land dispute dated back to 1942, when the federal government appropriated Chippewas of Kettle and Stony Point First Nation's land to build Camp Ipperwash, a military base, under the War Measures Act and relocated 16 First Nation families and their homes. The land was supposed to be used as a base only during the war and with a promise of compensation. After World War II, the land was not returned to the First Nation, Camp Ipperwash was used for training cadets until 1995. The First Nations claimed that Sandy Point was a sacred burial site. By 1993, members of the First Nation began to occupy Camp Ipperwash while the military was using the land for training army cadets. In 1995 the military withdrew. A group of 30 First Nations protesters marched into Ipperwash Provincial Park and took up occupation on September 4, 1995.

=== Conclusions ===
The report found that "the appropriation of the Stony Point reserve by the Government of Canada in 1942 was unprecedented in Canadian history."

The inquiry "found that the OPP, the provincial government led by Premier Mike Harris, and the federal government all bore responsibility for the events that led to George's death. Linden also called on the federal government to issue a public apology and return Camp Ipperwash – along with compensation – to the Kettle and Stoney Point First Nation." In Volume 1 of the report it was noted that, Premier Harris's "comments" and "generally the speed at which he wished to end the occupation of Ipperwash Park, created an atmosphere that unduly narrowed the scope of the government's response to the Aboriginal occupation."

The report made 100 recommendations.

== Responses and aftermath ==
The Ipperwash inquiry has been called a landmark inquiry by Amnesty International Canada. According to a June 1, 2007 article in The Toronto Star, the Law Society of Upper Canada described it as "a landmark report on Aboriginal, police and government relations."

=== Aboriginal occupation of land in Caledonia ===
The Ipperwash inquiry proceedings were taking place at the same time as the Caledonia land dispute also known as the Grand River land dispute. In 2006, members of the Six Nations of the Grand River took control of a disputed parcel of land in Caledonia, Ontario, in Haldimand County known as the Haldimand Tract. The Caledonia occupation resulted in a successful $20 million lawsuit by Caledonia residents against the Crown. The University of Western Ontario's political science professor, Andrew Sancton wrote in his 2012 article, that the case for Caledonia residents would have been weaker if the Crown had implemented Linden's "democratic policing" model. In her 2010 book entitled Helpless: Caledonia's Nightmare of Fear and Anarchy, and How the Law Failed All of Us, reporter Christie Blatchford said that Linden's democratic policing model received "virtually no public attention". She decried the vacuum of policy accountability. Blatchford said that a "more intelligent and sympathetic view of aboriginal and Canadian history [than the Ipperwash Inquiry report] would be hard to find"

=== Five year anniversary of the Inquiry (2012) ===
By 2012, Ontario Regional Chief Angus Toulouse said that, "the most meaningful recommendations remain[ed] unaddressed and combined with the fact that the province ha[d] cut funding to support joint implementation work by half compared to 2007 levels" First Nations questioned whether the Ontario government was "committed to making the changes necessary to achieve reconciliation with First Nations in Ontario."

=== Twenty years after Dudley's death (2015) ===
By January 2015, the disputed land still had not been returned to the Kettle and Stoney Point First Nation. In 2010 the Ontario government had confirmed that the land had been transferred to the "federal government, which alone has the power to designate reserve territory." On September 18, 2015 members of the Chippewas of Kettle and Stony Point First Nation voted to approve a deal with the federal government which included a "$90-million dollar financial settlement", the "return of land appropriated by the federal government in 1942 and the cleanup of Stoney Point lands."
