= Chippewas of Kettle and Stony Point First Nation =

Kettle Point 44 Wiiwkwedong Anishinaabek
- Ingidenous Reserve
- Kettle Point Indigenous Reserve No. 44
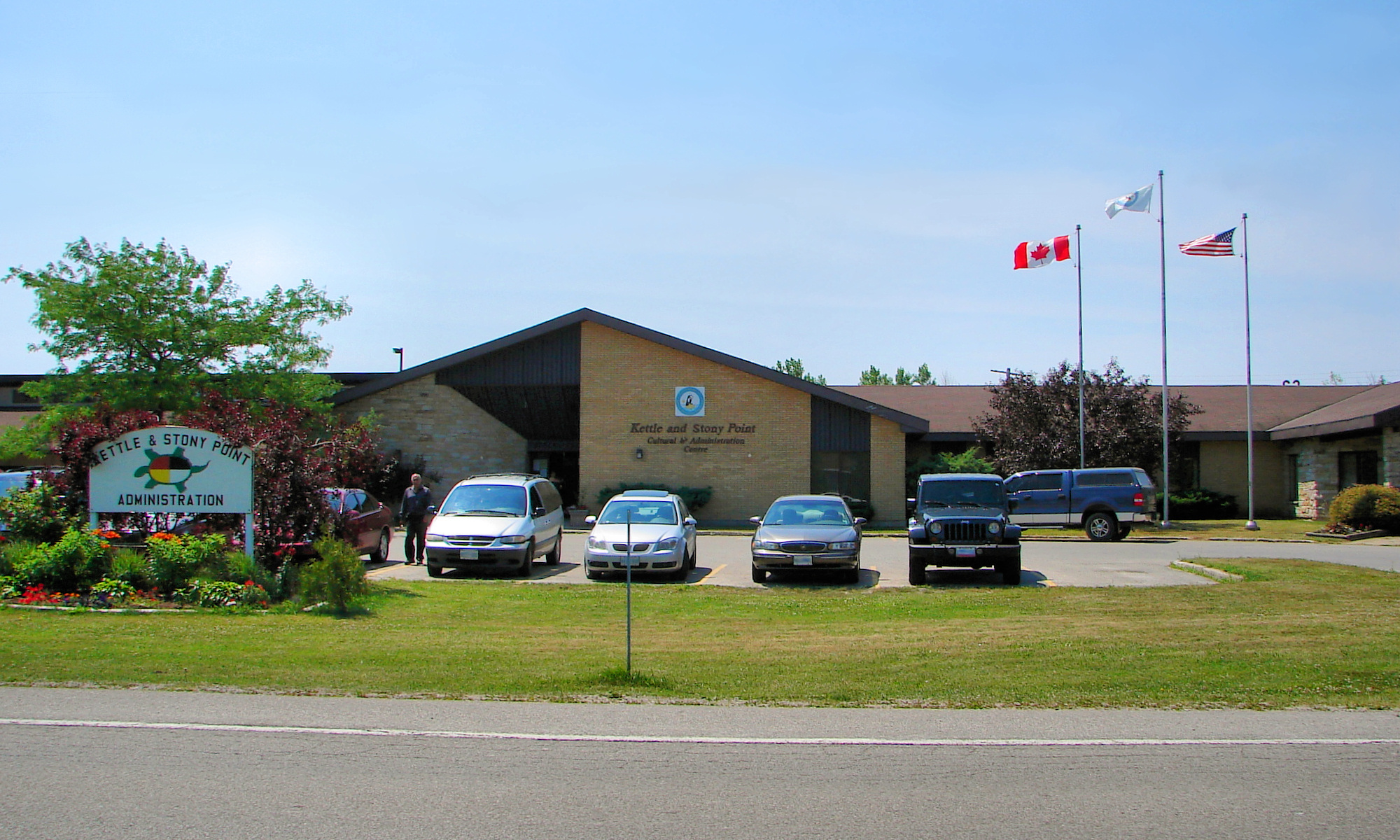
- Administration building

- Location within Southern Ontario
- Coordinates: 43°12′N 82°00′W
- Country: Canada
- Province: Ontario
- County: Lambton
- First Nation: Chippewas of Kettle and Stony Point
- Settled: 1827

Government
  - Type: First Nation Council Government
  - Chief: Kim Bressette
  - Federal riding: Sarnia—Lambton—Bkejwanong
  - Prov. riding: Lambton—Kent—Middlesex

Area
  - Land: 9.20 km^{2} (3.55 sq mi)

Population (2021)
  - Total: 1,233
  - Density: 132.3/km^{2} (343/sq mi)
- Time zone: UTC-5 (EST)
  - Summer (DST): UTC-4 (EDT)
- Postal Code: N0N 1J1
- Area codes: 519 and 226
- Website: www.kettlepoint.org

Kettle & Stony Point First Nation (Ojibwe: Wiiwkwedong Anishinaabek, meaning: "in/at the bay") comprises the Kettle Point reserve and Stony Point Reserve (which is under remedial cleanup after over 50 years of occupation by the Canadian Armed Forces), both located approximately 35 kilometres (22 mi) northeast of Sarnia, Ontario, Canada, on the southern shore of Lake Huron. The reserves serve as the land base for the Chippewas (Anishnaabeg) of Kettle and Stony Point First Nation.

They are one of 42 Anishinaabeg First Nations in Ontario that belong to the Anishinabek Nation Grand Council.

== History ==
The Chippewa (also generally called Ojibwe in Canada) are an Anishinaabemowin-speaking indigenous nation with people within the borders of present-day Canada and the United States. The historical local dialect is known as the Anishinaabemowin Language of Kettle and Stony Point.

=== Governance ===
Leaders Chiefs of the First Nation

Pre-Indian Act Chiefs: Oshawnoo at Kettle Point (1826), Whapagas at Stony Point (1826), John Johnston (1860), Isaac Shawnoo (1860).

Chief Councilors representing Kettle & Stony Point at the "Sarnia Band Council,": John Johnston (1872), Isaac Shawnoo (1872), Lewis Cloud (1892), Adam Sapah (1895), Jeffrey Bressette (1899), James Johnston (1899), John Elijah (1907), John Milliken (1907), Caleb Shawkence (1913)

Elected Chiefs since secession from Sarnia Band: Cornelius Shawnoo (1919), John Milliken (1927), Sam Bressette (1928–34), Caleb Shawkence (1934-40), Frank Bressette (1940), Bruce Milliken (1943), Frank Bressette (1946), Wilfred Shawkence (1949), Frank Bressette (1952), Earl Bressette (1954), David Bressette (1956), Thomas Bressette (1958-1970), Charles Shawkence (1970-1976), Frederick F. Bressette (1976), Charles Shawkence (1978-1981), Victor H. George (1981), Milton L. George (1982), Charles Shawkence (1984-1988), Yvonne Bressette (1988), Thomas M. Bressette (1990–97), Irving George (1997–98), Norman Shawnoo (1998-2000), Thomas M. Bressette (2000-2008), Elizabeth Cloud (2008-2012), Thomas M. Bressette (2012-2018), Jason Henry (2018-2022), Kim Bressette (2022-)

Present Elected Council Members: 2022-24 term

1) Elizabeth Cloud

2) Carmen Rogers Jr.

3) Al Wolfe

4) Ronald C. George

5) Jack Brown

6) Marshall George

7) Larry Vincent George

8) Stan Cloud

9) Melissa Monague

=== Land dispute ===
In 1942 during World War II, the federal government appropriated land at Stony Point under the War Measures Act to build a military camp, Camp Ipperwash, after offering payment to the Chippewa of Kettle and Stony Point First Nations. Their offer was rejected. The government had originally made as part of the offer a promise to return the land but continued to use it after the war. By the 1990s, it was primarily a summer training camp for cadets. Residents were evicted, and moved into the Kettle Point First Nation, with unhappy consequences and social tension.

In the 1990s, during rising political activism, band members who had ties to the Stony Point reserve began occupying parts of the base in 1993. The military withdrew entirely in 1995. On Labour Day 1995, band members barricaded part of neighbouring Ipperwash Provincial Park to promote their land claim. They said they were protecting a native burial ground and water purification plant. During a confrontation with Ontario Provincial Police at the protest, an Ojibwe (Anishinaabe) man, KSPFN band member, Dudley George, was shot and killed.

In 1997, acting Sgt. Kenneth Deane was convicted of criminal negligence causing George's death. Native groups called for an official inquiry into George's death, but none was launched until the provincial government changed in 2003. The Ipperwash Inquiry began in 2004 and concluded in 2006. Commissioner Sidney B. Linden delivered his report in 2007.

An Agreement in Principle, dated 1998, was never officially accepted by the First Nation, and the claim was still outstanding as of 2007. Ontario officially returned the land to the First Nation in 2009, but they will govern it together for some time, in order to manage environmental and other issues. In 2015 a $90 million land claim was settled and paid to the First Nation with respect to the Camp Ipperwash-Stony Point claim, a separate but related claim to the Ipperwash Provincial Park claim. Distributions took three forms: 1) Location ticket heirs received $150,000 for each "location ticket" that was extinguished in 1942, 2) $10,000 for seniors 55+ years old, and 3) $5000 for members 18–54 years old. The members under 18 years old at time of settlement had their $5000 distribution put into a collective trust account to be released upon turning 18 years of age.

The Investigation Agreement to determine the environmental impacts of the military base on the land began in 2006. The investigation will provide the basis for environmental amelioration, if necessary. In addition, Cultural, Environmental and UXO investigations are underway. The Government of Canada, along with the First Nation, is working closely with an independent contractor selected through the Public Works Canada-tendering process, as well as with special advisors with the necessary expertise to oversee the project. The cleanup may prove difficult since the base was used as a firing range for tanks. Unexploded ordnance has been found.

== Demographics ==
In May 2008, the resident population was 1260, of whom about 900 members lived off the reserve. As of January 2011, the band had a total of 2219 registered members, of whom 1300 live on their own reserve, 20 live on another reserve, and 899 don't live on a reserve. By July 2012, the number of registered members had increased to 2337, of whom 1316 live on the reserve.

Canada census – Chippewas of Kettle and Stony Point First Nation community profile

	2011
Population	936 (-8.2% from 2006)
Land area	9.20 km^{2} (3.55 sq mi)
Population density	101.7/km^{2} (263/sq mi)
Median age	32.1 (M: 29.1, F: 35.6)
Private dwellings	775 (total)
Median household income

References: 2011

== Geology ==
Kettle Point is the site of a rare outcrop of an Upper Devonian shale called the Kettle Point Formation. This rock layer is exposed at the tip of the point near the shore of Lake Huron. A fragmentary fossil Dunkleosteus, named D. amblyodoratus or 'blunt spear', was found there. Spherical or ovoid concretions of rock, locally called "kettles", weather out of the shale along the shoreline. To the local Anishinabek, the rare stones were thunderbird eggs. The concretions are now protected but are often found on nearby properties.

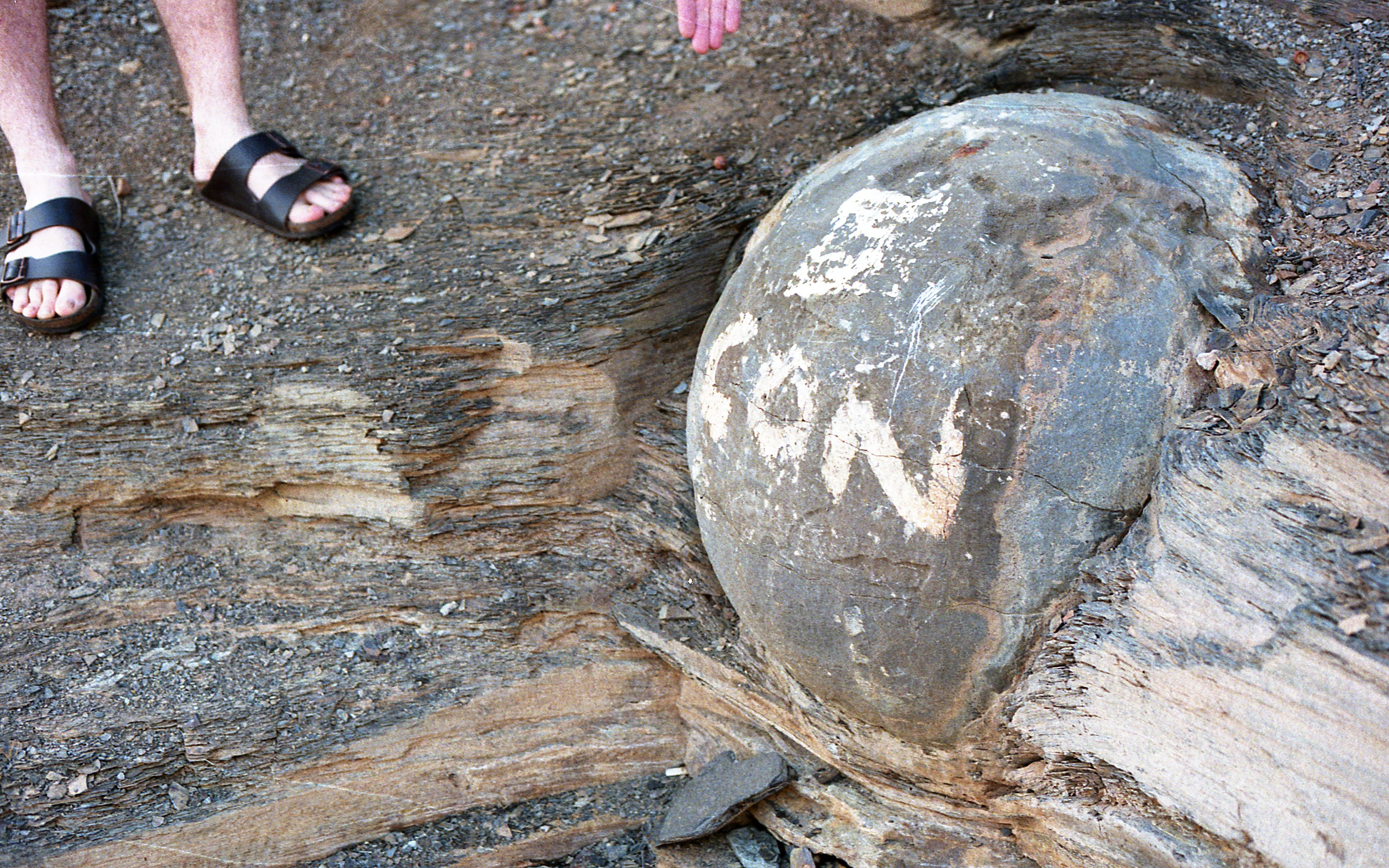
"Kettle" concretion at Kettle Point, Ontario, defaced by graffiti.

Just offshore, below the Kettle Point formation, is a layer of the Hamilton Group of shales and limestones which contains a large amount of light-coloured, high-quality chert. In stone tool technology, it is a highly prized resource. Approximately ten thousand years ago during the Lake Stanley unconformity, when lake levels were lower during the retreat of the Wisconsinian ice sheets, the chert was exposed and could be mined. Evidence of this has been found at the nearby Parkhill site dating from 7800 to 8800 BC. Kettle Point chert was dispersed to the far reaches of the region as projectile points, scrapers, and other tools.

== See also ==
- CKTI-FM
