= Ipperwash Crisis =

First Nations land dispute in Ontario

The Ipperwash Crisis was a dispute over Indigenous land that took place in Ipperwash Provincial Park, Ontario, on September 4, 1995. Several members of the Stoney Point Ojibwe band occupied the park to assert claim to nearby land which had been expropriated from them during the Second World War. During a violent confrontation, the Ontario Provincial Police (OPP) killed protester Dudley George. George was holding a stick when OPP officer Ken Deane discharged his firearm. George subsequently died from his injuries. Deane later claimed that George was himself armed but was found guilty of criminal negligence.

Later allegations emerged that newly-elected Ontario Premier Mike Harris said to the attending OPP: "I want the fucking Indians out of the park." The claim came from a former attorney general although eight other present witnesses denied this allegation. However, the Ipperwash Inquiry concluded that Premier Harris did in fact make the remarks.

The events stirred major political controversy in Ontario and Canada, casting a pall over government relations with Indigenous bands. In 2003 a provincial inquiry, the Ipperwash Inquiry, was started after a change in government. Former Ontario Chief Justice Sidney B. Linden led the investigation of events, which was completed in the fall of 2006. George's killing has been the subject of a non-fiction book One Dead Indian.

== Background ==
In 1936, the province of Ontario created Ipperwash Provincial Park. In 1942 during the Second World War, the Government of Canada wanted reserve land from the Stoney Point Band to use as a base for military training and offered to buy it for $15 per acre. They also promised to return the land after the war ended but the band rejected the offer.

Under the War Measures Act, the federal government expropriated the lands from the Stoney Point Reserve and established Military Camp Ipperwash, an infantry training facility. The Stoney Point First Nation claim that the grounds contain a burial site. In 2010, archaeological surveys confirmed the burial site. As early as 1993, while Camp Ipperwash was still being used as a summer training centre for the Royal Canadian Army Cadets, band members had occupied portions of the camp and the adjacent piece of land. After the summer of 1993, the government moved the cadet camp to CFB Borden. There was growing tension about the base at Camp Ipperwash.

== Occupation of the park ==
On Labour Day Monday, September 4, 1995, a group of people started a protest in Ipperwash Provincial Park to draw attention to the decades-old land claims. After the park closed at 6:00 p.m., protestors cut back a fence and by 7:30 had moved vehicles into the park. About thirty-five protestors occupied the park. The protestors had been threatening occupation since the spring. The original police strategy was to co-occupy the park peacefully with the Indigenous people. But when a protester smashed the window of a police cruiser, the OPP pulled back from the park. In anticipation of the move on the park by more protesters, the OPP had prepared a contingency plan named Project Maple. The plan stressed "a peaceful resolution" and called for a team of two negotiators to be on call around the clock.

Progressive Conservative member of Provincial Parliament (MPP) Marcel Beaubien was in contact with the police the following day, and Beaubien also contacted the office of Premier Harris, in an attempt to put pressure on the government to intervene.

On September 5, 1995, the premier and several government officials met to discuss the Ipperwash protest. The meeting notes concluded that "the province will take steps to remove the occupiers as soon as possible."

== Killing of Dudley George ==
On Wednesday, the OPP became concerned about a group of protesters who had wandered outside the park and into the Sandy Park lot area adjacent to the cottages. The group were allegedly carrying bats and sticks in their hands. The number of protesters has been debated, although police reports indicate a group of up to eight.

There was also misinformation about damage that had been done to a band councillor's car by this group of protesters. The damage to the councillor's car was from a rock thrown by one of the protesters who took exception to an article the councillor had written disapproving of the occupation. A rumour started that the protesters smashed up the vehicle of a female driver with baseball bats, a report that was later found by Justice Sidney Linden to be false and misleading.

Out of public safety concerns, the OPP decided to deploy the crowd management unit (CMU) to force the protesters back into the park. The CMU was a riot squad armed with steel batons, shields and helmets. The CMU was backed up by a tactical response unit (TRU). The OPP intended a show of force to move the protesters back inside the park.

On Wednesday evening, police riot squads marched down to the Sandy Parking Lot to confront the protesters. As the CMU advanced, the protesters initially retreated and the CMU responded by also retreating. One protester, Cecil Bernard George, approached the police (peacefully according to the protesters, violently according to police reports). George was taken down and surrounded by police and arrested. Protesters attempted to rescue George from the arrest by the police units. This resulted in a riot.

A car and a school bus driven by protesters started out of the park to assist the protesters in their fight against police. According to police officers, there was gunfire from these vehicles, but First Nations protesters have insisted they had no weapons in the park that night. The OPP TRU teams opened fire on the vehicles, resulting in the wounding of two Native protesters and the death of Dudley George, an Ojibwa protestor. Among the TRU members was Acting Sergeant Ken "Tex" Deane, a senior officer in charge of a four-man sharpshooter team with the job of escorting the force's crowd management unit. Deane was near the park entrance and fired three shots at Dudley George, who was about fifteen feet from the park entrance, and was hit and badly injured.

George's sister Carolyn and brother Pierre attempted to take him to the local hospital for treatment but were arrested and delayed by the OPP for over an hour. George was declared dead at 12:20 a.m. on September 7 at nearby Strathroy Middlesex General Hospital, in Strathroy, Ontario.

== Consequences ==
=== Criminal investigation ===
Acting Sergeant Ken Deane (October 1961 – February 25, 2006) was convicted of criminal negligence causing death. Deane's defence was that he had believed that Dudley George was carrying a rifle. The judge rejected Deane's claim, stating that he had invented it "in an ill-fated attempt to disguise the fact that an unarmed man had been shot". He sentenced Deane to a conditional sentence of two years less a day to be served in the community, and 180 hours of community service.

Deane unsuccessfully appealed the verdict to the Ontario Court of Appeal and the Supreme Court of Canada. In September 2001, he pled guilty to discreditable conduct under the Police Services Act and in January 2002 was ordered to resign. He later worked in security at an Ontario Hydro nuclear station. On February 25, 2006, he died in a car accident when his vehicle collided with a semi-truck near Prescott. He died at the scene. He was to testify at the Ipperwash inquiry in a few weeks.

=== Inquiry ===
The George family repeatedly called on the Ontario and federal governments to launch an inquiry into the events at Ipperwash. A public inquiry was launched on November 12, 2003, after the Ontario Conservatives lost power to Dalton McGuinty's Ontario Liberal Party in the 2003 election.

The Ipperwash Inquiry was established on April 20, 2004, by the Government of Ontario to report on events surrounding the death of George. It was funded by the provincial government and conducted by Sidney B. Linden, pursuant to his powers as commissioner established under the Public Inquiries Act. The act was passed in 1990 and has since been updated (2009). The inquiry's mandate was to report on events surrounding the death and make recommendations that would avoid violence in similar circumstances in the future. The inquiry was neither a civil nor criminal trial.

During the inquiry, a 17-minute tape recording surfaced that cast new light on the events at Ipperwash. The tape records a conversation between OPP Inspector Ron Fox and Inspector John Carson, the OPP commander overseeing the standoff at Ipperwash, prior to George's death. They discussed Premier Mike Harris's view that the government has "tried to pacify and pander to these people far too long" and to use "swift affirmative action" to remove them from the park.

Other testimony has further put the Harris government in a bad light. In particular, former Harris aide Deb Hutton repeatedly testified in November, 2005 that she couldn't remember any specific conversations. This led Julian Falconer, acting as counsel for Aboriginal Legal Services of Toronto, to pointedly remark on cross-examination that Hutton had used phrases to the effect of "I don't recall" on 134 separate occasions in her in-chief testimony.

Former Ontario Attorney General Charles Harnick also testified that Harris shouted, "I want the fucking Indians out of the park." Later witnesses denied Harnick's evidence, but the Ipperwash Inquiry concluded that Harnick's testimony was credible and that Premier Harris did in fact make the remarks (Report of the Ipperwash Inquiry, Vol.1, p. 363). Harris appeared before the inquiry on February 14, 2006. He testified that he had never said the statement attributed to him by Harnick. Justice Linden "found the statements were made and they were racist, whether intended or not".

The evidentiary hearings of the inquiry ended on June 28, 2006. Justice Linden's final report and findings of the inquiry were released on May 31, 2007. Along with 100 recommendations meant to enhance government relations with First Nations and to prevent similar escalation of violence in future situations, the report found that "the appropriation of the Stony Point reserve by the Government of Canada in 1942 was unprecedented in Canadian history."

=== Return of land ===
On December 20, 2007, the Ontario government announced its intention to return the 56-hectare Ipperwash Provincial Park to its original owners, the Chippewas of Kettle and Stony Point First Nation. There was hope amongst the local Anishanbek First Nation that Linden's report would constitute a new beginning.

The decision did not take immediate effect, as the land will be "co-managed" by the province and the Chippewas, with consultation from the surrounding community, for the time being. According to Aboriginal Affairs Minister Michael Bryant, the land will be fully returned over an unspecified period of time, until the Chippewas have full control. On Thursday May 28, 2009, Ontario Aboriginal Affairs Minister Brad Duguid formally signed over control of Ipperwash Park to the Chippewas of Kettle and Stony Point First Nation.

The settlement was finalized on April 14, 2016. Along with CA$95 million (equivalent to $121.5 million in 2025), the land was signed over to the Kettle and Stony Point First Nation by Minister of National Defence Harjit Sajjan and Minister of Indigenous and Northern Affairs Carolyn Bennett. Chief Thomas Bressette signed the agreement on behalf of the band.

== See also ==
- One Dead Indian
- Oka Crisis
- Burnt Church Crisis
- Gustafsen Lake Standoff
- Caledonia Land Dispute
