= Camp Ipperwash =

Former Canadian Forces training facility in Ontario

Coordinates: 43°11′30″N 81°56′15″W

Military Camp Ipperwash (also Camp Ipperwash) is a former Canadian Forces training facility located in Lambton County, Ontario, near Kettle Point. On April 14, 2016, it was returned to the Chippewas of Kettle and Stony Point First Nation.

== History ==
=== Geography ===
The shore frontage of this parcel, including the park immediately to the west, had been sold to non-aboriginal interests in 1927–1928 (the Crawford/White and the Scott purchases). The property for the park was purchased in 1932 and established in 1936. In April 1942, the Department of National Defence (DND) sought a voluntary surrender of the remaining property of the reserve behind these parcels to the east of the provincial park, however they were refused. DND then used the War Measures Act and expropriated the property, with the expropriation agreement indicating that the property would be returned to the First Nation when it was no longer needed for a military purpose.

=== Military Camp Formation ===
In 1941 the Department of National Defence (DND) identified a requirement for an army training facility in southwestern Ontario. In February 1942, DND began investigating land on the shore of Lake Huron northeast of Sarnia adjacent to Ipperwash Provincial Park (est. in 1936). This property was a large parcel comprising the eastern third of the Stoney Point Reserve, controlled by the Chippewas Stoney Point First Nation.

Camp Ipperwash was formed on January 28, 1942, with the A29 Canadian Infantry Training Centre (A29 CITC) being the lodger unit. Following the land expropriation, buildings and a firing range were constructed on the property that spring and summer. By July 1942, sixteen Stony Point families had been moved further west to Kettle Point, giving DND full access to the new military training area. A29 CITC served as a "boot camp" or basic training centre for army recruits from southwestern Ontario (Military District #1) and ceased operations in 1945.

Following the end of the Second World War, DND indicated it was willing to return the majority of the expropriated land and would lease back any areas that were still required for training, however this offer was refused. It was generally thought that Camp Ipperwash would be identified as surplus to DND's requirements, which would enable the expropriated property to be returned to the Chippewas of Kettle and Stony Point. However, this was not the case and Camp Ipperwash remained in use as a training facility by the regular and reserve forces of the Canadian Army, as well as serving as a cadet summer training centre (CSTC) for the Royal Canadian Army Cadets beginning in 1948.

=== Korean War ===
During the Korean War, Camp Ipperwash saw use as the "Home Depot" of the 2nd Canadian Rifle Battalion, which unit later adopted the name of The Queen's Own Rifles of Canada. Following the Korean War, Camp Ipperwash saw continued use as a training facility by regular and reserve army personnel as well as army cadets.

=== Use after Unification ===
The unification of the Canadian Forces on February 1, 1968, saw Camp Ipperwash remain with its current name, unlike many other CF facilities which were renamed Canadian Forces Base (CFB) or Canadian Forces Station (CFS). In 1972, Jean Chrétien, the then Minister of Indian Affairs, stated the land claim for the expropriation was valid, however DND still did not relinquish control.

Through the 1970s to 1993, Ipperwash saw use as a firing range training facility for the CFB London-based 1st Battalion, The Royal Canadian Regiment (1 RCR), Primary Reserve units, local and provincial police and the Canadian Cadet Movement. Because of the occupation of portions of the camp during the summer of 1993, the cadet summer training centre eventually moved from Camp Ipperwash to CFB Borden in 1994 renamed Blackdown Cadet Summer Training Centre.

== Ipperwash Crisis ==
During the late 1980s, the Stoney Point First Nation began to pressure the federal and provincial governments to revert ownership of the entire property as per the 1941 expropriation agreement. The adjacent land at Ipperwash Provincial Park was claimed by the Stoney Point First Nation and was reputed to contain a burial ground.

Several protests occurred over the land issue during the late 1980s and early 1990s as the Canadian Forces began to examine and identify surplus property following the end of the Cold War. During the early 1990s, rumours began circulating about the impending move of the 1 RCR based in London to CFB Petawawa, thereby drastically reducing usage of the camp now called the Ipperwash Range Training Areas (IRTA).

In May 1993, members of the Stoney Point First Nation began an occupation of the property, setting up tents on the firing ranges in a bid to pressure the federal government to revert ownership.

All military training at IRTA (by then reduced to local reserve and cadet units) ceased at that time. The military identified IRTA as surplus and agreed to transfer the facility to the Stoney Point First Nation by 1995.

The caretaker staff departed on July 29, 1995, when the Canadian Forces decommissioned the facility. Following the military's departure, native protesters occupying the property became more vocal over the following days and weeks in demanding the ownership revert.

The week following Labour Day saw the occupation on IRTA and the adjacent Ipperwash Provincial Park become a flashpoint in First Nation relations with the federal government and the government of Ontario.

The shooting death of Stoney Point First Nation protester Dudley George by the Ontario Provincial Police has come to be known as the Ipperwash Crisis.

The federal government and Stoney Point First Nation reached an agreement on the transfer of the IRTA on June 18, 1998. The Stoney Point First Nation has yet to reach an agreement with the provincial government on the transfer of Ipperwash Provincial Park.

Most of the Second World War-era "temporary" buildings on IRTA remain; however only some are in use by the Stoney Point First Nation.

== Return to Kettle and Stoney Point First Nation ==
In 2007, partial control of Ipperwash Provincial Park was returned to the Chippewas of Kettle and Stoney Point First Nation through an agreement that the band would co-manage the land with the provincial government. At the time, the province planned to return ownership of the land, but no specific timeline was set.

An agreement to return the Camp Ipperwash land was signed on April 14, 2016. Along with a $95 million payment, the land was signed over to the Kettle and Stoney Point First Nation by Minister of National Defense Harjit Sajjan and Minister of Indigenous and Northern Affairs Dr. Carolyn Bennett. Chief Thomas Bresette signed on behalf of the band.
