= Ipperwash Provincial Park =

Provincial park in Ontario, Canada

- IUCN category II (national park)
- Location within Southern Ontario
- Nearest city: Grand Bend, Ontario
- Coordinates: 43°12′54″N 81°57′14″W
- Area: 56 ha (140 acres)
- Established: 1936
- Governing body: Ontario Parks 1936-2007

Ipperwash Provincial Park is a former provincial park on the shores of southern Lake Huron in Lambton County, Ontario, Canada.

Located near Grand Bend, the 56-hectare (140-acre) park was established in 1936. It contains a long sandy beach on the lakeshore, as well as rare flowers and sand dunes. Wildlife include migrating jaegers, scoter, grebe, and brant goose.

== Ipperwash Crisis ==
In 1942, during World War II, the Government of Canada appropriated land for a military base from the Chippewa of Kettle and Stoney Point First Nation, purportedly only for the duration, and initially with a promise of compensation. The military continued to use Camp Ipperwash for summer training of cadets into the 1990s. During the late 1980s, the Stoney Point First Nation began to pressure the Canada and Ontario governments to revert ownership of the entire property as per the 1941 expropriation agreement. The adjacent land at Ipperwash Provincial Park was claimed by the Stoney Point First Nation and was reputed to contain a burial ground. First Nations activism led protesters to occupy the base and the park in September 1995. A confrontation between the Ontario Provincial Police and the protesters resulted in the death of Dudley George.

In 2003, the Government of Ontario commissioned an investigative inquiry, the Ipperwash Inquiry, into George's death and events of the protest. This led to changes in policing policy, and findings that some officials had made racist comments.

== Return to First Nation ==
On 20 December 2007, the Ontario government announced that it would return Ipperwash Provincial Park to the Chippewas of Kettle and Stony Point First Nation, and that the park would initially be administered jointly. On 4 February 2015, chief Tom Bressette informed Lambton County that a cultural centre would be built on site of the former park, with a hotel complex nearby. On April 14, 2016, the land was signed over to the Kettle and Stoney Point First Nation by Minister of National Defence Harjit Sajjan and Minister of Indigenous and Northern Affairs Carolyn Bennett with Chief Thomas Bressette signing the agreement on behalf of the band.
